= Kabuki brush =

Makeup brush

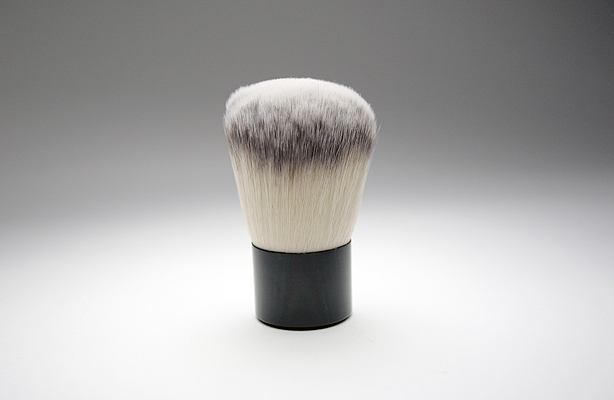
Kabuki brush

A kabuki brush, sometimes called mushroom brush, is a makeup brush with dense bristles and a short handle. The brush head is usually rounded, though it can also be flat. Traditionally, the bristles are made of natural materials like animal hair, such as from horses or goats, but most modern brushes have synthetic bristles.

== Origin ==
The brush is named after kabuki, a traditional type of Japanese drama theater, in which actors wear heavy makeup painted in dramatic styles (kumadori) to emphasize the nature of the characters. Actors use the kabuki brush to apply the white rice powder uniformly on their face.

== Modern usage ==
Usually, a kabuki brush is used to apply loose powdered make-up, such as foundation, face powder, or blush, on large surfaces of the face. Because of its design, the brush blends powdered makeup evenly on the skin and creates natural-looking coverage.
