= Makeup brush =

Brush used for applying makeup or face paint

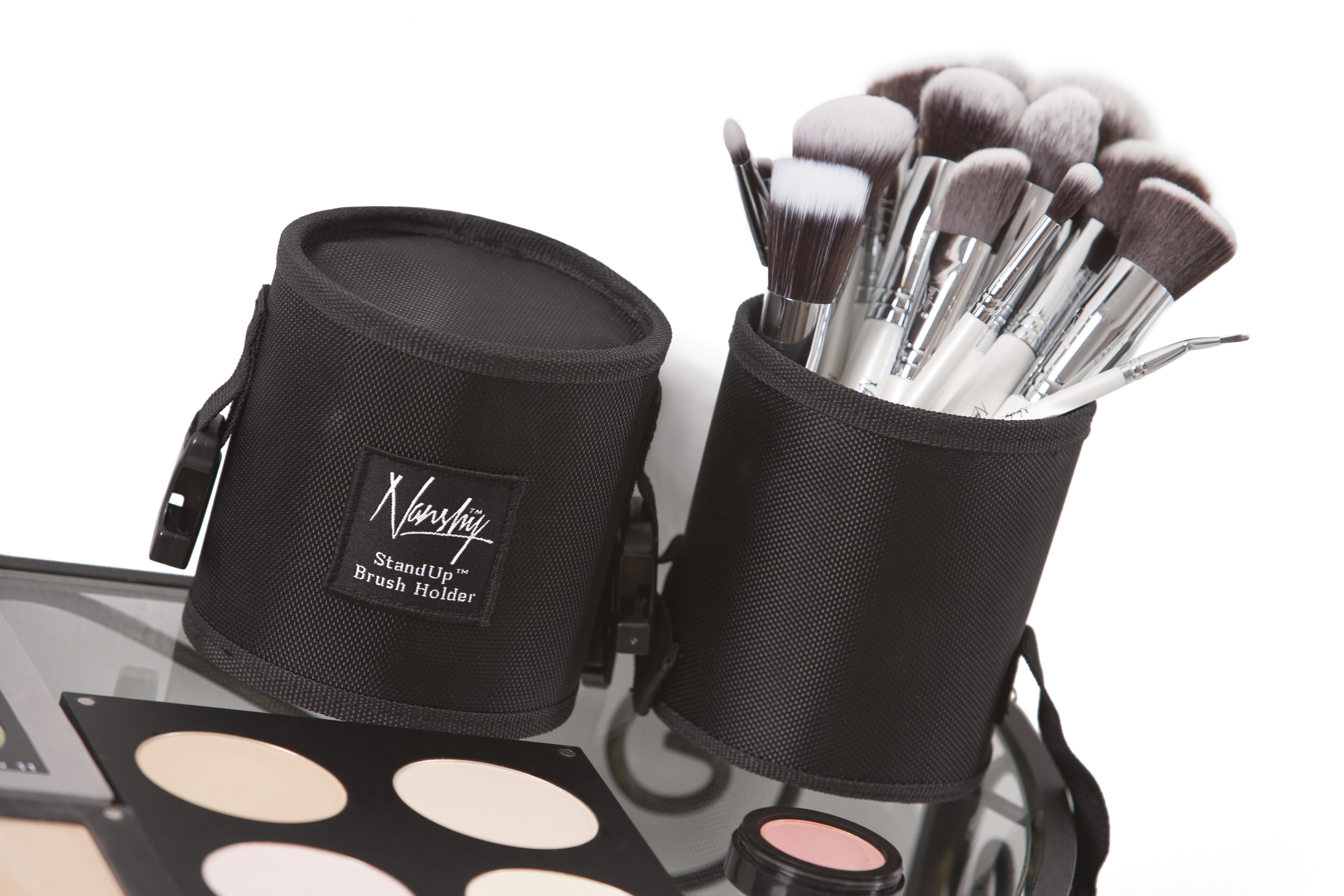
Makeup brushes

A makeup brush is a tool with bristles, used for the application of makeup or face painting. The bristles may be made out of natural or synthetic materials, while the handle is usually made out of plastic or wood. When cosmetics are applied using the appropriate brush, they blend better on the skin.

There is a large variety of shapes and sizes of makeup brushes, depending on the face area where makeup will be applied, the cosmetic product and the wanted result. For example, the shape of the brush tip can be chiseled, straight, angular, round, flat or tapered.

== Types of makeup brushes (by area of application) ==
=== Face ===
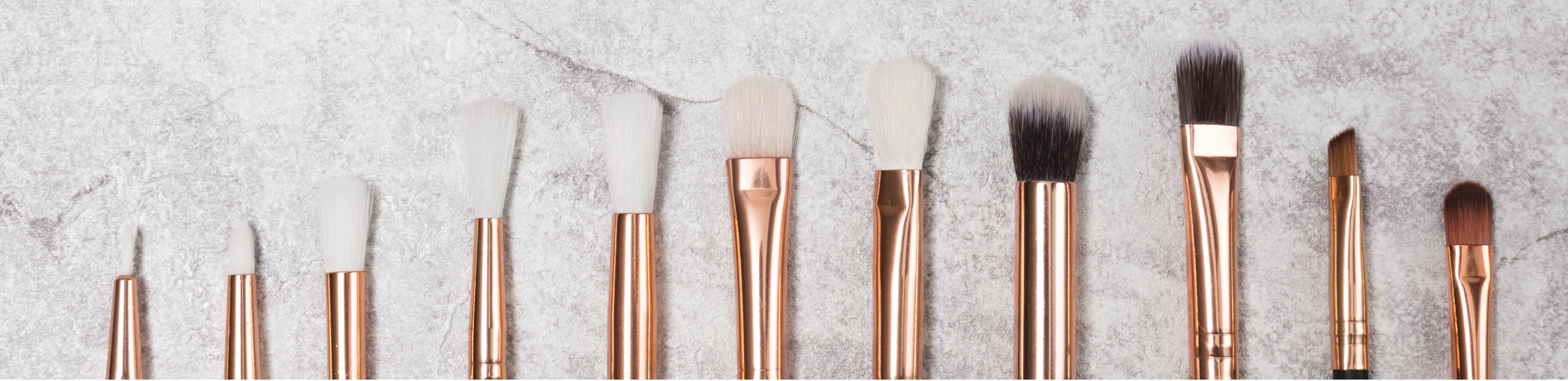
Makeup brush tips used for face makeup

- Foundation brush - long, flat bristles and tapered tip
- Powder brush - fluffy bristles; soft, full and rounded
- Fan brush - It is used to dust off any fallouts and also to apply highlighter on the highest points of the face. A large fan brush is usually made out of natural fibers and is fanned out 180 degrees that covers a large perimeter of the face.
- Blush brush - It has fine bristles and a rounded head. It is similar to a powder brush but smaller and can either be round or angled.
- Bronzer brush - It is made with natural bristles and is fluffy in shape. It applies powder bronzer beautifully and distributes the product evenly on the skin. One can also use this brush to apply face powders if one finds a normal powder brush too big to use.
- Concealer brush - soft and flat with a pointed tip and a wide base
- Kabuki brush - There are 2 types : Flat Top and Angled. Both types are densely packed. It best applies liquid foundations, and it provides full coverage.
- Duo-fiber multipurpose brush - flat, circular and feathery head
- Mineral powder brush - thick and rounded
- Face contour brush - slanted and rounded for cheekbones
- Face sponge - varied shape, sponge texture (use wet or dry)
- Highlighter brush - This brush is usually made out of natural bristles and is considerably small in size. The tapered but elongated bristles make it perfect for applying powder highlighter on the highest points of the face. The tapered bristles, while applying, make it evenly distributed on the skin.
- Blending brush - Blending brushes are made using natural bristles and are fluffy in appearance. It is used to blend out any harsh edges for a seamless effect. It works best with powder products because of the natural fibers.

=== Eyes ===
- Eyeshadow brushes:
  - Flat shader eye brush - This brush can be made either with synthetic or natural fibers and is flat in shape. It is used to pack on powder and cream eyeshadows evenly on the lid area. It is also called a cat's tongue brush.
  - Angled shader brush - This brush is made out of natural fibers, and it has an angle to it. It is used to apply darker shades on the outer corner for a more detailed look.
  - Fluffy blending brush - Usually, blending brushes are made using natural bristles and are fluffy in appearance. It is used to blend out any harsh edges for a seamless effect. It works best with powder products because of the natural fibers.
  - Crease brush - This brush can be made either with natural or synthetic bristles and has a tapered cut to it. It is much smaller than the previous blending brush, and it beautifully blends out the crease color without moving it too much.
  - Pencil brush - This brush is a much smaller version of the previous blending brush, and it is usually made with natural fibers. The pencil brush can be used to add colors to smaller areas and also to blend them without spreading the pigments too much. One can also add brow bone and inner corner highlights; it works well with powders.
- Pointed eyeliner brush - It is made out of synthetic fibers and has a tapered end to it with barely any bristles, which helps with the sharpest and most perfect winged eyeliner.
- Smudge brush - This brush is made out of natural bristles for even application and is best used with powders and creams. It can also be made out of foam with a pointed dome shape. Its primary use is to smudge eyeliner, contour dark eye shadows, or soften hard lines.
- Mascara wand - usually comes with the mascara, but disposable mascara brushes can also be used, usually when mascara is being applied on multiple different people.
- Eyebrow brush - long, thin with tougher bristles
- Lash and brow comb - Keep the brow hairs in place using the brow comb, and the lash comb helps remove mascara clumping together on the lashes to get rid of the spidery lashes.
- Duo brow brush - This is a multitasking brush as you can line your upper lash line using the angled end and also fill in your eyebrows. This brush is usually made using synthetic bristles. It can be used with powders, liquids and creams. The spoolie end of this brush helps to blend in the brow product to make it look as natural as possible.

=== Lips ===
- Lip liner brush - This brush is a little bigger than the fine liner brush and is used to get a crisp outline on the lips.
- Lip brush - This brush is used to fill in the lips using the lip color of one's choice, and it provides an even application.
- Lip gloss applicator- Usually comes with the lip gloss and is normally doe-shaped

== Types of makeup brush bristles ==
Makeup application can alter due to the materials used to create a brush. The bristles of a makeup brush can either be synthetic or natural. In the application of the makeup, the brush itself is important because it can determine how the product is applied: depending on the makeup brush type and its bristles, it could either densely pack or loosely apply the makeup product.

=== Synthetic bristles ===
Synthetic bristles are the most common material used in makeup brushes. These brushes are widely found in drugstores and makeup-specific stores. The bristles are made out of plastic, nylon, or other synthetic fibers and may be dyed. Synthetic bristles are often used with liquid and cream products, as they tend to blend out products more easily and will not absorb product as much as a natural bristle brush. Synthetic brushes are cruelty-free. Synthetic brushes usually last longer than natural-haired bristles as they do not degrade and are not as fragile.

=== Natural bristles ===
The natural bristles are often dark in color, not super soft, shed, hold pigments better and are difficult to wash. As the natural bristles are very porous, they pick up more pigments and distribute them evenly. The natural bristled brushes best apply powder products, and it is best to avoid liquid or cream products as they will drink up most of the products. Although natural bristles are more preferred in the cosmetic industry, the bristles themselves can cause allergic reactions to the animal hair.

Natural bristles may more easily control the product when blending out or even packing on a product because they have hair cuticles.

==== Types of natural bristles ====
- Sable
- Goat
- Badger
- Pony
- Squirrel
- Kolinsky sable
- Weasel (also known as red sable)
