= Western cosmetics in the 1970s =

Western cosmetics in the 1970s reflected the multiple roles ascribed to the modern woman. For the first time since 1900, make-up was chosen situationally, rather than in response to monolithic trends. The era's two primary visions were the feminist-influenced daytime "natural look" and the sexualized evening aesthetic presented by European designers and fashion photographers. In the periphery, punk and glam were also influential. The struggling cosmetics industry attempted to make a comeback, using new marketing and manufacturing practices.

== Influential aesthetics ==
=== Natural look ===
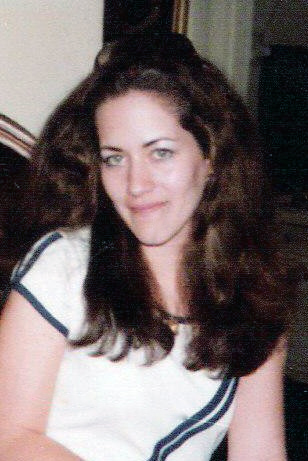
The feminist-influenced "natural look" was popular during the 1970s.

Though some feminists in the 1970s continued to wear cosmetics, many others did not; Susan Brownmiller, for instance, called an unadorned face "the honorable new look of feminism". The cosmetics industry, faced with increasing mainstream rejection of sexual objectification, began to market make-up as "natural" or "invisible". A 1970 ad for Moon Drops "Demi-Makeup" read, "People will think it's your own fresh, flawless skin. (Let them.)" The move toward a natural appearance was also seen in the universal adoption of casual blue jeans across society, and this too was reflected in makeup marketing, with Biba introducing a "Denim Range" in the early 1970s that was intended to harmonize with today's jeans-clad woman. Fragrances were also marketed to the "new woman". Charlie—whose ads featured a no-nonsense, pantsuit-clad, independent woman—was a marketing triumph, becoming the nation's leading scent within a year of its release. Serious, polite, and androgynous cosmetics were seen as appropriate for the business world, where working women felt increasing pressure to present a meticulous appearance.

Similar aesthetics were seen elsewhere in the fashion world. In the 1970s, American fashion designers such as Ralph Lauren and Calvin Klein presented understated, neutral designs accompanied by natural make-up. A similar look was embraced by photographer Francesco Scavullo, makeup artist Way Bandy, and hairstylist Maury Hobson, who collaborated on the covers of Cosmopolitan that established the 1970s "natural look". Bandy's philosophy, described in his book Designing Your Face, held that make-up should be used not as a mask, but rather to alter perception and proportion, creating a personalized "ideal" face.

=== Glamorization ===
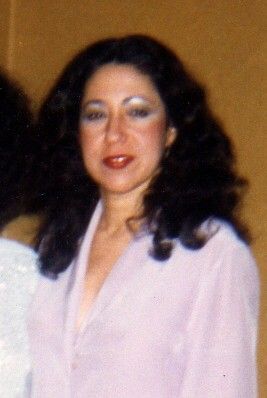
More dramatic makeup was often worn in the evenings.

Make-up used by European fashion designers in the 1970s presented a sensual look for women in striking contrast to the "natural look". Though models in Yves Saint Laurent's hugely influential runway shows wore menswear and short, slicked-back hair, their lips were glossy and bright red. YSL's cosmetics line also employed intense, feminine colors. In the violent, sexual porno chic fashion photography of French and Italian Vogue, women wore blood-red lipstick, glossy red nail polish, pencil-thin eyebrows and black eye make-up. Women employed this vision of beauty for evenings, when they could aim to seduce in the era's discos.

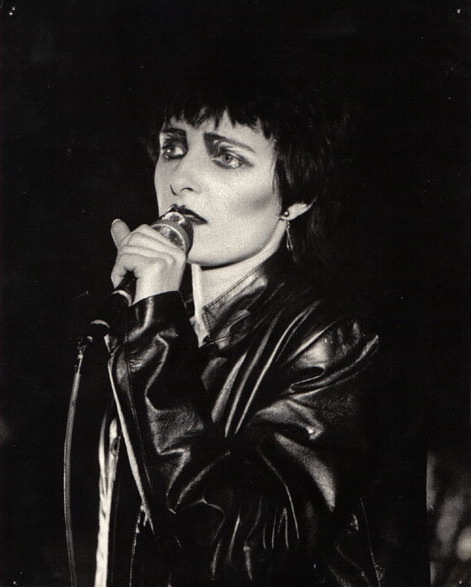
Punk singer Siouxsie

In 1974, raspberry-coloured lip gloss, and pencil-thin eyebrows were popular trends

=== Punk ===
The punk movement that emerged in the late 1970s aimed to provoke rather than follow the trends of the day. The movement, described as "anti-beauty" by Kate de Castelbajac, embraced intentionally artificial and aggressive make-up, tattooing, and body piercing to shock observers. Black, fluorescents, and neo-tribalism were major aesthetic elements.

Images of glam rockers like Alice Cooper, David Bowie, and Lou Reed in the pages of Rolling Stone established the influence of another extreme aesthetic. The glam style drew on transvestism, androgyny, decadence, and camp; its "blasé sophistication" stood in marked contrast to the innocence and sincerity of the 1960s.Glitter eye shadow and nail varnish were popular during this period.

== Product developments and trends ==
Women tended to wear lighter foundation in the 1970s, which greatly increased the market for skin care products. Anti-aging products were also increasingly important.

Intensely colored blush carried over from the 1960s to the early 1970s. Tube blush was also extremely popular. Lipstick in the 1970s tended to be either color or gloss; popular hues included deep pink, purple, and raspberry.

Improvements in chemistry enabled the introduction of waterproof mascara along with better lash lengtheners and thickeners. Matte colors were popular for eyes, in contrast to the iridescence that characterized 1960s make-up. The decade's competing visions of beauty were seen in its dichotomy of eye shadow colors: both dramatic, smoky dark gray and transparent, natural beiges and grays were popular.

== Cosmetics industry developments ==
The health of the beauty industry declined in the 1970s, as the growth of cosmetics sales failed to keep pace with overall growth in personal spending. The industry, according to a 1979 article in W magazine, had "lost its glamour". Rather than developing innovative products, many companies had depended on price increases for profitability. Consumers considered cosmetics companies outdated, uncreative, and dogmatic, and manufacturers received negative publicity regarding the safety of cosmetics ingredients, animal testing, microbial contamination, and the possibility of acne caused by cosmetics.

The cosmetics industry responded to these challenges in several ways. New products were introduced, especially in skin care and sunscreen lines. Manufacturers emphasized cost controls, quality, and selectivity in product introductions. They also expanded into the ethnic, teen, and men's markets. "Natural" ingredients were incorporated into cosmetics to satisfy growing tastes for organic products.

New marketing and presentation practices also emerged. The custom of having a model as the contractually exclusive "face" of a single company arose when Revlon hired Lauren Hutton to promote their Ultima II line. The strategy was quickly adopted by other companies; notable 1970s spokesmodels included Karen Graham for Estée Lauder, Margaux Hemingway for Babe, and Catherine Deneuve for Chanel. Cosmetics companies also focused on service and appearance at the point of purchase. Clinique's projection of an image of scientific authority using immaculate make-up counters attended by white-coated employees was representative.

Business structures were also in flux. Revlon acquired smaller cosmetics firms, while Max Factor, Elizabeth Arden, and Helena Rubenstein were purchased by larger conglomerates. Independent businesswomen such as Adrien Arpel, Suzanne Grayson, and Madeleine Mono established small, consumer-focused companies to challenge mega-firms.

== See also ==
- History of cosmetics
- Fashion in the 1970s
