= Face powder =

Cosmetic product applied to the face

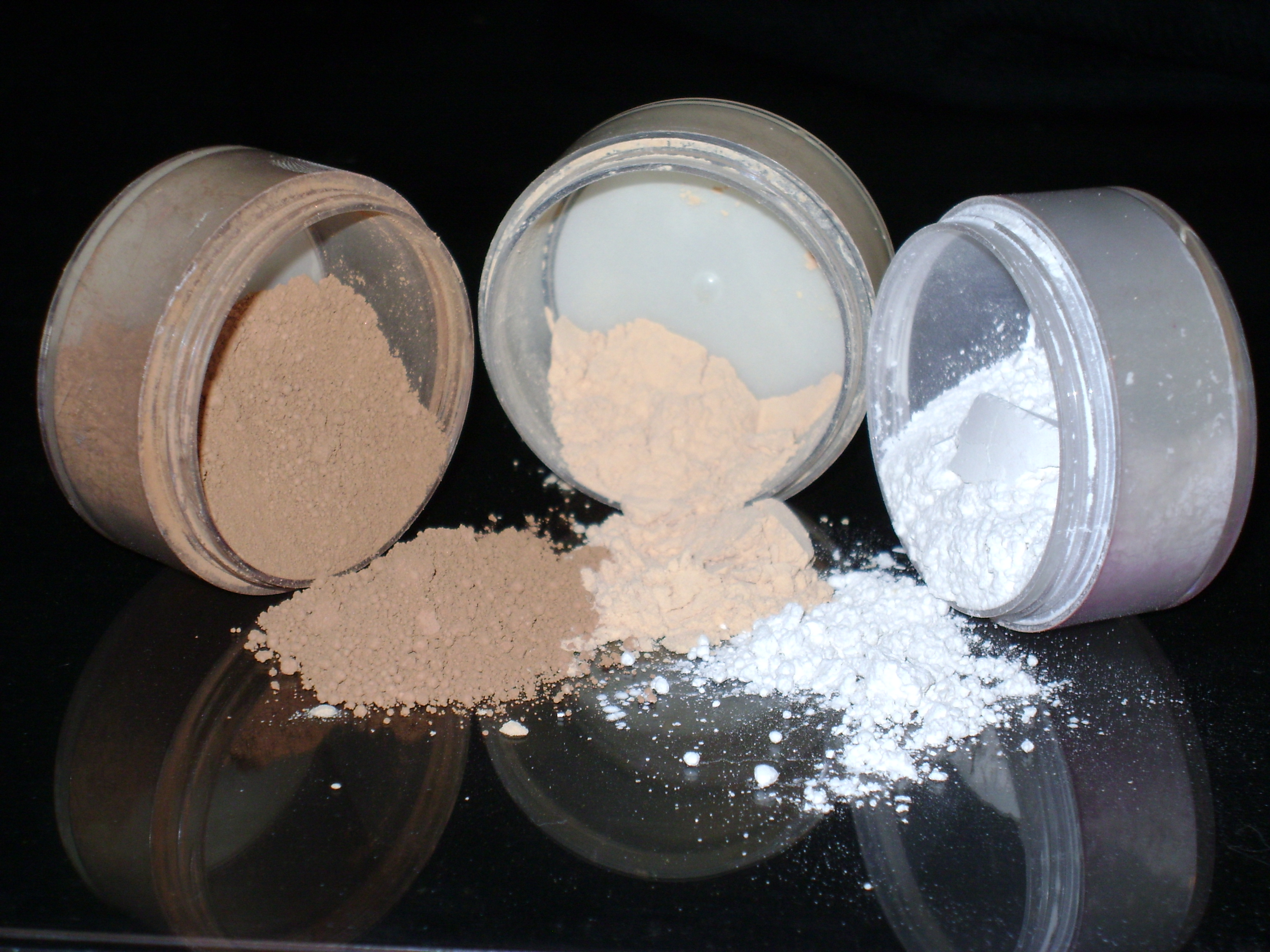
Loose face powder in three different shades

Face powder is a cosmetic product applied to the face to serve different functions, typically to beautify the face. Originating from ancient Egypt, face powder has had different social uses across cultures; in the modern era, it is typically used to set makeup, brighten the skin and contour the face. Face powders generally come in two main types. One type is loose powder, which is used to assist with oily skin in absorbing excess moisture and mattifying the face to reduce shininess. The other is pressed powder, which conceals blemishes and maximises coverage.

The use of face powder has contributed to beauty standards throughout history. In ancient Europe and Asia, a whitened face with a smooth complexion signalled a woman of high status. The prevalence of this trend was carried throughout the Crusades and Medieval era. During this time, women used harmful ingredients as face powder including bleaches, lead and lye.

== Early history ==
=== Egypt ===
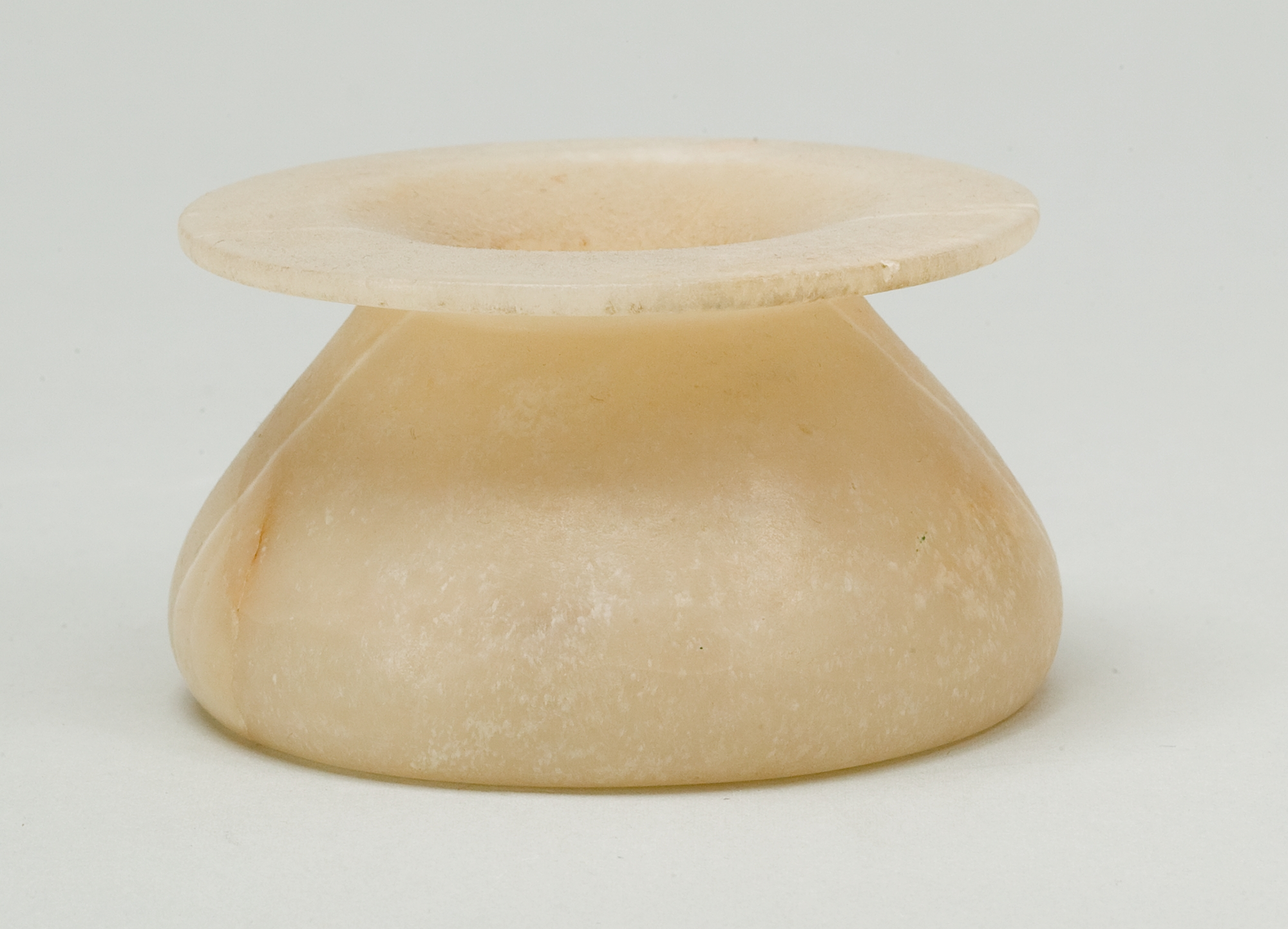
A stone cosmetics jar retrieved from ancient Egyptian remains

Archaeological remains and chemical analyses indicate the use of face powder dating back from between 2000 and 1200 BC, and include lead fibres, a common cosmetic ingredient used in ancient Egypt. Kohl jars used to store eyeliner as well as stone containers holding face powder were discovered in graves as this promised the ancient Egyptians eternal beauty in the afterlife. Men and women used an early form of rouge powdered blush for their cheeks which was made from red ochre. Greek queen Cleopatra heavily influenced the ancient Egyptian beauty standard with a distinctive make-up style, inspiring the ancient Egyptians to paint their eyes with green and blue powders. Face powder was also considered to have medicinal purposes to protect people from illness.

=== Greece ===
Ancient Egyptian beauty trends travelled across the Mediterranean and influenced cosmetic practices in Greece. Using similar ingredients, ancient Greeks used cinnabar as a powdered rouge for the face as well as brightening their complexion with white lead. While the desire for a white complexion represented social ideas about race superiority, skin tone also enforced gender as in ancient times, women were paler than men, due to having less haemoglobin. A sign of belonging to the upper class was white, unblemished skin free from sun-exposure, as it was the life of wealthy women that involved staying indoors. Traces of the skin-lightening face powder made from white lead have been uncovered from the graves of wealthy ancient Greek women. The city of Athens was nearby the Laurion mines, from which the Greeks extracted vast amounts of silver and obtained a great deal of their wealth through trade. White lead was found in the mines as a by-product of the silver, from which ancient Greeks produced face powder. The use of face powder also appears in the work of ancient Greek writers. Writer and historian Xenophon writes of women who "rubbed in white lead to the face to appear whiter". In his book Oeconominicus, Ancient Greek poet Eubulus in his play Stephanopolides compares lower class and upper-class women, declaring that poor women "are not plastered over with white lead". While it was known the white lead was poisonous, the ancient Greeks were not deterred from applying the face powder to fulfil their beauty standards.

=== Rome ===
The ancient Roman use of face powder was centred around the Roman ideal of femininity and beauty standards, expressing signs of social and health status. The pale complexion was desired by Roman women and is frequently expressed in the poetry of ancient Roman poet Ovid. Small glass jars and brushes from archaeological remains suggest the storage and use of face powder. Ancient Roman poets Juvenal and Martial mention a mistress named "Chione" in their works, which literally translates to "snowy" or "cold", referring to the desired fair complexion of ancient Roman women. Skin whitening as well as sun-blocking were practiced by applying face powder in the form of cerussa, which was a mix of white lead shavings and vinegar. Roman women wished to conceal blemishes and freckles, as well as smoothing the skin using this powder. Chalk was also used to whiten the skin, as well as powdered ash and saffron on the eyes.

=== China ===
Ancient Chinese women desired whitened skin for beauty as their use of face powder dates back to the Spring and Autumn period from 770 to 476 BC. An early form of face powder was prepared by grinding fine rice which was applied to the face. In addition, pearls were crushed to create pearl powder that improved facial appearance and was also used as a medicine to treat eye diseases, acne and tuberculosis. Chinese empress Wu Zetian used pearl powder to maintain radiant skin. Lead was also a common ingredient used for face powder and remained popular for its skin-whitening properties.

== Renaissance through 19th century ==
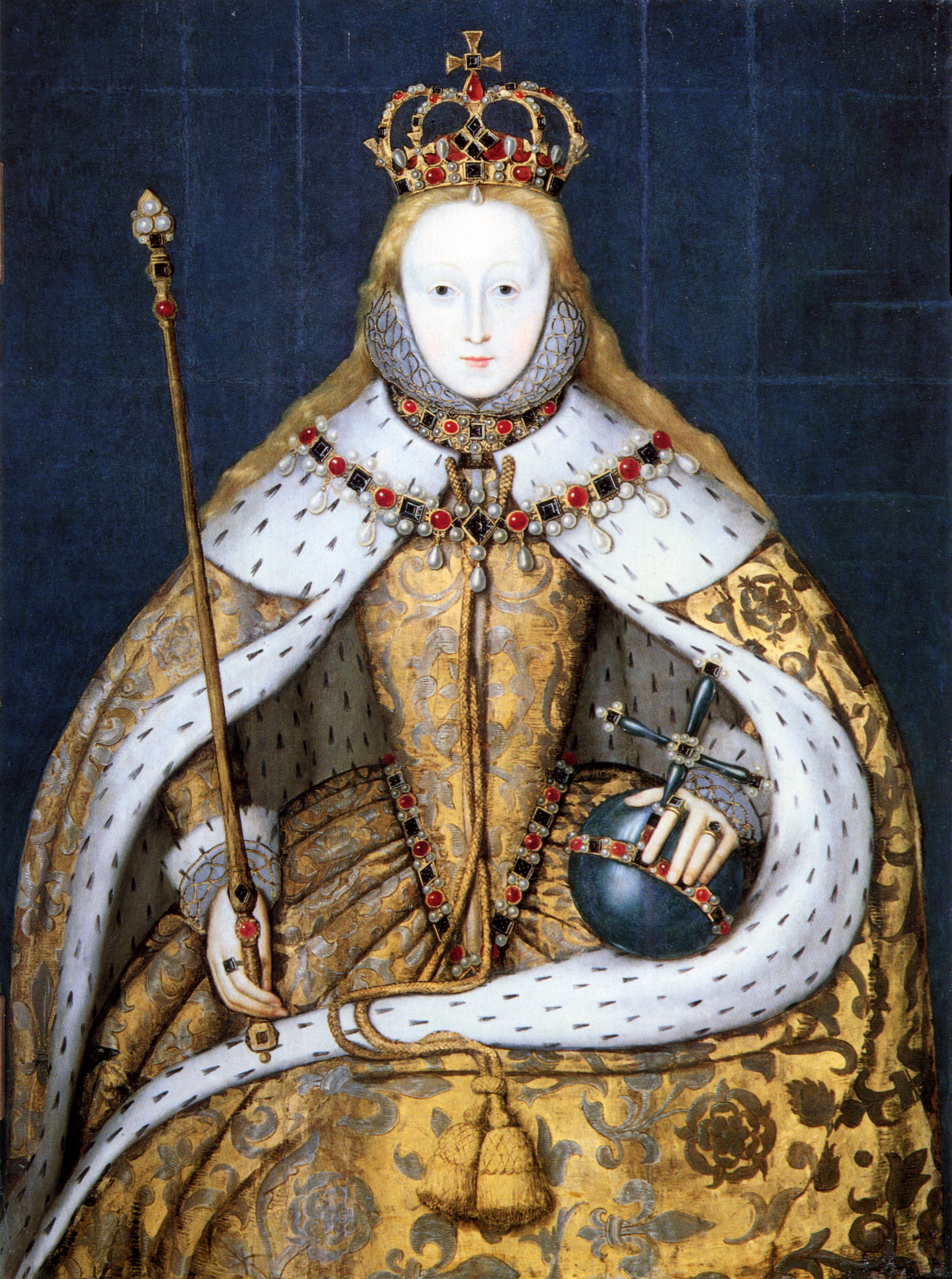
Portrait of Queen Elizabeth I with whitened, powdered skin

At a time of prevalent disease, beauty in the Middle Ages was characterised by having clear, bright skin that signalled fertility and good health. Lead-based powders were continually used throughout the 16th century by the noble class as Queen Elizabeth I was known to use face powder to conceal her smallpox scars. The leading cause of her death was blood poisoning, primarily due to her cosmetic practices of using makeup containing toxic materials, including the lead-based face powder. Works of art from the Renaissance reinforced the idealised image of beauty and influenced the use of face powder. The social uses of face powder to maintain whitened, unblemished skin is visible in Renaissance art pieces including The Birth of Venus by Sandro Botticelli. Shakespeare's works comment on femininity and the culture of cosmetic use at the time, specifically with his references to silver, indicative of the desired glistening complexion achieved with the use of pearl face powder.

With the outbreak of smallpox in 1760, fewer women used face powder due to how it aggravated the skin and revealed facial scarring. During the Victorian era, noticeable make-up became less popular as women desired to look naturally beautiful and hence, powders derived from zinc oxides were used to maintain ivory coloured skin.

== Recent history ==
=== 20th century ===
During the Edwardian era, makeup for women was used to enhance natural beauty and many young women applied light face powder on a daily basis. Influenced by traditional beauty standards, women preferred pale, whitened and powdered skin throughout the early 1900s. However, in the 1920s, Hollywood became the main inspiration for beauty in America and powdering the face shifted from an upper-class practice to that of the social-class as the powdered face look became associated with prostitutes and movie stars. Due to growing popularity, the end of the decade saw a rise of cosmetic brands with over 1300 brands of face powder, which eventuated in a 52-million-dollar industry. Early makeup developers including Elizabeth Arden and Helena Rubinstein produced skin care products and powders that attracted an international market. Cosmetics for women of colour during this time were also in production, with the first face powder for African-American women created by Anthony Overton in 1898, called the High-Brown Face Powder. Overton made multiple darker tones of face powder with product names including "nut-brown", "olive-tone", "brunette" and "soft-pink", and by 1920, his sales earned him a Dun and Bradstreet Credit rating of one million dollars. Other African-American entrepreneurs also marketed cosmetics despite discrimination during the Jim Crow era, including Annie Turnbo Malone who sold face powder in darker shades which developed into a multi-million dollar business. Businesswoman Madam C. J. Walker retailed face powders for African American women in drugstores despite the controversy caused as skin bleaching for fairer skin was a popular beauty trend at the time. Hungarian-American businessman Morton Neumann established his own cosmetic company in 1926, Valmor Products Co., and marketed darker-toned face powders for black women which retailed for 60 cents each.

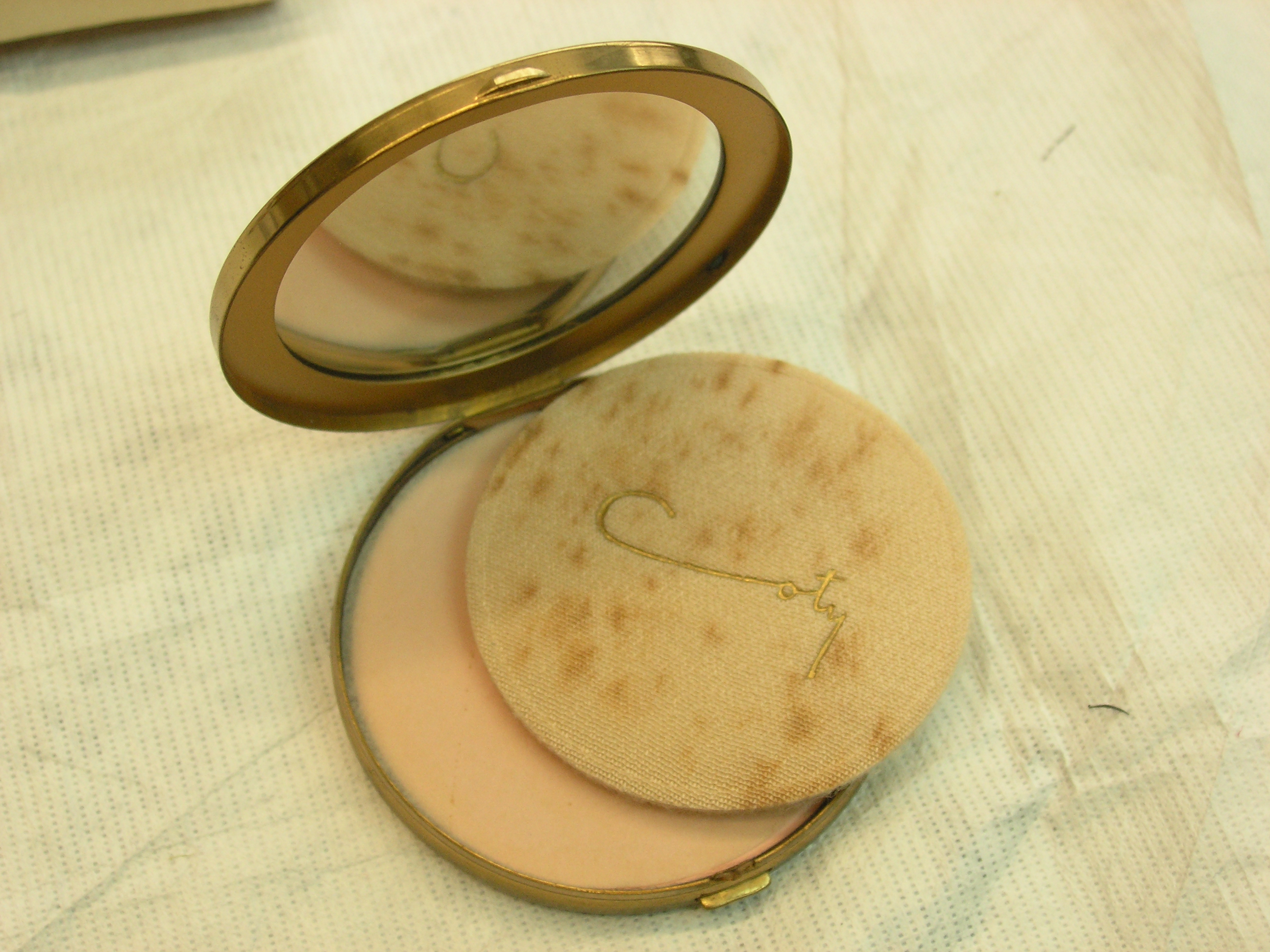
Pale compact face powder with a powder puff applicator from the 1930s

In the 1930s, face powder remained a staple cosmetic product and its increased demand raised health concerns about lead based powders that were still in use. As a result, the Food, Drugs and Cosmetics Act was passed in 1938 to regulate the ingredients used in cosmetics and ensure they were safe for use. Due to World War Two rationing in the 1940s, cosmetics were not as widely available, yet a powdered, beautified face remained the desired beauty trend. In 1942, the American War Production Board sought to conserve materials by placing restrictions on the production of certain cosmetics. Face powder was found to be a heavily used product by women and remained in production during wartime as cosmetics were considered essential products for women's self-expression and autonomy. The interwar period in Germany in 1935 also saw that cosmetics were on demand, accounting for 48% of magazine advertising with face powder being a staple item.

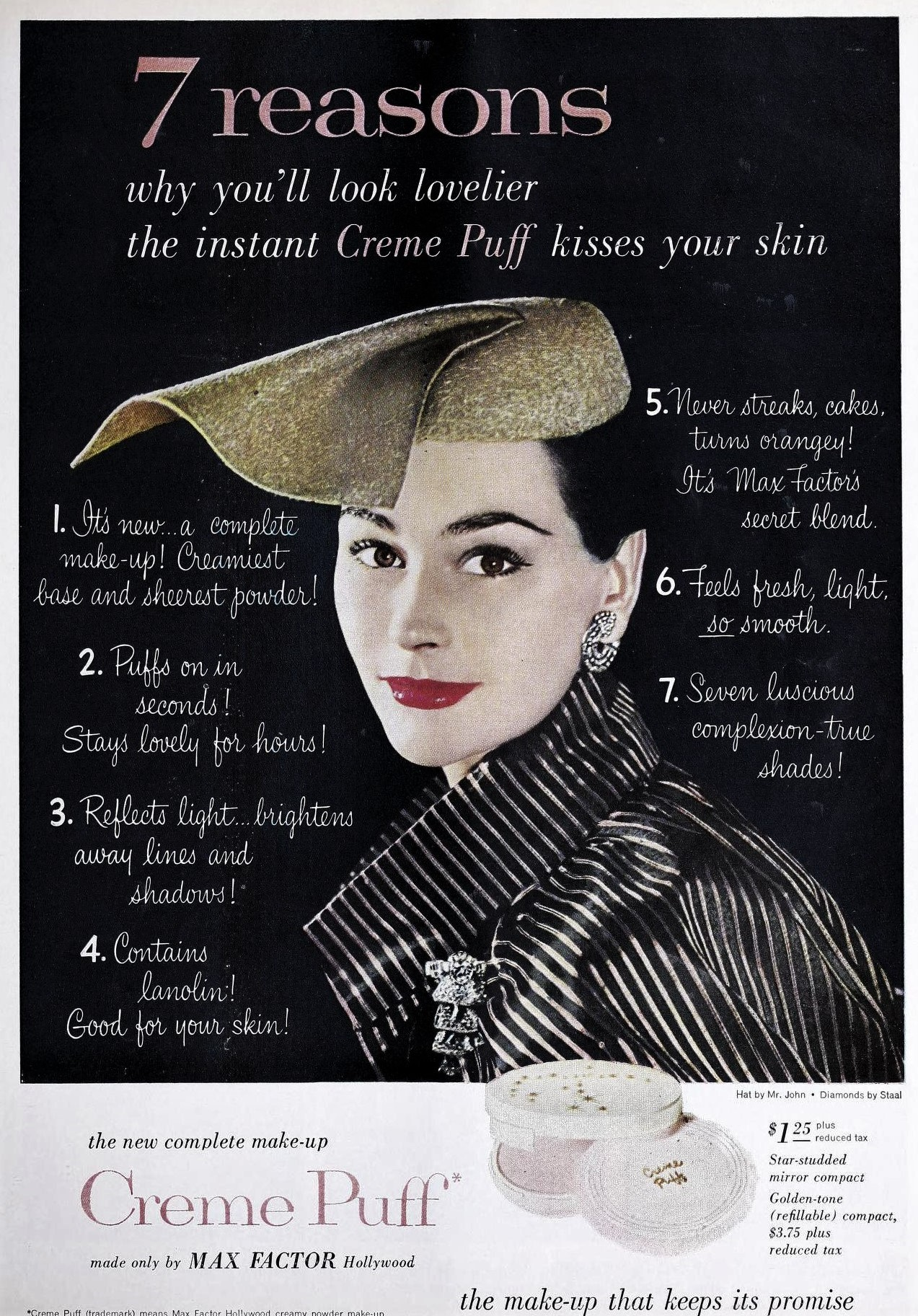
An advertisement for Max Factor's 'Creme Puff' face powder from 1954

Following the Second World War, rationing in America had ceased and the cosmetic industry flourished. With the popularity of female Hollywood stars including Marilyn Monroe and Audrey Hepburn, American television culture influenced the 1950s beauty trend of clear, beautified skin. Max Factor, the leading cosmetic brand at the time, introduced the Crème Puff, the first ever multipurpose face powder that offered an all-in-one base, setting and finishing powder. The 1970s that saw a widespread inclusion of diversity with new cosmetic brands offering face powder with darker shades. By 1977, cosmetics for black women became a $1.5 billion industry, with darker shades of powders, foundation and lipsticks available in stores around the US. By the 1990s, face powder became a staple cosmetic product for not only concealing blemishes but setting makeup in place. The Australian Government's National Industrial Chemicals Notification and Assessment Scheme was established in 1990 to ensure that industrial chemicals used in face powders and other cosmetics are safe for citizens to use.

=== 21st century ===
The changing conceptions of masculinity during the 2000s led to evolving beauty trends that saw cosmetic products sold to men including facial scrubs, face powders and eye shadow. The use of face makeup has expanded to include males who desire an enhanced look, using face powder to achieve a chiselled complexion. As cosmetics in contemporary society are diverse in shade range options, modern face powder enhances natural skin tones and most brands cater for all skin types. 21st century cosmetic trends are heavily influenced by beauty icons and the face powder application technique known as ‘baking’ has been popularised by socialite Kim Kardashian West. Baking involves patting translucent face powder under the eyes, the 'T' zone, beneath the cheek bones, along the jawline and on the sides of the nose, allowing it to sit for a few minutes while the foundation is absorbed by the skin's body heat, then brushing it off. This technique creates a pore-less and creaseless look that is a desired make-up beauty standard in modern times.

== Modern uses ==
Modern face powders are currently available in different types to serve multiple functions. The six main types of face powder include loose powder, pressed powder, mineral powder, translucent powder, HD powder and finishing powder.

=== Loose powder ===
Loose powder can be translucent or coloured and is generally packaged in a jar. It has a fine consistency with small particles and is used to give light coverage to the skin for a smooth, silky texture. Coloured loose powders work to minimise redness by colour-correcting. Loose powder is also used to set make-up, meaning it locks in the foundation and concealer underneath to smoothen out the complexion and limit cracks and lines in the skin.

=== Pressed powder ===
Pressed powder is available in different shades and is sold in a compound container. It is compressed to provide a travel-friendly product for on-the-go touch-ups. Pressed powders give coverage to the face, concealing blemishes and discolouration, therefore can be used as a light coverage foundation. The particles in pressed powder are larger than those in loose powder and can give off a thick, clotted appearance when overused. Pressed powder can also be used for setting makeup.

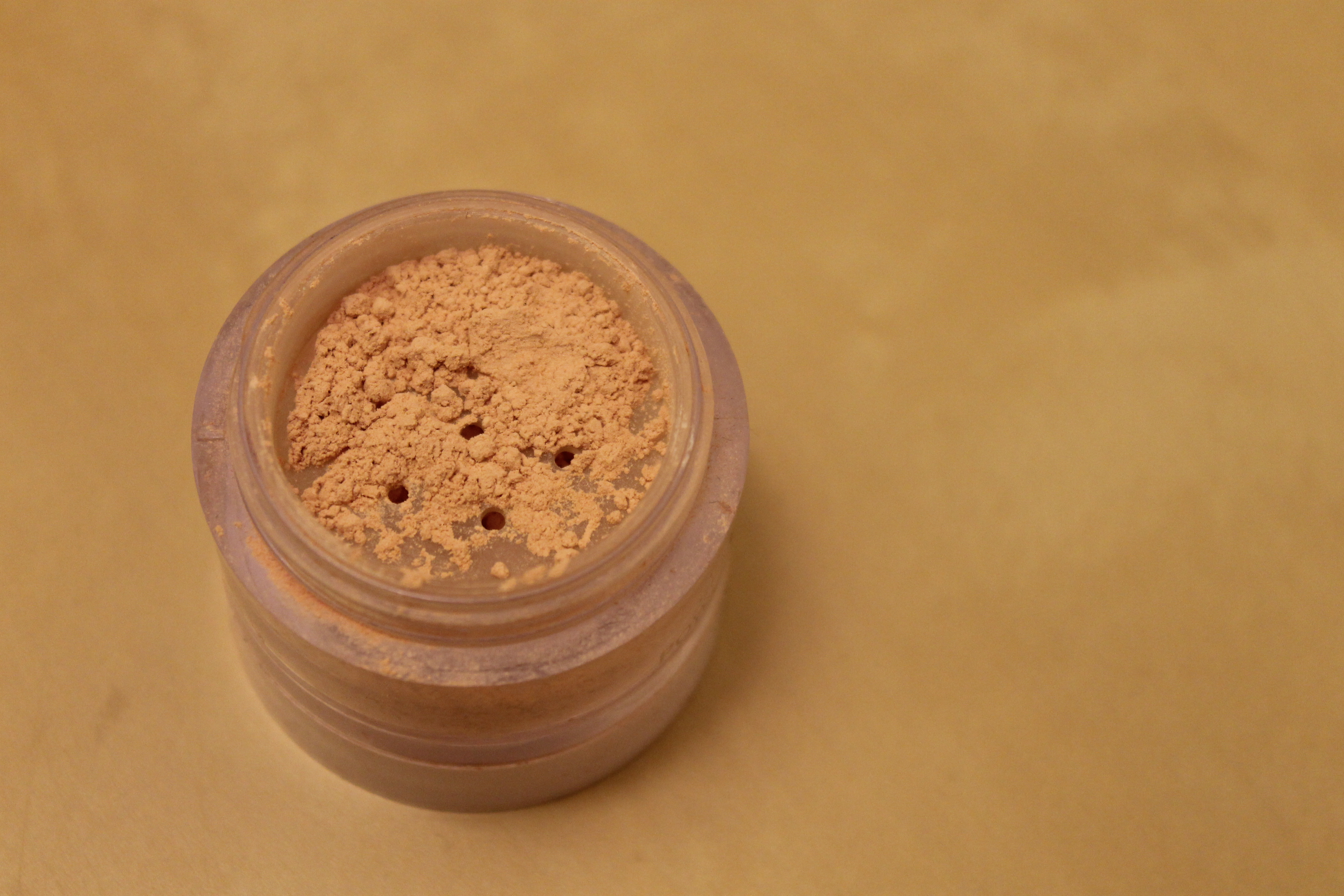
Loose mineral face powder

=== Mineral powder ===
Mineral powder can contain ground and milled particles of iron, talc, zinc and titanium dioxides. Mineral powders are usually fragrance and preservative free.

=== Translucent powder ===
Translucent powder is available in both pressed and loose forms. Its use is to mattify the skin to reduce oiliness and shine. It can be used for the 'baking' application technique, by brightening up certain areas of the face, offering a long-lasting wear.

=== HD powder ===
High definition powder is mainly used for people featuring in high-definition film and video to prevent camera flashback, which is the white patches of powdered areas that are highlighted by a camera flash. Available in both pressed and loose forms, HD powder can reduce skin shininess, soften out the skin and mattify it.

=== Finishing powder ===
Finishing powder is mainly used to minimise fine lines and pores. It can even out the skin texture and blur out imperfections, used as a final product to complete makeup. It is available in both pressed and loose forms.

== Ingredients ==
Toxic and harmful chemicals are rare in face powders today. Modern powders contain ingredients that can conceal blemishes and smoothen out the skin due to their absorbency. The most common ingredients used to make face powder include the following.

Ingredient	Component	Other names
Silica	Silica oxide	Quartz, Silicic oxide, crystalline silica, pure silica, silicea, silica sand
Starch	Polymeric carbohydrate	Amylum
Talc	Silicate mineral	French chalk
Dimethicone	Polymer, silicone	PDMS, dimethylpolysiloxane, E900
Zirconium silicate	Zircon	Zircon, zirconium orthosilicate
Zinc oxide	Zincite	Zinc white, calamine, philosopher's wool, Chinese white, flowers of zinc
Titanium dioxide	Rutile and anatase	Titanium oxide, titania, rutile, anatase, brookite
Kaolin	Silicate, oxygen, alumina octahedra	Kaolinite
Magnesium Carbonate	Magnesium and carbonate salt	Magnesite

== See also ==
- Foundation
- Rouge
- Baking
- Compact
- Sunscreen
- Concealer
- Borak (cosmetic)
- Thanaka
