= Baking (make-up) =

Make-up technique

Baking is a make-up technique which includes applying a heavy amount of translucent powder under the eyes and on the high points of the face, including the 'T' zone, to set the base make-up. It is also used to extract oils from the face.

This technique can be used on a variety of different skin types and shades to highlight the under eye area and high points of the face such as the cheek bones, the bridge of the nose, the chin and the forehead. The effects of the powder are to soak up facial oils and to help the foundation melt into the skin. This prevents creasing in the baked areas while maximising coverage and longevity of the make-up to leave the face looking matte.

== Background and popularisation ==
The cosmetic technique of baking is a "very old make-up technique". In recent years, this technique was brought into light with the increased visibility of the drag community following the television show RuPaul's Drag Race. The technique of baking can be seen throughout the episodes when the queens prepare for the runway. Baking is not just used for drag performers; it has been adopted by many make-up artists and is now used throughout special effects make-up to set bruising and cuts so that the products applied to the face melt in seamlessly and look as realistic as possible. Miss Fame, a season 7 contestant on Drag Race, uses this technique on social media make-up tutorials on YouTube.

This technique was then popularised further by many bloggers and vloggers who have created videos and pages, teaching make-up enthusiasts and the general public how use this technique. This type of tutorial has taken over social media sites such as YouTube and Instagram, bringing baking into the mainstream as a new internet 'buzzword'.

== Uses ==
As seen above there are different ways in which one can bake the face. Jamie Greenberg, a make-up artist, said that baking falls under the umbrella of contouring, which includes highlighting and shading. Therefore, baking can be used alongside contouring as a non-shimmery form of highlighting to emphasize the higher points of the face. Paired with contouring, it can also work to give the illusion of definition. Baking directly underneath the contour on the cheekbones can create a more crisp and clean contour. Paired with a highlighter or a strobing cream or powder, baking can set a base for a highlight, as well as intensifying it.

Baking is used by many performers as it increases the longevity of the make-up, meaning it will not easily melt or rub off during performances. This technique is utilised by many make-up artists for celebrities and models as "a way to set your make-up when standing under hot lights", as it reduces the need for touch-ups. It also increases the coverage of the make-up giving a more poreless and flawless, matte finish to the face, something which works well for celebrities and performers especially when flash photography is being used.

Baking can also be used as a form of colour correction. People tend to get dark circles under their eyes, baking this area is said to reduce the appearance of dark circles as the light shade and brightness from the powder or concealer can counteract the darkness around the eyes. People often bake their under eyes to reduce dark circles and also to prevent creasing in their fine lines and wrinkles, especially in the under eye area. Although, many make-up artists argue that this is not a good technique for ageing skin.

Finally, make-up artists also use baking for practical reasons. For example, when applying eye shadow, they often bake under the eyes to catch any eye shadow that may fall down onto the face from its application, allowing the product to be easily brushed away with the excess powder.
