= Ernő László =

Dermatologist, businessman (1897–1973)

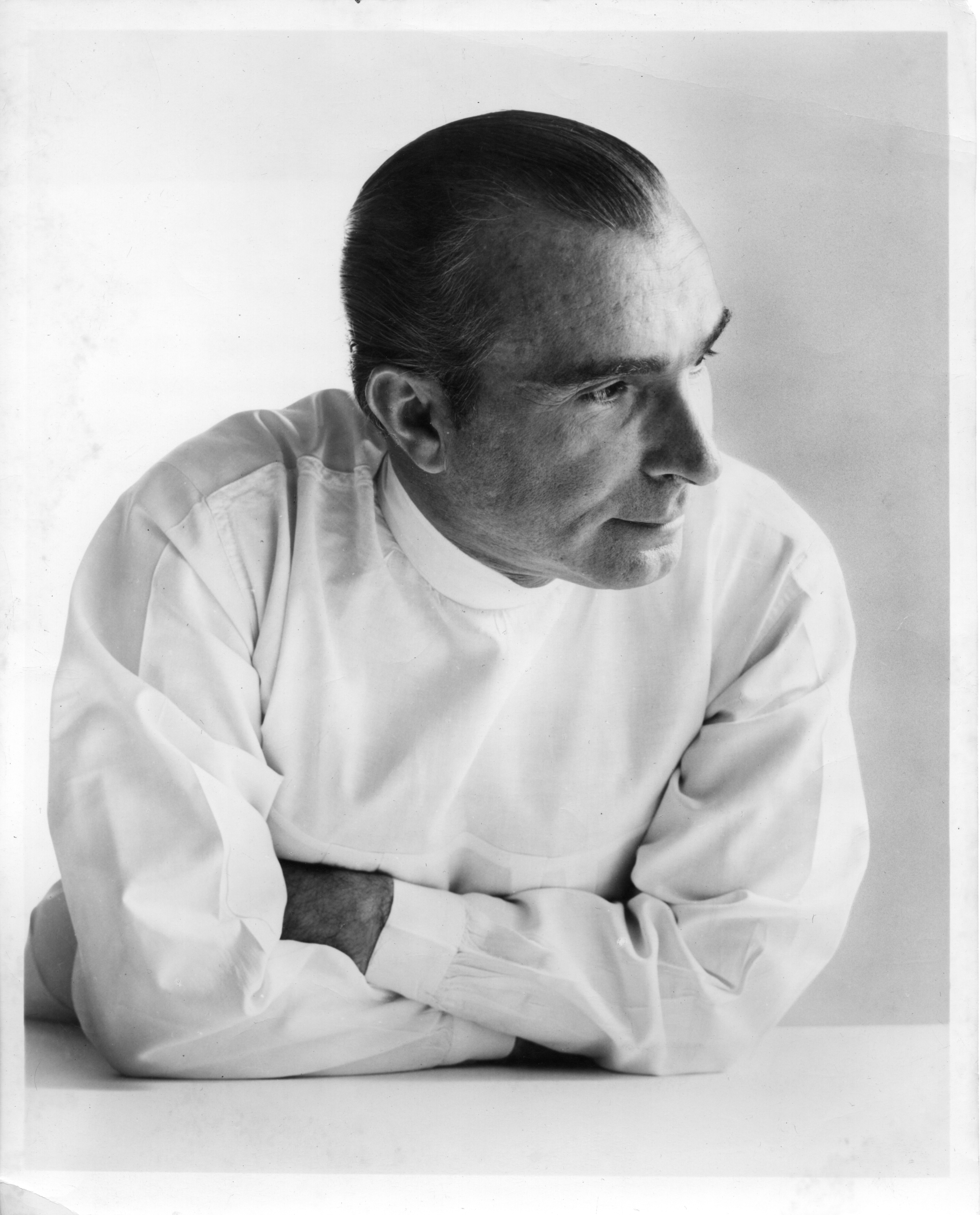
- Born: 11 July 1897; Nyitrazsámbokrét, Hungary (now Žabokreky nad Nitrou, Slovakia)
- Died: March 1973 (aged 75)
- Citizenship: Hungarian; American
- Education: Royal Hungarian University of Medical Sciences
- Occupation: Dermatologist
- Spouses: Irén Gombaszögi (m. 1929; died 1967) Sibille Schulz (m. 1970–1973)

Ernő László (11 July 1897 – March 1973) was a Hungarian-American dermatologist and cosmetics businessman who founded The Ernő László Institute.

== Early life ==
László was born in the Kingdom of Hungary and raised in Budapest. He studied skin pathology and skin disease at the Royal Hungarian University of Medical Sciences in Budapest, and completed his clinical studies in Berlin, Germany, under Max Joseph.

In 1927, László opened his first institute in Budapest with his brother, William Laszlo, the dr. Med. László Institute for Scientific Cosmetology. He achieved fame when he created a special foundation cream for Princess Stéphanie of Belgium who lost her self-confidence due to an acute case of acne. His reputation was further solidified after he treated actress Frida Gombaszoegi's facial scars after being shot in the face by a man she rejected. Soon, women from all ranks of society wanted to see László for skin and make-up advice.

== The Ernő László Institute ==
In 1939, at the onset of World War II, László moved to New York. On 3 November 1939, the New York Herald Tribune reported that the Ernő László Institute, specializing in beauty treatments and cosmetics, had leased a floor in a building on 677 Fifth Avenue, Manhattan. László's poor command of the English language threatened his institute, for despite the efforts of a language coach he could not pass the American Medical Association's accreditation examinations.

The Ernő László Institute was aimed at the rich, famous and powerful. One needed to be recommended to gain admittance. Among his clients were the Duchess of Windsor, Doris Duke, Marjorie Merriweather Post, Greta Garbo, Lillian Gish, Grace Kelly, Ava Gardner, Cecil Beaton, Katharine Hepburn, Paulette Goddard, Audrey Hepburn, Marilyn Monroe, and Jacqueline Kennedy Onassis.

In the early 1940s, Helena Rubinstein approached László and offered to buy his business, but he declined. In 1945, László became a United States citizen. In 1966, László entered the retail marketplace, with partner Chesebrough-Ponds, which later bought the Ernő László Institute.

== Personal life ==
László married actress Irén Gombaszögi, whom he met while treating her sister, fellow actress Frida Gombaszögi. His wife died of leukemia in 1967. Three years later, in 1970, he married Sibille Schulz in a ceremony near Lugano, Switzerland.

== Death and legacy ==
László died of heart failure in March 1973.

In 1995, the company László founded was bought by Mana Products from Elizabeth Arden. Mana Products' founder, Nikos Mouyiaris, had once worked for Ernő László as a chemist. The company was purchased in 2002 by Cradle Holdings Inc., a division of corporate finance group Fox Paine. In February 2011, the RBS Special Opportunities Fund, managed by RBS Equity Finance, backed Charles Denton in the acquisition of Ernő László.
