= Periorbital hyperpigmentation =

Darker skin around the eyes

- Other names: Genetic darker eyelids / undereyes, periocular melanosis, cutaneous hyperchromia
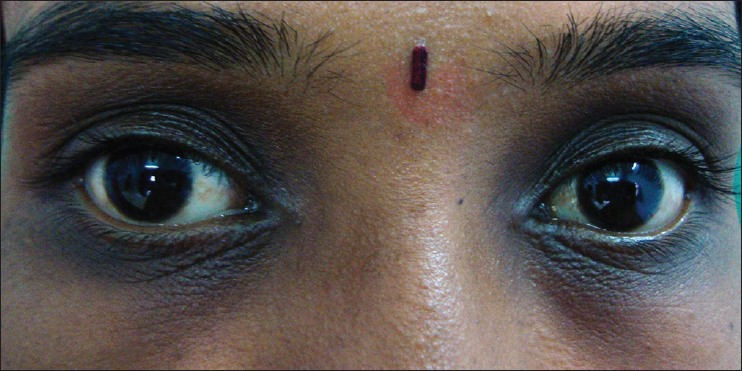
- Woman with hereditary dark circles
- Specialty: Dermatology

Periorbital hyperpigmentation, also known as hereditary dark circles, is characterized by darker skin around the eyes caused by the presence of additional melanin. It is a common hereditary human characteristic and is frequently found on individuals with dark skin. Periorbital hyperpigmentation is most prevalent within the 16–25 age group.

== See also ==
- Eye shadow
- Kohl (cosmetics)
- Freckles
