= Concealer =

Type of cosmetic

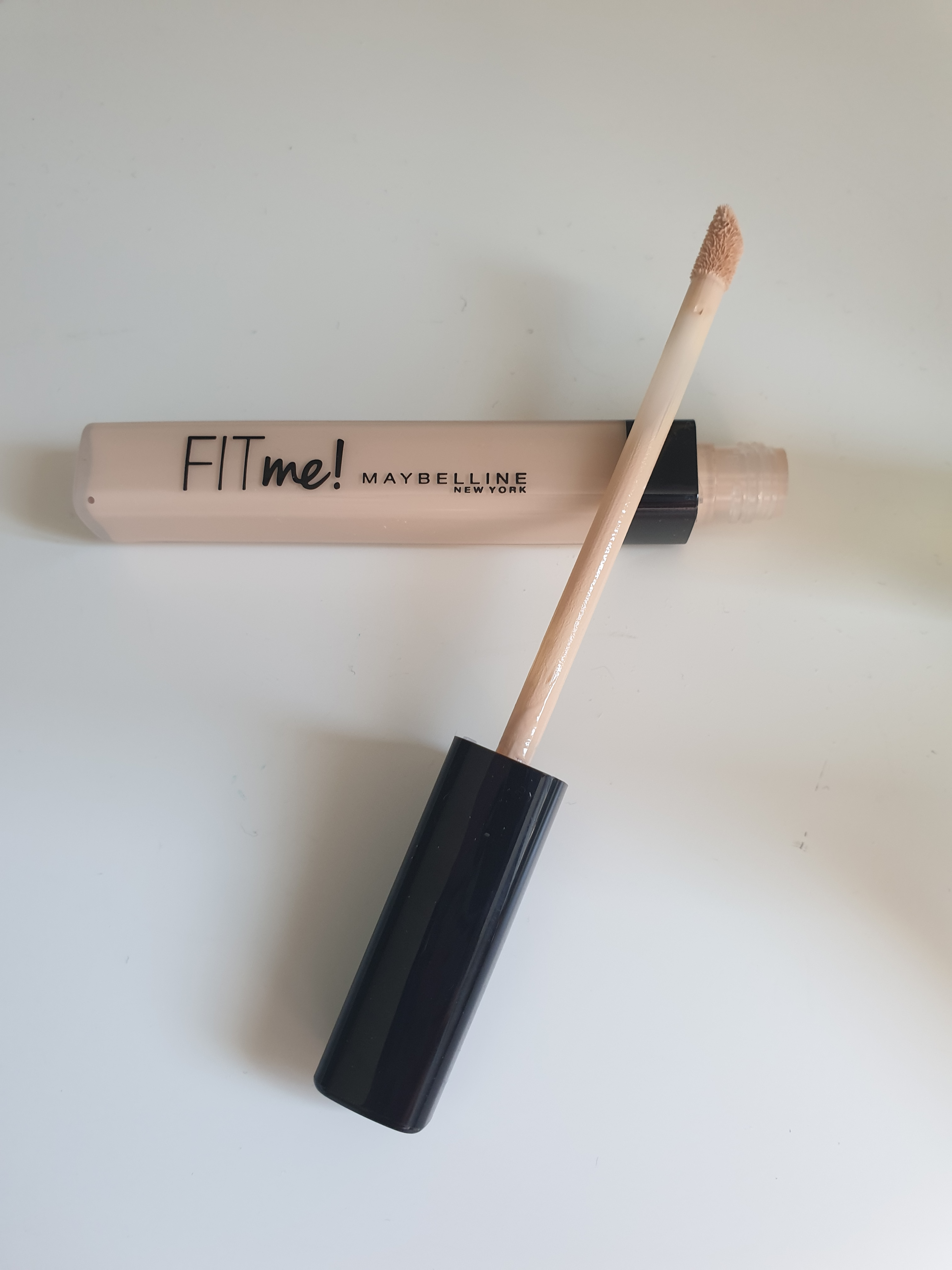
Liquid concealer

Concealer is a type of cosmetic that is used to mask imperfections on the skin. These imperfections can include dark circles under the eyes, blemishes, and hyperpigmentation. Concealer is similar to, and can be used in conjunction with foundation, a lighter cosmetic that is used to even out the skin tone. Both concealer and foundation are typically used to make skin appear smoother and more uniform in color. These two types of cosmetics differ in that concealers tend to be more heavily pigmented, though concealer and foundation are both available in a wide range of colors and opacities.

To use a concealer, an individual typically applies a small amount of product to the area of the skin that they want to cover. The concealer is then blended into the surrounding skin using a brush, sponge, or the fingertips to create a seamless finish. Concealers can be applied before or after foundation, depending on the desired effect. Applying concealer before foundation can help to create a more even canvas for the foundation, while applying concealer after foundation can help to touch up any areas that still require coverage.

Concealers comes in different forms such as liquid, cream, stick, pencil, and powder. The first commercially available concealer was Max Factor's Erace, launched in 1954. Camouflage makeup is a much heavier pigmented form of concealer. It is used to cover serious skin discolorations such as birthmarks, scars and vitiligo.

Concealer is available in a variety of shades. When picking a concealer, people tend to choose one or two shades lighter than their skin tone to better hide their blemishes and dark circles under the eye; once blended out and then set with a powder, it will be smooth and resemble more youthful skin. Some colors are intended to look like a natural skin tone, while others are meant to cancel out the color of a particular type of blemish. Concealers with yellow undertones are used to hide dark circles. Green and blue can counteract red patches on the skin, such as those caused by pimples, broken veins, or rosacea. A purple-tinted concealer can make sallow (yellowish) complexions look brighter.

== Forms ==
Each type of concealer is unique and has qualities that are better suited for different skin types.

- Liquid concealer – Available in squeezable tubes, cylindrical tubes, or square tubes (also known as vials). Leaves a satin, radiant shimmer or matte finish. Liquid concealer is the most popular because it works for most skin types. This concealer also works well for acne spots because it will not bunch up around the acne or settle into the scars. The concealer does have to be set with powder or else it will crease into the fine lines of your skin. Liquid concealers can also have buildable coverage in different finishes to suit every need. A satin finish may look more natural on areas of drier skin. Best suited for normal, combination, oily, or sensitive skin and skin that is prone to breakouts. Little risk of irritating pimples.
- Stick concealer – Leaves a matte or satin finish. Both finishes are long-lasting and will not crack or bleed. Stick concealer is used for very specific purposes because it is thicker than liquid and contains a lot of coverage. This type of concealer is also very convenient because of the packaging and its ability to be used for touchups. This concealer works best on blemishes and small areas of discoloration. The formula is very creamy and blends easily into the skin allowing for flawless touchups throughout the day. Best suited for normal, dry, or sensitive skin.
- Cream concealer – Available in a small pot or palette, leaves a satin or cream finish on skin. Has a thick texture with opaque pigment. This type of concealer is similar to the stick concealer because it offers heavy coverage. However, you need to apply it with a brush because it can look heavy due to the intense pigmentation. Best suited for normal, dry, or sensitive skin. Also, an option for concealing birthmarks.
- Pencil concealer – Multipurpose, creamy concealer that can be used to precisely cover small blemishes and dark spots. Manufactured in cream or wax forms, this type of concealer can be used to cover up small blemishes. It may also be used to define the shape of the eyebrows or line the inner lash line to brighten the appearance of the eyes.
- Cream to powder concealer – Available in a powder compact/concealer. Apply with a sponge for a powdery, matte finish.

== Ingredients ==
These are some common ingredients found in all concealer products:

- Ricinus communis (castor) seed oil
- Dimethicone
- Glycerin
- Talc
- Hydrolyzed rice protein
- Glyceryl stearate
- Kaolin
- Mineral oil
- Hydrolyzed corn starch
- Fragrance
- Oleyl alcohol
- Sodium chloride
- Color additive
- Water

== See also ==
- Baking, a make-up technique
