= Eye shadow =

Make-up applied to the eyelids

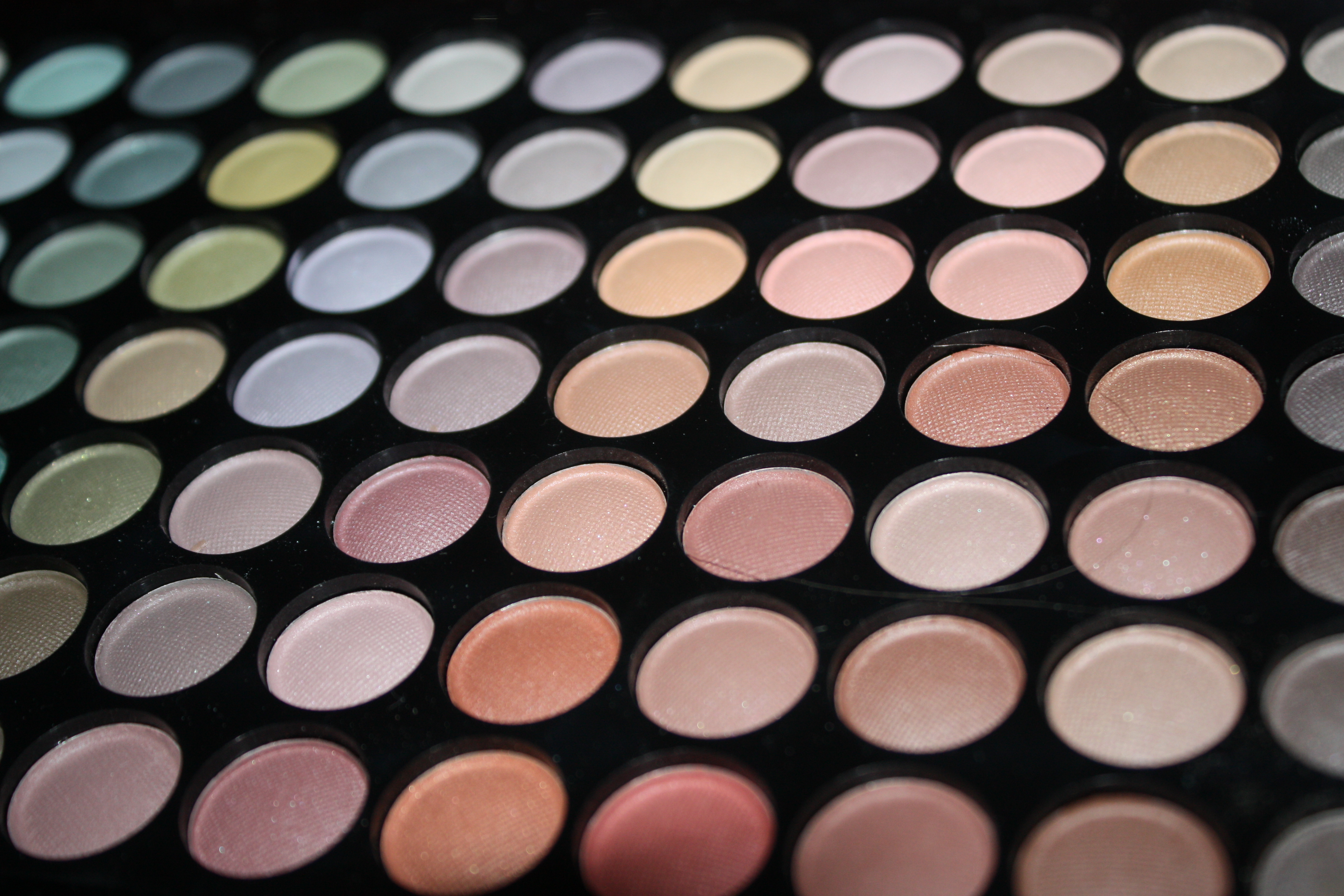
An eye shadow palette with a wide variety of neutral and vibrant colors

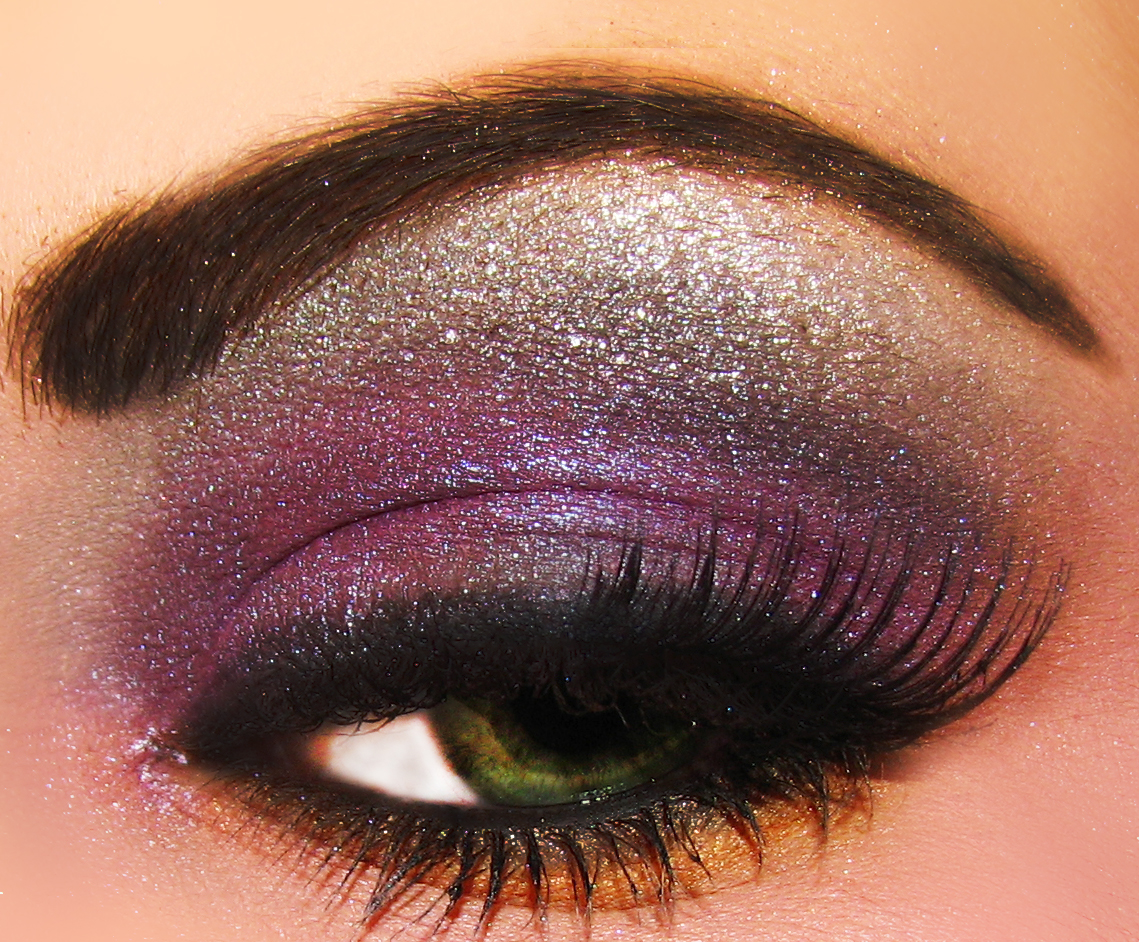
A mainly purple eye shadow look, with a brown shade blended in on the top.

Eye shadow (or eyeshadow) is a cosmetic applied primarily to the eyelids to attract attention to the wearer's eyes, making them stand out or look more attractive. Eye shadow can also be applied under the eyes, on the cheeks, or to brow bones.

Civilizations around the world use and have used eye shadow across genders. In ancient Egypt, it was customarily used by both men and women. Kohl, an ancient eye cosmetic, played a prominent role in various cultures and religious practices.

The use of eye shadow attempts to replicate the natural eyelid coloration that some women exhibit due to a natural contrasting pigmentation on their eyelids. Natural eye shadow can range from a glossy shine on one's eyelids to a pinkish tone or even a silver look.

== Use ==
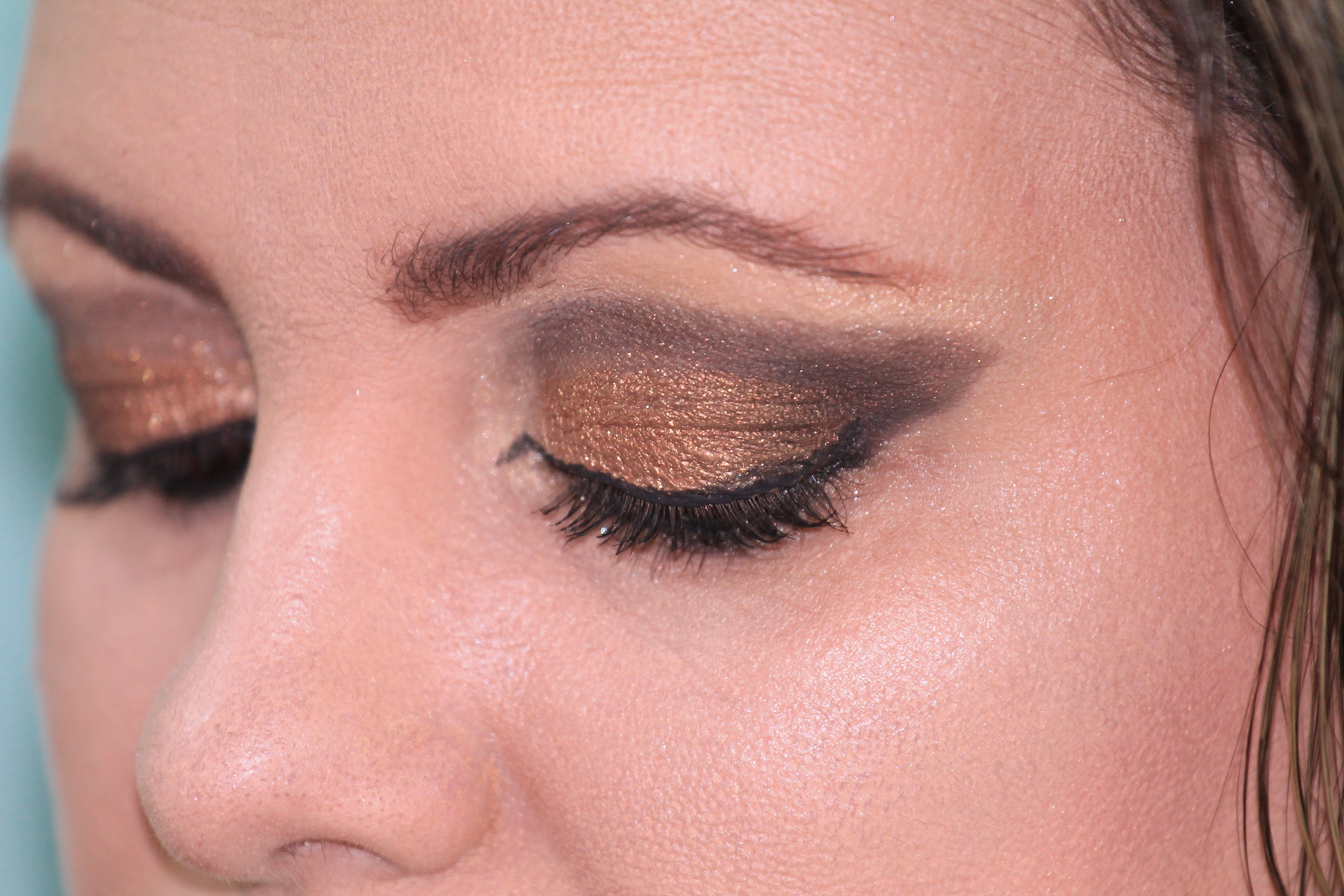
Eyes with heavy gold eye shadow

Video demonstrating application of eye shadow.

Eye shadow can add depth and dimension to one's eyes, complement one's eye color, make one's eyes appear larger, or simply draw attention to the eyes. Eye shadow comes in many different colors and textures. It is usually made from a powder but can also be found in liquid, pencil, cream, or mousse form. Eye shadow can be applied in many ways depending upon the desired look and the formulation. Typically, application is done using fingers or brushes. The most important aspect of applying eye shadow, and makeup in general, is blending well.

To remove eye shadow, a commercial makeup remover can be utilized, though a rich face wash will usually remove all traces of color. Generally, it is easy to remove, and simple water and soap can be used. Eye shadow, eyeliner, and mascara may also be removed using baby oil. There are also makeup wipes that can be used.

== History ==
Humans have used cosmetics for thousands of years. The earliest direct archeological evidence for eye makeup dates back to predynastic Egypt (c. 5000 – 4000 BCE). Traces of eye paints, most commonly malachite, a green mineral, and galena, a black mineral, as well as cosmetic palettes, pots and applicators have been found in burials from this period.

Over the years, many women have used burnt matches to intensify their eye makeup. Women would often dust rice powder on their faces to hide any imperfections or freckles. Eyeshadow or eye paint was very popular during the Victorian era (c. 1837 to c. 1901); less was more. The less eyeshadow one wore, the more respected one was.

== Modern usage ==
The earliest evidence of a commercial product called 'eye shadow' dates back to the 1910s in the United States. Cosmetics company founder Elizabeth Arden visited beauty salons in Paris in 1912, studying the products and techniques. In 1914 she introduced eye shadow to her own salons in the US. Eye shadow was advertised 'Arden Eye Shadow' in newspapers as part of the Arden Venetian Preparations range of cosmetics in 1919. The product was sold as 'Eye Sha Do' in 1922, but by the 1930s, eye shadow had become the common name used by Elizabeth Arden, Inc. and other cosmetic companies such as Helena Rubinstein Incorporated and Max Factor.

Eye shadow has gone through many different phases, for example, during the 1920s when smoky eyes were in trend or in the 1930s when people added many colors to their eyeshadow looks. Eye shadows of other finishes are sometimes on trend too, which include iridescent eye shadow and duo chrome eye shadow.

== Ingredients ==
Eye shadows typically consist of four types of ingredients: base fillers, binders, slip, and preservatives. In order to make eye shadow, there must be a balance between the fillers and binders.

Base fillers are usually minerals such as mica, talc or kaolin clay, which add bulk and texture to eye shadow. They make up about 30% of eye shadow powders and 25% of cream eye shadows. Mica absorbs moisture, gives the eye shadow shine and luster, and makes it opaque. Mica powders, iron oxides and clays can give color pigments to eye shadows.

Binders help eye shadow adhere and stay attached to the skin. Eye shadows can have dry or liquid binders. Zinc and magnesium, which are both white powders, are commonly used as dry binders. Zinc also adds color and can be used to increase the thickness of the eyeshadow. Silicone, paraffin wax, mineral oil or vegetable oils may be used as liquid binders.

Slip allows eye shadow to glide across the skin smoothly. Products may use silica or nylon, which are fine, colorless powders. Other types of slip include dimethicone, boron nitride or bismuth oxychloride.

Preservatives help products stay bacteria-free and extend their lifespan. Common preservatives in eye shadow are glycol and tocopherol.

== Application ==
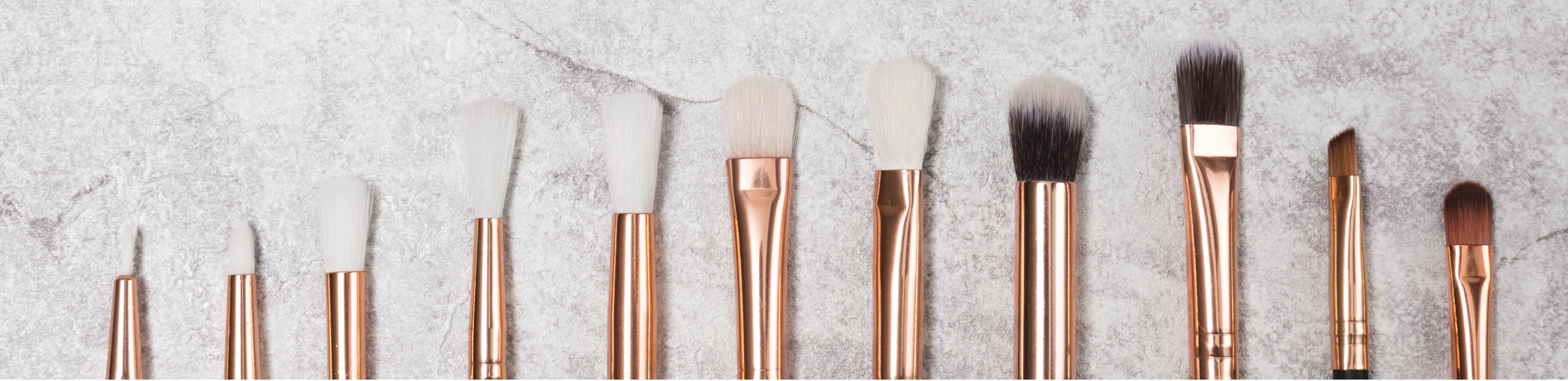
Variety of eye shadow brushes. Different shapes and density for different types of application.

Eye shadow is usually applied with brushes, sponges or fingers. Different brushes can be used for different application techniques and effects, such as packing on eye shadow, blending, smudging or smoking out eye shadow, or applying color with precision or applying color below the eye.

Flat brushes are typically used to pack eye shadow onto eyelids, while brushes with fluffy, tapered tips are used for blending eye shadows. Smaller brushes with dense or angled bristles are useful for precision work.

== See also ==
- Periorbital hyperpigmentation
