= Foundation (cosmetics) =

Skin coloured cosmetic applied to the face

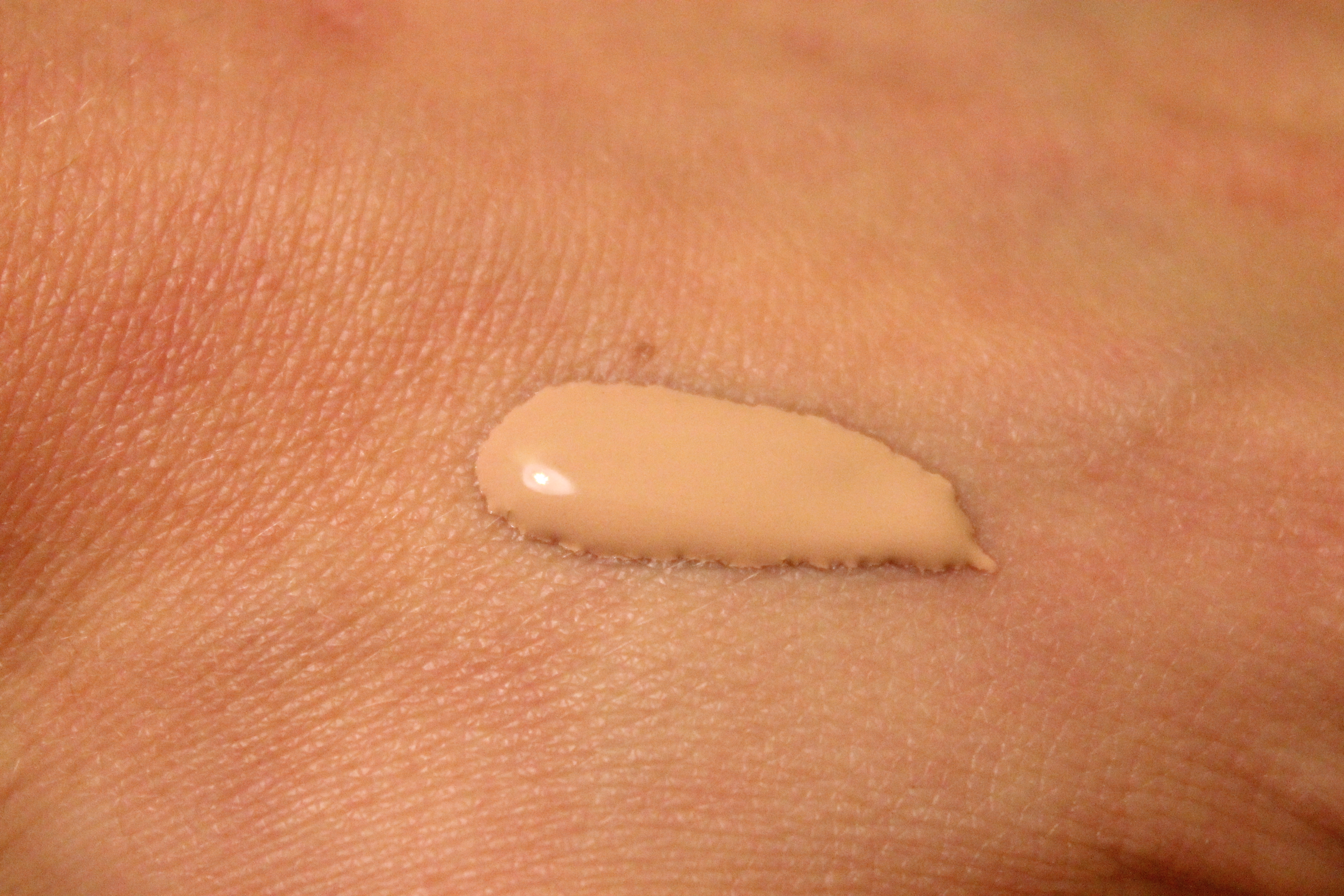
Thick, unblended foundation on skin

Foundation is a liquid, cream, or powder cosmetic applied to the face and neck to create an even, uniform color to the complexion, typically to cover flaws and change the natural skin tone. Foundation applied to the body is referred to as "body painting" or "body makeup".

== History ==
The use of cosmetics to enhance complexion reaches back into antiquity. "Face painting" is mentioned in the Old Testament (Ezekiel 23:40). Ancient Egyptians used foundation. In 200 BC, ancient Greek women applied white lead powder and chalk to lighten their skin. It was considered fashionable for Greek women to have a pale complexion. Roman women also favoured a pale complexion. Wealthy Romans favoured white lead paste, which could lead to disfigurement and death. Men also wore makeup to lighten their skin tone, using white lead powder, chalk, and creams. The cream was made from animal fat, starch, and tin oxide. The fat was rendered from animal carcasses and heated to remove the color. Tin oxide was made out of heating tin metal in the open air. The animal fat provided a smooth texture, while the tin oxide provided color to the cream.

Throughout the Middle Ages in Europe, it was considered fashionable for women to have pale skin, due to the association of tanned skin with outdoors work, and therefore the association of pale skin with affluence. In the 6th century, women would often bleed themselves to achieve a pale complexion. During the Italian Renaissance, many women applied water-soluble lead paint to their faces. Throughout the 17th century and the Elizabethan era, women wore ceruse, a lethal mixture of vinegar and white lead. They also applied egg whites to their faces to create a shiny complexion. Many men and women died from wearing lead-based make-up.

In the 18th century, Louis XV made it fashionable for men to wear lead-based makeup. Theatrical actors wore heavy white base.

In the late 18th and early 19th centuries, Victorian women wore little or no makeup. Queen Victoria abhorred make-up and deemed that it was only appropriate for prostitutes and loose women to wear it. It was only acceptable for actors or actresses to wear make-up. In the late 19th century, women would apply a whitening mixture made out of zinc oxide, mercury, lead, nitrate of silver, and acids. Some women stayed out of the sun, ate chalk, and drank iodine to achieve whiteness.

In the Edwardian era, women wore a base and did not bleach their skin as much as they did in previous centuries.

Modern foundation can trace its roots to Carl Baudin of the Leipziger Stadt theatre in Germany. He is the inventor of greasepaint. He wanted to conceal the joint between his wig and forehead, so he developed a flesh-coloured paste made of zinc white, ochre, and vermillion in lard. This formulation was so popular with other actors that Baudin began producing it commercially, and, as such, gave birth to the first theatrical makeup.

This would be the standard for theatrical makeup until 1914 when makeup artist Max Factor created Flexible Greasepaint that was more reflective of the lighting on movie sets. Although make-up would evolve dramatically from Baudin's invention, theatrical make-up is, to this day, not too far removed from the original blend of fats and pigment.

=== Pan-Cake ===
The first commercially available foundation was Max Factor's Pan-Cake. Originally, it was developed for use in film. Actresses were so taken with the results that Max Factor was overwhelmed with demand for the product for their personal use. The breakthrough in his formula was the first "foundation and powder in one"; traditionally, an actor was made up with an oil/emollient-based make-up, which was then set with powder to reduce the reflection and ensure it would not fade or smudge. Pan-Cake used talc—rather than oil or wax—as the base, and, applied directly to the skin with a wet sponge, it offered enough coverage (it could be layered without caking on the skin) to eliminate the need for a foundation underneath. This was considered significantly more lightweight and natural-looking on the skin than the standard method, hence people's eagerness to wear the item in public. Although foundation make-up was widely available and used within the film industry, the use of cosmetics, in general, was still somewhat disreputable, and no one had tried to market foundation (although lipstick, blush and nail polish were popular for daily use) as an everyday item. Factor had the product patented in 1937, and, despite the economic turmoil of the era, Pan-Cake became one of the most successful cosmetic launches of all time. By 1940, it was estimated that one in three North American women owned and wore Pan-Cake. As of February 2009, Procter and Gamble, the brand's current owner, confirmed that the original formula that Factor developed and used himself is still sold today.

== Modern formulations ==
=== Color ===
Color may be identified by a name, number, letter, or any combination of the three. However, unlike the Pantone or Munsell systems used in the art and fashion industries, commercial cosmetic product names are not standardized. If a make-up artist requests a "Medium Beige" foundation, the result can vary drastically from brand to brand and sometimes, within one brand across different formulas. Cosmetic companies can also edit and adjust their formulations at any time, resulting in the 'Medium Beige' foundation a consumer has been wearing for years becoming a slightly different shade or colour without prior notice.

==== Color classification ====
Cosmetic companies classify their foundations on two spectrums, over-tone and undertone. Undertones include Warm, Neutral, Olive, or Cool. A handful of professional lines, such as William Tuttle, Ben Nye, Visiora, M.A.C., and even Max Factor, do the opposite, naming their shades based on 'cancelling out' the wearer's natural skin tone so they do not become excessively warm/cool-toned in the applied areas. The difference in naming is not attributed to different definitions of warm and cool on the color wheel.

==== Selection ====
Most artists differ over the significance of selecting an exact match to the wearer's skin tone, intentionally using a mismatch can achieve the desired result. Skin that has red undertones, like rosacea, can be minimized by using a neutral (meaning neither yellow nor pink), beige-toned foundation. A sallow or pallid complexion can be brightened with a rose to red tint, mature skin that has lost its color and appears pale and dull can be brightened with a tint of clear pink, and olive or "ashy" skin can be brightened with a shot of peach. A crucial point in selecting a foundation shade is to recognize that the appearance of the shade in the container may not accurately gauge the colour impact on the skin – a foundation that appears very yellow in the bottle may apply much less yellow or not appear yellow at all. Trying the color on in stores like Ulta or Sephora is usually the best way to find an accurate match.

==== Shade range ====
An issue that can arise when searching for a foundation shade is an inability to find a shade that suits the wearer. This may be because the prospective user cannot tell the undertone of their skin, but it can also be from available products not being light or dark enough to properly match the user's skin tone. Some examples of brands that have wide shade ranges are: Fenty Beauty, Haus Labs By Lady Gaga, Bobbi Brown, Hourglass, Maybelline, Nars, and Makeup Forever. When switching from brand to brand, consumers must be mindful of similar shade names for different colors, since the cosmetic industry does not use the Munsell color system. It has been noted that cosmetics brands like Tarte, Beauty Blender, Yves Saint Laurent, and It Cosmetics have limited shade ranges – often making it difficult for individuals with dark skin tones to find a proper match. Lady Gaga's Haus Labs announced foundation line with 51 shades, making it the beauty brand with the most number of shades as of 2023. The use of color corrector products can also help to reduce discoloration.

=== Coverage ===
Coverage refers to the opacity of the makeup, or how much it will conceal on the skin.

- Sheer is the most transparent and contains the least amount of pigment. It will not hide discolorations on the skin, but it can minimize the contrast between the discoloration and the rest of the skin tone. Although pigment technology has evolved dramatically since 2004, the traditional protocol for sheer foundations called for the pigment to comprise 8–13% of the finished formula.
- Light can cover unevenness and slight blotchiness but is not opaque enough to cover freckles. It contains 13–18% pigment.
- Medium coverage can, when set with a tinted (instead of translucent) powder, cover freckles, discolorations, blotchiness, and red marks left by pimples. It contains 18–23% pigment.
- Full coverage is very opaque and used to cover birthmarks, vitiligo, hyperpigmentation, and scars. It is sometimes referred to as "corrective" or "camouflage" make-up. In general, it contains up to 35% pigment, though professional brands designed for use on stage can contain up to 50% pigment.

=== Application tools ===
There are various tools that can be used to apply foundation, including your fingers, a sponge, and several varieties of foundation brushes, each providing a different finish. Before applying foundation, always start with clean and moisturized skin. Dry and flaky skin patches will often be highlighted when base makeup is applied, so users should exfoliate their skin first if necessary.

- Fingers: Using fingers can be useful for creating a natural look. The natural body heat within our fingers helps the foundation to melt into the skin and makes it easy to blend in a sheer layer of makeup. However, using fingers is not recommended for applying full-coverage foundation as it will create a streaky and uneven appearance.
- Sponge: Using a sponge to apply foundation is best for creating a look with sheer to medium coverage. A triangular sponge is good for blending in liquid foundation and concealer, whilst a rounded sponge is best for powder foundations, though either can be used for these purposes. To use, wet a clean sponge with water first. The moisture will prevent the sponge from absorbing the makeup and will help to distribute the product more evenly over the skin- but make sure to squeeze out excess water. Sponges with pointed tips are best utilized for a seamless blending of the under-eye area, and wide, round sponges are best for blending foundation over large flat areas of skin like the cheeks or forehead. Also, note that reusing sponges can be unhygienic, so sponges should be washed and dried thoroughly after every use.
- Brush: For liquid foundation, a brush with a synthetic bristle is recommended as the brush will not soak up too much of the liquid. Alternatively, a natural bristle, which is more porous, works best for powder foundations and other powder face products. A densely bristled brush is best for applying foundation as it is less likely to leave streaky brush marks. As with all tools used to apply makeup to the face, brushes should be soft and gentle, as anything too stiff will scratch and irritate the skin.
- Airbrush: Liquid foundation is applied with an air stream. The airbrush mixes the foundation with a controllable stream of compressed air. It adheres to the skin as millions of tiny droplets of foundation. This technique can create an even, sheer appearance to the skin that, if applied properly, can appear natural and non-heavy or "cakey." Airbrush makeup application is also frequently used in special effects makeup. Note that if the liquid foundation is applied via airbrush too heavily, additional blending with a brush or sponge may be required.

=== Formulation ===
The formula refers to the ingredients blended together and how the makeup is formulated.

- Oil and emollient-based are the oldest types of make-up. An oil (usually mineral oil) or emollient (such as petrolatum, beeswax, or lanolin) is used as the main ingredient, with pigment added to it. The texture and application are extremely thick and dense, most closely resembling modern lip balms or lipsticks. The extremely emollient nature stays moist and will not cake, is moderately waterproof, and provides the most opaque coverage, but it can smudge, fade, and change colour (darkening or oxidising) during wear. Since the 1970s, synthetic wax has also been used, which is less greasy and more reliable than other emollients. Used professionally, it is sometimes referred to as Greasepaint. Examples: Pan-Stik (Max Factor's follow-up to his Pan-Cake make-up), Elizabeth Arden Sponge-On Cream, Mehron, Dermablend.
- Oil-based shakers are different from traditional oil-and-emollient-based makeup in that they were liquid foundations developed before emulsifiers and binding agent was available, and thus separate in the bottle, like the alcohol-based formulas mentioned below. Once shaken, this is akin to applying coloured oil to the skin, with a smooth texture that can provide medium coverage with a moist finish. Liquid foundation is applied using a damp makeup sponge and is especially effective around the eye. It was a marked improvement in application, stability, and finish over the traditional oil bases, but improvements since then have rendered these nearly extinct. Examples: Alexandra de Markoff Countess Isserlyn, Frances Denney Incandescent.
- Alcohol-based uses a blend of water and denatured alcohol as the base, with pigment added to it. Developed by Erno Laszlo for acne-prone skin, it eliminated emollient and binding agents that could clog pores and needs to be shaken before use. Alcohol-based foundations have the most lightweight, "nothing on my face" feel, and are nearly impossible to clog pores, but they provide only the sheerest coverage and can be tricky to apply and blend. They work better with cotton balls or pads, instead of latex or sea sponges. Examples: Erno Laszlo Normalizer Shake-It, Clinique Pore Minimizer.
- Powder-based began with Max Factor's Pan Cake, using powder – usually talc – as the main ingredient. The pigment is added, along with emollients, skin adhesion agents, and binding agents, to the formula before it is pressed into pans. The difference between this type of foundation and pressed powder is that this provides more coverage (due to more pigment), and contains more skin adhesion agents (to help it stick to the skin – because the pressed powder is lighter weight, it requires less). Some formulas – such as Pan Cake – also contain wax, and can only be applied with a wet sponge; others, such as M.A.C. StudioFix, contain no emollient, and can only be used dry; the last group, such as Lançome Dual Finish, contain a smaller amount of oil and can be used either way. This provides a "finished" look and can blend from sheer to nearly full coverage, but it can look too floury and dry, especially around the eyes or on drier/mature skin. They can also flake and trickle down as they are applied and blended.
- Mineral makeup most commonly refers to a foundation in loose powder format. The most common minerals used as the base are mica, bismuth oxychloride, titanium dioxide, or zinc oxide. However, talc is also a mineral, so a talc-based powder could be considered a "mineral makeup"—although most mineral makeup sold makes a point of being talc-free. A "mineral make-up" may be all mineral, part mineral – or contain less than 1% mineral as part of the finished formula. Using this logic, practically all make-up could be considered mineral.
- Water-based makeup appeared after the end of World War II, with emulsifiers that could successfully keep a water-and-oil blended emulsion stable being the key to their development. This creamy liquid provided medium coverage with a far more natural feel and appearance than oil, powder, or emollient bases of the time, and has become popular with women since then. Examples include Cover Girl Clean Makeup, Estee Lauder Country Mist. Since then, variations on the formula have expanded the category significantly:
  - Water-based cream make-up has a rich, creamy texture that can be sheer to full coverage with a moist, satiny finish. It usually comes in a jar or tube and is much more comfortable and realistic-looking on the skin than the oil or emollient-based predecessors. Examples: Elizabeth Arden Hydro-Light, Guerlain Issima.
  - Water-based oil-free eliminates oil altogether but substitutes an emollient ester or fatty alcohol in the base, and adds a mattifying agent—usually clay—to dry to a flat, non-reflective ("matte") finish. Oil-free liquids are quite thick and heavy, and the earliest versions took time to pour out of the bottle. They provide solid medium coverage but dry quickly, and can thus set before the blending is complete. The result is streaking, which is then difficult to smooth out without starting over from scratch. The usual recommendation is to divide the face into quarter sections and to apply and blend the makeup over one section (rather than the entire face) at a time. Blending over moisturised skin with a wet sponge can also help compensate for the lack of slip. However, they will last a long time and resist smudging, even on very oily skin. Examples: Estee Lauder Fresh Air.
  - Water-based transfer-resistant follows the same formulation as oil-free but uses a film former or polymer instead of (or in addition to) the clay to achieve a matte finish that resists being rubbed off. Transfer-resistant make-up was launched in 1993 by Revlon-owned Ultima II with Lipsexxxy, the first lip colour that included film former to prevent rubbing off. By 1996, WonderWear foundation and Revlon Colorstay had been launched, using the same technology as the lipsticks. Transfer-resistant (sometimes called transfer-proof) makeup will last on very oily skin, skin that perspires heavily, or in humid climates longer than any other type of foundation, though it is even more difficult to apply than oil-free makeup. The thick texture dries almost instantly and requires a fair amount of experimentation to master. The most modern versions (such as Revlon Colorstay SoftFlex) have made marked improvements over predecessors in that regard.
- Silicone-based make-up uses a silicone—or a blend of water and silicone—as the main ingredient. The most typical silicones used are dimethicone, polysiloxane, and volatile silicones such as cyclomethicone and phenyl trimethicone. The silicone provides lubrication and viscosity (what some artists refer to as "slip") at a level equal to, or often even better than oil, allowing a product to apply and blend over the skin smoothly and evenly. Silicones have a lighter weight and are thus more comfortable on the skin, as well as resisting filling in lines or large pores on the face. Conventional silicones stay supple and smooth, even in dry climates, whereas volatile silicones last long enough to blend over the face, then evaporate (like alcohol), leaving little to no feel behind. Silicone-based makeups are less likely to oxidise or change colour during wear. One of the biggest challenges facing silicone bases is the tendency for the product to break and/or ball up on the skin, something unique to silicones and out of the control of the user. Ionizing the silicones (electrically charging the silicone positive) helps it adhere to (negatively charged) skin, although this technology is in its infancy and thus rather expensive. Examples: Maybelline Dream Matte Mousse.

== Safety ==
=== Per- and polyfluoroalkyl substances (PFAS) ===
A 2021 study tested 231 makeup and personal care products and found organic fluorine, an indicator of PFAS, in more than half of the samples. High levels of fluorine were most commonly identified in waterproof mascara (82% of brands tested), foundations (63%), and liquid lipstick (62%). As many as 13 types of individual PFAS compounds were found in each product. Since PFAS compounds are highly mobile, they are readily absorbed through human skin and through tear ducts, and such products on lips are often unwittingly ingested. Manufacturers often fail to label their products as containing PFAS, which makes it difficult for cosmetics consumers to avoid products containing PFAS.

== See also ==
- Face powder
- Blushing
- Concealer
