= Rouge (cosmetics) =

Cosmetic for reddening the lips and cheeks

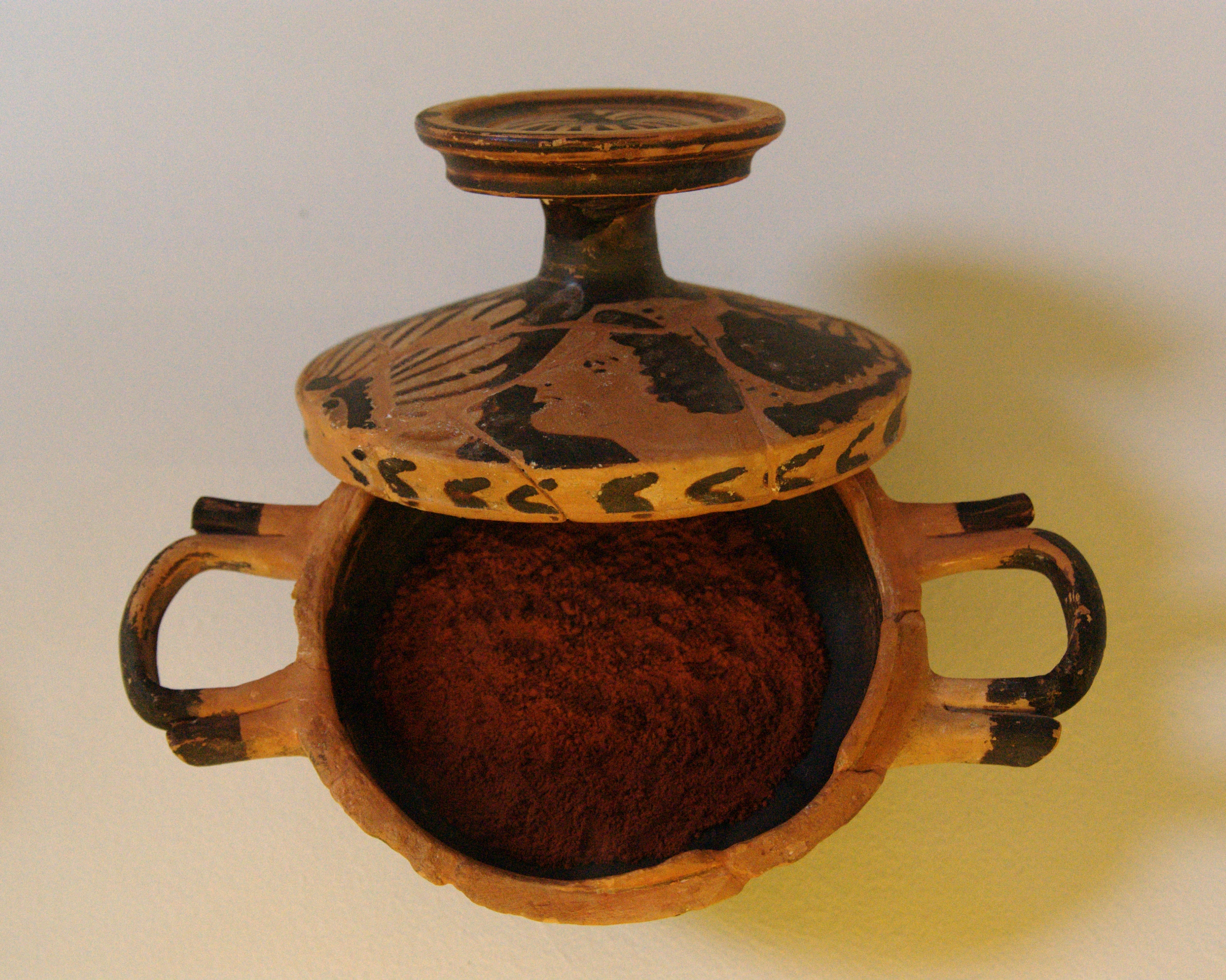
Ancient Egyptian rouge compact

Rouge (/ˈruːʒ/; meaning "red" in French), also called blush or blusher, is a cosmetic for coloring the cheeks in a variety of shades, or the lips red. It is applied as a powder, cream or liquid.

Each year, approximately US$25 billion is spent on buying rouge.

== History ==
The Ancient Egyptians were known for their creation of cosmetics, particularly their use of rouge. Ancient Egyptian pictographs show men and women wearing lip and cheek rouge. They blended fat with red ochre to create a stain that was red.

Greek men and women eventually mimicked the look, using crushed mulberries, red beet juice, crushed strawberries, or red amaranth to create a paste. Those who wore makeup were viewed as wealthy and it symbolized status because cosmetics were costly.

In China, rouge was used as early as the Shang Dynasty. It was made from the extracted juice of leaves from the Carthamus tinctorius plant. Some people added bovine pulp and pig pancreas to make the product denser. Women would wear the heavy rouge on their cheeks and lips. In Chinese culture, red symbolizes good luck and happiness to those who wear the color.

In Ancient Rome, men and women would create rouge using lead(II,IV) (red lead) and cinnabar. The mixture was found to have caused cancer, dementia, and eventually death. Other sources for rouge (raw materials) included malachite and antimony.

In the 16th century in Europe, women and men would use white powder to lighten their faces. Commonly women would add heavy rouge to their cheeks in addition.

Studies have strived to research other reasons as to why individuals choose to color their faces in a red tint and what blushing may also signify to others. Blushing, the body's natural reaction to feelings of shame/embarrassment/guilt is often followed with a reddish coloring on one's cheeks on individuals whose bodies react as such. This reaction can be associated with different moral and human tendencies such as pro sociality and commitment to social relationships. Emotions are involuntary and instantaneous reactions, and because of this are pretty reliable. Knowing this researchers have used social emotions to understand how humans signal prosocial intentions. Embarrassment which is often accompanied by the reddening of the face can now be seen as an indicator of one's prosocial behavior.

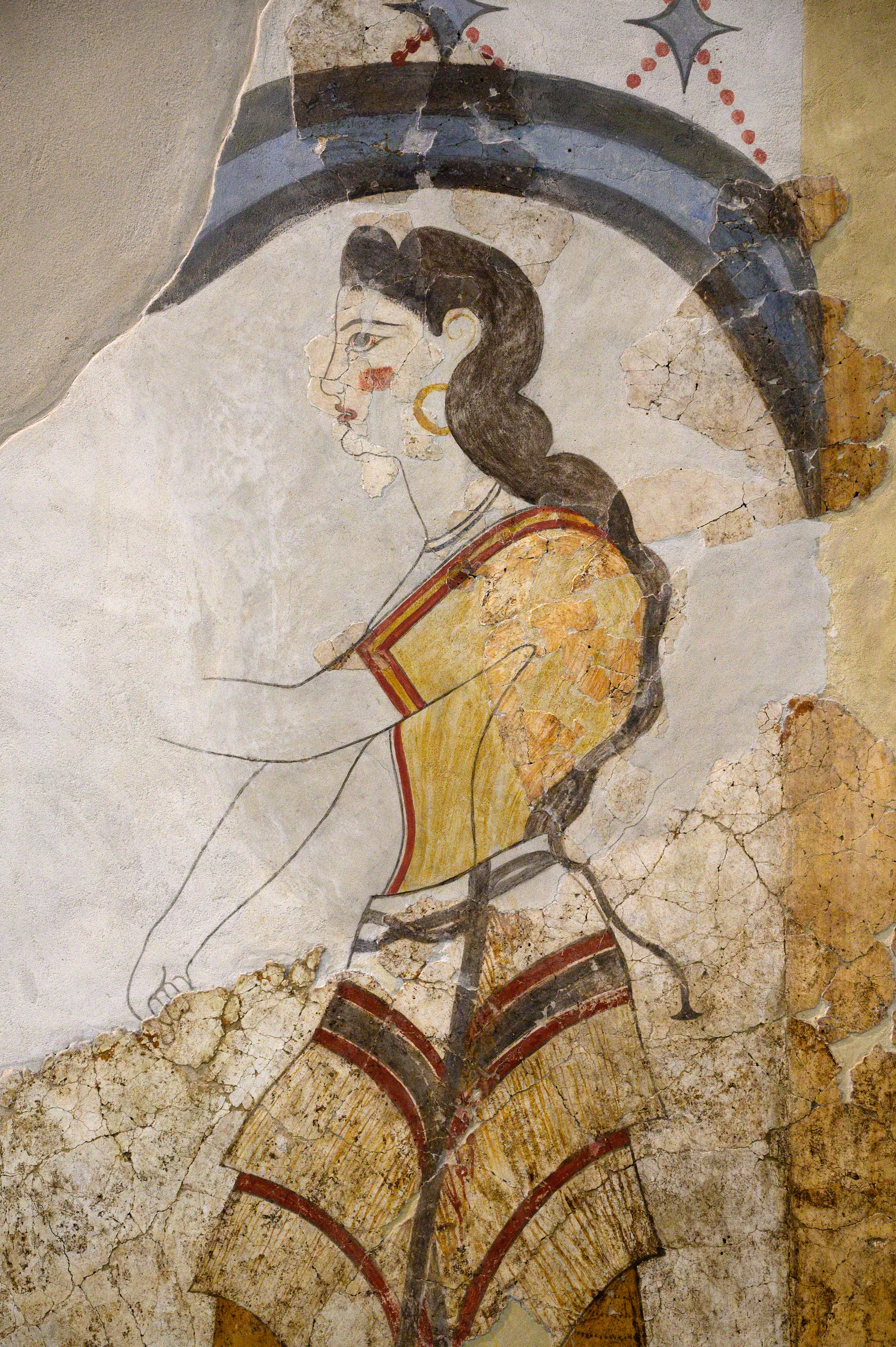
Wall painting form the House of the Ladies in Akrotiri on Thera (Santorini) from 1700-1600 BC showing rouge makeup

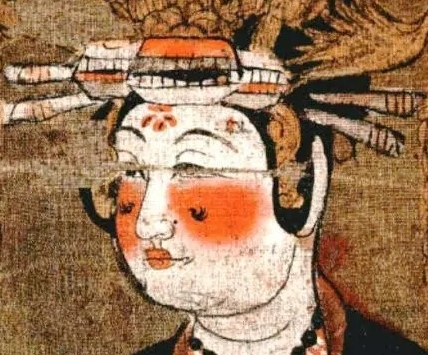
Illustration of woman wearing huadian on forehead and mianye, Five dynasties period, China (907-979)

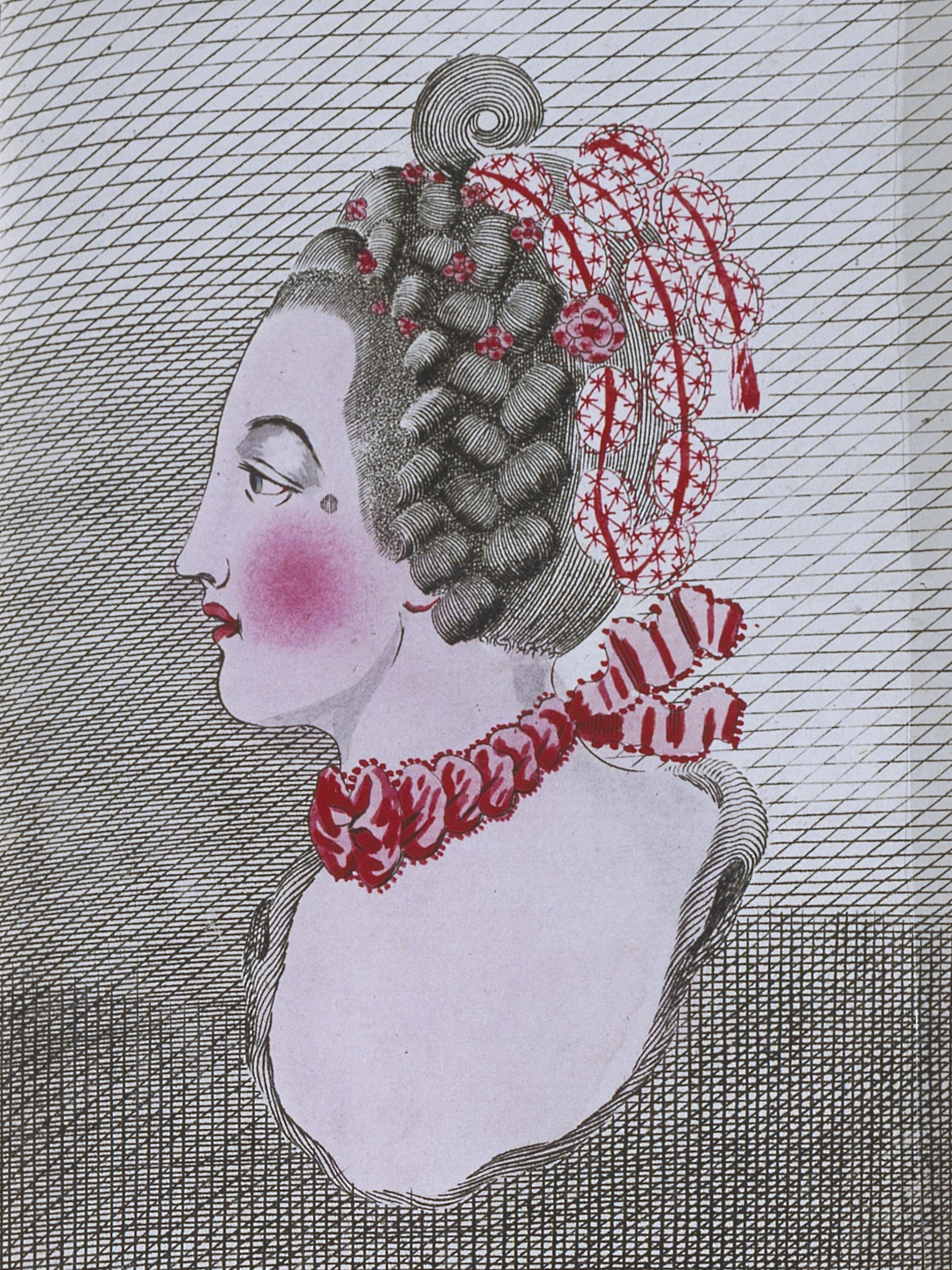
French illustration from 1768 showing rouge makeup

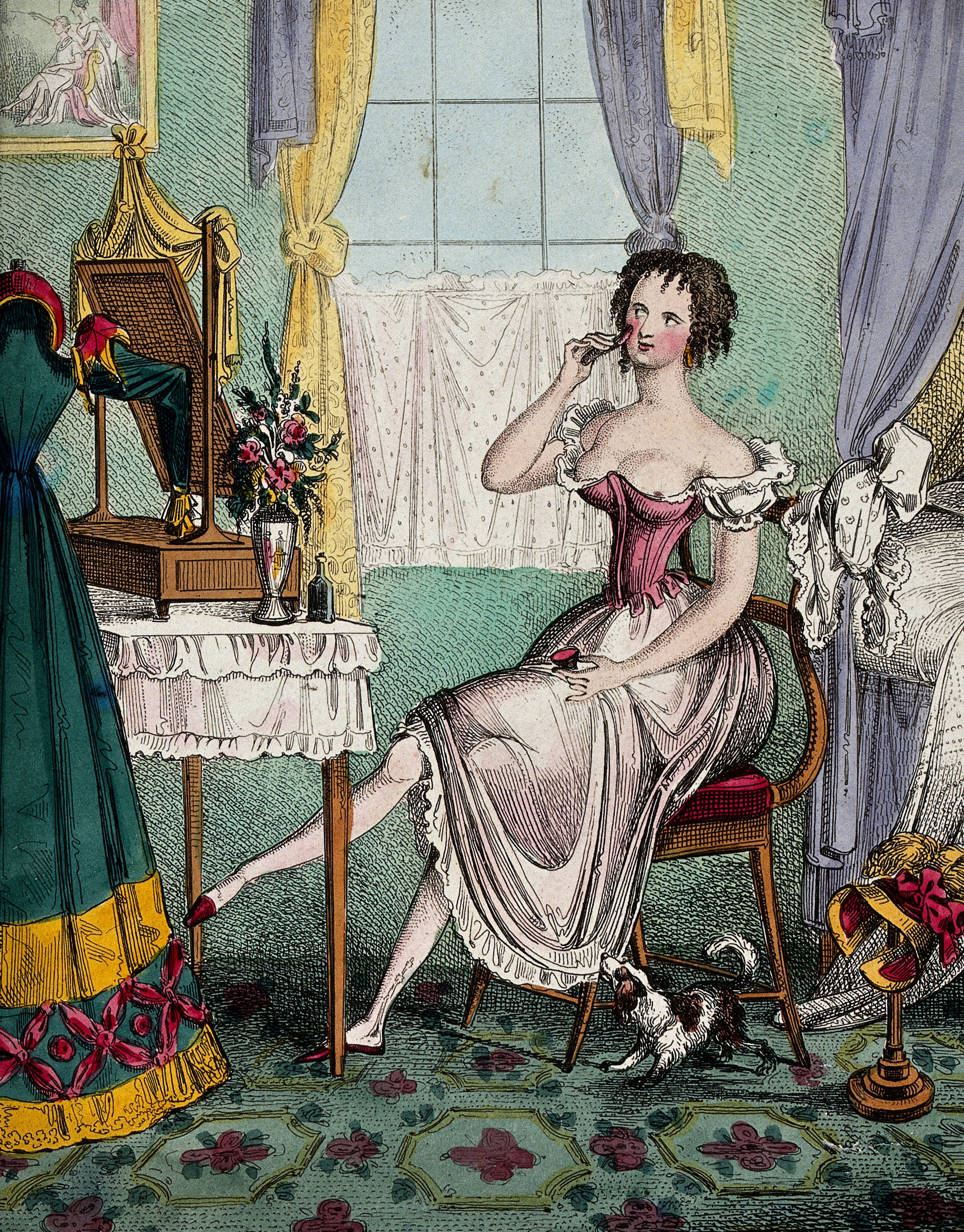
Satirical etching of a woman applying rouge, 1823

== Contemporary ==
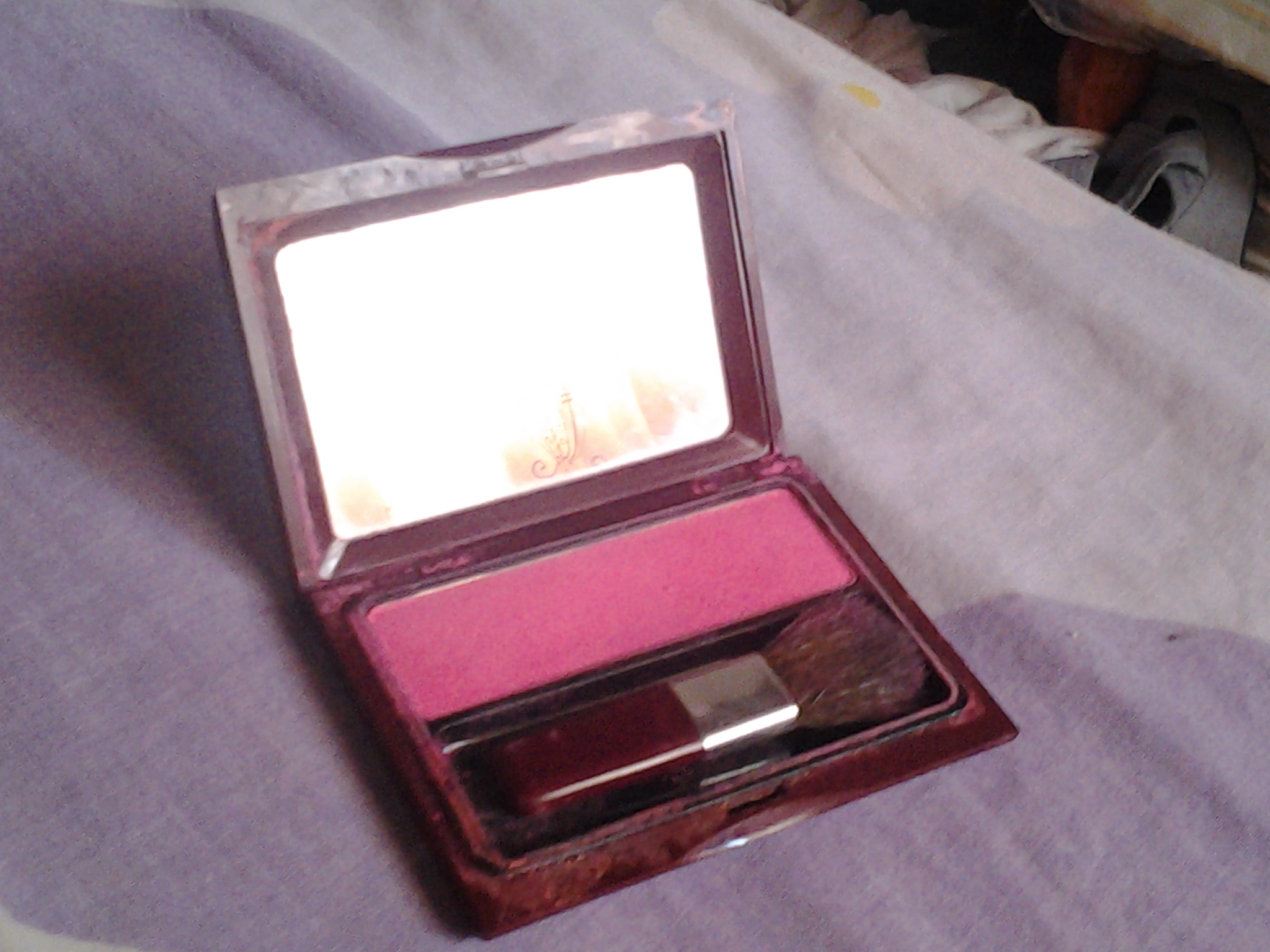
A rouge compact with a mirror and brush

Modern rouge generally consists of a red-colored talcum-based powder that is applied with a brush to the cheeks to accentuate the bone structure. The coloring is usually either the petals of safflower, or a solution of carmine in ammonium hydroxide and rosewater perfumed with rose oil. A cream-based variant of rouge is schnouda, a colorless mixture of Alloxan with cold cream, which also colors the skin red.

Today, rouge is a term used to primarily identify blush of any color, including: brown, pink, red, and orange. Modern blush is offered in both a pressed or loose powder, a cream consistency similar to lipstick, or a liquid form. It is not commonly used to identify lipstick; however, some may use the term to refer to the red color of the product.

When the fashion trend of matching lipsticks with nail polish took hold and the color range of lipstick increased, people no longer used the term to identify lip color. The shade range for blush generally remained limited, keeping the name rouge.

Blush is made in the form of a cream, liquid, powder, or gel.

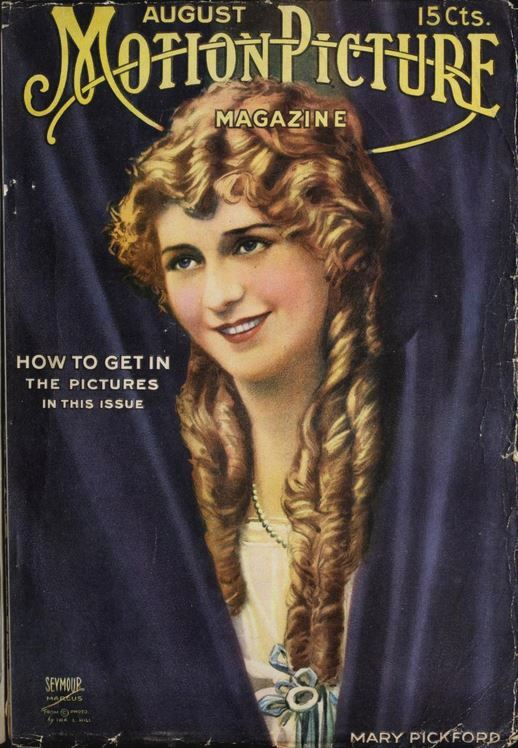
Mary Pickford illustrated on a magazine 1916 wearing blush

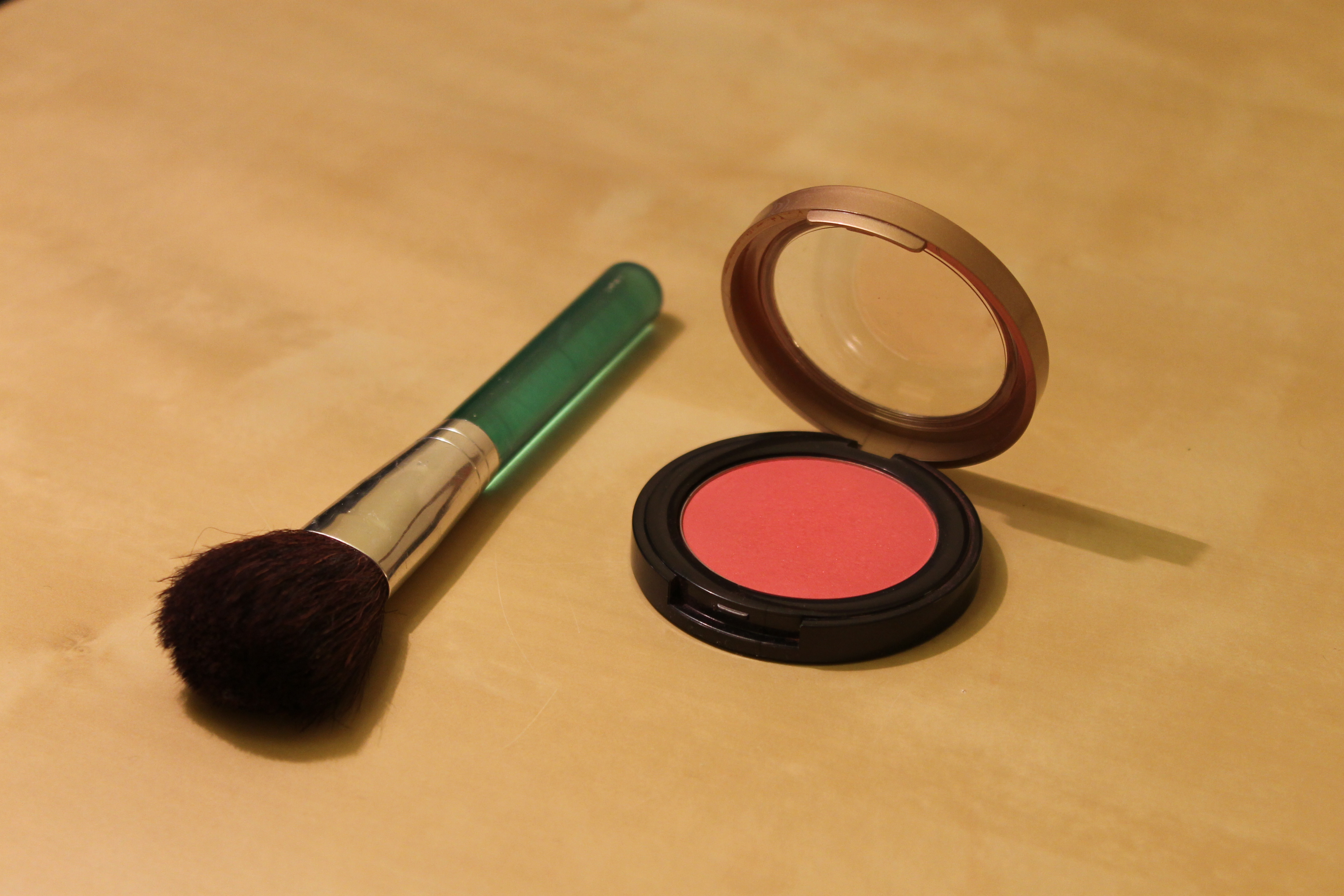
Contemporary blush compact and applicator brush

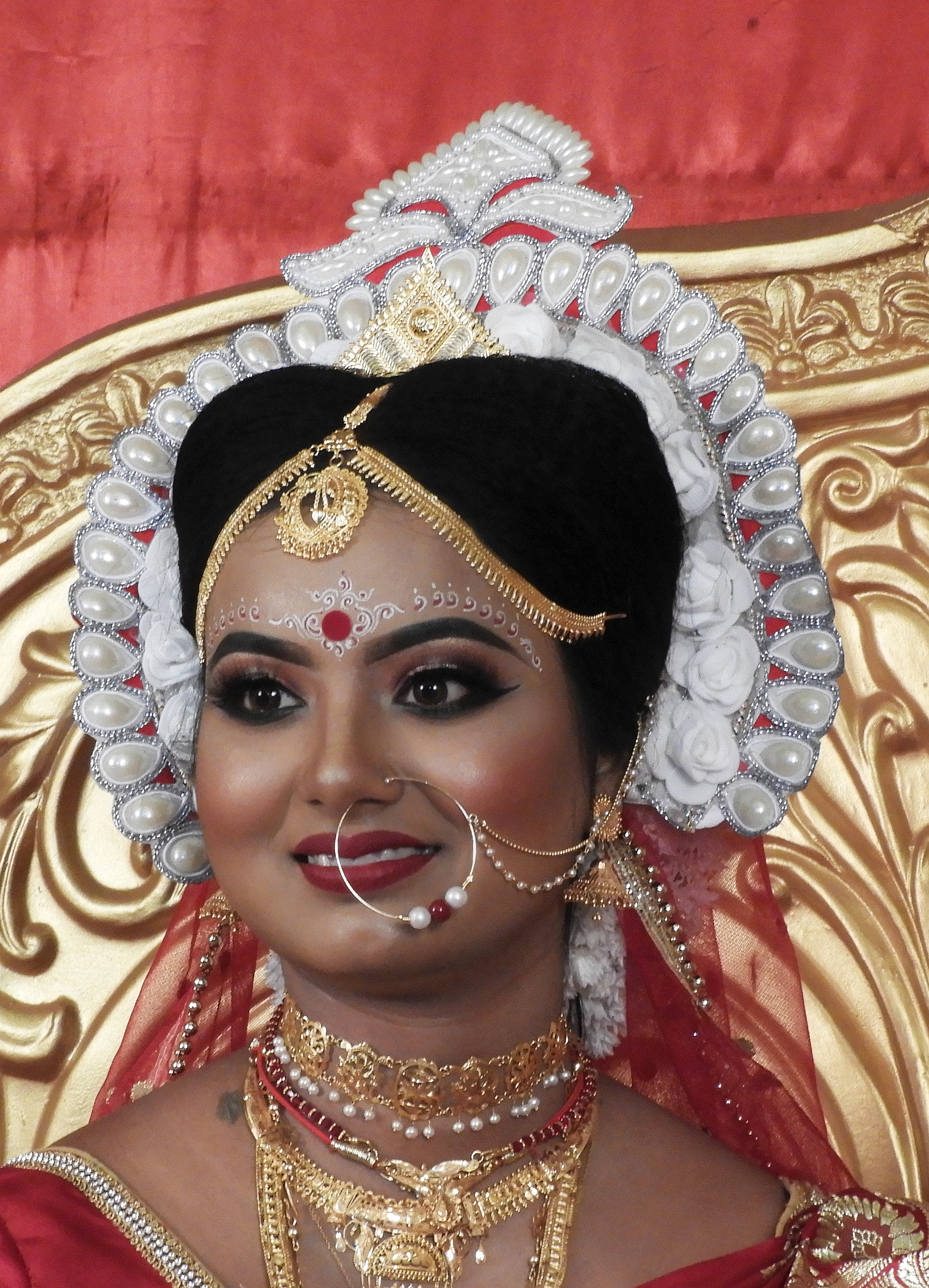
Bengali bride wearing rouge

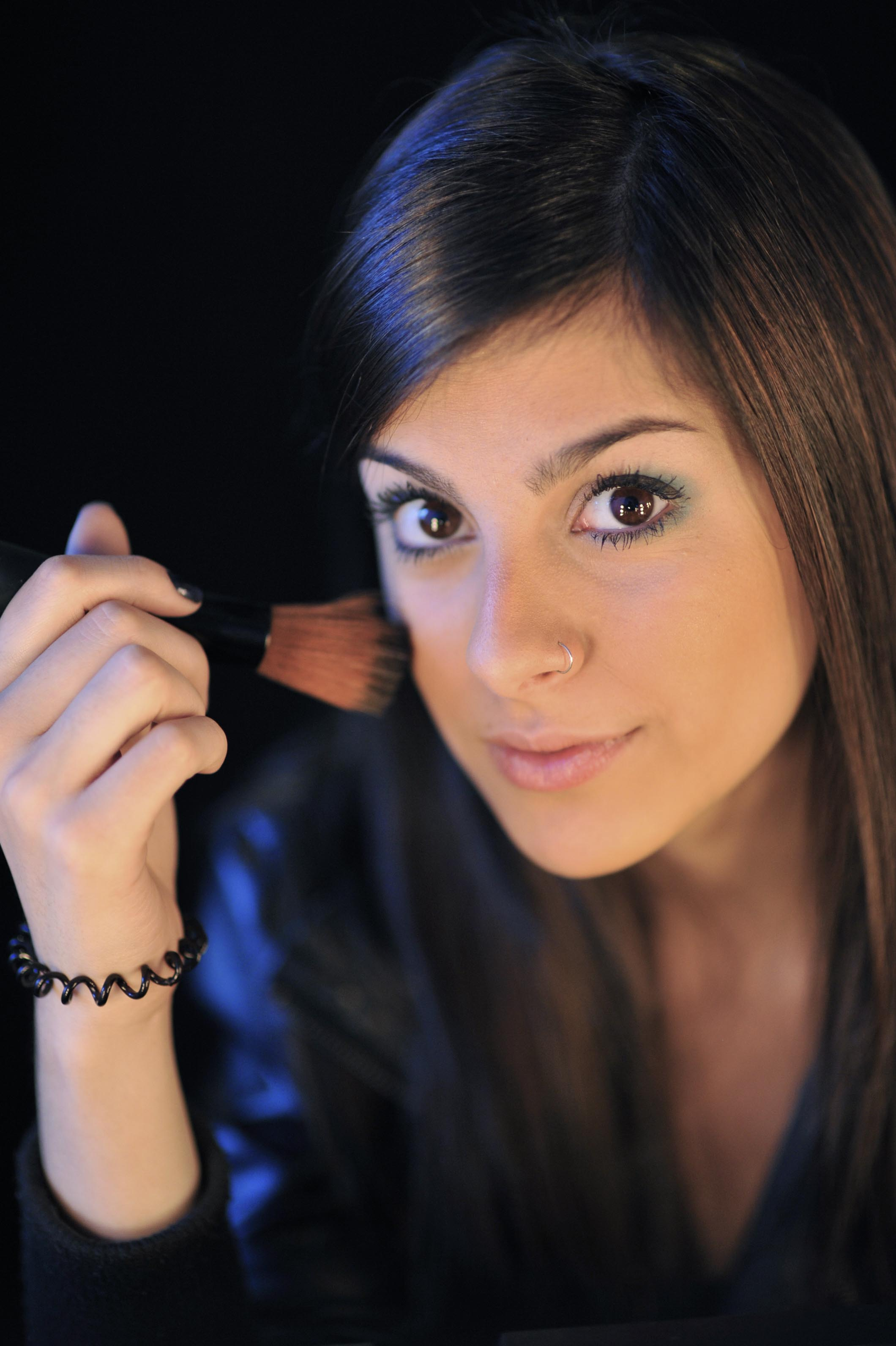
Applying rouge at São Paulo Fashion Week

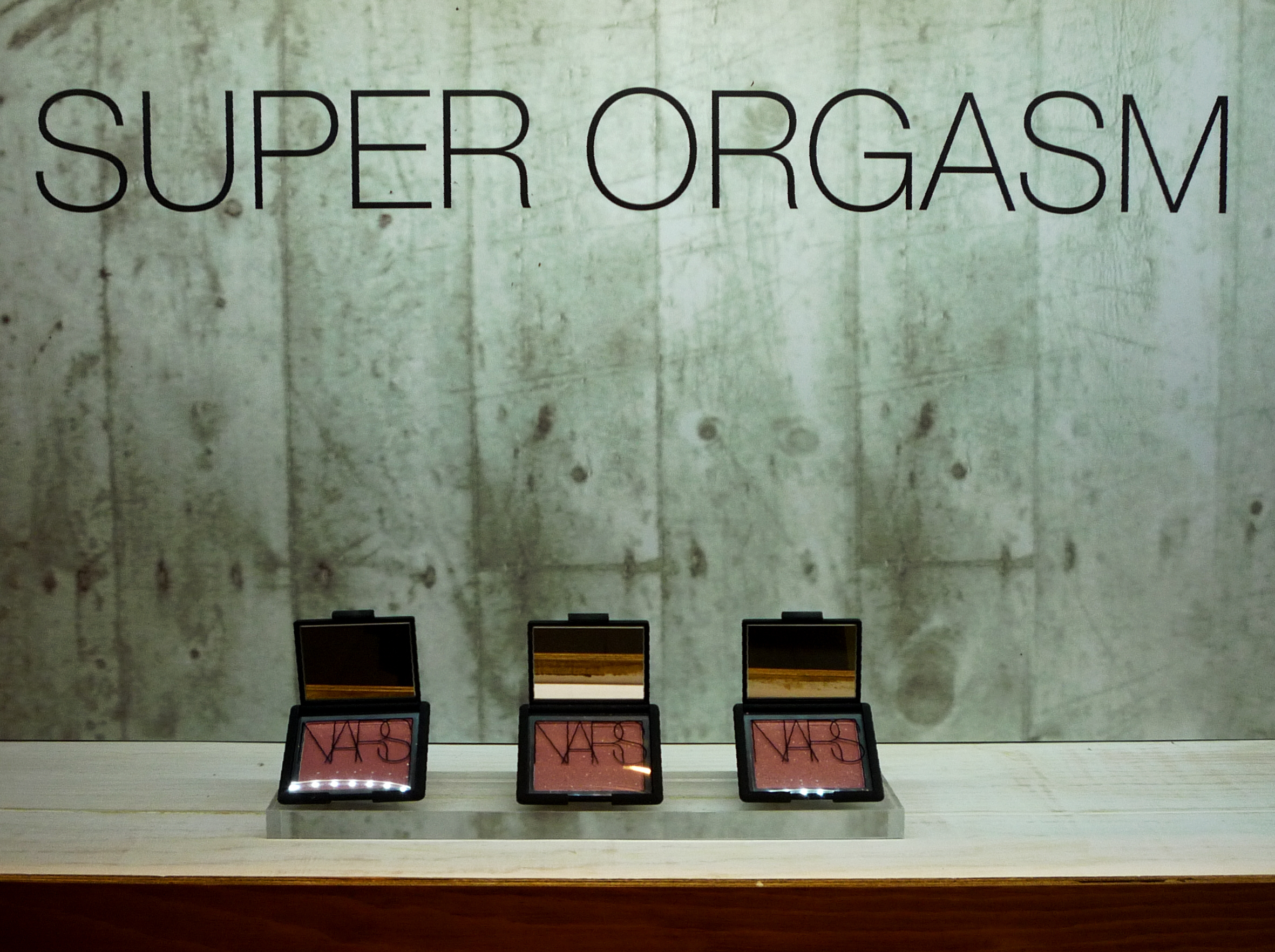
Powdered blush for sale in Oxford Street, London
