= History of cosmetics =

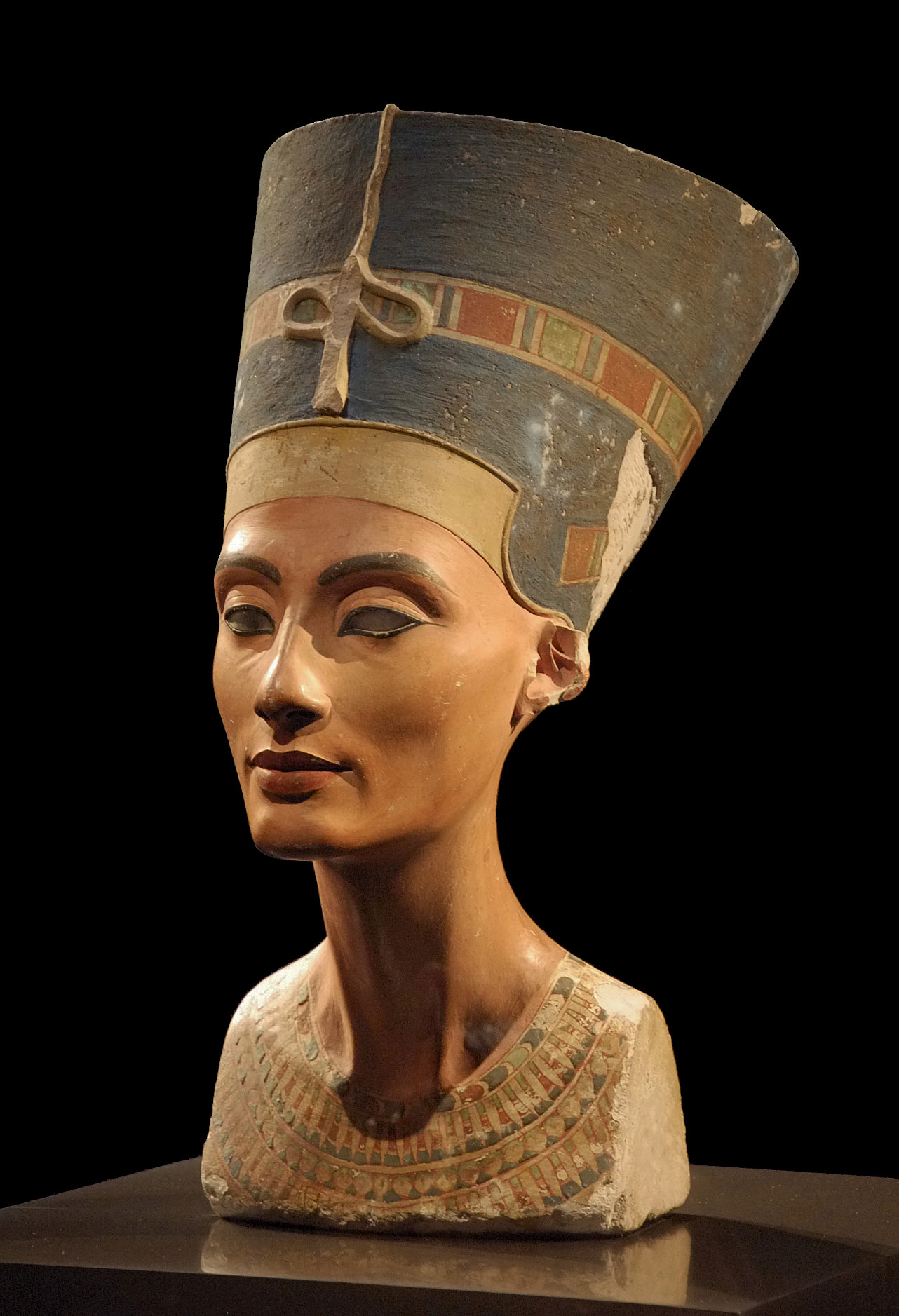
Nefertiti bust with eye liner applied ≈1,320 BC (≈3,300 years ago).

The history of cosmetics spans at least 7,000 years and is present in almost every society on earth. Cosmetic body art is argued to have been the earliest form of a ritual in human culture. The evidence for this comes in the form of utilised red mineral pigments (red ochre) including crayons associated with the emergence of Homo sapiens in Africa. Cosmetics are mentioned in the Old Testament—2 Kings 9:30 where Jezebel painted her eyelids—approximately 840 BC—and the book of Esther describes various beauty treatments as well.

Cosmetics were also used in ancient Rome, although much of Roman literature suggests that it was frowned upon. It is known that some women in ancient Rome invented make up including lead-based formulas, to whiten the skin, and kohl to line the eyes.

== Africa ==
=== Egypt ===
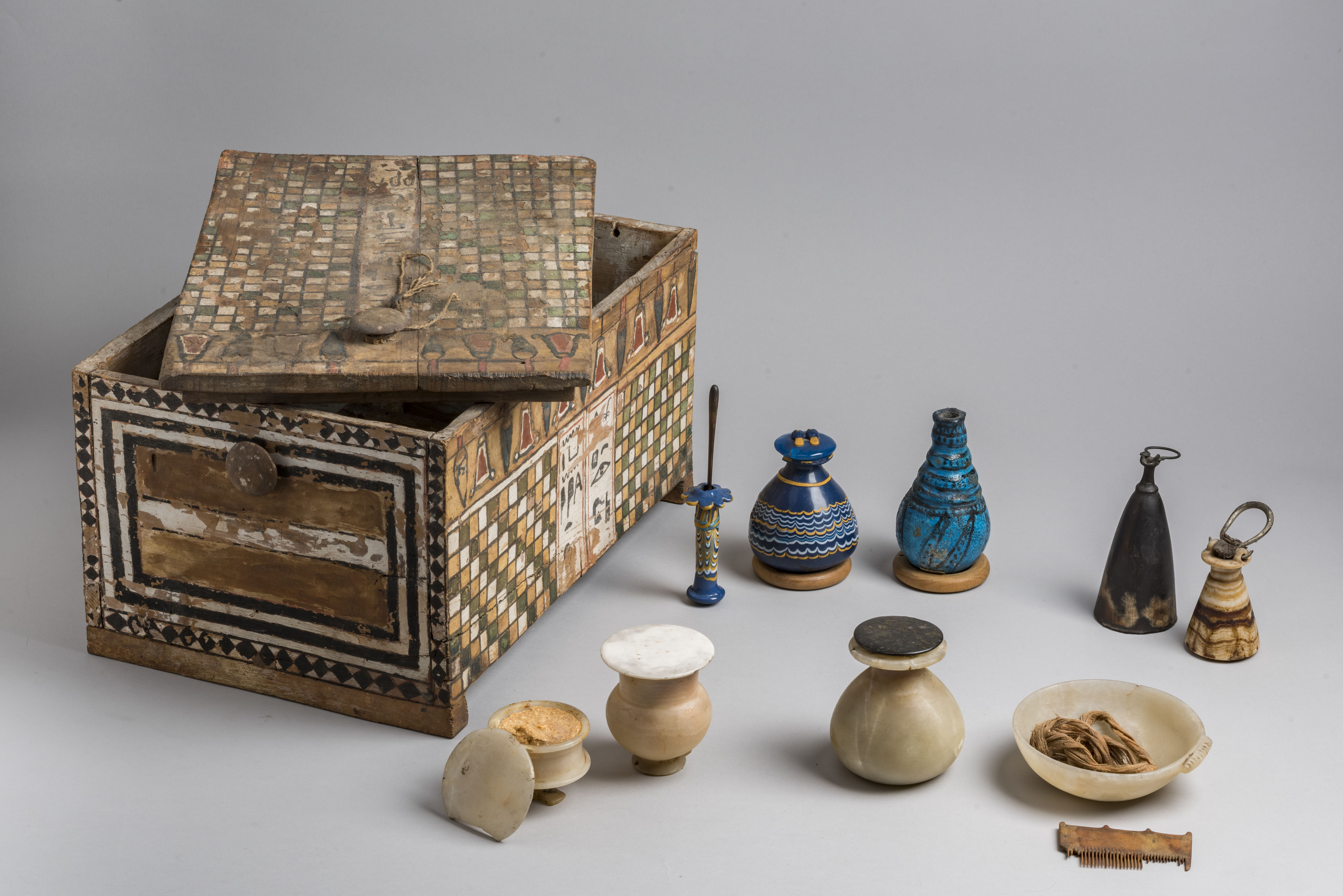
Ancient Egypt beauty box, with accessories including a kohl tube

One of the earliest cultures to use cosmetics was ancient Egypt, where both Egyptian men and women used makeup to enhance their appearance. The first cosmetics appeared 5,000 years ago in Egypt. To achieve a pleasant smell and softness of the skin, incense oils were used, and women applied white to protect their faces from the sun. The Egyptians were also the first to use black antimony-based paint as eyeliner. And to create a natural blush, they would crush flowers.

The use of cosmetics in Ancient Egypt is well documented. Kohl has its roots in north Africa. The use of black kohl eyeliner and eyeshadows in dark colours such as blue, red, and black was common, and was commonly recorded and represented in Egyptian art, as well as being seen in Egyptian hieroglyphs. Ancient Egyptians utilized stone pallets to combine the material used to create cosmetic products. Cosmetic pallets were shaped into hieroglyphs, the most frequent being fish. Ancient Egyptians also extracted cosmetic face paint from fucus-algin, 0.01% iodine, and bromine mannite, however the bromine-based makeup was severely toxic. Lipsticks with shimmering effects were initially made using a pearlescent substance found in fish scales, which are still used extensively today. Despite the hazardous nature of some Egyptian cosmetics, ancient Egyptian makeup was also thought to have antibacterial properties that helped prevent infections. Remedies to treat wrinkles contained ingredients such as gum of frankincense and fresh moringa. For scars and burns, a special ointment was made of red ochre, kohl, and sycamore juice. An alternative treatment was a poultice of carob grounds and honey, or an ointment made of knotgrass and powdered root of wormwood. To improve breath the ancient Egyptians chewed herbs or frankincense which is still in use today. Jars of what could be compared with setting lotion have been found to contain a mixture of beeswax and resin. These doubled as remedies for problems such as baldness and greying hair. They also used these products on their mummies, because they believed that it would make them irresistible in the after life.

=== Madagascar ===
Women of the Sakalava and Vezo peoples in Madagascar began wearing masonjoany, a decorative paste made from ground wood, in the 9th century C.E. It is worn on the face as sunscreen and insect repellent, as well as decoration, with women painting flowers, leaves and stars in white and yellow pastes. The practice is derived from cultural exchange between Malagasy people and Arab merchants in the Northwest coastal region of the island.

== Middle East ==
Cosmetics are mentioned in the Old Testament, such as in 2 Kings 9:30, where the biblical figure Jezebel painted her eyelids (approximately 840 BC). Cosmetics are also mentioned in the book of Esther, where beauty treatments are described.

Both sexes used cosmetics throughout the pre-Islamic Near East, going back to the civilizations of ancient Mesopotamia, Ancient Egypt, and Iran. Eye makeup in the form of kohl, were used in Persia and what today is Iran from ancient periods. Kohl is a black powder that was used widely across the Persian Empire. It was used as a powder or smeared to darken the edges of the eyelids similar to eyeliner. Cosmetics, especially kohl, played a significant role in the Middle East, highlighting not only its eye-protective aspects but also its cultural significance. The process of making kohl involved burning a substance to maintain a flame, a group of surfaces, and incorporating galena, a lead compound. Three items—jewelry, pottery, and seashells containing kohl—were buried with an ancient Emirati woman. Natural benefits of kohl also reduced eye swelling.

The Middle East's adherence to Islamic rules shapes various aspects of daily life, including cosmetics and was also used throughout the Middle East and Near East after the advent of Islam. A specific type of kohl known as Ithmid kohl has been used for over 15 centuries in the region. In comparison to other types, Ithmid kohl not only has cosmetic benefits but also promotes health without harmful substances. Women used cosmetics widely in the private sphere, while only female slaves and singers tended to use them in public. Ointments, powders, and pastes were used as skin-lightening agents to comply with the era's beauty standards. Perfumed creams were also used on the face, as were sandalwood-based pastes to protect the skin from sunlight. Decorative henna was used during wedding celebrations to beautify the bride. Men and children used kohl on their eyes and henna as a natural dye for their hair, but rarely used other cosmetic items.

=== Henna ===
Henna has a particular significance in Middle Eastern cosmetic techniques. It is used for both practical and ornamental purposes, especially at weddings, Eid, and Ramadan. The application method is combining dried henna powder with water, lemon juice, strong tea, and additional substances to make a paste. After that, the paste is applied to the skin in intricate patterns, frequently with the use of a brush or cone. A reddish-brown stain that might remain for several weeks is left behind when the dried paste peels off after a few hours. In Middle Eastern societies, this art form has been passed down through the years and is seen as a means of celebration and self-expression.

In addition to its ceremonial use, henna can be used as an alternative for hair and nail polish, particularly on special occasions. Beyond its artistic designs, henna is used in Muslim marriage rituals to paint certain patterns on the skin that are said to bring blessings, or barakah. Henna was also a helpful way to stay cool during the summer. The cultural and symbolic value of henna in the Middle East is enhanced by these designs. In the Middle East, older women typically apply henna as a cosmetic procedure to symbolize tradition, experience, and wisdom. By connecting generations, this tradition not only preserves cultural identity but also promotes intercultural understanding.

== Asia ==
In the Indus Valley Civilization (c. 2500 BCE), archaeological excavations at Mohenjo-daro and Harappa have revealed small cosmetic containers, applicators, and evidence of pigments used for personal adornment. Traditional Indian practices included the use of kajal (kohl) to darken the eyes, believed to be both aesthetic and protective against glare and the evil eye. The application of sindoor (vermillion) in the hair parting by married women, and the use of mehndi (henna) for body decoration, also trace back to ancient Indian customs and remain culturally significant today.

=== China ===
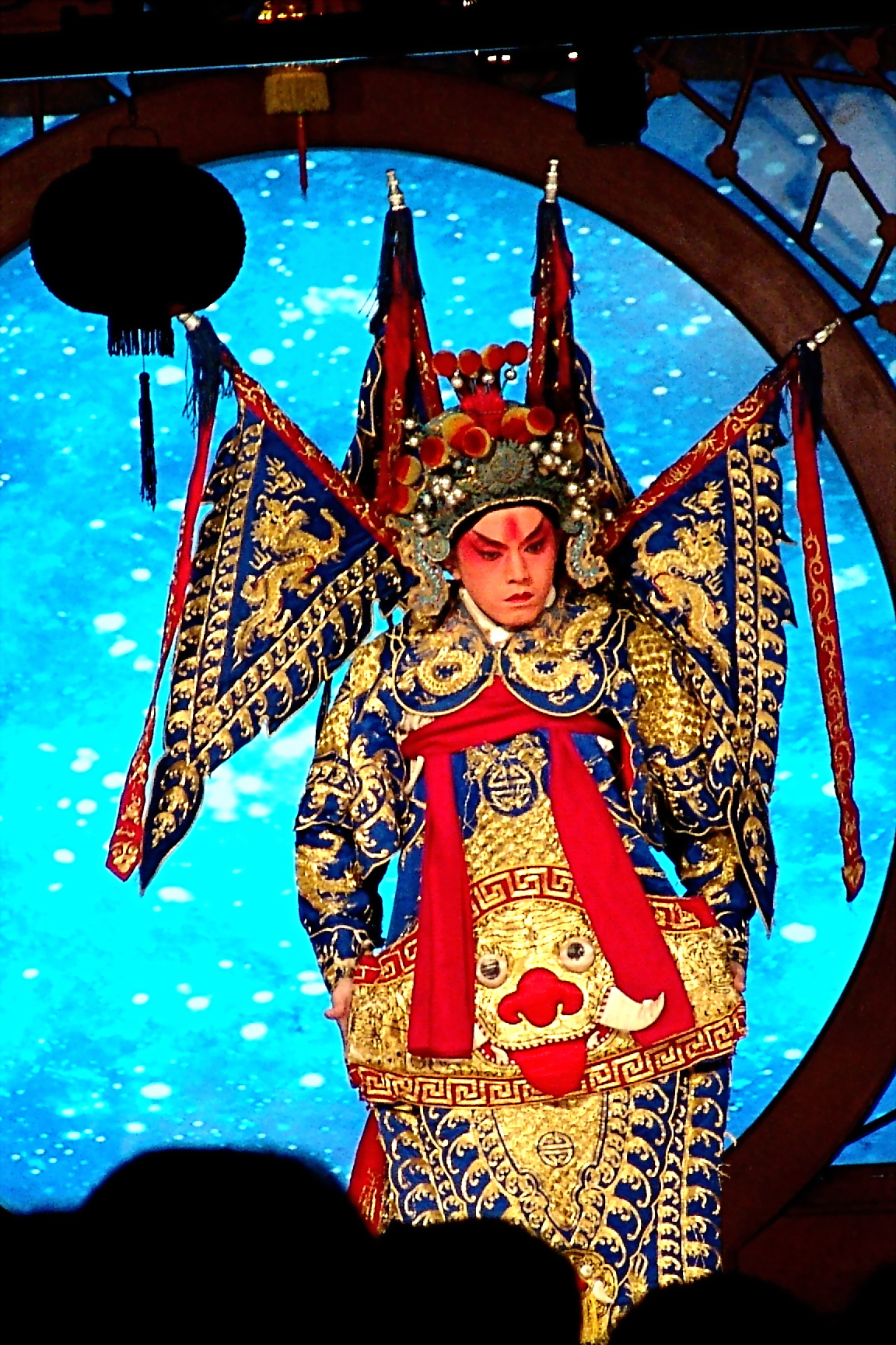
A Beijing opera performer with traditional stage make up.

Flowers play an important decorative role in China. Legend has it that once on the 7th day of the 1st lunar month, while Princess Shouyang, daughter of Emperor Wu of Liu Song, was resting under the eaves of Hanzhang Palace near the plum trees after wandering in the gardens, a plum blossom drifted down onto her fair face, leaving a floral imprint on her forehead that enhanced her beauty further. The court ladies were said to be so impressed, that they started decorating their own foreheads with a small delicate plum blossom design. This is also the mythical origin of the floral fashion, meihua zhuang (梅花妝, 'plum blossom makeup'), that originated in the Southern dynasties (420–589) and became popular amongst ladies in the Tang (618–907) and Song (960–1279) dynasties. The use of nail polish originated around 3000 BC in China, when the staining of nails was utilized by members of the upper class. Nail stains were produced from ingredients such as egg whites, beeswax, roses, and arabic gum. The colors used to stain nails became symbols of social class, as only the powerful could have red, gold, or silver stained nails. Nail cosmetics were reserved for the elite, and its use would be considered criminal for members of the lower class.

=== Mongolia ===
Women of royal families painted red spots on the center of their cheeks, right under their eyes. However, it is a mystery why. They said that red cheeks (face blush) are a sign of a happy queen. Blush helps to enhance the face shape to bring out the cheek bones.

=== Japan ===
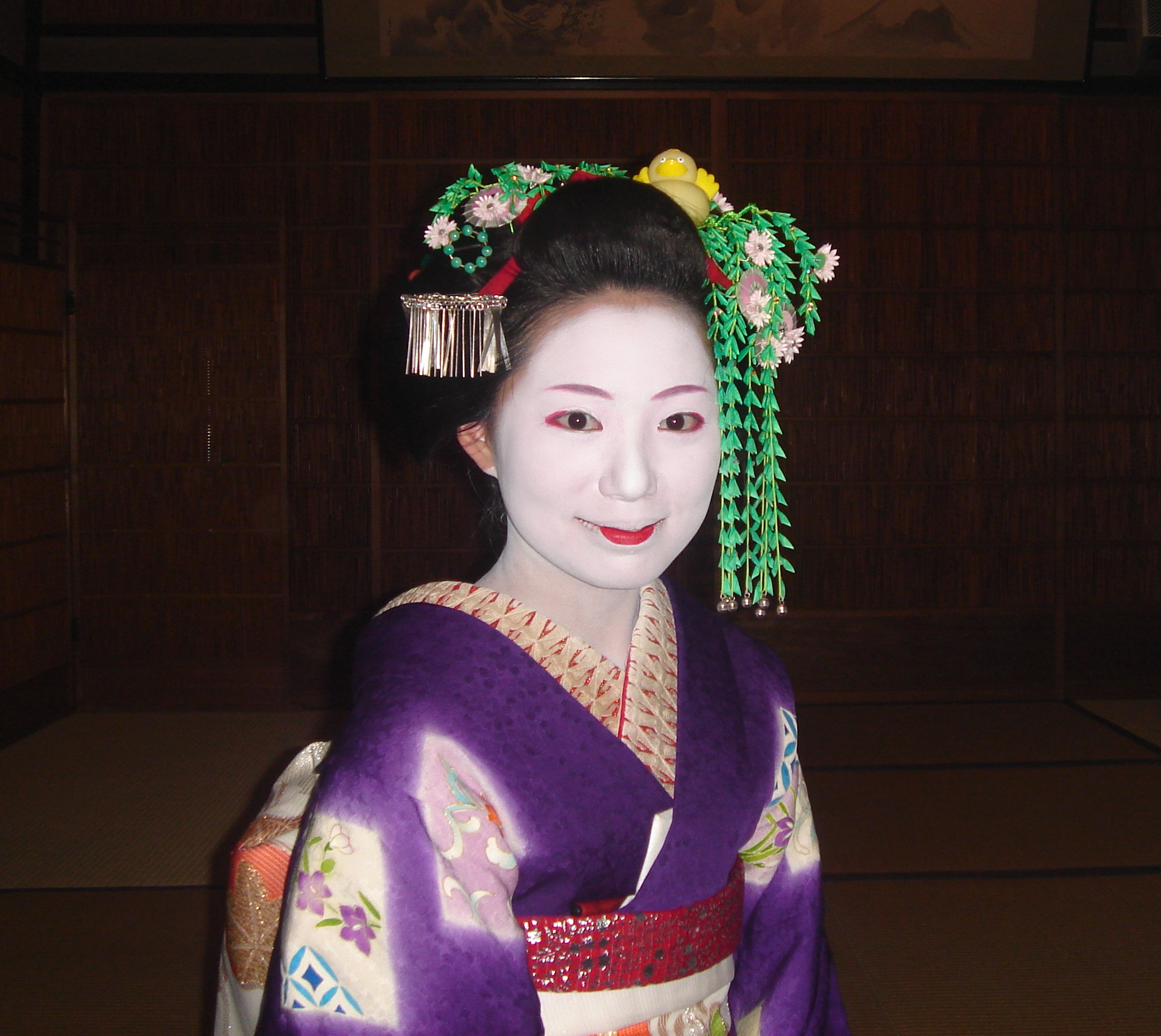
A maiko in the Gion district of Kyoto, Japan, in full make-up. The style of the lipstick indicates that she is still new.

In Japan, geisha wore lipstick made of crushed safflower petals to paint the eyebrows and edges of the eyes as well as the lips, and sticks of bintsuke wax, a softer version of the sumo wrestlers' hair wax, were used by geisha as a makeup base. Rice powder colors the face and back; rouge contours the eye socket and defines the nose. Ohaguro (black paint) colours the teeth for the ceremony, called Erikae, when maiko (apprentice geisha) graduate and become independent. The geisha would also sometimes use bird droppings to compile a lighter color. The beginning of the modern Japanese cosmetic industry began after the Meiji Restoration in 1868. New products began appearing in the markets for skin care and dermatology due to new ingredients and technologies.

== Europe ==
=== Antiquity ===
Cosmetics were used by ancient Greeks and the Romans. During the Roman Empire, the use of cosmetics was common amongst prostitutes and rich women. Such adornment was sometimes lamented by certain Roman writers, who thought it to be against the castitas required of women by what they considered traditional Roman values. Pliny the Elder mentioned cosmetics in his Naturalis Historia, and Ovid wrote a book on the topic. Later Christian writers expressed similar sentiments.

=== Medieval Europe ===
The Galenic model of health equates good skin to good health. Bad skin indicated humoral imbalance and was associated with lower socioeconomic status. That being said, smooth, soft, even, pale complexions were the beauty standard during the European Middle Ages Beauty was equated with moral goodness and harmony with the universe. While skincare was seen as a practice to take care of one's health, paint or makeup was seen as deceitful because it covered rather than enhanced the natural complexion. Skin tone was affected by changes in climate, health, emotion, or diet. Therefore, by using make-up, women could stabilize their complexions. For instance, cosmetics were used to hide anything that seemed undesirable or a marker of bad health by removing puffiness from the face and eyes, lightening the skin, covering blemishes, and removing unwanted hair. The use of cosmetics continued in Middle Ages, where the face was whitened and the cheeks rouged. Thirteenth century Italian women wore red lipstick to show that they were of high social standing.

Skincare was seen as medicinal, and involved language such as "heal" and "cure" when the products were marketed to both men and women. Recipes for skincare products were often seen in books with medicinal recipes. Many recipes were recorded for curing various skin issues like acne, redness, and dryness with face washes and ointments. Despite medicine being a male dominated space, skincare allowed women to show some expertise in science and medicine. Anna Hebrea of Rome (fl. 1508), cosmetologist of the Countess of Fiorlì Caterina Sforza (1463-1509), were some of the early modern women who experimented with the production of makeups in Europe.

Another prevalent beauty standard was healthy hair; many cosmetic treatments were concocted to address balding by stimulating hair growth. Different regions dictated which hair color was the most desirable. For example, women would dye their hair blond in regions of Italy, England, France, Castile, and Aragon.

While beauty was a sign of health and goodness, methods to achieve beauty could be harmful. Some cosmetics ingredients were detrimental to human health, such as white lead, mercury, agaric, and blackenbane. White lead was commonly used in facial creams and hair dyes, agaric was used as a lip ointment, and blackenbane was used to dye hair black. Mercury was used on severe facial scabies, to whiten the skin, and a multitude of other ailments.

The Renaissance theater frequently referenced and utilized cosmetics. For instance, recipes for creams, face-whiteners, and rouges were described in many early modern play texts. This medium allowed beauty techniques available to illiterate women and to those who did not have access to recipe books. Makeup also played a crucial role in representing both race and gender. Blackface was used to emphasize whiteness by contrast, reinforcing the idea of being white as "normal." This went beyond mere entertainment as it represented racial stereotypes and the notion of Blackness as inferior. Whereas, whiteface on young male actors helped convey femininity. The theater showed how race could be removed or "applied" through cosmetics.

=== 19th century onwards ===
Cosmetics continued to be used in the following centuries, though attitudes towards cosmetics varied throughout time, with the use of cosmetics being openly frowned upon at many points in Western history. In the 19th century, Queen Victoria publicly declared makeup improper, vulgar, and acceptable only for use by actors, with many famous actresses of the time, such as Sarah Bernhardt and Lillie Langtry using makeup.

19th-century fashion ideals of women appearing delicate, feminine and pale were achieved by some through the use of makeup, with some women discreetly using rouge on their cheeks and drops of belladonna to dilate their eyes to appear larger. Though cosmetics were used discreetly by many women, makeup in Western cultures during this time was generally frowned upon, particularly during the 1870s, when Western social etiquette increased in rigidity. Teachers and clergy were specifically forbidden from the use of cosmetic products.

== Latin America ==
Beauty standards varied by tribes. Cosmetics was typically describing an individual's social class. These tribes tend to have the product on their bodies in addition to their face. In Colombia, cosmetic products used oil or petroleum with various colors for the face and vermillion for the body. More color indicates the woman of higher class. For Nicaragua, the arms were painted with a mixture consisting of wool and the individual's blood. Like the Colombian women, the petroleum is used with the exception of the breasts to prevent interference with child development.

The Maya utilized the color red to represent social class and also used the color in funeral processes. The pigment was produced with mercury, lead, and arsenic. Other products to make the red color includes animals and plants. These items helped create more variety of reds with various tones, intensity, and sheen. Different shades of red determine a person's social status as red was represented luxury. Other colors in Maya society were blue and green made with Indigofera, malachite, azurite, veszelyite, and copper-containing minerals. Similar to red, the colors were also used in funerals and used to represent royalty. Orange and yellow were used with the same purpose of prestige being produced with hematite, goethite, and limonite.

The body was considered as their portrait to the Maya with various images of plants, animals, and humans being common images. Other designs include personal designs using geometry.

The Chinchorro culture in northern Chile followed the same principle as the Mayans regarding the significance of the color red with it being found in mummies.

== Modern ==
=== 19th century ===
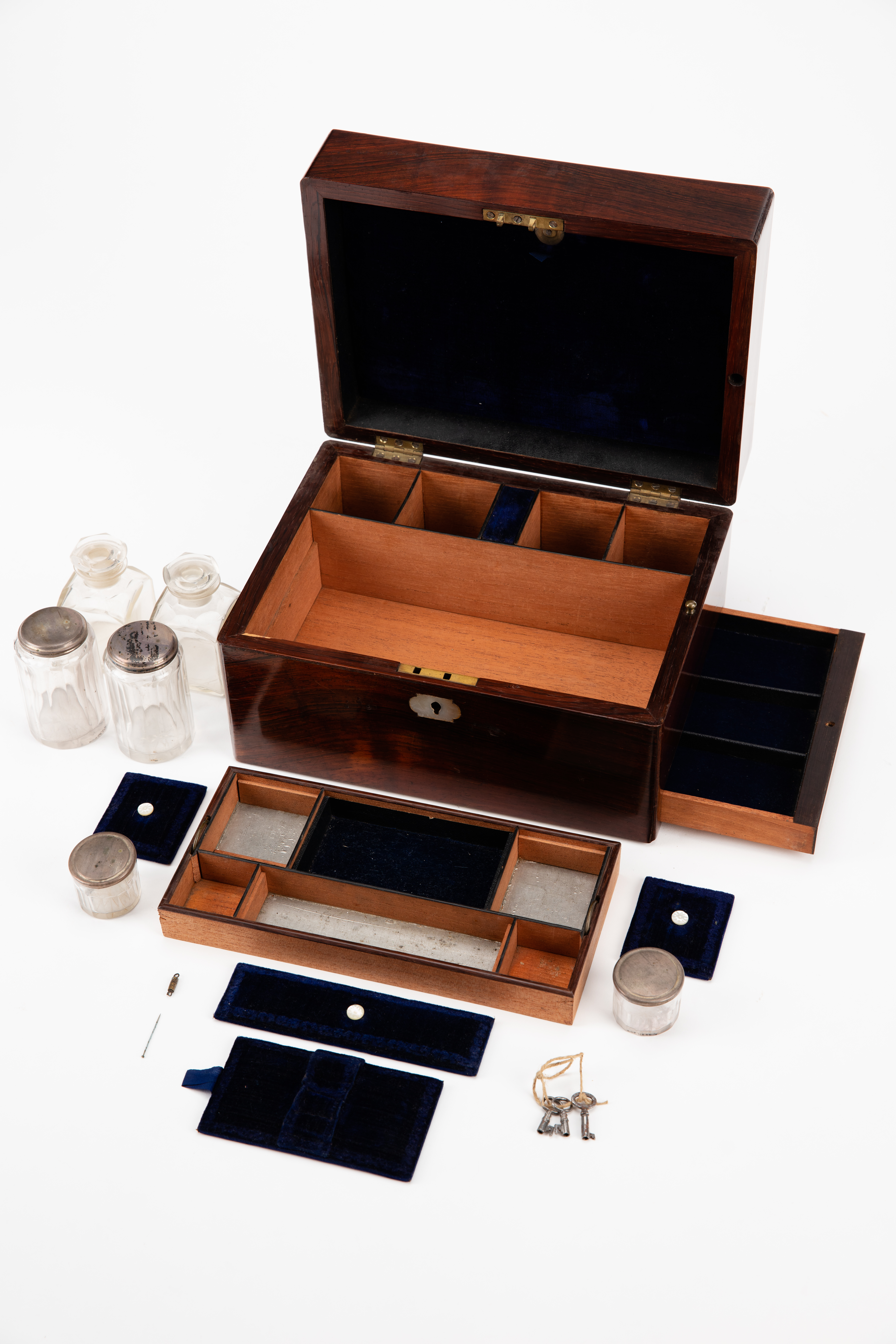
19th century beauty box

During the late 1800s, the Western cosmetics industry began to grow due to a rise in "visual self-awareness", a shift in the perception of color cosmetics, and improvements in the safety of products. Prior to the 19th century, limitations in lighting technology and access to reflective devices stifled people's ability to regularly perceive their appearance. This, in turn, limited the need for a cosmetic market and resulted in individuals creating and applying their own products at home. Several technological advancements in the latter half of the century, including the innovation of mirrors, commercial photography, marketing and electricity in the home and in public, increased consciousness of one's appearance and created a demand for cosmetic products that improved one's image.

Face powders, rouges, lipstick and similar products made from home were found to have toxic ingredients, which deterred customers from their use. Discoveries of non-toxic cosmetic ingredients, such as Henry Tetlow's 1866 use of zinc oxide as a face powder, and the distribution of cosmetic products by established companies such as Rimmel, Guerlain, and Hudnut helped popularize cosmetics to the broader public. Skincare, along with "face painting" products like powders, also became in-demand products of the cosmetics industry. The mass advertisements of cold cream brands such as Pond's through billboards, magazines, and newspapers created a high demand for the product. These advertisement and cosmetic marketing styles were soon replicated in European countries, which further increased the popularity of the advertised products in Europe.

=== 20th century ===
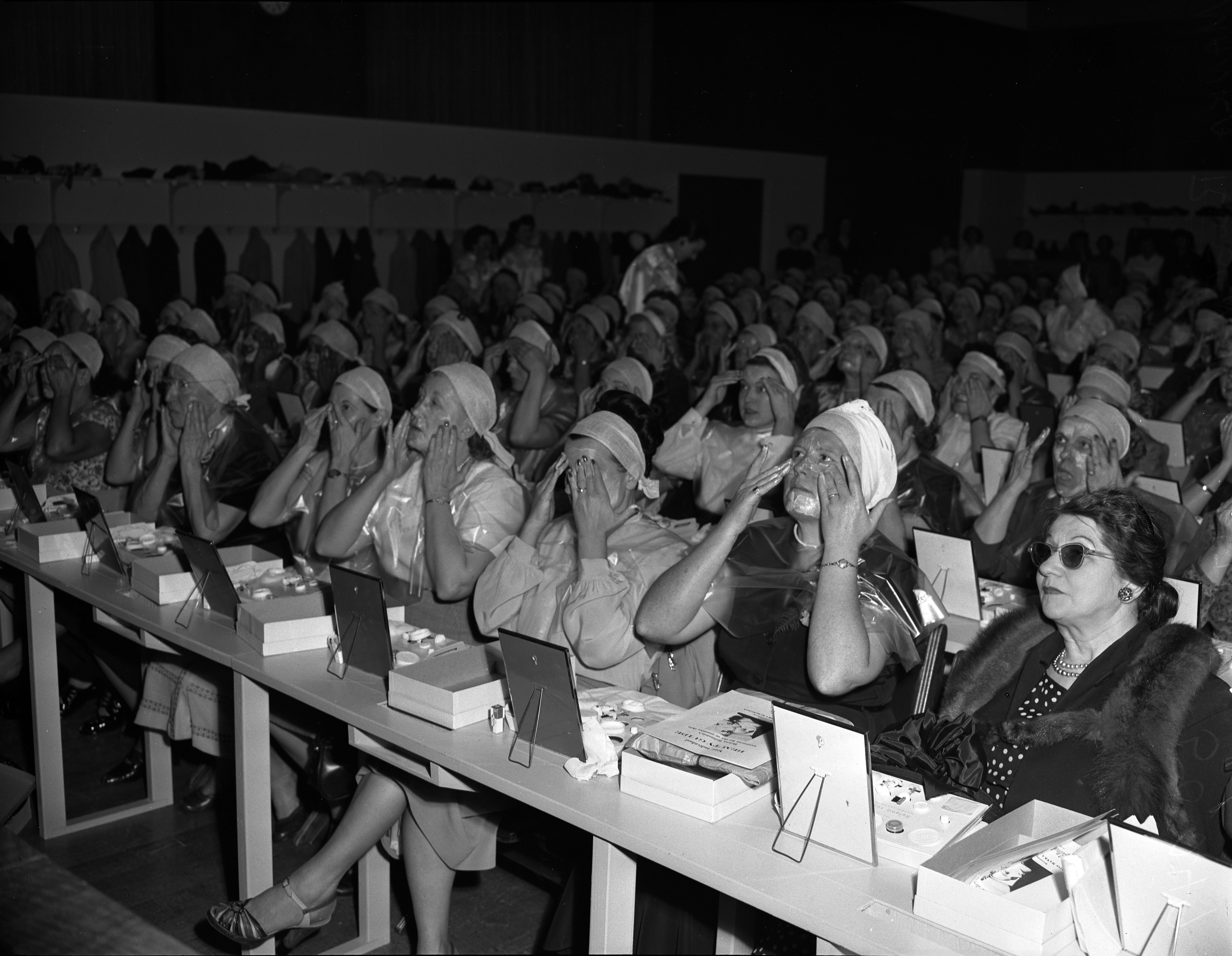
Audience applying makeup at lecture by beautician in Los Angeles, c. 1950.

During the early 1900s, makeup was not excessively popular. In fact, women hardly wore makeup at all. Make-up at this time was still mostly the territory of prostitutes, those in cabarets and on the black & white screen. Face enameling (applying actual paint to the face) became popular among the rich at this time in an attempt to look paler. This practice was dangerous due to the main ingredient often being arsenic. Pale skin was associated with wealth because it meant that one was not out working in the sun and could afford to stay inside all day. Cosmetics were so unpopular that they could not be bought in department stores; they could only be bought at theatrical costume stores. A woman's "makeup routine" often only consisted of using papier poudré, a powdered paper/oil blotting sheet, to whiten the nose in the winter and shine their cheeks in the summer. Rouge was considered provocative, so it was only seen on "women of the night." Some women used burnt matchsticks to darken eyelashes, and geranium and poppy petals to stain the lips. Vaseline became high in demand because it was used on chapped lips, as a base for hair tonic, and soap. Toilet waters were introduced in the early 1900s, but only lavender water or refined cologne was admissible for women to wear. Cosmetic deodorant was invented in 1888, by an unknown inventor from Philadelphia and was trademarked under the name "Mum". Roll-on deodorant was launched in 1952, and aerosol deodorant in 1965.

Around 1910, make-up became fashionable in the United States of America and Europe owing to the influence of ballet and theatre stars such as Mathilde Kschessinska and Sarah Bernhardt. Colored makeup was introduced in Paris upon the arrival of the Russian Ballet in 1910, where ochers and crimsons were the most typical shades. The Daily Mirror beauty book showed that cosmetics were now acceptable for the literate classes to wear. With that said, men often saw rouge as a mark of sex and sin, and rouging was considered an admission of ugliness. In 1915, a Kansas legislature proposed to make it a misdemeanor for women under the age of forty-four to wear cosmetics "for the purpose of creating a false impression." The Daily Mirror was one of the first to suggest using a pencil line (eyeliner) to elongate the eye and an eyelash curler to accentuate the lashes. Eyebrow darkener was also presented in this beauty book, created from gum Arabic, Indian ink, and rosewater. George Burchett developed cosmetic tattooing during this time period. He was able to tattoo on pink blushes, red lips, and dark eyebrows. He also was able to tattoo men disfigured in the First World War by inserting skin tones in damaged faces and by covering scars with colors more pleasing to the eye. Max Factor opened up a professional makeup studio for stage and screen actors in Los Angeles in 1909. Even though his store was intended for actors, ordinary women came in to purchase theatrical eye shadow and eyebrow pencils for their home use.

In the 1920s, the film industry in Hollywood had the most influential impact on cosmetics. Stars such as Theda Bara had a substantial effect on the makeup industry. Helena Rubinstein was Bara's makeup artist; she created mascara for the actress, relying on her experiments with kohl. Others who saw the opportunity for the mass-market of cosmetics during this time were Max Factor Sr. and Elizabeth Arden. Many of the present day makeup manufacturers were established during the 1920s and 1930s. Lipsticks were one of the most popular cosmetics of this time, more so than rouge and powder, because they were colorful and cheap. In 1915, Maurice Levy invented the metal container for lipstick, which gave license to its mass production. The Flapper style also influenced the cosmetics of the 1920s, which embraced dark eyes, red lipstick, red nail polish, and the suntan, invented as a fashion statement by Coco Chanel. The eyebrow pencil became vastly popular in the 1920s, in part because it was technologically superior to what it had been, due to a new ingredient: hydrogenated cottonseed oil (also the key constituent of another wonder product of that era Crisco Oil). The early commercial mascaras, like Maybelline, were simply pressed cakes containing soap and pigments. A woman would dip a tiny brush into hot water, rub the bristles on the cake, remove the excess by rolling the brush onto some blotting paper or a sponge, and then apply the mascara as if her eyelashes were a watercolor canvas. Eugène Schueller, founder of L'Oréal, invented modern synthetic hair dye in 1907 and he also invented sunscreen in 1936. The first patent for a nail polish was granted in 1919. Its color was a very faint pink. It's not clear how dark this rose was, but any girl whose nails were tipped in any pink darker than a baby's blush risked gossip about being "fast." Previously, only agricultural workers had sported suntans, while fashionable women kept their skins as pale as possible. In the wake of Chanel's adoption of the suntan, dozens of new fake tan products were produced to help both men and women achieve the "sun-kissed" look. In Asia, skin whitening continued to represent the ideal of beauty, as it does to this day.

In the time period after the First World War, there was a boom in cosmetic surgery. During the 1920s and 1930s, facial configuration and social identity dominated a plastic surgeon's world. Face-lifts were performed as early as 1920, but it wasn't until the 1960s when cosmetic surgery was used to reduce the signs of aging. During the twentieth century, cosmetic surgery mainly revolved around women. Men only participated in the practice if they had been disfigured by the war. Silicone implants were introduced in 1962. In the 1980s, the American Society of Plastic Surgeons made efforts to increase public awareness about plastic surgery. As a result, in 1982, the United States Supreme Court granted physicians the legal right to advertise their procedures. The optimistic and simplified nature of narrative advertisements often made the surgeries seem hazard-free, even though they were anything but. The American Society for Aesthetic Plastic Surgery reported that more than two million Americans elected to undergo cosmetic procedures, both surgical and non-surgical, in 1998, liposuction being the most popular. Breast augmentations ranked second, while numbers three, four, and five went to eye surgery, face-lifts, and chemical peels.

During the 1920s, numerous African Americans participated in skin bleaching in an attempt to lighten their complexion to brown, or to become an "intermediate" between black and white, as brownness was considered the ideal over black or white skin. Skin bleaches and hair straighteners created fortunes worth millions and accounted for a massive thirty to fifty percent of all advertisements in the black press of the decade. Oftentimes, these bleaches and straighteners were created and marketed by African American women themselves. Skin bleaches contained caustic chemicals such as hydroquinone, which suppressed the production of melanin in the skin. These bleaches could cause severe dermatitis and even death in high dosages. Many times these regimens were used daily, increasing an individual's risk.

In the 1970s, at least five companies started producing make-up for African American women. Before the 1970s, makeup shades for Black women were limited. Face makeup and lipstick did not work for dark skin types because they were created for pale skin tones. These cosmetics that were created for pale skin tones only made dark skin appear grey. Makeup artists, such as Reggie Wells, who specialized in black women celebrities, such as Oprah Winfrey developed their own shades. Eventually, makeup companies created makeup that worked for richer skin tones, such as foundations and powders that provided a natural match. Popular companies like Astarté, Afram, Libra, Flori Roberts and Fashion Fair priced the cosmetics reasonably due to the fact that they wanted to reach out to the masses.

In addition, Black women joined the consumer market in America for hair care. Due to innovations in technology in the 1940s and 1950s, Black women were given more options in hair straightening techniques. In 1954, George E. Johnson started the Johnson Product Company and introduced a safe straightening hair care system that could be purchased in stores and done at home. As America shifted into the 1960s and 1970s, the afro became a popular hairstyle and required a new set of beauty demands. The afro became a symbol of naturalness, and rose with the "Black is Beautiful Movement," as well as Black nationalism. Johnson Product Company created various hair care products to upkeep the Afro look. Products like Afro Sheen and Ultra Sheen became popular amongst Black consumers. As Black consumerism grew, White owned companies tried to make their way into the Black hair care industry. Clairol created products and advertisements that were aimed to support Black hair.

From 1939 to 1945, during the Second World War, cosmetics were in short supply. Petroleum and alcohol, basic ingredients of many cosmetics, were diverted into war supply. Ironically, at this time when they were restricted, lipstick, powder, and face cream were most desirable and most experimentation was carried out for the post war period. Cosmetic developers realized that the war would result in a phenomenal boom afterwards, so they began preparing. Yardley, Elizabeth Arden, Helena Rubinstein, and the French manufacturing company became associated with "quality" after the war because they were the oldest established. Pond's had this same appeal in the lower price range. Gala cosmetics were one of the first to give its products fantasy names, such as the lipsticks in "lantern red" and "sea coral."

During the 1960s and 1970s, many women in the western world influenced by feminism decided to go without any cosmetics. In 1968 at the feminist Miss America protest, protestors symbolically threw a number of feminine products into a "Freedom Trash Can." This included cosmetics, which were among items the protestors called "instruments of female torture" and accouterments of what they perceived to be enforced femininity.

Cosmetics in the 1970s were divided into a "natural look" for day and a more sexualized image for evening. Non-allergic makeup appeared when the bare face was in fashion as women became more interested in the chemical value of their makeup. Modern developments in technology, such as the High-shear mixer facilitated the production of cosmetics which were more natural looking and had greater staying power in wear than their predecessors. The prime cosmetic of the time was eye shadow, though; women also were interested in new lipstick colors such as lilac, green, and silver. These lipsticks were often mixed with pale pinks and whites, so women could create their own individual shades. "Blush-ons" came into the market in this decade, with Revlon giving them wide publicity. This product was applied to the forehead, lower cheeks, and chin. Contouring and highlighting the face with white eye shadow cream also became popular. Avon introduced the lady saleswoman. In fact, the whole cosmetic industry in general opened opportunities for women in business as entrepreneurs, inventors, manufacturers, distributors, and promoters.

=== 21st century ===
Beauty products are now widely available from dedicated internet-only retailers, who have more recently been joined online by established outlets, including major department stores and traditional brick-and-mortar beauty retailers.

Like most industries, cosmetic companies resist regulation by government agencies. In the U.S., the Food and Drug Administration (FDA) does not approve or review cosmetics, although it does regulate the colors that can be used in hair dyes. Cosmetic companies are not required to report injuries resulting from use of their products.

Although modern makeup has been used mainly by women traditionally, gradually an increasing number of males are using cosmetics usually associated to women to enhance their own facial features. Concealer is commonly used by cosmetic-conscious men. Cosmetics brands are releasing cosmetic products especially tailored for men, and men are using such products more commonly. There is some controversy over this, however, as many feel that men who wear makeup are neglecting traditional gender roles, and do not view men wearing cosmetics in a positive light. Others, however, view this as a sign of increasing gender equality and feel that men also have the right to enhance their facial features with cosmetics if women do.

Today the market of cosmetics has a different dynamic compared to the 20th century. Some countries are driving this economy:

- Japan: Japan is the second largest market in the world. Regarding the growth of this market, cosmetics in Japan have entered a period of stability. However, the market situation is quickly changing. Now consumers can access a lot of information on the Internet and choose many alternatives, opening up many opportunities for newcomers entering the market, looking for chances to meet the diverse needs of consumers. The size of the cosmetics market for 2010 was 2286 billion yen on the basis of the value of shipments by brand manufacturer. With a growth rate of 0.1%, the market was almost unchanged from the previous year.
- Russia: One of the most interesting emerging markets, the 5th largest in the world in 2012, the Russian perfumery and cosmetics market has shown the highest growth of 21% since 2004, reaching US$13.5 billion.
- South Korea: South Korea's cosmetic industry is on the rise with its creations, light ingredients, and aesthetic packages. In 2020, the market amassed $6.8 billion with a $2.6 billion loss due to COVID-19. The total export of products and trade increased by 16 percent with France being the largest exporter followed by the United States and Japan. Skincare products remain to be the largest imported items at 34.17 percent along with perfumes and haircare products being other large, imported goods in 2021.

With the imposition of lockdowns due to the COVID-19 pandemic and the consequent wariness to return to salons, trends that imitate salon procedures started to emerge, such as more complicated home skin-care regimens, hair color preserving products, and beauty tools. Early in the pandemic, sales on makeup essentials, like foundation and lipstick, decreased by up to 70% because of quarantining and face-covering mandates.

In Latin America's cosmetic and personal-care industry, it has been increasing significantly and become much more diverse. Within the industry, the thought of sustainability in products are considered to find alternatives to silicone and palm sourced additives. Clariant being one of the companies producing such products. One item used in products is epseama derived from seaweed. The ingredient serves as an anti-aging agent in skin products.

==== Men and makeup ====
In the 1970s, male musicians began to use makeup onstage. This included famous rock stars such as David Bowie, Alice Cooper, and the band Kiss. The use of cosmetics allowed them to create an alter ego, and were part of the visual entertainment of their shows. Currently, the popularity of TikTok has created a rise in men's cosmetics. Some men have chosen to wear nail polish, makeup, and other cosmetics to express their identity online.

== See also ==
- Cosmetics
- Female cosmetic coalitions
- Ochre
- Prehistoric art
- Symbolic culture
- Blombos Cave
