= Permanent makeup =

Cosmetic technique

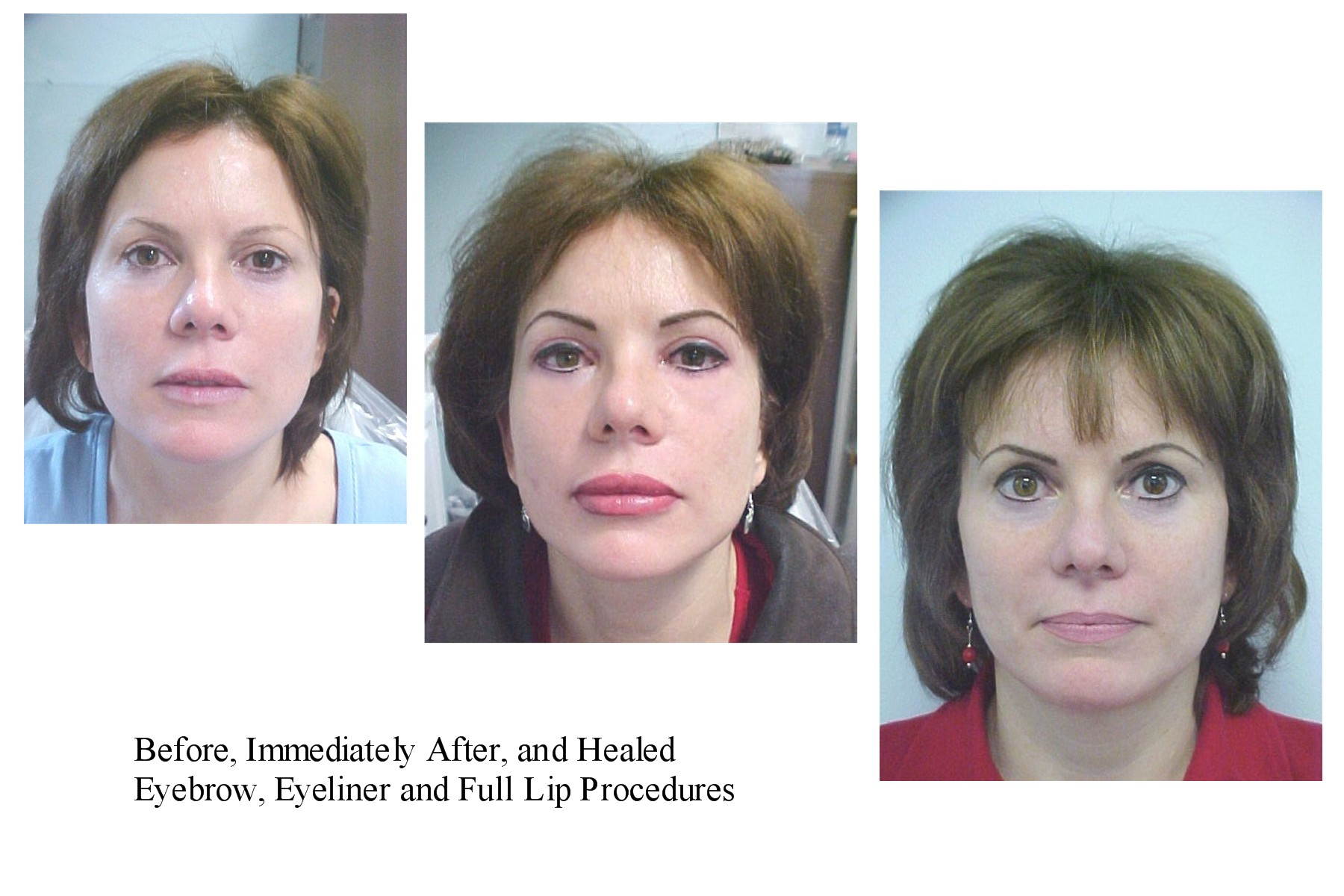
Permanent makeup: before, immediately after, and healed – brow, eyeliner, and lip procedures

Permanent makeup, also known as permanent cosmetics, derma-pigmentation, micro-pigmentation, semi-permanent makeup and cosmetic tattooing, is a cosmetic technique which employs tattoos (permanent pigmentation of the dermis) as a means of producing designs that resemble makeup, such as eye-lining and other permanent enhancing colors to the skin of the face, lips, and eyelids. It is also used to produce artificial eyebrows, particularly in people who have lost them as a consequence of old age, disease, such as alopecia areata, alopecia totalis, chemotherapy, or a genetic disturbance, and to disguise scars and hypopigmentation in the skin such as in vitiligo. It is also used to restore or enhance the breast's areola, such as after breast surgery, or to give an illusion of more hair volume to the scalp.

== History ==
The most widely documented first use of permanent makeup treatment was done by the famous U.K. tattoo artist Sutherland MacDonald. In 1902, at his parlor, #76 Jermyn Str., London, he "perfected his method of giving a lasting complexion of the utmost delicacy to pale cheeks." The tattooist George Burchett, a major developer of the technique in the 1930s, described in his memoirs how beauty salons tattooed many women without their knowledge, offering it as a "complexion treatment ... of injecting vegetable dyes under the top layer of the skin." Permanent makeup became much more commonplace beginning in the 1970s and 1980s, when it was used to address hair and pigment loss due to disease, and now it is considered very normal.

== Usage ==
=== Reasons for application ===
One may opt for permanent makeup for a plethora of reasons. For some, it can replace the daily application of traditional makeup products in favor of a more lasting solution. This is especially useful for older women whose eyesight might not be good enough to apply the makeup or who have degenerative diseases such as Parkinson's which severely limits motor ability. Others may have the procedure to restore color areas that have lost it due to disease. This includes micro pigmentation for people with alopecia and vitiligo, and areola recoloring for breast cancer patients. Permanent makeup is also a common practice in some African cultures, who use certain tattoos to signify status.

=== Popular areas ===
Some of the most common permanent makeup procedures for Americans are eyebrows and eyeliner. However, other types of permanent makeup include:

- Full lip color
- Lip liner
- Nipple/areola pigmentation
- Burn/scar camouflage/repigmentation
- Scalp tattooing
- Eyeshadow

== Results ==
As with any tattoo, there are cases of undesired results, whether that be from the initial application or degradation over time. Since this is the case, patients should come in with realistic expectations of what the makeup will look like. One factor that heavily influences how the cosmetic tattoo looks is skin tone. This is because the same color may look different on different skin tones. Another factor that affects the appearance of these tattoos is sun exposure and lifestyle, which can fade the tattoos.

== Technician information ==
As with any occupation, permanent makeup technicians need to complete required training in order to practice, although these requirements vary from state to state. The average technician completes an apprenticeship around nine months in length; however, certification programs vary from a single day to four years. Once they complete their certification, the technician must submit various documents, including proof of certification, apprenticeship, and insurance, before practicing.

Permanent cosmetics technicians are urged to comply with "standard precautions" and a uniform code of safe practice while performing cosmetic tattooing procedures. This includes assessing whether the patient should receive permanent makeup at all and informing adequately informing them about the risks associated with the practice.

== Adverse effects and health complications ==
In a study done regarding the possible complications of permanent makeup, the most common side effects were itching, redness, and the occasional swelling, all of which tended to heal after a few days. While uncommon, permanent makeup can potentially come with more serious complications, including allergic reactions to the pigments, infection, granulomas, keloids, bleeding, crusting, loss of eyelashes, or general damage to the tattooed area. Although properly trained technicians will maintain sterile conditions during application, the use of unsterilized tattooing instruments may also infect the patient with serious diseases such as HIV and hepatitis.

On very rare occasions, people with permanent makeup have reported swelling or burning in the affected areas when they underwent magnetic resonance imaging (MRI). Nevertheless, most such cases indicated that poor quality pigments, pigments adulterated with heavy metals, and pigments with diamagnetic properties may have been the causative factors. Permanent makeup can also reportedly affect the quality of an MRI image, however, complications can be avoided as long as medical professionals are previously informed.

In the United States, the inks used in permanent makeup are subject to approval as cosmetics by the Food and Drug Administration. While certain pigments in tattoos lack FDA approval for use in permanent cosmetics, competing public health priorities and lack of safety problems have consequently caused loose regulations around what color pigments tattoo inks can contain. Thus, there is little regulation on the type of inks used, with some pigments not approved for skin contact or refined only to an industrial-grade level, i.e. printers' ink, automobile paint, etc..

If a tattooist lacks proper training, patients run the risk of the artist injecting the ink too deep into their skin, causing the pigment to migrate into the surrounding tissue. As a result, the makeup may appear blurry and lack definition for thin line work. Due to their lymphatic distribution, older patients may have an increased risk for pigment migration following permanent eyelash makeup, although migration is generally avoidable by not over-working swollen tissue. Removing migrated pigment is a difficult and complicated process, so it must be avoided if possible.

== Removal ==
As with tattoos, permanent makeup can be difficult, or even impossible, to remove. Common techniques used for this are laser tattoo removal, dermabrasion (physical or chemical exfoliation), and surgical removal. Different types of chemical removals have also become a popular option for permanent makeup removal.

== See also ==
- Microblading
- Hair tattoo
