= Reggie Wells =

Reggie Wells may refer to:

- Reggie Wells (American football) (born 1980), American football player
- Reggie Wells (makeup artist) (1947–2024), American makeup artist
