= MAC Cosmetics =

International cosmetics store retail chain

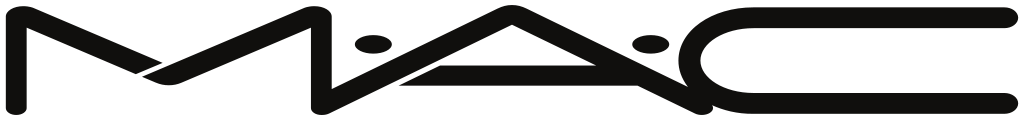
- Type: Subsidiary
- Industry: Fashion
- Founded: March 1984; 42 years ago, in Toronto, Ontario, Canada
- Founders: Frank Toskan; Frank Angelo; Vee
- Headquarters: New York City, New York, United States
- Products: Cosmetics
- Parent: Estée Lauder Companies (1998–present)
- Website: maccosmetics.com

MAC Cosmetics (stylized M•A•C Cosmetics) is a Canadian cosmetics manufacturer founded in Toronto in 1984 by Frank Toskan and Frank Angelo. The company has been headquartered in New York City since becoming a subsidiary of Estée Lauder Companies in 1998. MAC is an acronym for Make-Up Art Cosmetics.

It is named one of the top three global makeup brands, with an annual turnover of over $1 billion, and 500 independent stores, with over thirty stores in France. All stores are run by professional makeup artists. MAC is an official makeup brand, used to create makeup for movie actors. The most popular products by the brand are Studio Fix Fluid and Ruby Woo Lipstick.

== History ==
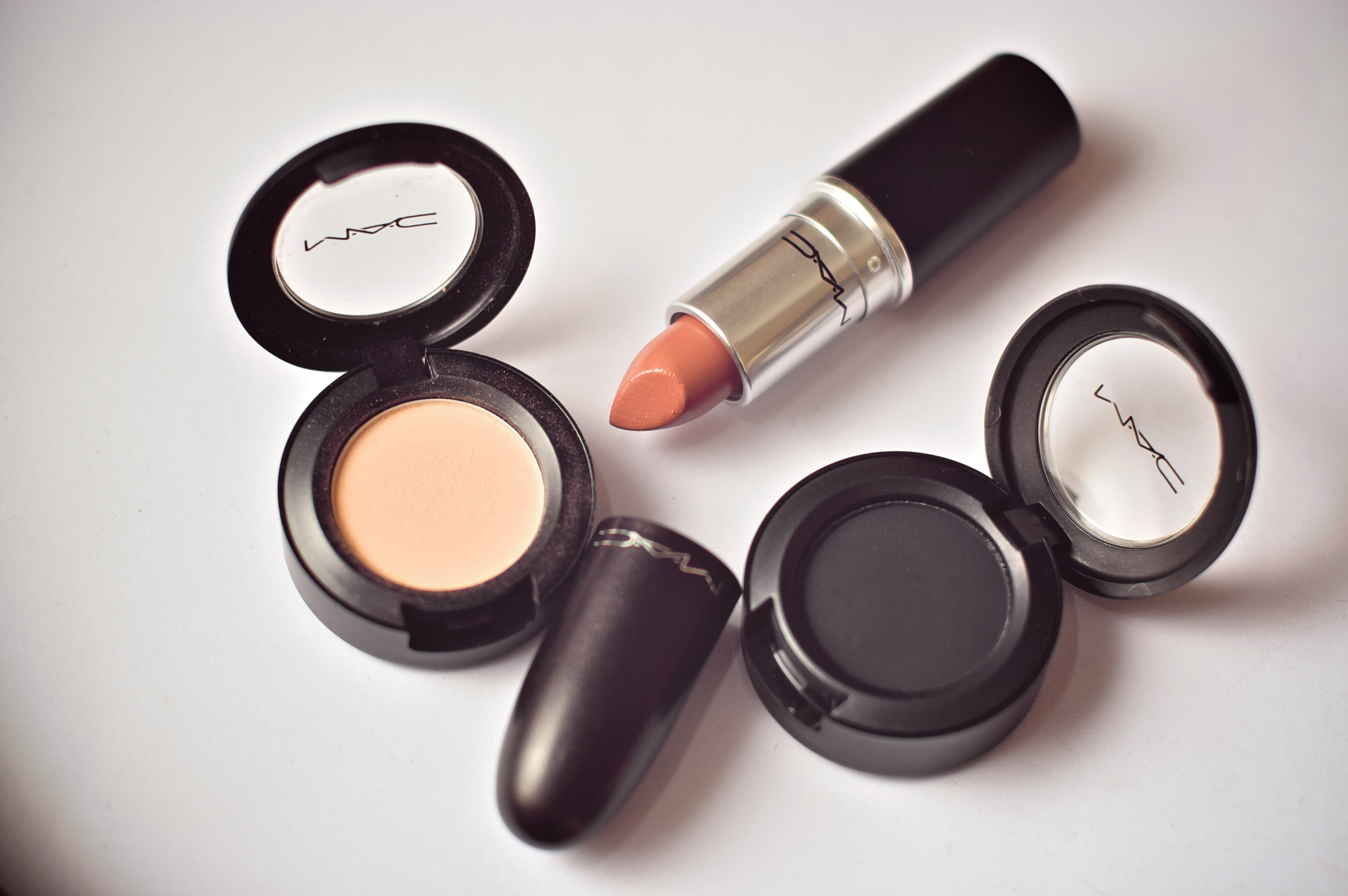
MAC lipstick and eye shadow products

The company's products were intended for makeup professionals, but are sold directly to consumers worldwide. Frank Toskan stated that he "first manufactured makeup for models, but then the models wanted this makeup for their sisters, friends, and so on... ".

In the 1990s, the brand had more than one hundred stores worldwide, earning 200 million francs. The development of the brand internationally, the opening of new points of sale, and the adaptation of product lines tailored to each continent, left little time for the founders to create new products. In 1994, the Estée Lauder Companies took control of 51% of shares of MAC Cosmetics and began managing the business end while the two founders retained creative control. In 1997, co-founder Frank Angelo died of cardiac arrest during surgery at the age of 49. Estée Lauder Inc. completed the acquisition in 1998, and Frank Toskan sold his remaining shares shortly thereafter before leaving the company at the end of the same year.

The MAC AIDS Fund was established in 1994 to support men, women, and children affected by HIV/AIDS globally by addressing the link between poverty and HIV/AIDS. According to MAC Cosmetics, the fund has raised over $400 million through the sale of MAC's Viva Glam Lipsticks and Lip glosses, donating 100% of the sale price to fight HIV/AIDS. The Viva Glam product line has been a best-seller for the MAC Cosmetics brand. MAC has collaborated with many celebrities for its Viva Glam line, on limited edition lip glosses and lipsticks to support the Mac AIDS Fund. Every year MAC selects a new spokesperson for Viva Glam. The first was drag queen RuPaul in 1994. RuPaul’s Viva Glam lipstick was the first product MAC Cosmetics advertised.

Controversy arose in September 2010, over the anticipated release of the MAC Rodarte collection, a collaborative effort with the fashion label Zara Rodarte, based on the border town of Ciudad Juárez. The city had been plagued by violence against women including hundreds of female homicides. MAC first changed the names of Juarez-related products and eventually pulled the line before distribution, and instead set up a charity which raised over $3 million in two years.

In November 2010, MAC was a sponsoring partner of the Inside Film Awards held in Sydney.

In September 2012, MAC Cosmetics launched in India firstly the "MAC Selena" collection in collaboration with the estate of Selena Quintanilla Perez. A petition on Change.org proposed the idea of this collaboration to MAC Cosmetics. Selena's sister, Suzette Quintanilla, worked with MAC to create a collection that represented Selena. The collection sold out within hours not only at MAC stores, but also at other retailers that carried the collection such as Nordstrom, Bloomingdales, and Macy's. Due to the high demand for this collection, MAC restocked the collection in December 2016. Her posthumous collaboration with MAC Cosmetics became the best-selling celebrity collection in cosmetics history.

In May 2017, MAC Cosmetics became available for purchase online at Ulta Beauty. Products became available in stores in June 2017.

On August 24, 2017, MAC Cosmetics announced that a collection involved with the estate of late singer Aaliyah will be made available in the summer of 2018. The official release date for the "MAC Aaliyah" collection was made available on June 20 online and June 21 in stores. Along with the MAC collection, MAC and i-D Magazine had partnered to release a short film titled A–Z of Aaliyah which coincided with the launch.

In May 2018, Sephora Canada announced it will carry MAC Cosmetics online and in its stores.

In March 2022, MAC Cosmetics launched their spring Wild Cherry Collection exclusively in Japan.

In January 2024, MAC opened in Rabat, Morocco.
