= Microblade =

Microblade may refer to:

- Microblade technology for the creation and use of small stone blades
- Microblading, a tattooing technique
