= Tom Riley (tattoo artist) =

19th century English tattoo artist

Tom Riley (born 1870) was a prominent English tattoo artist in the late 19th century and early 20th century, nicknamed "Professor". Riley's work, alongside rivals Alfred South and Sutherland MacDonald, was part of establishing an English style of tattooing.

== Early life and military service ==
Riley was born Thomas Clarkson in 1870, from Leeds, Yorkshire. He was apprenticed as a bricklayer but chose not to pursue that profession. Riley enlisted in the British Army in 1889; while in the army, he learned tattooing and worked on many other soldiers and officers.

Riley also fought in the Second Boer War between 1899-1902 and in Sudan.

== Career ==
Riley took drawing classes at a mechanics' institute in Leeds and opened a tattoo shop in Liverpool near the docks. He then went to Glasgow and built a reputation there, was invited to tattoo at the Royal Aquarium in London, then opened his own shop on the Strand in London. Riley tattooed King Edward VII.

Riley's style was fine-lined and influenced by Japanese tattoo designs.

== Patents ==
Some sources credit Riley with patenting the first single-coil tattoo machine in 1891, soon after Samuel O'Reilly received an American patent for the first electric tattoo machine.

In 1903, an interviewer noted that Riley was using a single-coil tattoo machine and said that Riley had co-invented it with O'Reilly, however a tattoo historian could not find any records of a British patent by Riley. Another tattoo artist, George Burchett, had said that Riley had received a British patent for a tattoo machine in December 1891, improving on Samuel O'Reilly's design. Burchett may have been misremembering Sutherland MacDonald's work, who received the first British tattoo machine patent in December 1894.
