= Eyebrow restoration =

Surgical and non-surgical restoration of eyebrow hair

Eyebrow restoration is the medical and cosmetic process of restoring eyebrow hair in people with eyebrow thinning or loss (alopecia). Causes include trauma, burns, genetic predisposition, aging, over-plucking, hormonal changes, scarring, and certain dermatologic or systemic conditions, including madarosis. Eyebrow restoration techniques aim to restore both aesthetic appearance and function, including symmetry, natural hair direction, and density.

== Clinical significance ==
Eyebrow hair contributes to facial expression, eye protection (reducing glare or sweat), and plays a role in gender differentiation and social communication. Loss of eyebrows (which may be partial or total) can lead to psychological distress, impair self-esteem, and affect quality of life. Restoration is especially relevant in cases of cicatricial (scar-related) loss, burns, surgical resections, autoimmune or dermatologic diseases.

== Techniques ==
Eyebrow restoration techniques can be broadly classified into non-surgical and surgical methods.

=== Non-surgical methods ===
These include camouflage, microblading, tattooing, and cosmetic prosthetics. These methods are semi-permanent or temporary, and involve pigment or stylistic shaping rather than hair transplantation. They are often considered first-line for mild thinning or when surgical options are not feasible or desired.

=== Surgical methods ===
Surgical approaches provide longer-lasting or permanent restoration by transplanting hair follicles or using skin flaps and grafts. Common techniques are:

- Follicular unit transplantation — donor strips from the scalp are dissected into follicular units and transplanted into recipient sites, carefully placing hairs one by one to mimic natural angles.
- Follicular unit extraction — individual follicular units are harvested one at a time, minimizing donor-area scarring. Particularly useful in cicatricial brow loss.
- Single-hair follicle transplantation — used especially in cases of scarring where precise shape, angle, and density matter. In some standardized operating procedures, high satisfaction and graft survival rates (~85%) are reported in patients undergoing this for scar-related eyebrow loss.
- Flaps and grafts — full-thickness skin grafts, scalp-skin island flaps, or transposition flaps can be used, especially for larger or medial defects. Each has trade-offs in terms of hair orientation, density, donor-site morbidity, and cosmetic realism.

== Planning considerations ==
Successful restoration depends on multiple preoperative factors:

- Donor site selection — scalp hair (posterior scalp) is often used; body hair may be considered if scalp donor hair is limited, but hair texture and growth cycles differ.
- Brow shape, direction, and angle — eyebrow is often divided into head (medial), body, arch, and tail; each has distinct hair orientation. Shape must be planned in consultation with patient (often drawn with patient seated) to align with facial features.
- Skin quality and scarring — the recipient bed must allow vascularization; scars may need adjunctive treatments (e.g. fat grafting, platelet-rich plasma, microneedling) to improve graft take.
- Number of grafts and density — depending on the amount of eyebrow loss, 50–250 grafts per eyebrow are common; survival rates may vary, and some shedding before regrowth is expected.

== Outcomes, risks and aftercare ==
Outcomes are generally positive when techniques and planning are optimal. Patients often report improved appearance, symmetry, natural hair growth, and psychological benefit. Survival rates are frequently above 70-80 % in modern procedures.

Risks include donor-site morbidity, unnatural hair orientation, asymmetry, failure of grafts to take, infection, or visible scarring. Hair from scalp continues to grow like scalp hair — needing regular grooming or trimming.

Aftercare includes keeping the recipient area clean and dry initially, avoidance of trauma, crusting management, regular monitoring. Hair shedding typically occurs within first few weeks, with visible regrowth starting around 3-4 months, and full or near-full results by 8-12 months post-procedure.
