= Hair tattoo =

Scalp tattoo giving the illusion of hair

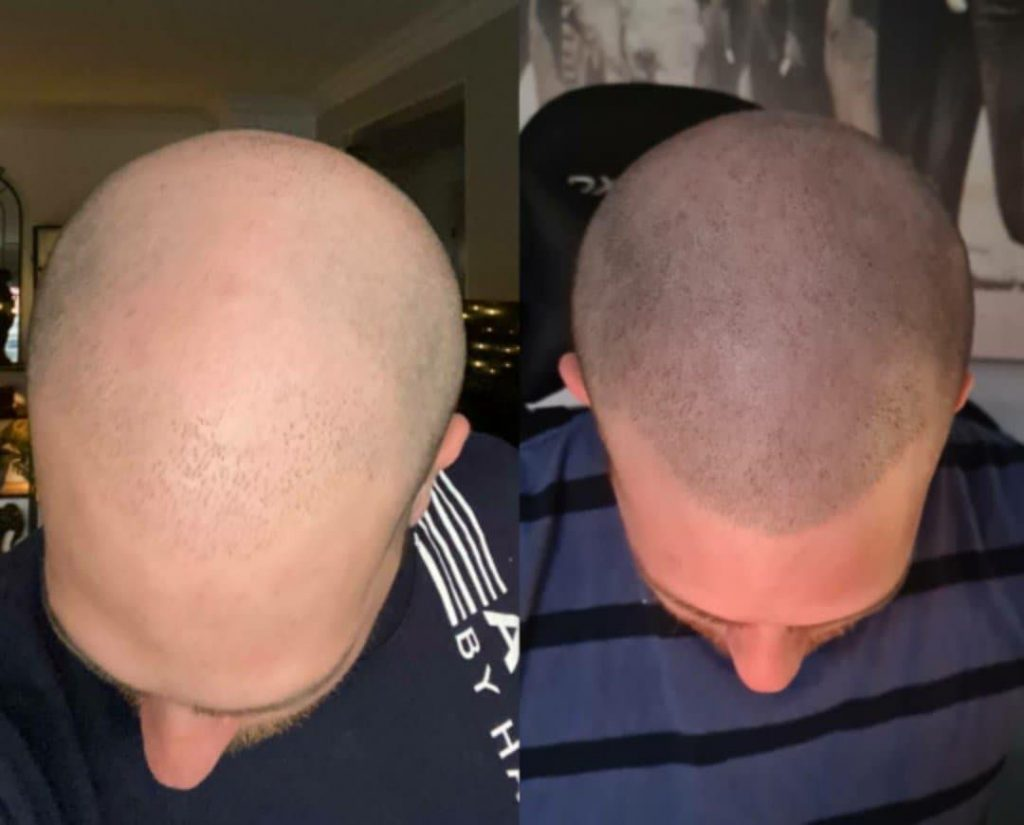
Before and after scalp micropigmentation

A hair tattoo or scalp micropigmentation (SMP) is a non-surgical, superficial cosmetic tattoo that gives the illusion of a close buzz cut hairstyle on a bald head or density to a thinning crown. The procedure can also be used to conceal scars from hair transplantation and hide the visual impact of burns or scars on the head. Scalp micropigmentation can be performed on all ethnicities. Scalp micropigmentation (SMP) is a non-invasive cosmetic procedure that involves depositing pigment into the scalp to create the appearance of tiny hair follicles, thereby giving the illusion of a fuller head of hair. Unlike traditional tattoos, which penetrate deeper into the skin, SMP is designed to be more superficial, targeting the epidermal and upper dermal layers. This approach helps in avoiding the appearance of larger, more noticeable impressions, resulting in a more natural look. One of the advantages of SMP is that the hairline can be adjusted or touched up with relative ease, allowing for modifications over time as desired.

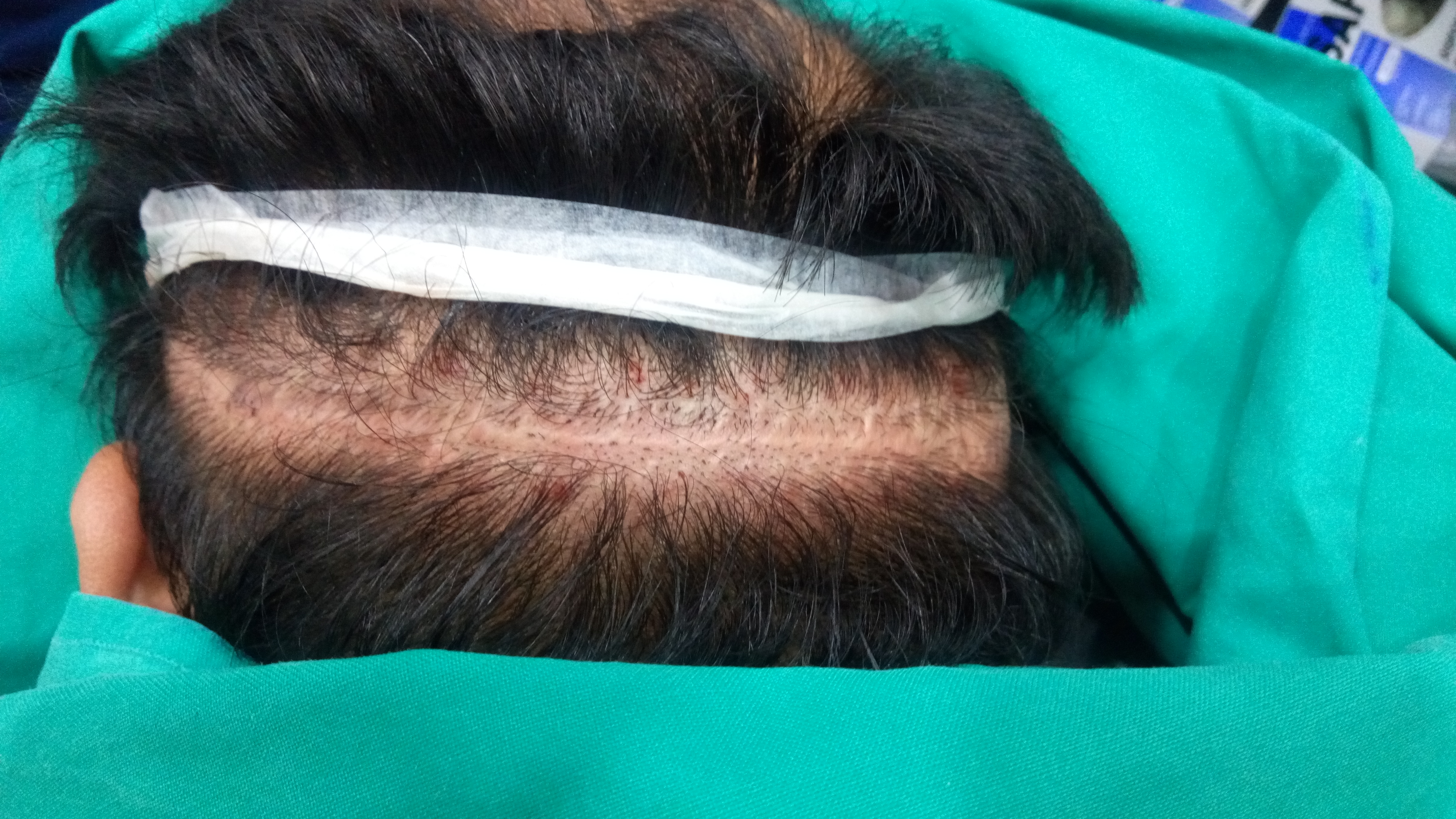
Before scalp micropigmentation on the back of the head

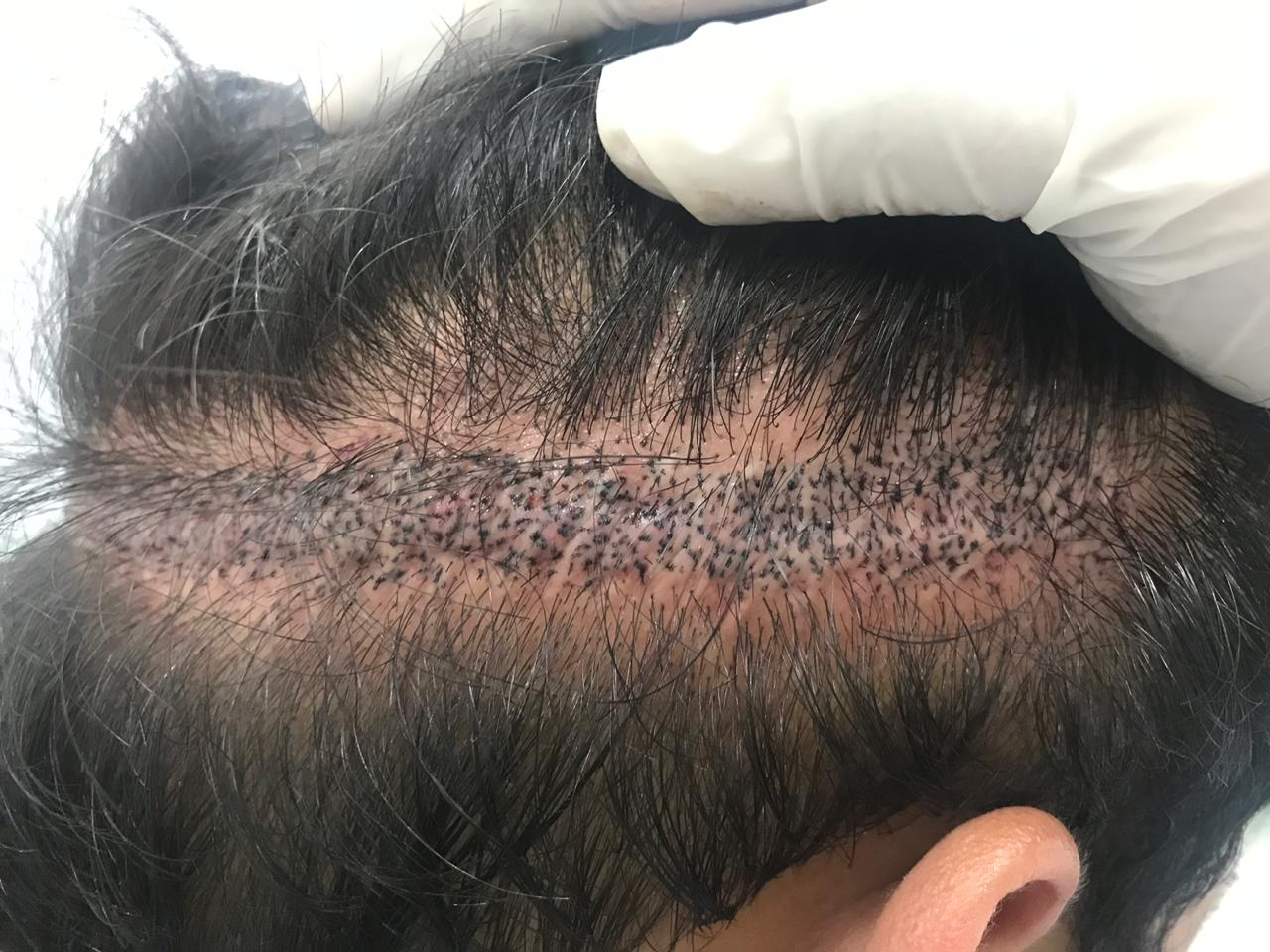
After scalp micropigmentation on the back of the head

The cost of scalp micropigmentation depends on a variety of factors, such as location, proximity of the clinic, and the severity of hair loss. The procedure takes three to four sessions which usually last about two hours each. The chosen ink color matches the current color of the hair follicle. Although scalp micropigmentation is a permanent treatment, it can be removed with laser treatment. There are no scientific data on whether people have suffered side effects over the past ten years as long as the ink used is from a reputable distributor. Practitioners may opt to perform a small patch test on an inconspicuous part of the scalp before performing the full treatment to rule out allergies to the ink. When researching a location that offers this service, the hairline is one of the most crucial aspects of the treatment. If this procedure is not done properly, it can in some cases leave the patron with an unnatural finish.

Microblading has been used to address the appearance of thinning hair at hairlines.
