= George Burchett =

British tattoo artist

- Born: George Burchett-Davis; 23 August 1872; Brighton, East Sussex, England
- Died: 3 April 1953 (age 80); Morden, Surrey, England
- Other names: King of Tattooists
- Occupation(s): Tattoo artist Inventor
- Spouse: Edith Smith Walters

George "Professor" Burchett (23 August 1872 – 3 April 1953) was an English tattoo artist known as the "King of Tattooists".

== Profile ==
Burchett was born George Burchett-Davis on 23 August 1872 in the English seaside town of Brighton, East Sussex. He was expelled from school at age 12 for tattooing his classmates. He joined the Royal Navy at age 13 (see boy seaman). He developed his tattooing skills while travelling overseas as a deckhand on HMS Vincent. After absconding from the Navy, he returned to England.

In 1900, Burchett became a full-time tattoo artist. With studios on Mile End Road and at 72 Waterloo Road, London, Burchett became the first star tattooist and a favourite among the wealthy upper class and European royalty. Among his customers were King Alfonso XIII of Spain, King Frederik IX of Denmark, and performer Horace "The Great Omi" Ridler. Though it was reputed that he tattooed the "Sailor King" George V of the United Kingdom, there is no reliable evidence to attest to this actually being the case.

He constantly designed new tattoos from his worldwide travel, incorporating African, Japanese and Southeast Asian motifs into his work. In the 1930s, he developed cosmetic tattooing with such techniques as permanently darkening eyebrows.

He continued tattooing until his sudden death on Good Friday in 1953 at the age of 80. A purported autobiography, Memoirs of a Tattooist, edited by Peter Leighton (a pseudonym of writer Edward Spiro, also known as EH Cookridge), was published in 1958 by Oldbourne Book Company, five years after Burchett's death. This work included photographs illustrating some of Burchett's tattoo designs. Recent research has revealed that, despite the claims made in the foreword, the text was not actually compiled and edited from Burchett's own notes, but cribbed quickly from newspaper articles made shortly after Burchett's death.

== See also ==
- Tom Riley
- Sutherland Macdonald

== Selected bibliography ==
- Michelle D. Miranda (2015). Forensic Analysis of Tattoos and Tattoo Inks. CRC Press. ISBN 978-1-498-7364-35..
- Gay, Kathlyn; Whittington, Christine (2002). Body Marks: Tattooing, Piercing, and Scarification. Twenty-First Century Books. ISBN 0-761-3235-2X..
- Margo DeMello (2007). Encyclopedia of Body Adornment. ABC-CLIO. p. 105. ISBN 978-0-313-3369-59.
- Reiter, Jon (2012). King of Tattooists: The Life and Work of George Burchett. Solid State Publishing Company. ISBN 978-0-578-1092-44.
