= Microblading =

Tattooing technique

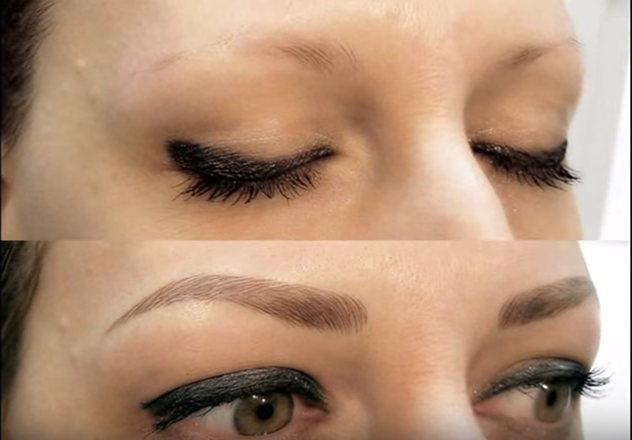
Before and after microblading

Microblading is a tattoo technique used on eyebrows to create, enhance, or alter their shape and color. To apply this form of semi-permanent makeup, a technician uses a small handheld tool made of several tiny needles to add semi-permanent pigment to the skin. Microblading differs from the most common process of tattooing as each hair stroke is created by hand with a tiny needle that creates fine slices in the skin, whereas eyebrow tattoos are done with a tattoo machine. Microblading deposits pigment into the upper region of the dermis, so it fades more rapidly than machine tattooing techniques. Microblading is also referred to as eyebrow embroidery, eyebrow feathering, microstroking, 3D eyebrows, nanoblading or hair-like strokes.

== History ==
Eyebrow tattooing was originally developed for eyebrow restoration, as a medical tattoo to minimize the appearance of hair loss in the eyebrows (madarosis). Along with other forms of permanent makeup, cosmetic eyebrow tattooing became more common in the 1980s and 1990s in the United States and Asia, including in Japan, Taiwan, and Singapore. Some dermatologists offered early forms of this service for both medical and cosmetic purposes, and trained cosmetologists on it. Practitioners used a tattoo machine or a fine needle to apply dye by hand.

The microblading technique for eyebrows, typically called eyebrow embroidery in its early years, became popular in Singapore by about 2007. Microblading became a popular method of filling in eyebrows in the United States and Canada by the mid-2010s. Technique names such as 3D or 6D eyebrows were also popularized.

== Application ==
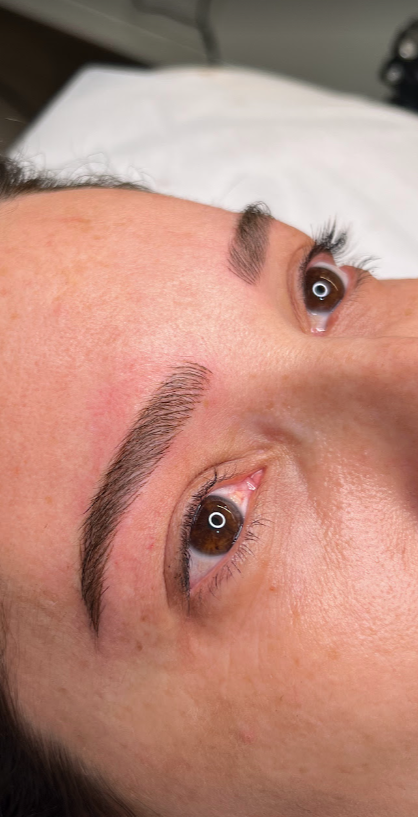
After microblading

Microblading is performed in medical clinics and cosmetic studios. The technician performing the microblading procedure first consults with the client to explain the procedure and potential side effects, then measures the eyebrow area and plans the eyebrow shape informed by input from the client, ensuring symmetry. The most common pigments (tattoo ink) used for microblading are based on iron oxide, which produces a dark brown or black color. Pigments are sold in pre-mixed shades for different skin tones. The technician typically applies the pigment using a microblading "pen" that holds a disposable set of tiny needles; there are many options available for the number, flexibility, and fineness of the needles. The technician must ensure the equipment, pigment, and application process is sterile.

Along with filling in eyebrows, microblading has been used to address the appearance of thinning hair at hairlines. A related micro-pigmentation process, hair tattooing, provides the appearance of hair on the scalp.

== Durability ==
The microblading procedure is a semi-permanent tattoo. Like all tattoos, microblading can fade, depending on multiple factors, including the quality of pigment used, UV exposure, skin type, elements found in skincare products, and/or medications. A treatment may last up to two years. A touch-up session is encouraged six weeks after the first microblading procedure, and every 12–18 months thereafter. Over time, pigment may spread and dye may fade unevenly.

== Safety ==
Safety precautions for microblading are similar to those for any other tattooing technique. The most common complications and client dissatisfaction that result from any form of tattooing are a misapplication of the pigment, pigment migration, colour change, and in some cases, unintended hyperpigmentation. Serious complications are uncommon. As with all forms of tattooing, the risks associated with microblading include the transmission of blood-borne pathogenic organisms (e.g. HIV, hepatitis C, staphylococcus aureus, herpes simplex), as well as short-term or long-term reactions to pigment ingredients. There is the potential for granulomas to form on the tattooed areas as a result of the pigment, a foreign substance, being injected into the skin.

In the U.S., microblading is not regulated at the federal level, and there is no standard for testing for the ink. In Canada, microblading is a personal service regulated by provinces. Procedures performed by technicians who have completed a comprehensive course of instruction can minimize the risk of unwanted outcomes and client dissatisfaction.
