= Sutherland Macdonald =

English tattoo artist

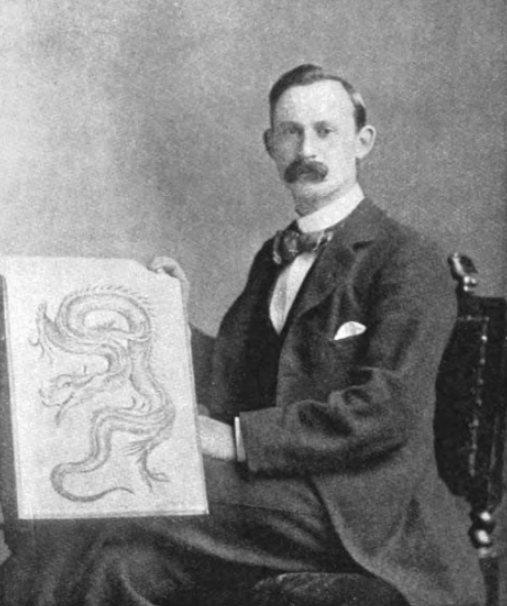
- In The Sketch, 23 January 1895
- Born: 25 June 1860; Boundary Terrace, Leeds, Yorkshire, England
- Died: 18 June 1942 (aged 81); Surbiton, London, England
- Burial place: Surbiton Cemetery
- Occupation: Tattoo artist
- Spouse(s): Sophia Weedon Annie Caroline Mayne (M:1887); Amy Mary Keen (M:1934)
- Parents: Robert Macdonald (1821/2–1898) (father); Elizabeth Mitchell Macdonald (1821–1893) (mother)

Sutherland Macdonald (1860–1942) was a prominent English tattoo artist in the late 19th century and early 20th century, and the first tattooist in Britain with an identifiable premises open to the public. After a start, tattooing mainly soldiers, at his Victorian Turkish baths in Aldershot, he was appointed Stewart at the London Hammam in Jermyn Street. Soon he was tattooing there in the basement, and later in a roof-top studio specially built for him. Listed in the 1894 London Post Office Directory, he is considered the first person to offer a professional tattoo service in London, although the practice was already popular in Japan and the Middle East prior to that time. He was erroneously said to have tattooed kings and princes, including George V when he was Duke of York.

== Life and career ==
Sutherland Macdonald was born in Boundary Terrace, Leeds on 25 June 1860. He served in the British Army in the 1870s as a telegraph operator in the Royal Engineers and was in the Anglo-Zulu War.

In addition to artistic designs, he also performed color blending on skin grafts of accident victims.

He died on 18 June 1942 at his home on 3 Guilford Avenue, Surbiton, and is buried at Surbiton Cemetery.

== Legacy ==
On 29 January 2016, the Museum of London opened a display which included some of his work called Tattoo London.

== Gallery ==
Tattoos by Sutherland Macdonald, circa 1905:

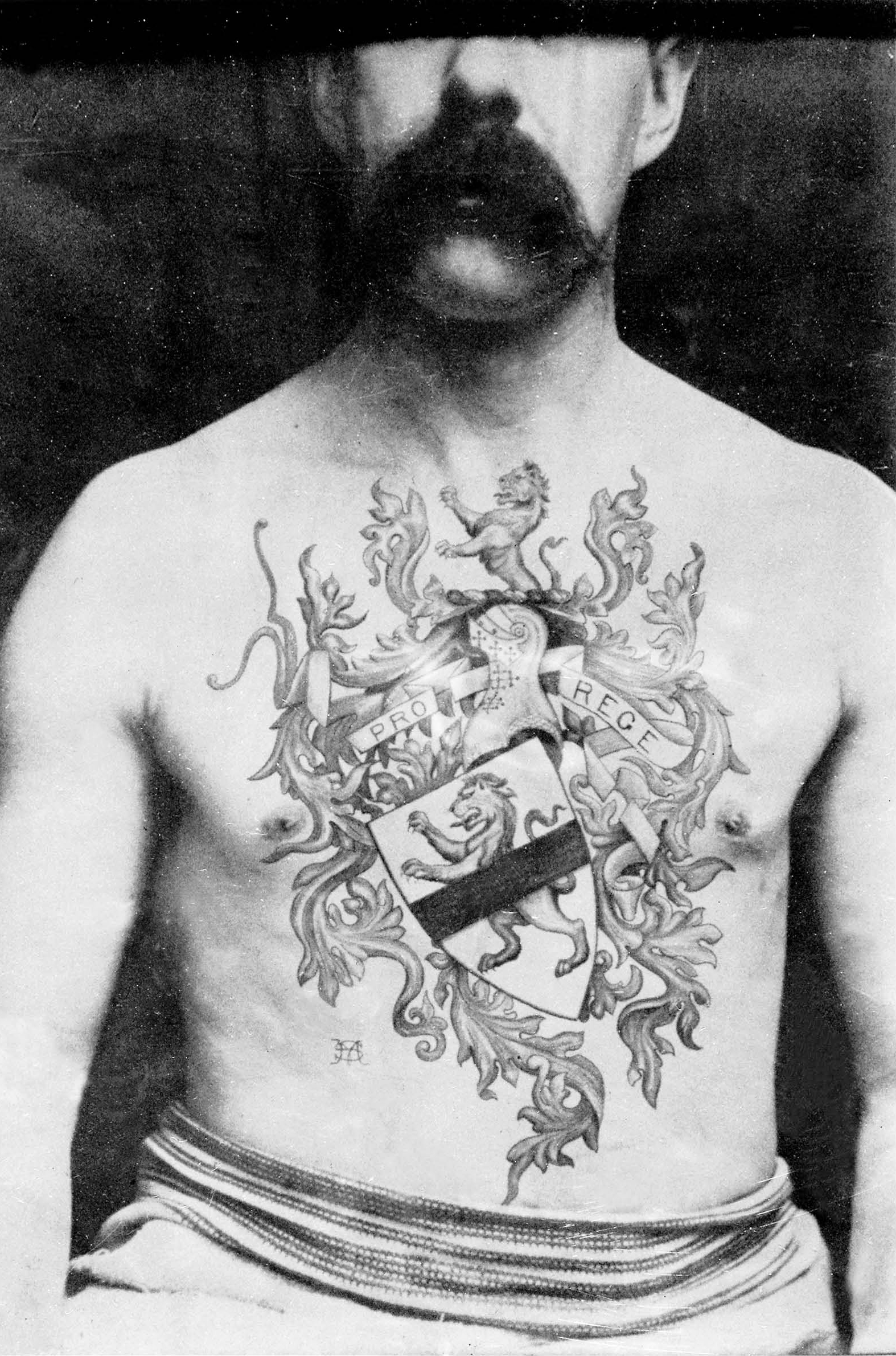
Coat of arms

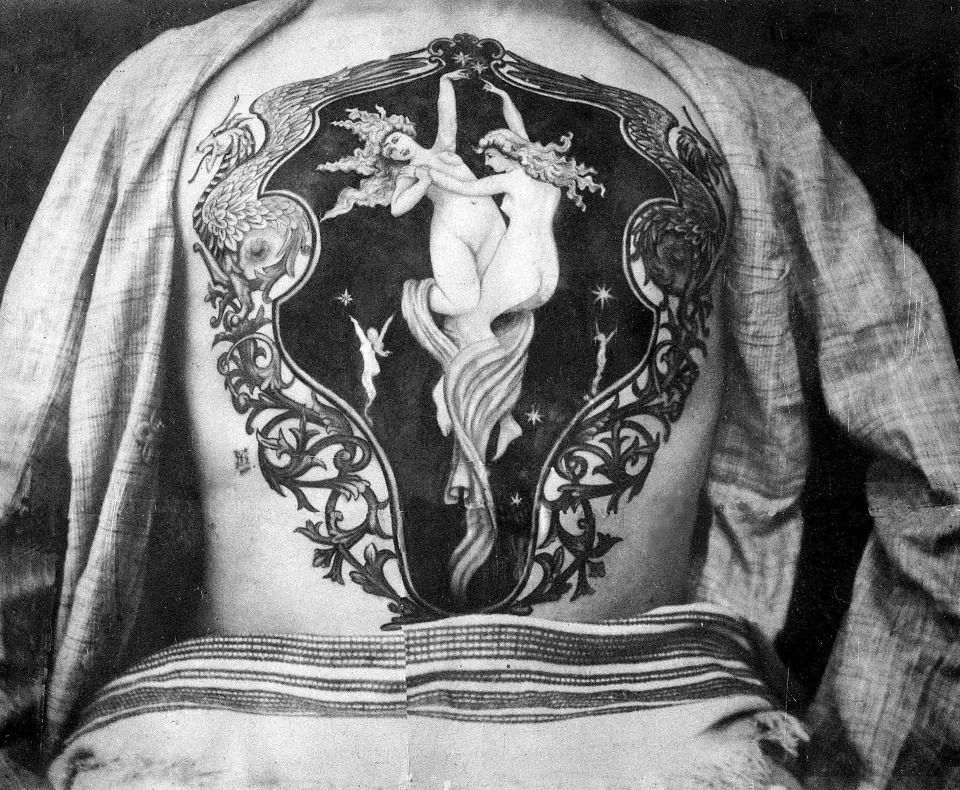
Female figures

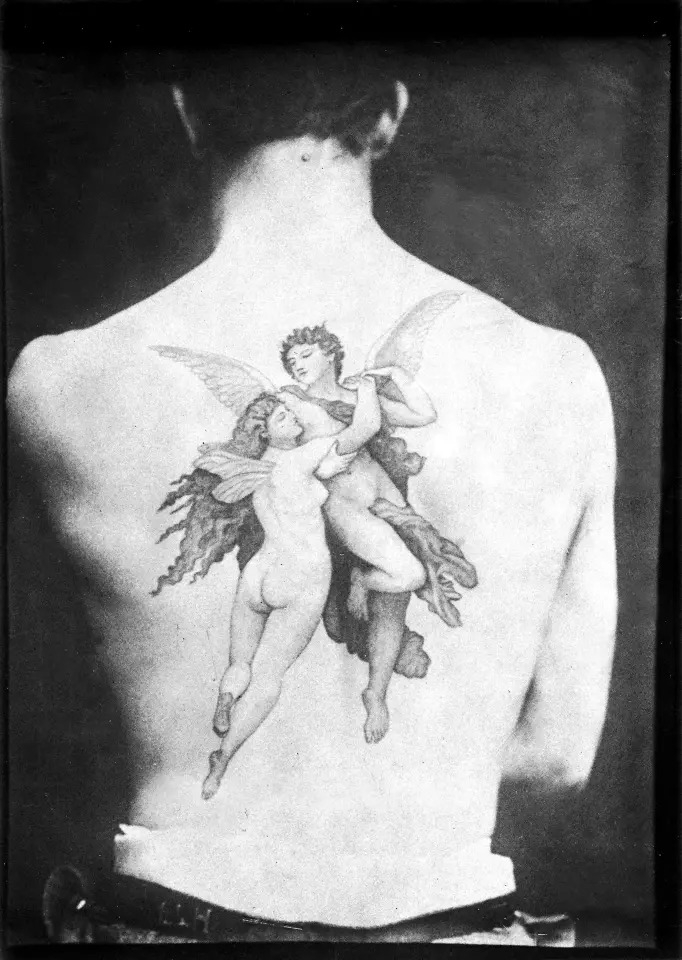
Cupid and Psyche

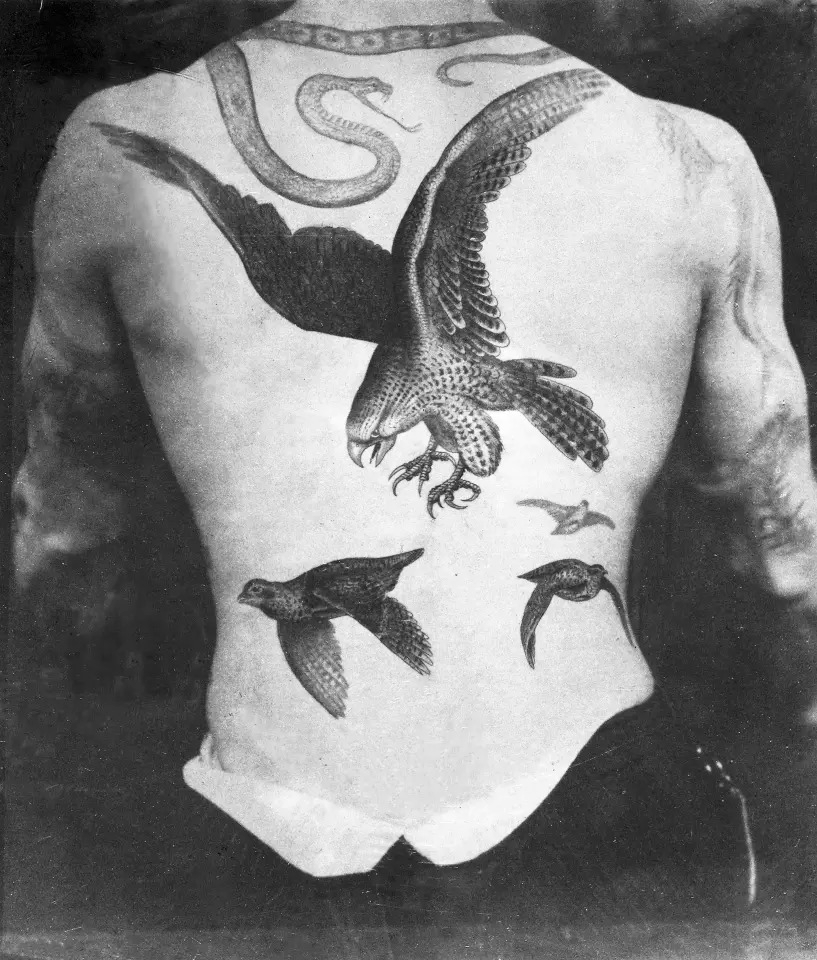
Birds of prey

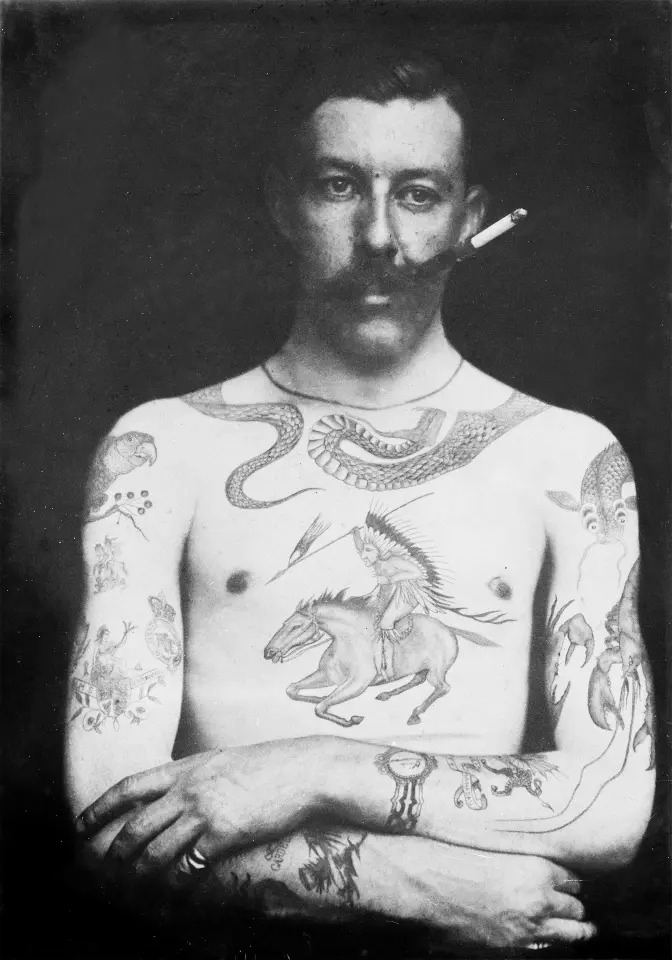
Indian on horseback

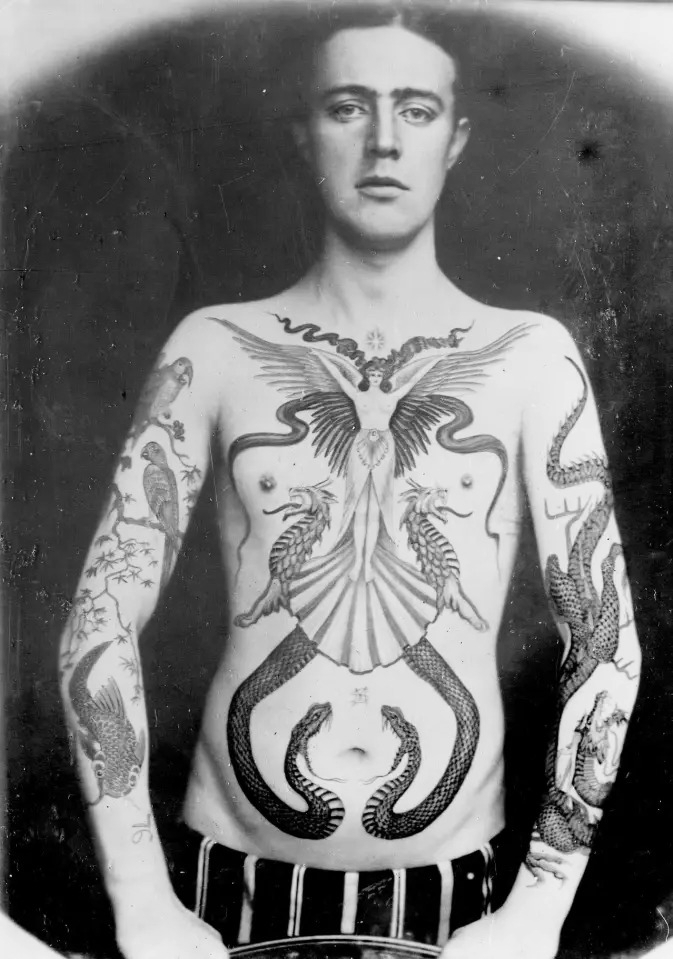
Female winged figure, dragons, and snakes

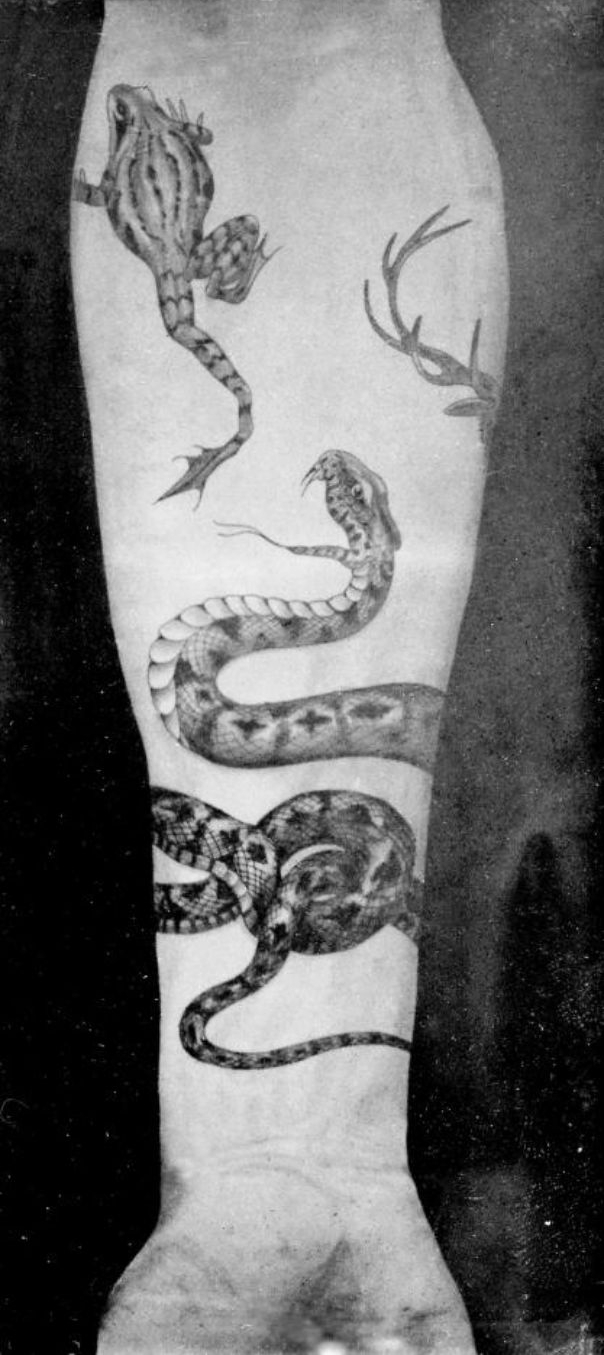
Snake and frog

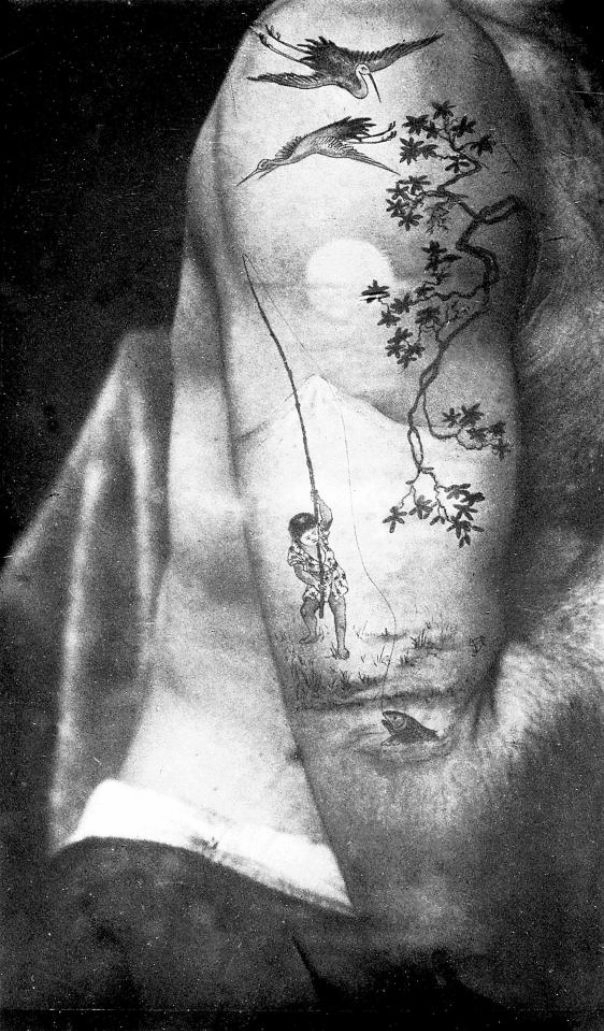
Japanese fishing scene

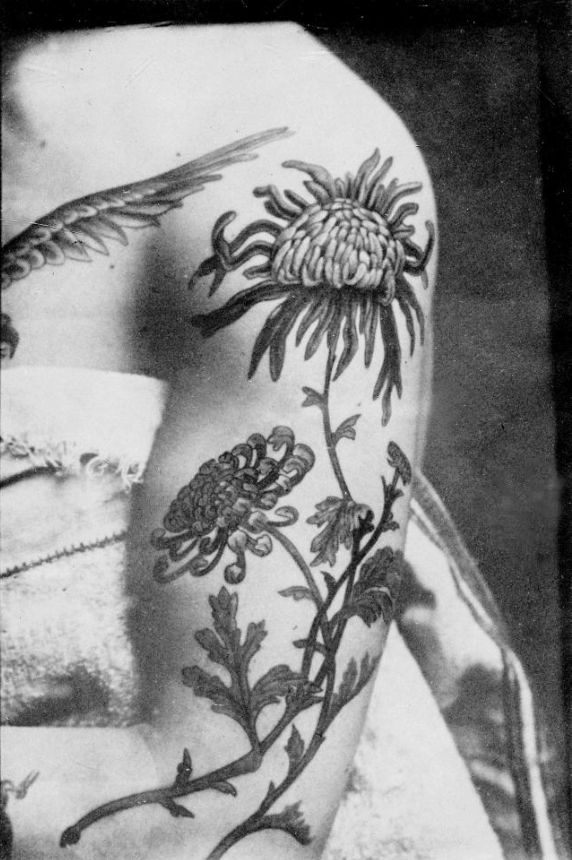
Chrysanthemums

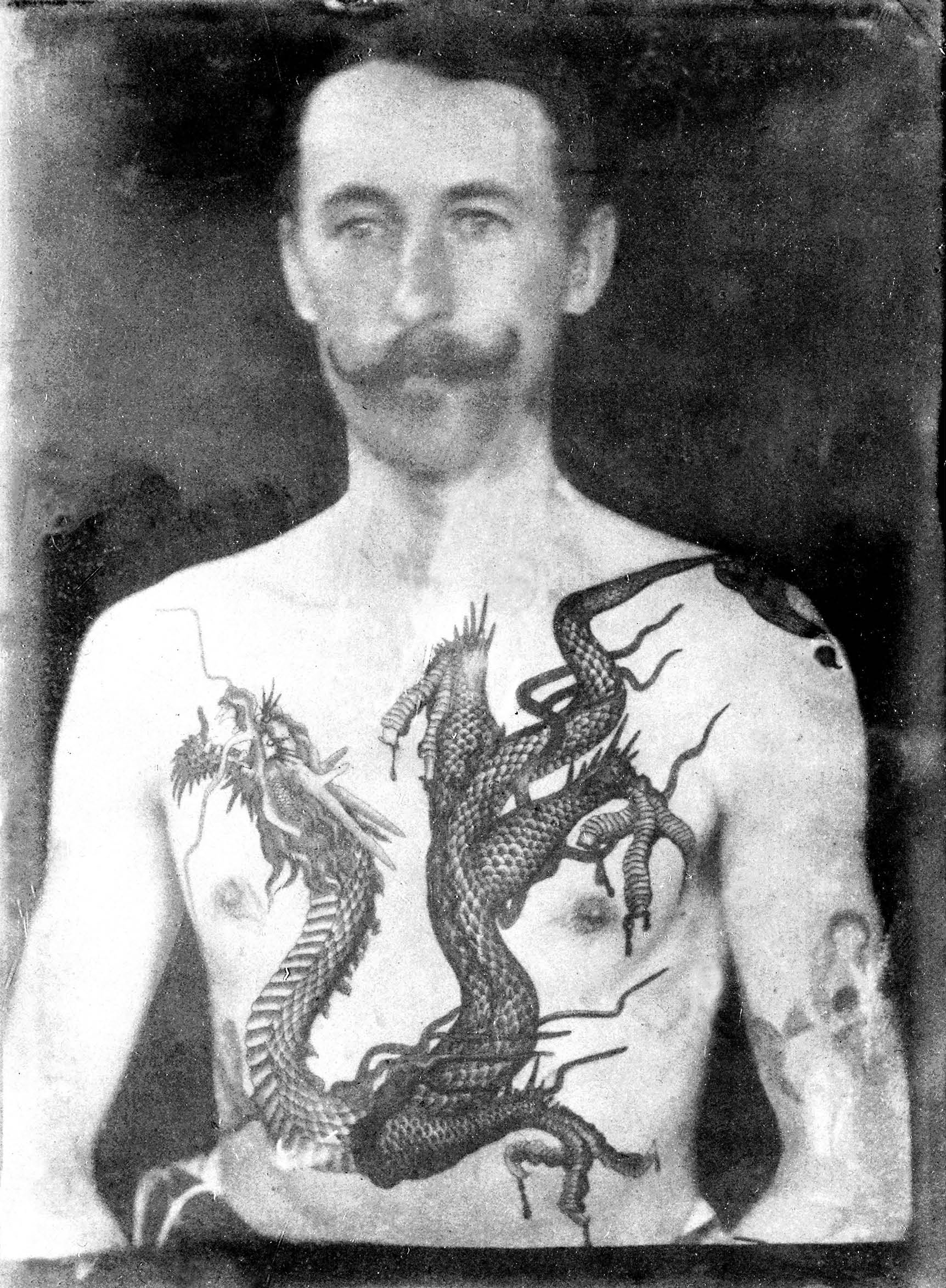
Dragon

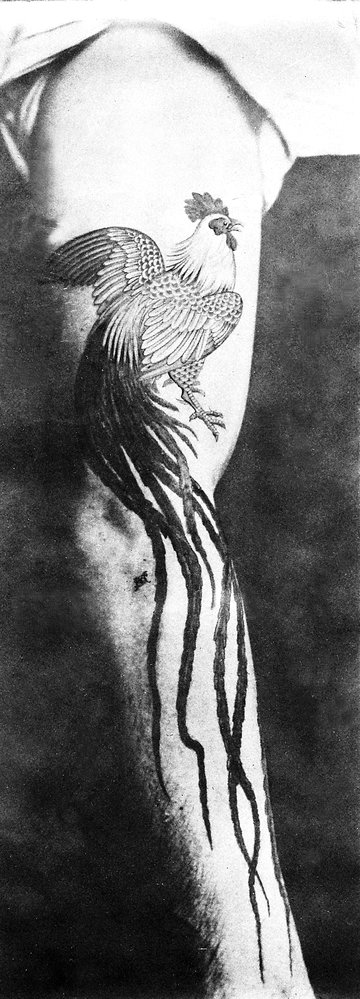
Cockerel

== See also ==
- George Burchett
- Tom Riley
