= Anna Hebrea =

Historical figure

Anna Hebrea also known as Anna the Hebrew or Anna of Rome (fl. 1508) was an Italian-Jewish beautician and cosmetician. She is one of the earliest businesswomen of her profession to be documented.

== Career ==
She was established in Rome and evidently successful in her business and well known, as she received orders from outside from Rome. In the Middle Ages, the business of cosmetics was lucrative but had a bad reputation. It was often practiced by Jewish women, as women were traditionally associated with ointments.

She is known for the business letter she sent from Rome to her client Caterina Sforza in Florence on 15 March 1508, which is a valuable and perhaps unique document for a contemporary woman of her profession. In the letter she described her products, their prices and the instructions for their use.

An excerpt of the letter reads:

"To begin with, I gave him a black salve, which removes roughness of the face and makes the flesh supple and smooth. Put this salve on at night, and allow it to remain on till the morning. Then wash yourself with pure river water. Next, bathe your face in the lotion that is called Acqua da Canicare [smoothing water], then put on a dab of this white cream; and then take less than a chickpea-sized amount of this powder, dissolve it in the lotion called Acqua Dolce [gentle water] and put it on your face—the thinner the better. The black salve costs four carlini an ounce; the Acqua da Canicare, four carlini a small bottle. The salve—that is the white cream—costs eight carlini an ounce; the powder, one gold ducat an ounce, and the Acqua Dolce will cost you a gold ducat for a small bottle. [...] P.S. The black salve is bitter. If it should happen to go into the mouth, you may be assured that it is nothing dangerous; the bitterness comes from the aloe in it."

Caterine Sforza resided in Florence at the time, and Anna thus appear to be famed outside of Rome.
