= Reggie Wells (makeup artist) =

American makeup artist (1947–2024)

- Born: December 2, 1947
- Died: January 8, 2024 (aged 76)
- Occupation: Makeup artist

Reggie Wells (December 2, 1947 – January 8, 2024) was an American makeup artist. He was the personal makeup artist of Oprah Winfrey for nearly 30 years. He was nominated for five Daytime Emmys for his work on The Oprah Winfrey Show, and won an Emmy in 1995. He was the author of the book Face Painting: African American Beauty Techniques From an Emmy Award-Winning Makeup Artist.

== Early life and education ==
Wells grew up in West Baltimore as one of seven children. His father was a bus driver and his mother was a nurse. He graduated from the Maryland Institute College of Art. He was interested in makeup from an early age. He transformed a female cousin from a 10th grade "ugly duckling" into a 12th grade prom queen. He was inspired by the work of makeup artist Way Bandy.

== Career ==
In 1978, Wells moved to New York City, where he worked at cosmetics counters in department stores. His first celebrity client was Leontyne Price for the cover of her album Leontyne Price Sings Verdi, also in 1978. He then got magazine work, such as the covers of Galmour, Harper's Bazaar, and Life. He became a specialist in makeup for black women and men, including formulating his own colors. The reason for the custom formulations was there was little in the way of makeup designed for black people at the time. In 1989, he was hired to do the makeup for the Oprah Winfrey show. He was also the first person to put makeup on boxer Mike Tyson for a Pepsi commercial.

== Notable clients ==
Wells notable clients included:

- Oprah Winfrey
- Aretha Franklin
- Iman
- Leontyne Price
- Whitney Houston
- Patti LaBelle
- Lauryn Hill
- Sean Combs
- Brandy
- Leontyne Price
- Phylicia Rashad
- Anita Baker
- Eddie Murphy
- Janet Jackson
- Brooke Shields
- Robin Givens
- Mike Tyson

== Death ==
Wells died in his hometown of Baltimore on January 8, 2024, after a long illness, at the age of 76.
