= Eyebrow =

Facial feature

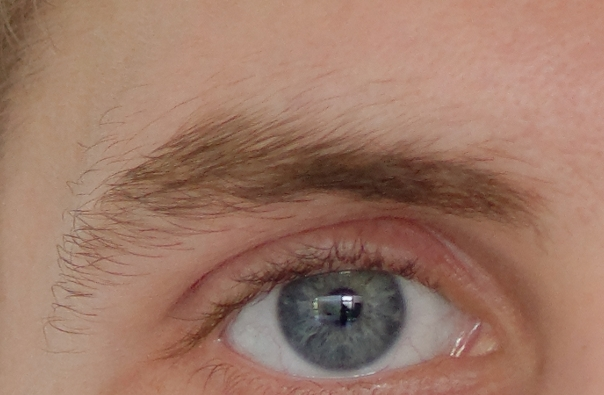
- An eyebrow and eye

Details

Identifiers
- Latin: supercilium
- MeSH: D005138
- TA98: A15.2.07.023; A16.0.00.017
- TA2: 181
- FMA: 54237

An eyebrow is an area of short terminal hairs above each eye that follows the shape of the lower margin of the brow ridges of some mammals. In humans, eyebrows serve two main functions: first, prevention of sweat, water, and other debris from falling down into the eye socket, and second, communication through facial expression. It is relatively common for people to modify their eyebrows by means of hair removal and makeup.

== Functions ==
A number of theories have been proposed to explain the function of the eyebrow in humans. One approach suggests that its main function is to prevent moisture (mostly sweat and rain) from flowing into the eye. Another theory holds that clearly visible eyebrows, paired with eyelashes, formed eyespots to deter predators when early hominid groups started sleeping on the ground.

Recent research, however, suggests eyebrows in humans developed as a means of communication and that this is their primary function. Humans developed a smooth forehead with visible, hairy eyebrows capable of a wide range of movement. Such eyebrows can express a wide range of subtle emotions – including recognition and sympathy.

== Cosmetic modification ==
An eyebrow that has been modified via waxing

Fashion in eyebrow shape has changed throughout the ages and eyebrows have always featured heavily in female fashion, often as part of cultural demands made on women about body hair.

Cosmetic methods over the centuries have been developed to alter the appearance of eyebrows by adding or removing hair, changing the color, or changing the position to meet the aesthetic ideal of the time, for example, by tinting the eyebrow with permanent dye, similar to hair colour, often in order to darken them.

Cosmetics tools such as eyebrow brushes, shaders, and pencils are often used to define the eyebrow or make it appear fuller. These can create an outline for the brows or mimic hairs where there are sparse areas. Brow gels are also used to create the look of thicker brows by adding texture to the hairs, making them appear fuller and more defined. Brow powders or even eyeshadows are used for those who want a fuller and more natural look, by placing the brow powder or eyeshadow (closest to the natural hair colour) in areas where there is less hair.

Several options exist for removing hair to achieve a thinner or smaller eyebrow, or to "correct" a unibrow, including manual and electronic tweezing, waxing, and threading. The most common method is to use tweezers to thin out and shape the eyebrow. Waxing is becoming more popular. Lastly, there is threading eyebrows, where a cotton thread is rolled over hair to pull it out. Small scissors are sometimes used to trim the eyebrows, either with another method of hair removal or alone. All of these methods can be painful for seconds or minutes due to the sensitivity of the area around the eye but, often, this pain decreases over time as the individual becomes used to it. In time, hair that has been plucked will stop growing back. Some people wax or shave off their eyebrows and leave them bare, stencil or draw them in with eye liner or tattoo them on. In Western societies, it has become more common for men to pluck part of their eyebrows.

To create a fuller look, eyebrows can be cloned in an eyebrow transplant. Individual strands of the eyebrow are created to mimic a natural-looking eyebrow of the desired shape. The process of eyebrow transplant is quite similar to the process of hair transplant. In this process as well, follicles from an active area are transferred to the area where there are no hairs. Follicles are mostly taken from the back of the head because it is the best harvesting site when it comes to hairs. The follicles are then injected into the skin.

The healing process after an eyebrow transplant is similar to the process of tattoo. In this process, patients may experience light bruising and crusting of the skin. People who have genetically thin eyebrows or who have over-tweezed are considered ideal for the transplant.

An eyebrow lift is a cosmetic surgery to raise the eyebrow, usually to create a more feminine or youthful appearance. It is not a new phenomenon, with the earliest description of brow lifting published in medical literature in 1919 by French surgeon Raymond Passot. Brows can be affected during a face lift or an eye lift. In the 1970s, doctors started injecting patients' eyebrows with botox or similar toxins to paralyse the muscles temporarily, causing the brow to raise.

Japanese women and men from the 8th century practiced hikimayu: shaving or plucking the eyebrow hair and painting smudge-like ones higher on the forehead or pencilling in thin ones in a different place. This practice is comparable to that in the Elizabethan era when high-status women would remove eyebrows altogether. Thin eyebrows, achieved by rigorous plucking, were again fashionable in the 1920s and 1930s.

In the 21st century, tattooing became popular as a way to achieve and maintain an eyebrow shape, using a coil machine, rotary machine or a manual tool containing a row of needles. This process, also called cosmetic tattooing or microblading involves an eyebrow artist implanting pigments in small, precise cuts that mimic the look of hair. Shaving lines in eyebrows is another cosmetic alteration, popular among some younger people in the 1990s and 2000s.

== Gallery ==
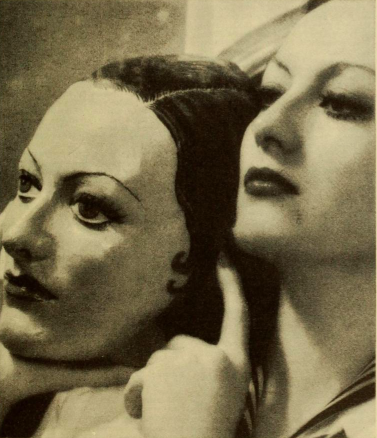
Joan Crawford sporting the pencil thin eyebrows that were typical of 1930s fashion.

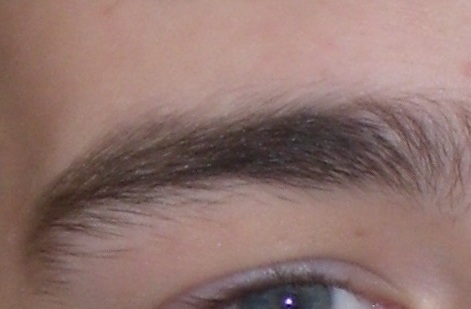
Eyebrows often thicken with puberty.

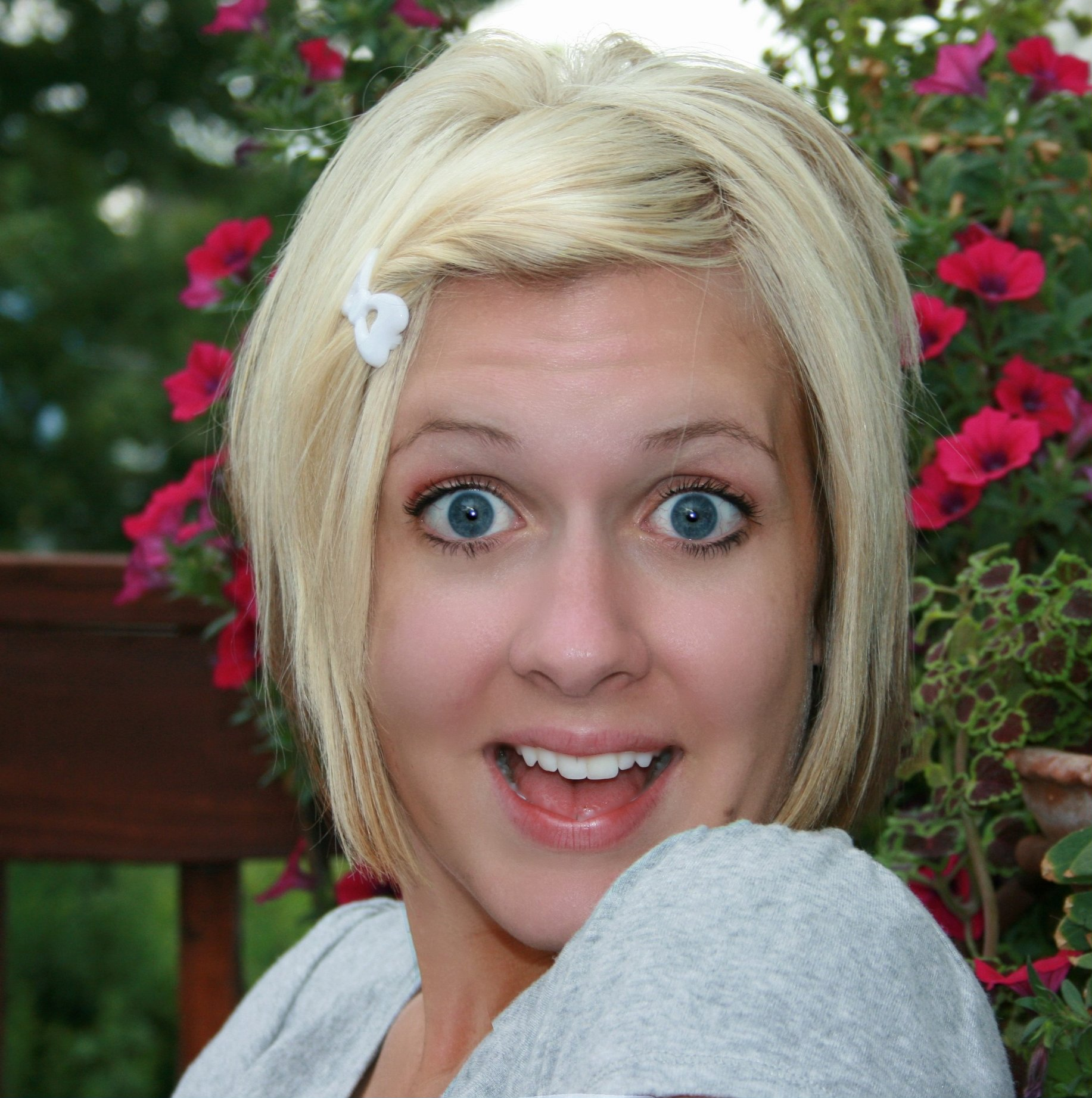
Eyebrows can be used to convey emotion, such as surprise.

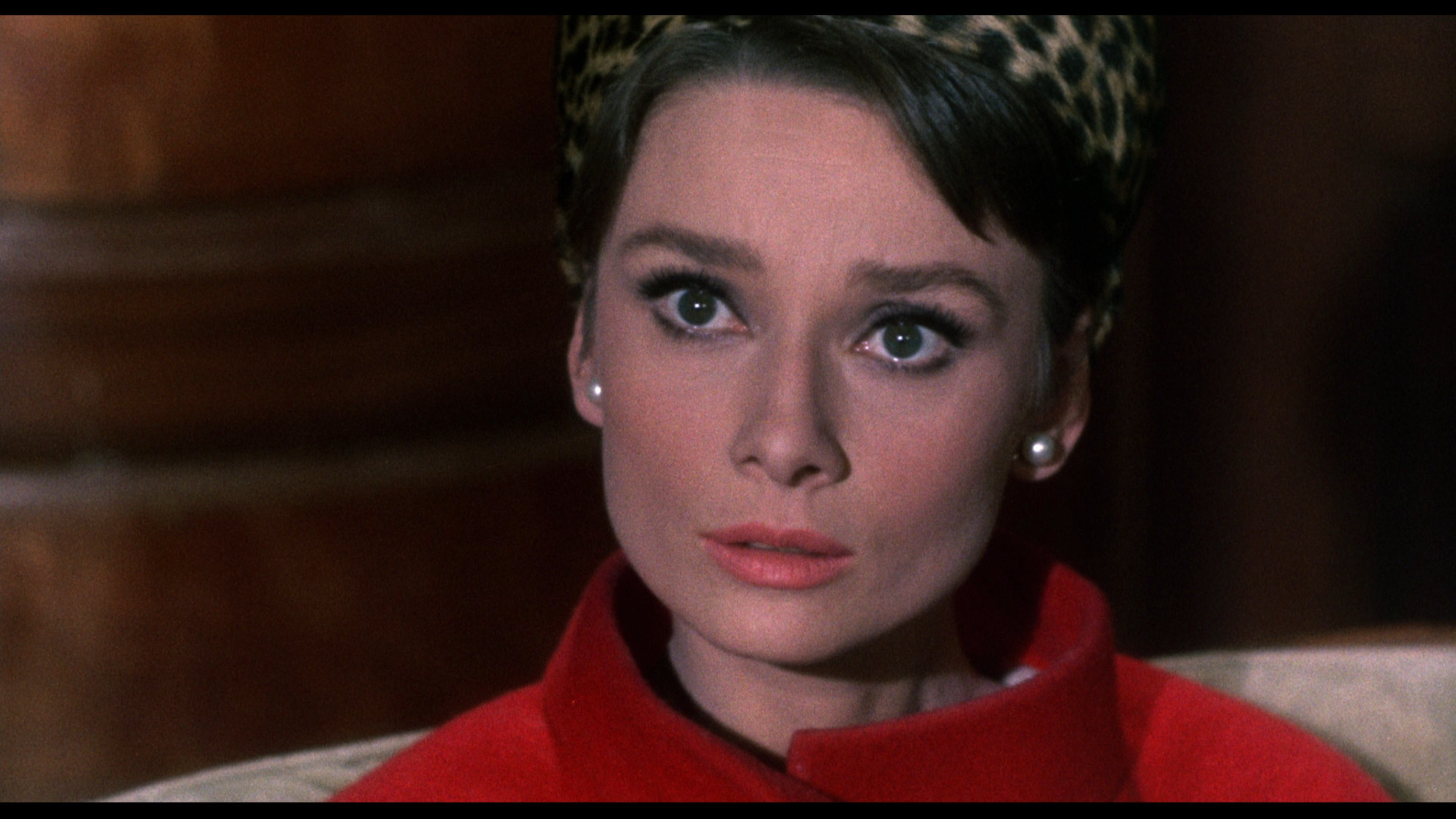
One of Audrey Hepburn's trademarks was her thick eyebrows.

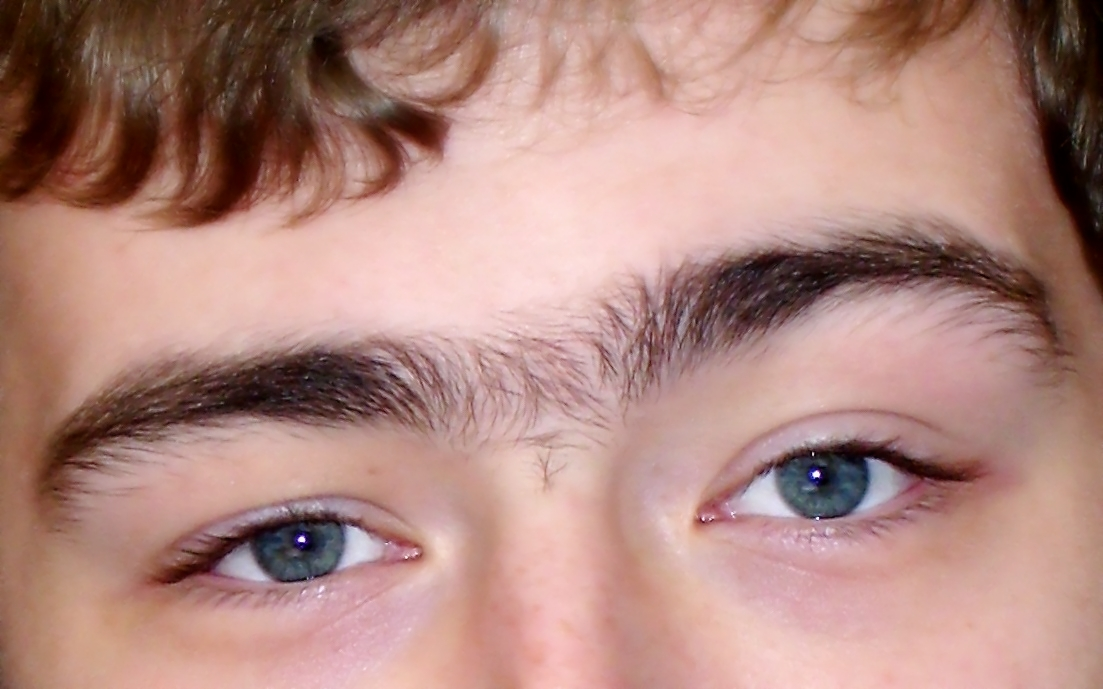
A young adult with hair between the eyebrows—a unibrow

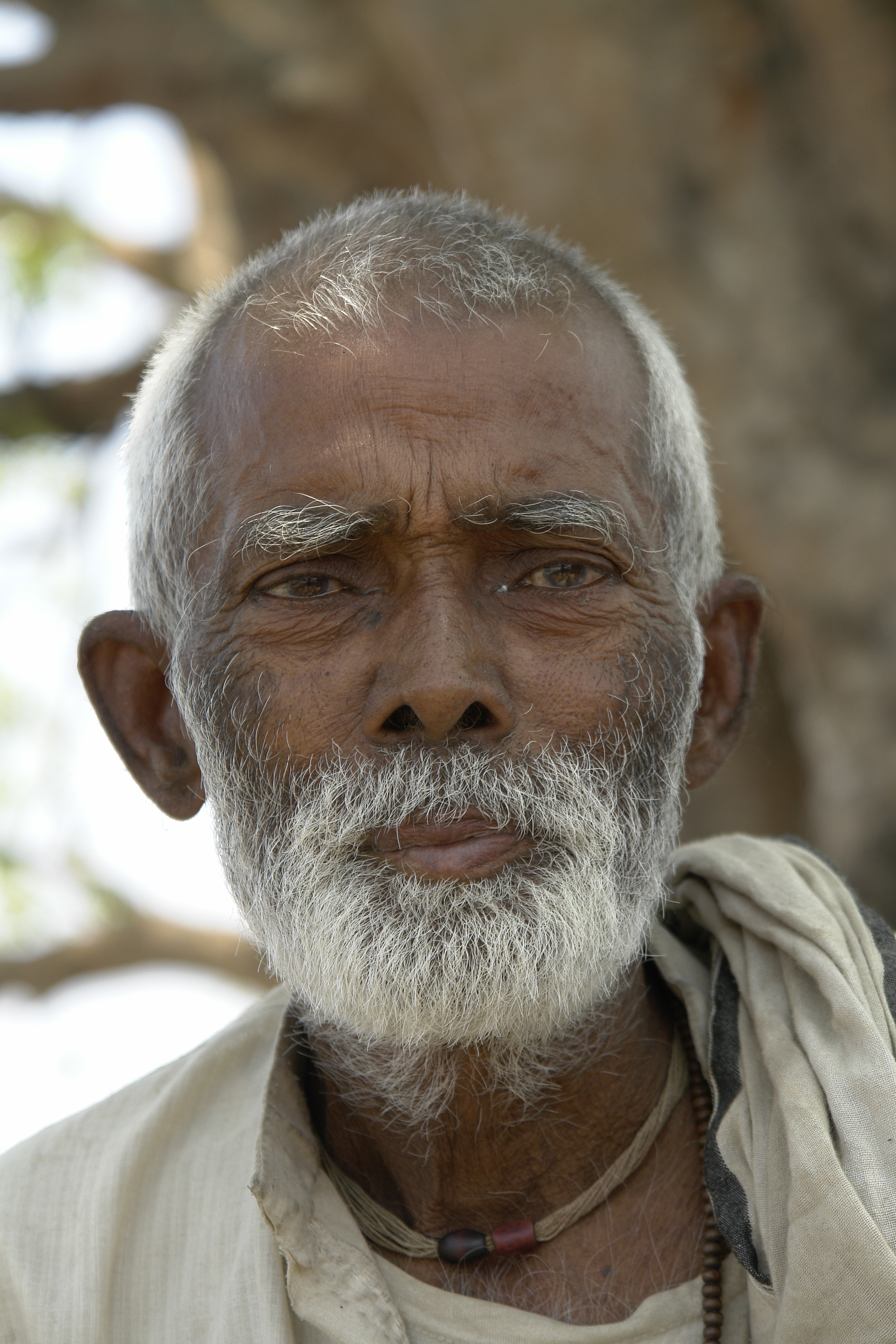
An elderly man with greying eyebrows.

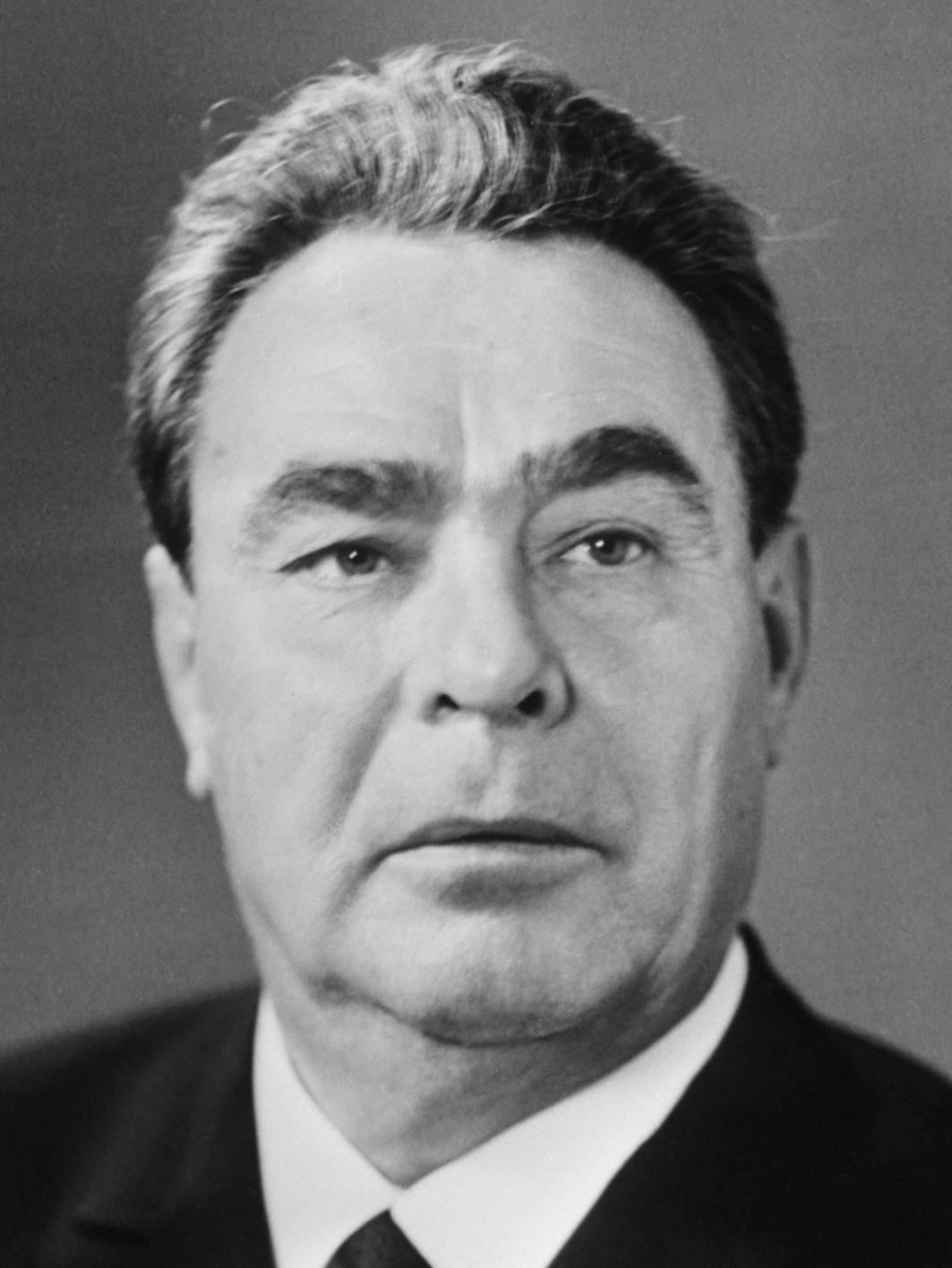
Soviet leader Leonid Brezhnev was recognised by his bushy eyebrows.

A boy with painted eyebrows.

== See also ==
- Anti-eyebrow, a body piercing placed below the eyebrow
- Eyebrow piercing, a body piercing done through the eyebrow
- Eyebrow restoration, surgical procedure to change the look of one's eyebrows
- Eyelashes, a set of hairs on the edges of the eyelids
