= Eyelash perm =

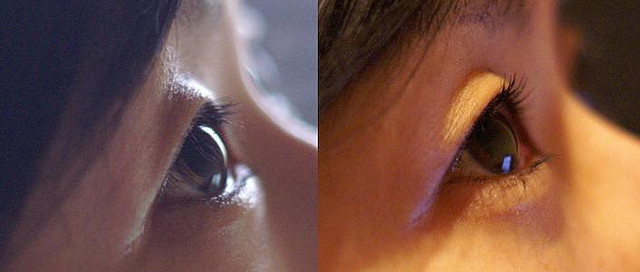
Eyelashes before (left) and after (right) a perm.

Eyelash permanent wave, or more commonly called an eyelash perm, and may also refer to permanent relaxer that straightens the hair is a cosmetics procedure performed only by licensed cosmetologists to flip up eyelashes using hair perming technology.

== Context ==
Lashes are treated with a perm solution and then followed by the neutralizer. Sometimes, depending on which system you use, a nourishing oil will be the last step to recondition and strengthen the lashes. Each step is left on for ten to fifteen minutes. Traditionally, when lash perming was introduced, a soft sponge in the shape of a rod would be placed at the base of the lashes to shape them. However, in recent years, people have started using silicone pads placed on the eyelids. There are small, medium, or large silicone pads depending on the natural length of the lashes and preference on degree of curl. This new style of perming lashes creates more of a natural shape and curve. The original way of perming lashes, still used today, gives a less natural curve or shape to the lash.

Another way to perm lashes is by using a plastic instrument that looks a lot like an eyelash curler. This plastic instrument is then placed at the base of your lashes and the instrument pinches them upwards, the way a lash curler would. It rests on your eye for support and the rest of the procedure is performed the same way you would with rods or silicone pads.

Once your lashes have been applied (by a special glue that does not harm the lashes) to the perm rod or silicone pad the perming solution is applied to the upturned lash, and then it is left to set for ten to fifteen minutes, followed by the neutralizer which is also left on for ten to fifteen minutes. In certain systems there will be a nourishing oil as the last step, this nourishing oil also helps to break up the glue that was used to place the lashes on the silicone pad, making it easier for the removal of the silicone pad. Once the silicone pad has been removed the eyelids and lashes are cleansed of any residue left over. The overall procedure takes about 30–45 minutes to perform.

The results may last for two to three months. The chemical reaction breaks and reforms the bonds of the hair. This reaction softens the lash's inner structure between the protein chains of the hair. The hair swells, stretches, and softens, and then is molded around the shape of the perm rod or silicone pad to form a curl.

The procedure is performed in a salon or spa by a trained, licensed, certified individual. Every state requires individuals performing the procedure to have a valid cosmetology license.

== History ==
Historically, to achieve an upturned look, lash curlers and mascara were used. The first eyelash curler was invented by the Kurlash company. An early alternative method for curling hair that was suitable for use on people was invented in 1905 by German hairdresser Charles Nessler. Eyelash perming developed as a widely available solution sometime after 2000.

== Considerations ==
Due to the chemicals involved, like any procedure, there is some risk. Side effects of the procedure have been known to include stinging around the eyes. There is also the possibility that they may damage the eyelashes. The U.S. Food and Drug Administration (FDA), while approving of hair treatment, has not yet approved the procedure for use around the eyes.

== See also ==
- False eyelashes
- U.S. Federal Food, Drug, and Cosmetic Act
- List of cosmetic ingredients
- Permanent makeup
- Society of Cosmetic Chemists

== Sources ==
- "Karl L. Nessler" (in German).
- Calvete, L.G., "Permanent Waving: The Golden Years", Publish and be damned, Toronto, Canada, 2007 |ISBN 1-897312-34-2
