= Japanese female beauty practices and ideals =

Japanese female beauty practices and ideals are a cultural set of standards in relevance to human physical appearance and aesthetics. Distinctive features of Japanese aesthetics have the following qualities: simplicity, elegance, suggestion, and symbolism. Concepts of female beauty originate from its traditional culture which has lasted for more than a century, some of which include long, straight black hair, pale white skin, and slim eyes. According to Kowner and Ogawa, the modern concept of physical attractiveness in Japan emanates from distinct, native traditions that have persisted for more than a century despite pervasive Western influence of values and ideals.

== Importance of female facial beauty ==
Facial beauty is important as human evolution begins with attraction and mate choice. Particularly for women, there have been benefits of physical attractiveness as it is often linked with increased economic mobility. For example, those who are attractive are seen to be confident with positive personality traits, able to pursue high-status occupations, and have happy and successful marriages.

However, Japanese women may take steps to make themselves conventionally unattractive, as Japanese men may be intimidated by women who are 'too beautiful'. One example of a modern beauty ideal among Japanese women is yaeba/八重歯 ("double tooth"), which is the state of having crooked fang-like teeth. In recent years it has become common for women to have their teeth surgically altered to emulate this condition. Although this practice is derided in the United States, where more than $100 billion is spent yearly to straighten and perfect the teeth of the citizens of that country, yaeba is considered endearing in Japanese women, as Japanese men are more likely to approach a woman who is "imperfect".

== History ==
=== Hakuhō (646–710) ===
The first form of white face powder was made out of rice flour and white soil during the Hakuhō period. The manufacture of this was imported from China. This was limited to the upper class until the Edo period (1600–1868) where it was used extensively by the public.

=== Nara (710–793) ===
During the Nara period, lips and eyelids were given a red tint, and red beauty spots were painted on the outer corners of the lips and eyes, as well as in between the eyebrows. Hikimayu, the removal of natural eyebrows and penciling in new ones was practiced primarily in the upper classes. This became a norm for every woman to represent their married status, and until the end of the 19th century this continued.

=== Heian (793–1185) ===
Teeth blackening during the Heian period, known as ohaguro, involved coating the teeth black with paint, mainly done by the wealthy. There are many suspected reasons Japanese people practiced teeth blackening. Some sources claim black teeth imitated tooth decay, and decay was a status symbol as only the wealthy could afford sweets. Other sources claim it was done purely for aesthetic reasons. However, most sources agree that it was a tradition carried out at marrying age to symbolize a woman’s maturity. This was used to sustain healthy teeth, as well as enhance sex appeal. Plump, round faced women were considered beautiful in this period, symbolising wealth as they were able to afford a lot of food. Straight, long black hair was also ideal. In essays written in 1002 called The Pillow Book, Sei Shōnagon, a court lady stated that she envied "beautiful, very long hair".

=== Kamakura (1180-1333) ===
As samurai rose to power in the Kamakura period, women warriors were also more prominent that is commonly believed. The onna-musha (female warriors) acquired skills in martial arts, archery, and horse riding since families fought together. Some sources say that warrior men and women dressed alike, and that their hairstyles were sometimes indistinguishable.

=== Edo (1600–1868) ===
Etiquette of how to use the cosmetics was important during the Edo period, with emphasis of the colours white, red and black. The use of white face powder and teeth blackening continued. Heavy red lipstick made out of safflowers became popular. Face steaming was thought to make the skin white and smooth, and sanekazura root juice was used to straighten hair. Light, proper use of makeup was ideal. The women of Osaka and Kyoto were ridiculed as they used heavier makeup than the women in Tokyo, considering them to be "yabo" (rough). Slim and fragile women with up turned eyes and narrow faces also began to be the ideal, shifting away from the preference of plumpness. Small hands and feet were also considered beautiful, therefore socks and rings were worn by women in their sleep to slow down the growth of their limbs.

=== Meiji (1868–1912) ===
After the Meiji Restoration in 1868, there was a westernisation of makeup techniques and clothing from the influence of the cultural exchange with the United States and Europe. Admiration of the white skin of westerners was sometimes recorded in the historical writings of Japanese visitors to the United States, however Japanese men were disheartened to see that white women had red hair and "dog-shaped" eyes, which they considered unattractive. The same Japanese male visitors described how they occasionally saw American women with "black hair and black eyes", who they figured were from "some Asian race", and therefore naturally more attractive than white women.

== White skin tone as a symbol of beauty ==
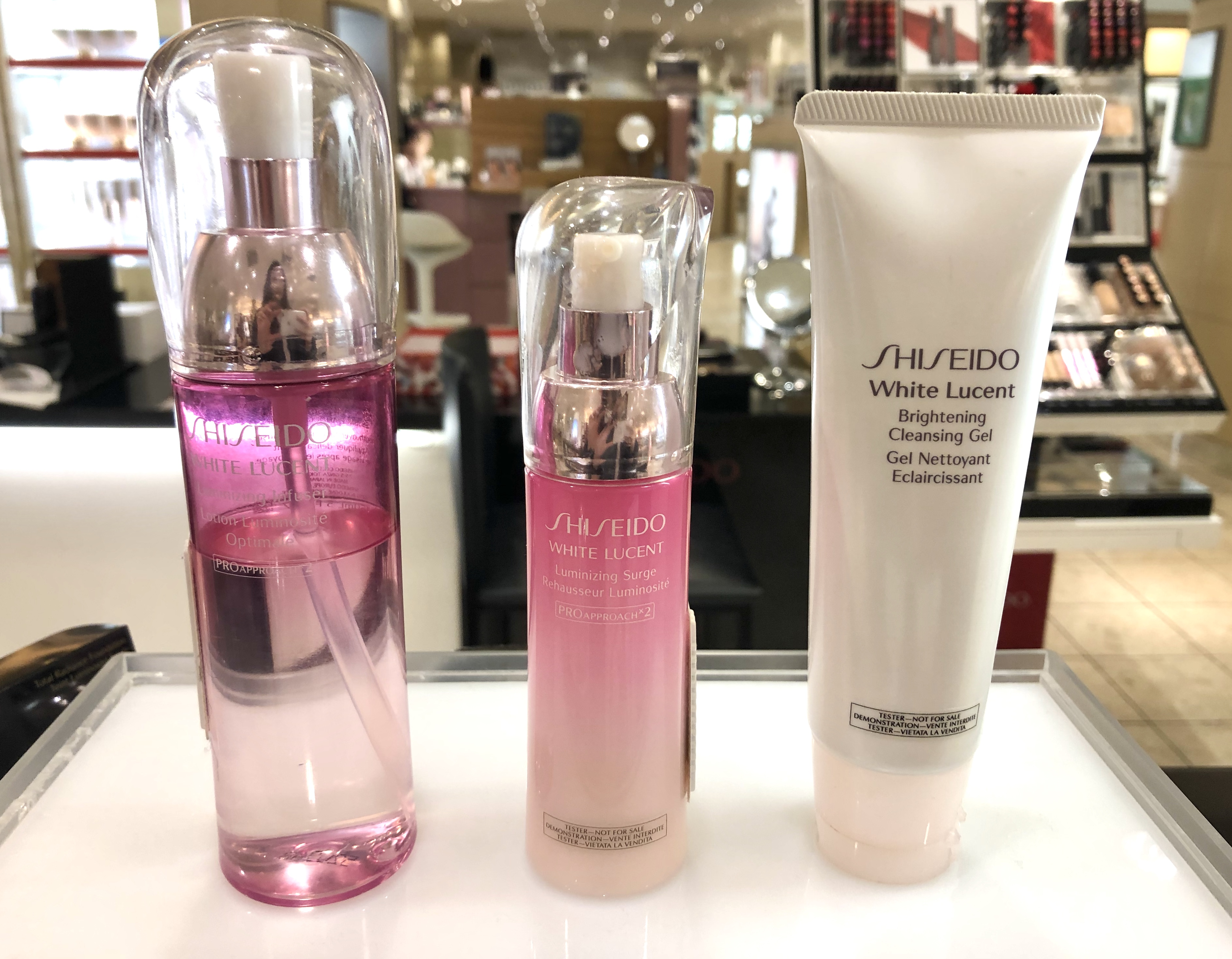
Shiseido's "White Lucent" skincare range, aimed at taking care of the skin while delivering whitening components

Since recorded time, white skin has been highly valued as an element of beauty. An old saying mentioned that "white skin makes up for seven defects", meaning that white skin can over shine the lack of other desired physical qualities. Light skin in Japan has connotations of national identity and "purity", as lighter skin is seen as "more Japanese".

However, the "white skin" notion in Japanese culture does not refer to the skin color of Caucasian women. The ideal female skin color in Japan would be considered "tan" in the West. According to Ashikari, there is a widepread perception in Japan that European women's skin is less beautiful than Japanese women's, as White women's skin is stereotyped as being too pale, reddish, and roughly textured.

The earliest to conduct research on this topic is by an anthropologist Hiroshi Wagatsuma. He argued in his 1967 article that there was a dichotomy in the 1960s of white vs. black with the preference of white heavily endorsed in aesthetic values. This preference is rooted in Japan's own tradition, simply for aesthetic preference rather than the influence of western culture. In the fieldwork conducted by Ashikari (2005), it was found that the same skin tone shared amongst the Japanese as a race is something they take pride in, and is often expressed to represent "Japaneseness".

== Double eyelids ==
In feudal Japan, as there was little influence from other countries, beautiful women in ukiyo-e were portrayed with slim eyes and single eyelids. During the opening of Japan to the West in the Meiji Restoration, Japanese physician M. Mikamo was the first surgeon to publish a technique for East Asian blepharoplasty, to westernise the Asian eyelid. The submissive femininity that was highly valued before was replaced by a new concept of liberated women. Japanese women admired the beauty of Westerners, and Mikamo considered these desires, and through his surgical efforts he opted to satisfy their claims in which he was successful. To only achieve westernisation was not the purpose of the surgery, it was to reduce the traditional Japanese look, which was considered too submissive, and to instead reflect the new liberated feminine beauty. Double eyelids did not automatically mean westernisation as fifty percent of Asians are born with double eyelids.

Often in Asian cosmetics shops there are eyelid glues and tapes to stick the top of the eyelid skin together to create the illusion of a double eyelid. These products are often advertised in girls magazines such as Popteen.

== Elimination of traditional practices ==
During the Meiji restoration there were aims of building a new modern economy, and the government also sought to modernise the appearance of the Japanese society. The Emperor's face was westernised to encourage the ban of whitening males faces, but to maintain the traditional values, women's faces were still whitened. In 1914, the government banned female eyebrow shaving in urban areas, as well as tooth blackening as it was thought to be barbaric by Western ideals. The ideals of beauty transformed from having slim eyes, painted thin eyebrows and slim faces to having larger eyes, rounder faces and thick eyebrows. Increasingly the younger generations have been seeing sun-tanned skin as an indication of wealth and privilege, as they are able to afford summer holidays overseas by the seaside.

The commercialisation of beauty and cosmetics are a strong influence to the Japanese aesthetic ideals. Some authors have also observed a sense of pan-Asian female identity in aesthetic ideals in cosmetic advertising, especially in the 21st century.

== Skincare ==
=== Anti-aging skin care ===
In the 19th century women over 35 were respected and praised as virtuous grandmothers, but were seemed as unattractive. By the start of the 20th century, older women were considered more beautiful, and the cosmetics industry had introduced anti-aging products such as creams, and practices of dyeing hair. This was fundamental in skin care brands as it assured women their youth could be restored, a highly valued beauty ideal. Japan was the largest non-western market for the demand of anti-aging products.

=== Hygienic skin culture ===
The Japanese perceptions of excessively whitening their skin was changed by two events. The first one was the Food and Drugs Standards Law in 1900, forbidding the use of lead-based makeup. The second was more information about the dangers of lead poisoning, contributing to anxieties of maintaining skin health. Traditional cosmetics were viewed as dangerous and the maintenance of clear pores became a serious aspect, especially due to the Nakamura Incident of 1887, where a kabuki actor was wearing heavy makeup on stage and then suffered from "skin suffocation".

Biganjutsu (the technique of the beautiful face) emerged as a practice that made caring for the skin as a basic hygiene. The average facial, available in urban areas involved putting a hot towel on the face to open up pores, massaging the face with cream, and lastly electrotherapeutic devices were used. This assured smooth, blemish and wrinkle-free skin without the need of having to over up with heavy makeup. The new beauty goal was to create a healthy complexion, radiating with "natural beauty".

=== Shiseido ===
Throughout the Taishō period (1912–1926), there was a further Westernisation in Japan, with flourishing amounts of western fashion in Ginza, the first shopping district in Tokyo. New cosmetics products that came from liberal ideas of scientists originated from Shiseido. Arinobu Fukuhara was an entrepreneur who opened the Shiseido pharmacy in Ginza in 1872, Japan's first western style pharmacy, distinctive from when the pharmacies only sold traditional Chinese medicine at the time. Shiseido's success emerged from the launch of a luxurious skin lotion called Eudermine in 1897. To create an emotional association, they used a non-Japanese name, from classical Greek terms meaning "good" and "skin". It was so successful that it is still continued to be sold today. The exotic motto "Richness in All" used by Shiseido accurately represented the time as it was when Japan was still new to western influences. In 1923, women were limited to only one shade of powder which was pure white, but Shiseido then produced powder of seven different shades of skin colour. This new range promoted that the natural skin colour was the beauty ideal, allowing women to match their own colour, expressing liberation and individuality of women.

== Make-up ==
=== The shift away from pure whiteness ===
Starting from the Heisei Period (1989–2019), natural, healthy and clear skin was the new standard of beauty, redeveloping the meaning of whiteness. The cosmetics industry introduced powders that were skin coloured, and not just pure white. Pure white also sometimes revealed signs of disease and was no longer considered as beautiful as it once was before. The new ideal of skin colour was nikutaibi, which implied health and is a balance between tan and white, a complexion of pink paleness. Healthy skin was highly important as it was seen to be associated with fertility potential, especially during the prewar period.

=== Natural make-up style ===
After the Equal Employment Opportunity Law (Japan) in 1985, the makeup style for women was heavy, emphasising their facial features by contouring, colouring in their eyebrows dark, and using deeper lip shades. This shifted towards a natural (lesser) style of makeup after the 2011 Tōhoku earthquake and tsunami, also known as the Great East Japan Earthquake. It was seen to express a softer beauty in a sensitive time of healing. This style has continued until today, with lesser makeup being preferred over both heavy makeup and no-makeup styles.

== See also ==
- Beauty
- Bijin
- Light skin in Japanese culture
- Whitewashing (beauty)
- Women in Japan
