= Riverside Cemetery (Rochester, New York) =

Cemetery in Rochester, New York, US

- Interactive map of Riverside Cemetery

Details
- Established: 1892
- Location: Rochester, New York
- Country: US
- Coordinates: 43°13′05″N 77°37′33″W
- Type: public
- Owned by: City of Rochester
- Size: 123 acres (50 ha)
- No. of graves: 250,000
- Website: Riverside and Mount Hope Cemeteries
- Find a Grave: Riverside Cemetery
- The Political Graveyard: Riverside Cemetery

Riverside Cemetery in Rochester, Monroe County, New York, United States, was founded in 1892 to serve the growing population in the northern part of the city. Situated on 123 acres (498,000 m²) (0.2 square miles) of land between Lake Avenue and the Genesee River, the cemetery is the permanent resting place of over 250,000 people. Since 1942, the cemetery has been owned and operated by the City of Rochester.

== Notable burials ==
- Giuseppe Aiello, organized crime leader
- William Joseph Beldue, inventor of the eyelash curler
- Virgil Warden Finlay, renowned illustrator of science-fiction and fantasy during the Pulp Era
- Kate Gleason, engineer and businesswoman
- Martha Matilda Harper, businesswoman, inventor
- Harold C. Mitchell, lawyer and New York State Assemblyman
- Lee Morse, jazz musician and singer from Oregon
- Allen J. Oliver, New York State Senator
- George F. Rogers, New York State Senator
- Blanche Scott, woman aviator
- Robert Wilcox, actor

Riverside's Section O is the resting place of American military veterans of the American Civil War and World War I.
