= Shu Uemura =

Japanese businessman

Uemura holding a Kabuki brush

Shu Uemura (植村 秀, Uemura Shū; June 19, 1928 – December 29, 2007) (Japanese pronunciation: [ɯemɯɾa ɕɯː]) was a Japanese make-up artist and founder of the cosmetics line which bears his name.

== Career ==
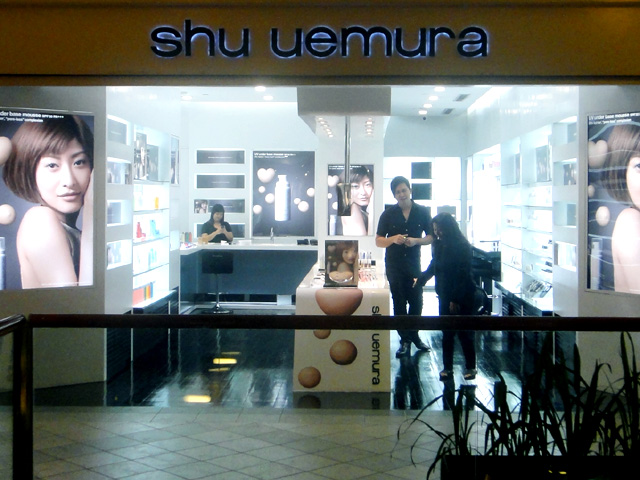
Shu Uemura Store at Rockwell Center, Makati, Philippines

A native of Tokyo, Shu Uemura reportedly first became interested in hairstyling and make up as a teenager while recovering from a severe illness which left him bedridden. He enrolled at the Tokyo Beauty Academy, becoming the only male student in a class of 130 pupils.

His first experience in film make-up occurred during the filming of 1957's Joe Butterfly, which was partially shot in Japan. Uemura left Japan in the late 1950s to try to break into the film and television make-up business.

Uemura's big break came on the set of the 1962 film, My Geisha. The film's regular make up artist fell ill and Uemura, who was working as a Hollywood beautician at the time, was called in to fill in for the sick artist. Uemura gained critical acclaim for transforming actress Shirley MacLaine into a Japanese woman. He received praise from both My Geisha's filmmakers and its cast, including MacLaine. He soon became one of Hollywood's favorite artists. He began working with well-known Hollywood personalities, usually as a make-up artist apprentice, including Edward G. Robinson, Frank Sinatra, and Lucille Ball. Among his notable early work was on Frank Sinatra's 1965 film, None but the Brave.

Uemura developed and launched his first cosmetics product in 1960. His product was a cleansing oil, which left the skin cleaner than soap and also acted as a moisturizer. His cleansing oil remains popular in Japan today. Uemura developed a make-up philosophy that the health of his customers' skin should be the most important aspect of cosmetics. He also believed in enhancing a subject's natural beauty, not artificially creating it using cosmetic products.

Uemura returned to Japan in 1964 and opened the Shu Uemura makeup school, which taught make-up techniques which he learned in Hollywood. He founded a cosmetics company called Japan Makeup in 1967 and opened its first boutique store in Tokyo's trendy Omotesando district. He officially changed the name of his company to Shu Uemura Cosmetics in 1983. Uemura's company was able to take advantage of Japan's booming economy and taste for Western products during the 1980s. In the process, Shu Uemura Cosmetics became a major force in the domestic Japanese and international beauty market.

Shu Uemura sold his controlling interest in his company to French cosmetics maker L'Oréal in 2004 for an undisclosed amount of money. However, he remained the creative force behind Shu Uemura Cosmetics after the sale. It was estimated that as of early 2008, Shu Uemura Cosmetics made approximately $100 million a year in global sales at its stores worldwide. At the time of his death, the company had stores in Paris, New York City, London and Hong Kong, as well as outlets throughout Japan. The company's product line has expanded over the years to include hair and lifestyle products, perfume, fake eyelashes and handmade makeup brushes. In the process, the Uemura's company became a cultural force in some circles. Shu Uemura's eyelash curlers were even mentioned in the 2006 film, The Devil Wears Prada.

Uemura personally demonstrated his make-up techniques to the public twice a year. He used these demonstrations to introduce his customers to his last Mode Makeup lines. These demonstrations usually took place in Tokyo, London or New York City.

== Death ==
Shu Uemura died of pneumonia in Tokyo on December 29, 2007. He was 79 years old and was survived by his wife and son, Hiroshi who founded his own cosmetics line, UTOWA, in 2002. Uemura's funeral was held on January 4, 2008.
