= William Beldue =

American inventor (1889–1955)

William Joseph Beldue
- Born: September 9, 1889; Gates, New York, US
- Died: September 28, 1955 (age 66); Greece, New York, US
- Occupation: Inventor

William Joseph Beldue (September 9, 1889 – September 28, 1955) was the American inventor of the eyelash curler.

== Invention ==
Beldue invented the eyelash curler while working at the Kurlash Company at 77 South Avenue in Rochester, New York. He and his colleague, William R. Tuttle, co-held several patents with the company. Patents issued at least in part to Beldue include:

- Great Britain No. 581,055, Improvements in eyelash curlers, August 11, 1944
- U.S. No. 2,391,047, Eyelash curler, December 18, 1945
- U.S. No. 2,460,317, Eyelash curler, February 1, 1949
- Canada No. 456189, EYELASH CURLER, April 26, 1949
- U.S. No. 2,474,873, Eyelash curler, July 5, 1949
- Great Britain No. 689,019, Improvements in eyelash curlers, December 18, 1951
- U.S. No. 2,602,458, Eyelash curler, July 18, 1952
- Canada No. 493071, EYELASH CURLERS, May 26, 1953
- Canada No. 493219, EYELASH CURLER, May 26, 1953

== Personal life ==
Beldue had three sons, William Jr., Harold W., and Donald, and a daughter, Kathern. born November 17, 1929.

== Death ==
William Beldue died in Rochester, New York and is buried in Riverside Cemetery.
