= False eyelashes =

Cosmetic application

False eyelashes are a cosmetic enhancement attaching synthetic or natural fibers to the eyelids to give the natural eyelashes a fuller, more dramatic look. They are available in various lengths, thicknesses, and curvatures.

== History ==
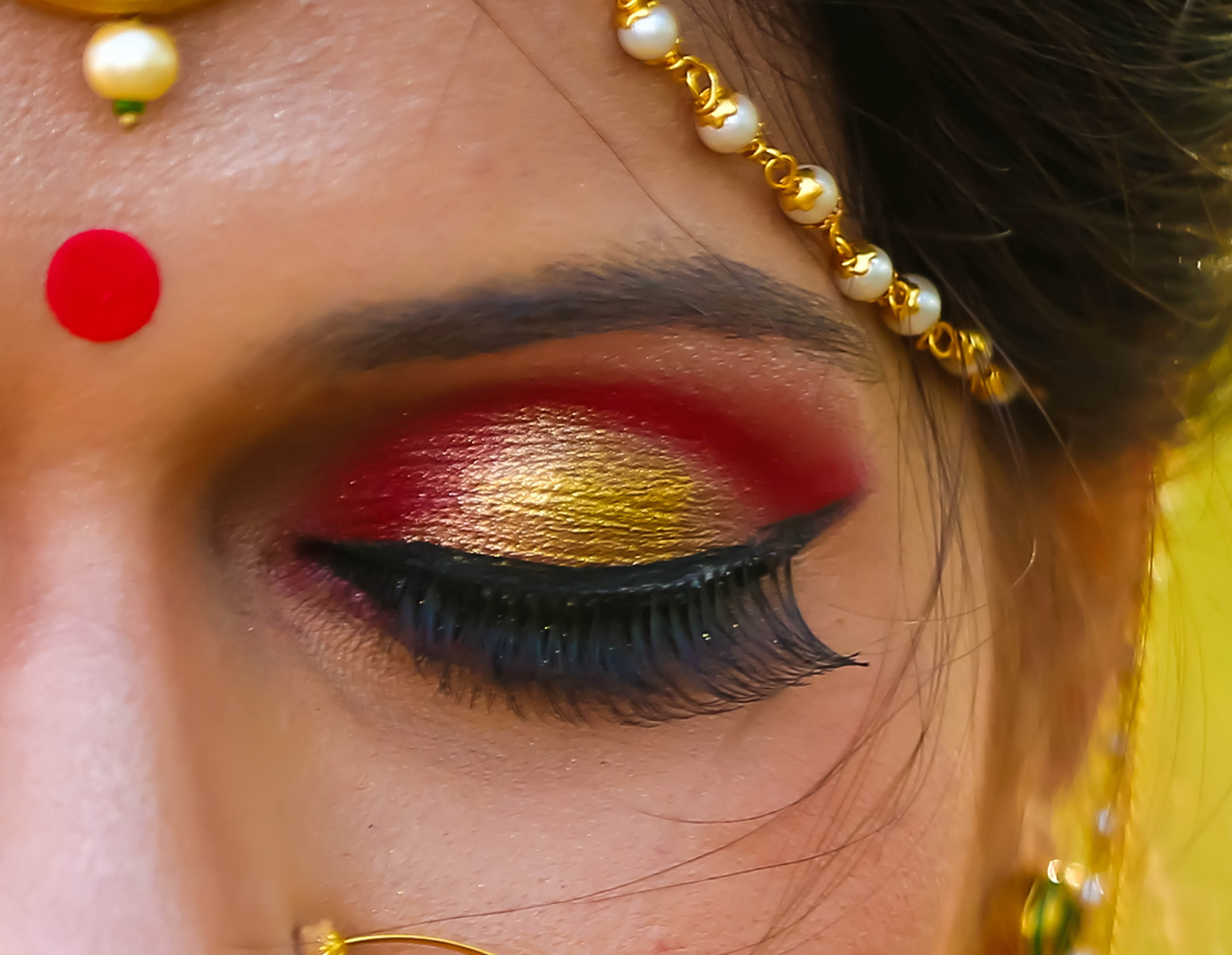
Bride wearing false eyelashes

In 1882, Henry Labouchère, of the British periodical Truth, reported: "Parisians have found out how to make false eyelashes [by having hair sewn into the eyelids]". A similar report appeared in the July 6, 1899, edition of The Dundee Courier, which described the painful method for elongating the lashes, under the headline "Irresistible Eyes May Be Had by Transplanting the Hair": the article explained how the procedure achieved longer lashes by having hair from the head sewn into the eyelids.

In 1902, Karl Nessler, a German-born hair specialist and inventor, patented "A New or Improved Method of and Means for the Manufacture of Artificial Eyebrows, Eyelashes and the like" in the United Kingdom. By 1903, he began selling artificial eyelashes at his London salon on Great Castle Street. He used the profits from his sales to fund his next invention, the permanent wave (perm) machine. In 1911, Anna Taylor, a Canadian, patented false eyelashes in the United States. Taylor's false eyelashes had a crescent-shaped strip of fabric bearing tiny pieces of hair. Another inventor of false eyelashes is Maksymilian Faktorowicz, a Polish beauty guru and businessman, who founded the company Max Factor.

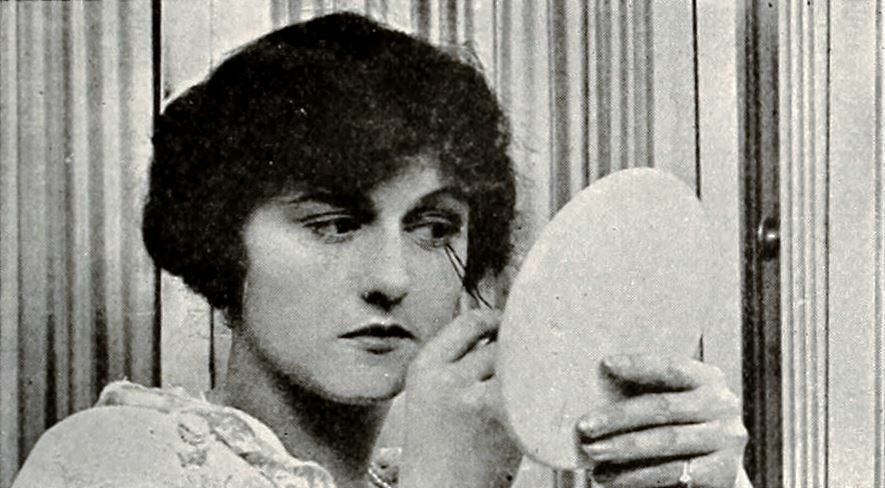
Peggy Hyland applying false eyelashes in Film Fun (1917)

In 1916, while making his film Intolerance, D. W. Griffith felt his actress, Seena Owen, was missing something. Griffith wanted her eyes to be twice as large and "supernatural". He then spoke to his wigmaker to create false lashes. They were made of human hair, which was then fixed to her eyelashes by spirit gum. One day, Owen showed up with her eyes swollen nearly shut, her co-star Lillian Gish wrote in her memoir.

False eyelashes became popular in the early 1930s. They were featured in Vogue.

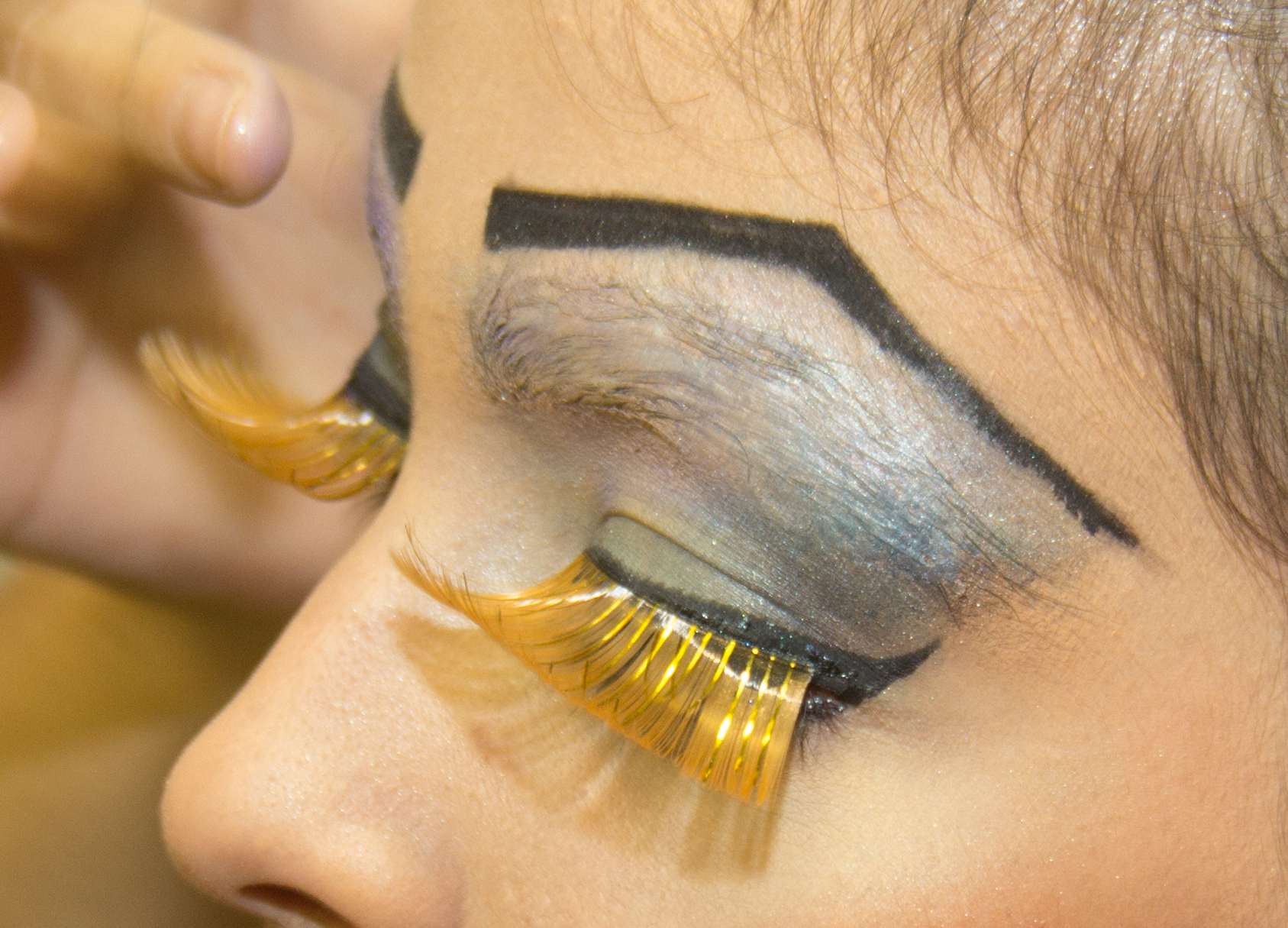
Person wearing synthetic false eyelashes as drag makeup

In the 1960s, eye makeup that made the eyes seem larger was very common. This look was achieved by applying false eyelashes to the top and bottom eyelids to mimic the look of a doll. Twiggy advanced the trend. In 1968, at the feminist Miss America protest, protestors symbolically threw a number of symbolic feminine products into a "Freedom Trash Can", including false eyelashes.

In 2014, Katy Stoka, founder of One Two Cosmetics, invented magnetic false eyelashes as an alternative to those affixed with glue.

== Temporary false lashes ==
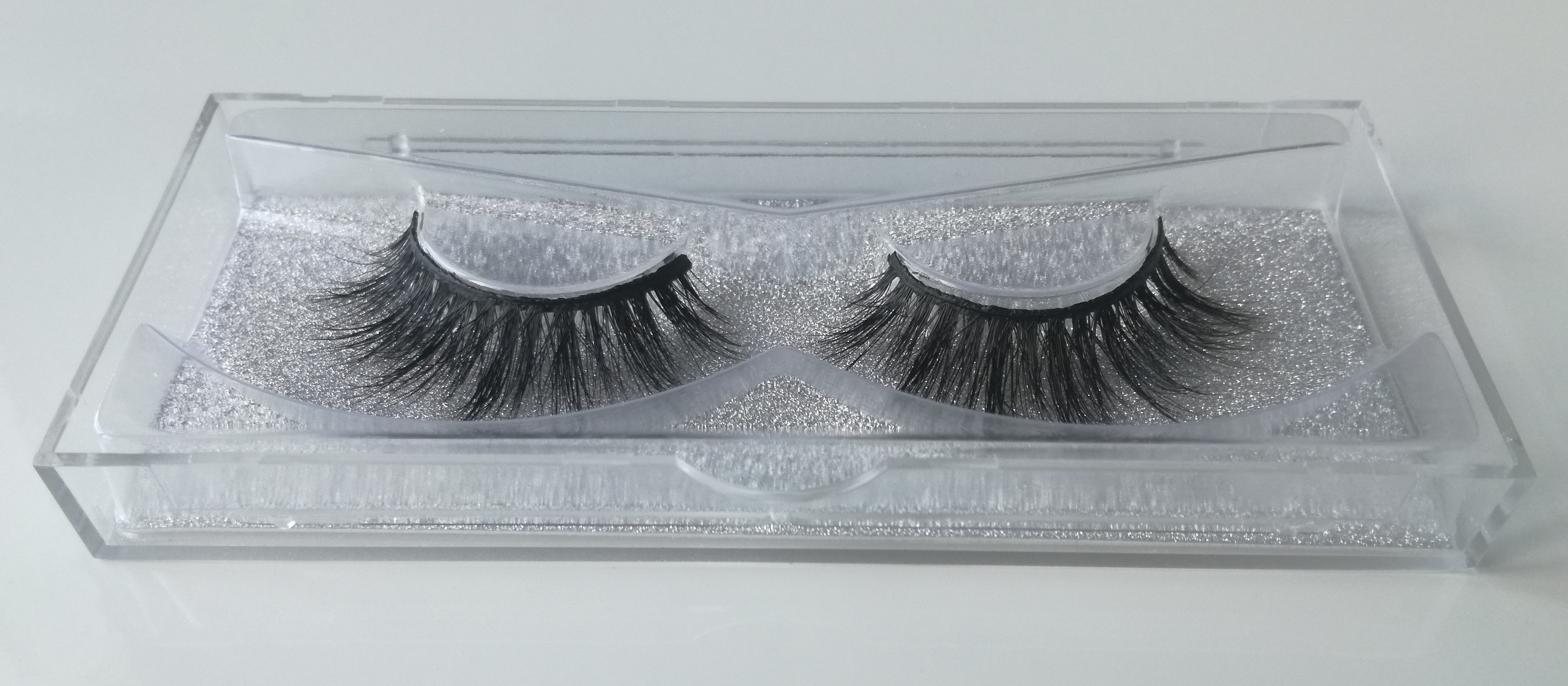
False eyelashes in packaging

Temporary false lashes are synthetic lashes that come in strips. These lashes are universal and made to fit all eye shapes. They can be trimmed to fit the width of the eyelid. These lashes are then adhered to the eyelid just above the natural lashes with temporary glue. Since the adhesive is made to be temporary, the false lashes can easily be removed with warm water or eye makeup remover. They are designed not to be worn when showering, sleeping or swimming.

Magnetic lashes are used by a thin strip of magnets attached to the strip lash. They work by placing the magnetic false lash between one's eyelashes, thereby sandwiching the natural eyelashes with magnetic eyelashes. These lashes are affordable and reusable but there is a potential risk— due to the magnets that are attached to the lashes it is possible that they may be a hazard to a patient if being used in an MRI scanning room.

== Eyelash extensions ==
Eyelash extensions are individual lashes that are applied to the natural lash using semi-permanent glue. These lashes are usually applied by a technician, and the process can take up to two hours. They can last anywhere from three to four weeks, depending on the care and maintenance of the lashes.

Lash extensions are more versatile than false lashes. The technician who is placing the lashes can cater to the specific client by customizing the lash extensions specifically to that client. They take into consideration the eye shape, the eyelids, as well as the state of the natural lash. Once these factors are evaluated the client and the technician can pick the material, length, color, and curvature of the lashes that best suits them.

Overall, lash extensions can also be classified into different styles. There is a classic set, which is the most natural form of lashes, as well as a volume set, which is considered the fullest style. In between these two styles is a hybrid set, which is a combination of a classic and a volume.

In the United States, each state regulates eyelash extensions. Some states require either a cosmetology or esthetician license; some states have a certificate or license specifically for lash technicians.

In the United Kingdom, the Guild of Professional Beauty Therapists accredits courses for the safe application of semi-permanent individual eyelash extensions. The value of the course content can be judged by the number of CPD (Continued Professional Development) points that the course is awarded.

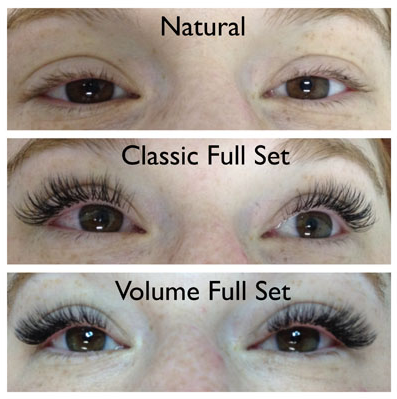
Eyelash extensions

== See also ==
- Eyelash curler
- Eyelash perm
