= Trichomegaly =

- Other names: Movie lashes
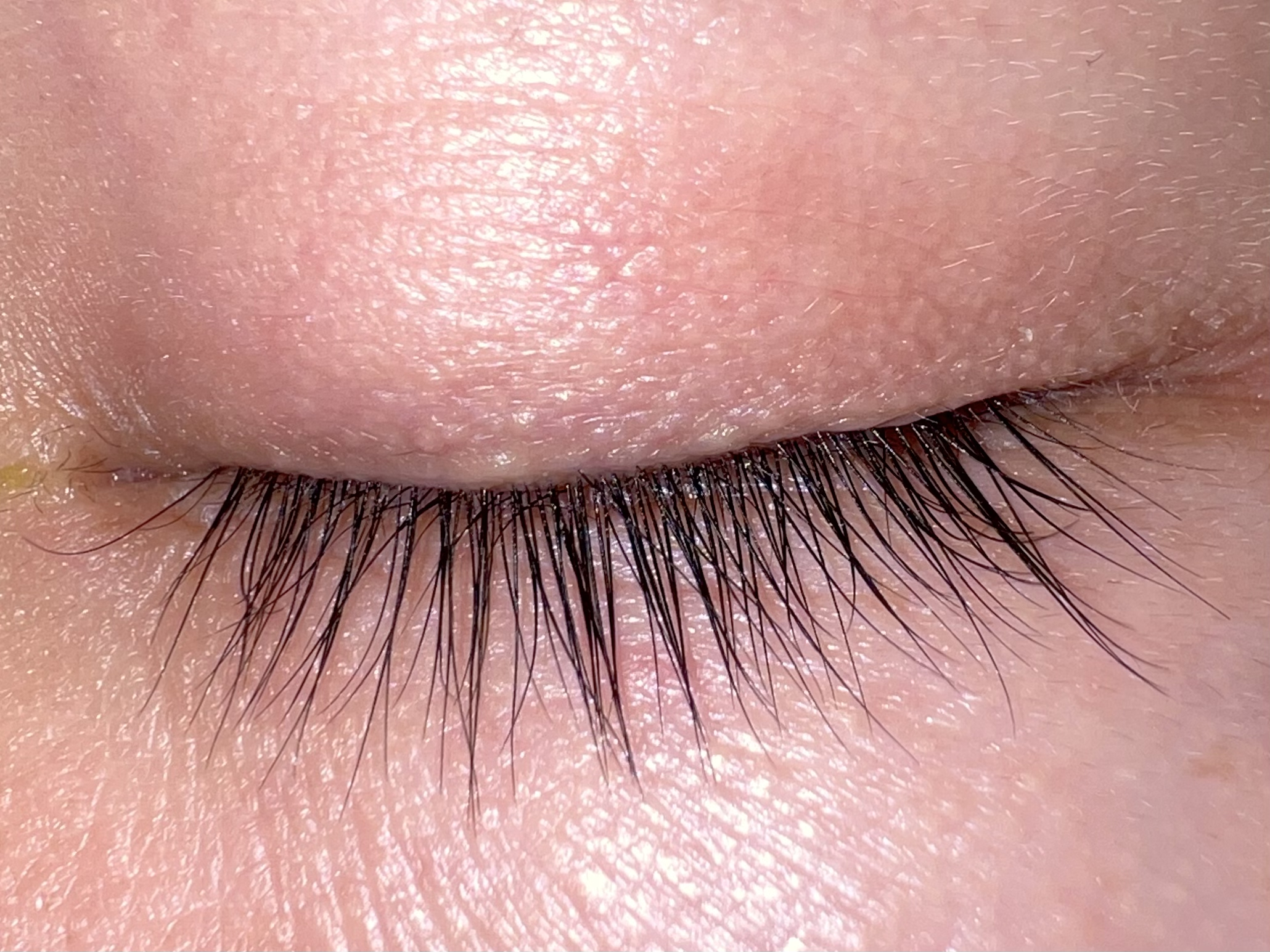
- Trichomegaly in an adult human male, his upper lashes measuring 14 mm long
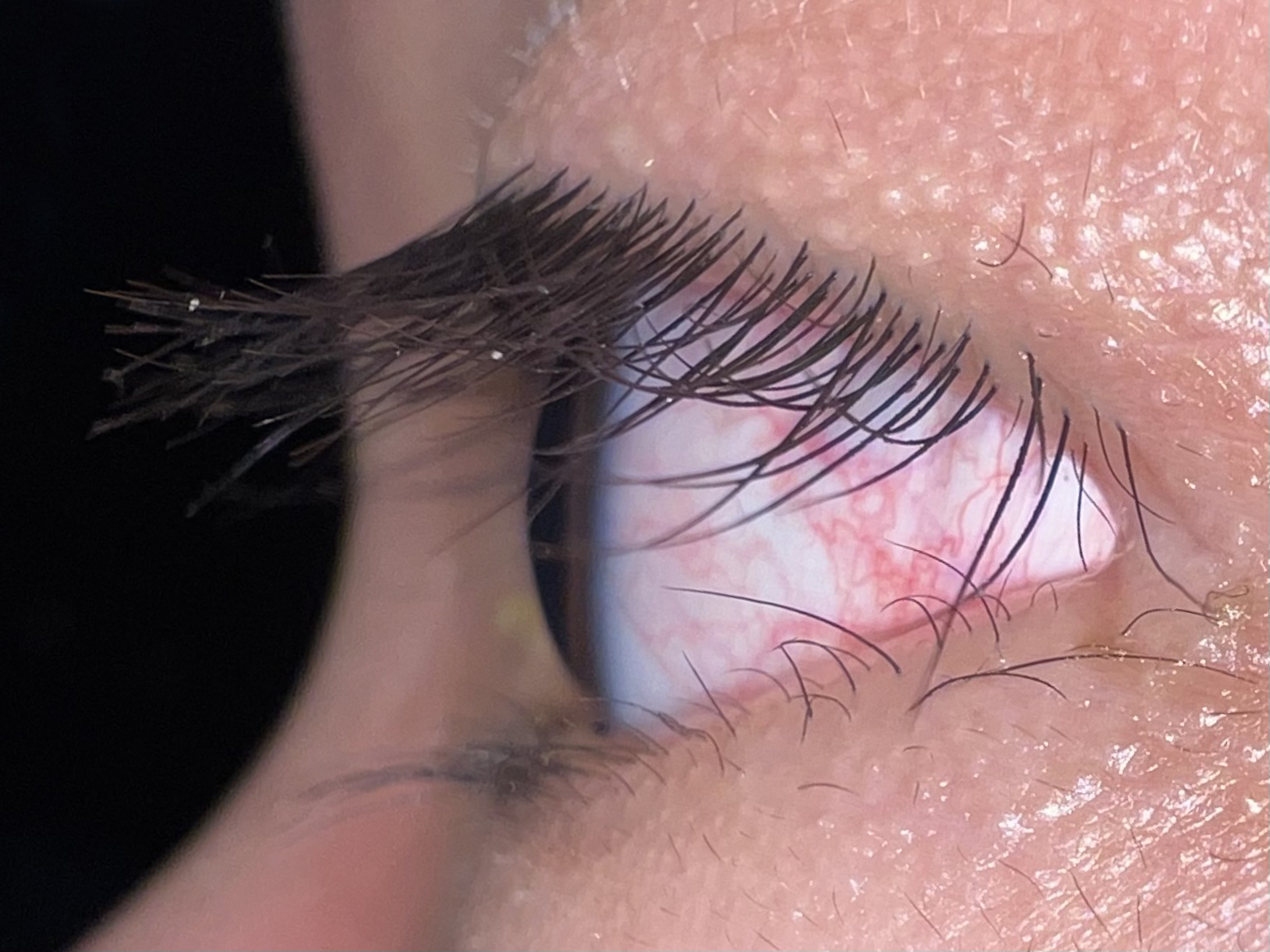
- Lashes that have greater prominence (length, fullness, darkness) than normal subjects
- Specialty: Dermatology
- Diagnostic method: Measured upper eyelash length of 12 mm or greater, and/or increased length, thickness, curl, pigmentation of lashes

Trichomegaly is a condition in which the eyelashes are abnormally long, objectively defined as 12mm or greater in the central area and 8mm in the peripheral. The term was first used by H. Gray in 1944 in a publication in the Stanford Medical Bulletin, though he was only the third person to characterize the disorder; the first two reports were published in German in 1926 and 1931 by Reiter and Bab, respectively. Gray suggested the use of the term "movie lashes" to describe this condition, for long lashes were at the time being portrayed in film as a desirable characteristic in women.

The condition does not always present a medical issue and can sometimes be a benign familial or isolated trait. The presence of excessively long or lush lashes in healthy individuals is likely under-reported as it is an aesthetically pleasing facial feature and usually does not prompt diagnosis or treatment on its own.

== Etiology ==
There are several causal agents for this disorder; these can be divided into three main categories and include the following:

=== Congenital Syndromes ===
- Oliver–McFarlane syndrome
- Cornelia de Lange Syndrome
- Cone-rod dystrophy
- Tetralogy of Fallot
- Hermansky–Pudlak syndrome
- Goldstein Hutt Syndrome
- Phylloid hypomelanosis
- Smith-Lemli-Opitz Syndrome

=== Acquired disorders ===
- Areata alopecia
- Connective tissue disorders, such as
  - Lupus
  - Dermatomyositis
  - Hen fever
  - Atopic dermatitis
- HIV/AIDS
- Renal metastatic Adenocarcinoma
- Eating disorders, such as Anorexia nervosa
- Pregnancy

=== Drugs ===
- Prostaglandin analogues
- Cetuximab
- Bimatoprost, Latanoprost
- Phenytoin
- Minoxidil
- Ciclosporin
- Topiramate
- Streptomycin
- Systemic corticosteroids
- Penicillamine

== Diagnosis ==
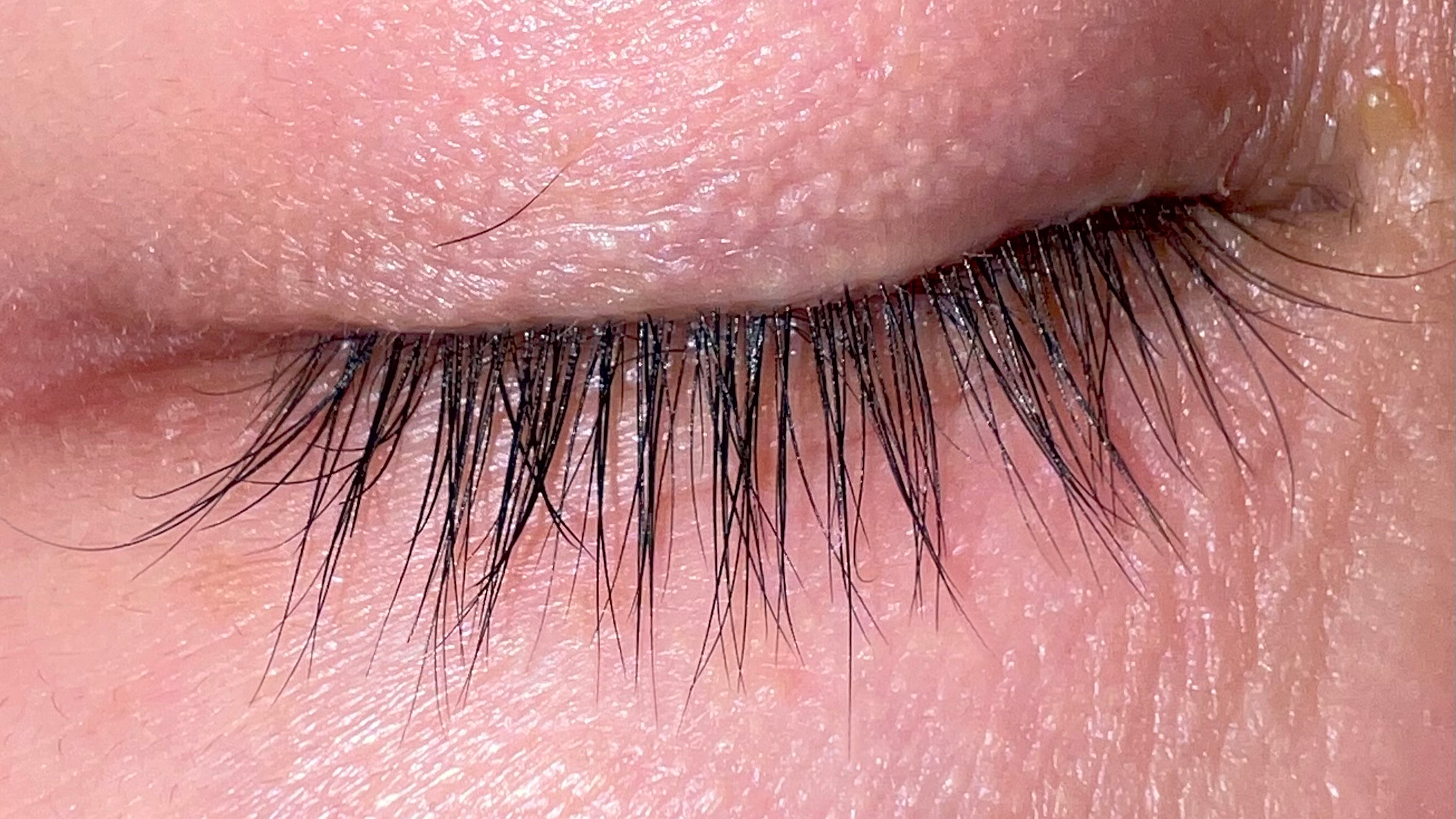
Eyelash trichomegaly (14mm long), but also increased thickness and pigmentation.

The objective definition of eyelash trichomegaly is having lashes which measure 12 mm or longer. However, lashes displaying increased curl, pigmentation, and thickness have also been included in the diagnosis of the condition.

== See also ==
- Trichomycosis axillaris
- List of cutaneous conditions
