= Martha Matilda Harper =

Canadian-American entrepreneur

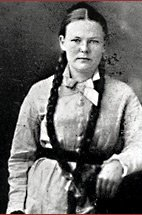
- Born: September 10, 1857; Oakville, Ontario, Province of Canada
- Died: August 3, 1950 (aged 92); Rochester, New York, U.S.
- Occupation(s): Businesswoman, entrepreneur, and inventor

Martha Matilda Harper (September 10, 1857 – August 3, 1950) was an American businesswoman, entrepreneur, and inventor who launched modern retail franchising and then built an international network of 500 franchised hair salons that emphasized healthy hair care. Born in Canada, Harper was sent away by her father when she was seven to work as a domestic servant. She worked in that profession for 25 years before she saved enough money to start working full-time producing a hair tonic she invented. The product, and the creation of special hair salons that utilized it, was successful. Harper began franchising the salon model to low-income women, and by its peak the company included more than 500 franchises and an entire line of hair care products.

== Early years ==
Martha Matilda Harper was born in Oakville, Ontario, Canada, on September 10, 1857. Her date of birth is sometimes disputed because she also used the year 1868 on occasion to reportedly make herself seem younger. However, she is said to have sworn in an affidavit that her true birth year was 1857. Her parents were Robert and Beadie Harper. She received little formal education as a child. Harper's father sent her away at age seven to become a domestic servant for relatives in Orono, Ontario. She worked in that profession for 22 years before moving to the United States to work as a servant in Rochester, New York. Her last Canadian employer, a physician, imparted his knowledge of hair health to her, and bequeathed her his hair tonic formula when he died. She learned to respect scientific principles from the physician which benefitted her while making the hair tonic. While a servant, Harper developed her own hair tonic after becoming concerned that the hair products on the market did more harm than good. She saved enough money to begin producing the hair tonic full-time, and, upon leaving domestic service three years after her immigration to the United States, opened the first public hair salon in the region in order to help market it. Her salon opened in 1888 in Rochester using her life savings of $360.

== Company ==
Harper's salon, the Harper Method Hair Parlour, and many of her innovations underlie the modern concept of the hair salon. Before Harper, hairdressers used to make home visits. She used her hair tonic on herself to advertise. Her floor-length hair also served as an effective marketing tool and appeared in many advertisements for her products. She hired former servants to staff her salon. In 1891, at the urging of Bertha Palmer of the Palmer House fame, Harper became the first to start modern retail franchising, allowing franchisees to open salons under the Harper name. Her first franchise was in Buffalo, New York. Palmer wanted Harper to open her unique hair salon in Chicago in 1893 in time for the Columbian Exposition in Chicago, which Harper did.

Each salon was owned by a woman; the first 100 shops only went to poor women like Harper. She trained the franchisees and inspect their salons to ensure quality.

Emphasizing customer service and comfort, Harper invented reclining shampoo chairs, which became a common feature of salons worldwide. The salons offered scalp massage and child care, and they provided evening hours. The hair products her company produced were intended to be healthier than those widely available at the time and were made largely with natural products. Harper salons did not carry synthetic dyes or do chemical perms.

=== Famous clientele ===
At the height of its success, her company had 500 franchises and produced a full line of hair care and beauty products. Among the Harper customers were British royalty, Susan B. Anthony, Woodrow Wilson, Grace Coolidge, Joseph P. Kennedy, Rose Kennedy, Jacqueline Kennedy, George Bernard Shaw, and Ladybird Johnson.

=== Company legacy ===
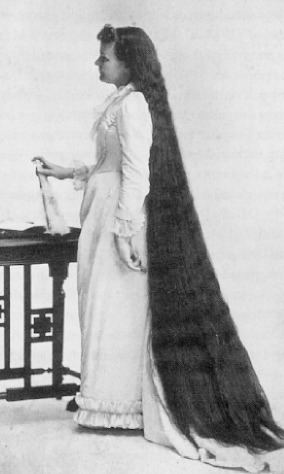
Harper's own hair was the greatest advertisement for her products and services. This iconic image, and others in a similar pose, appeared in much of her early advertising.

In 1920, at the age of 63, Harper married Robert McBain, a 39 year old army officer. They ran the company together for 15 years until Harper retired at the age of 78 and gave control of the company to McBain.

The Harper Method Inc. has operated under a variety of different owners. In June 1956, Robert McBain, Harper's husband, sold the enterprise to Earl Freese and Gerald Wunderlich who then made three different attempts to sell the business throughout the 1960s and 70s.

In 1971, Robert Prentices, then manager of the Harper manufacturing centre in St. Catharine's, Ontario, purchased the factory assets along with Harper manufacturing and distribution rights, renaming the company Niagara Mist Marketing Ltd, also known as the Soap Factory.

On March 10, 1972, other Harper Method Inc., assets were bought by PEJ Beauty Corporation, a wholly owned subsidiary of the Wilfred Academy. At the time, PEJ was one of the largest operators of trade schools in America. According to Philip Jakeway, then President of the Wilfred Academy, he hoped to expand his operation by marketing the Harper products and shops. An agreement was reached whereby Prentice would supply Harper products to Jakeway for U.S. distribution. Jakeway was unsuccessful."

The last Harper Method franchise shop operated in Rochester, New York, as the country's oldest, and longest-running, beauty shop until the early 2000s. It was owned by a woman named Centa Sailer who died in 2014. The site of Harper's former laboratory is now a tire warehouse.

== Personal life ==
Harper liked cooking, travel and golf. She was a Christian Scientist and a member of First Church of Christ, Scientist, Rochester, New York.

Harper was the first woman member of the Rochester Chamber of Commerce. She was a member of the Rochester Country Club and Oak Hill Country Club. She also studied at the University of Rochester for a few classes.

== Death and legacy ==
Harper died in Rochester, New York, on August 3, 1950, one month short of her 93rd birthday, survived by her husband Robert MacBain, who died on April 30, 1965, at the age of 83. At time of her death there were over 350 shops. Her gravesite is at Riverside Cemetery, in Rochester, New York. She was interred on August 7, 1950, under the name Martha H. McBain. Lot, No. PART 427-J.

In 2001, Harper was posthumously honored with the Bonny LeVine Award by the International Franchise Association which recognizes women leaders in franchising who have placed an intentional focus on growing and mentoring future leaders. In 2003, Harper was inducted into the National Women's Hall of Fame for her achievements in business. She is considered remarkable for helping other servants live the American dream by hiring them as staff and allowing them to become franchisees.

A documentary about Harper, The Marvelous Martha, premiered in 2022 at the Rochester Museum and Science Center, where many of Harper's artifacts are preserved.

== In popular culture ==
A young adult book, Martha the Hairpreneur: From Servant to Business Empress, and Martha's Magical Hair, a children's picture book, have been written about Harper.

Tara Rosling portrays Harper in "In the Company of Women" (February 17, 2020), episode 16 of season 13 of the Canadian television period drama Murdoch Mysteries.
