= Kate Gleason =

American engineer and businesswoman (1865–1933)

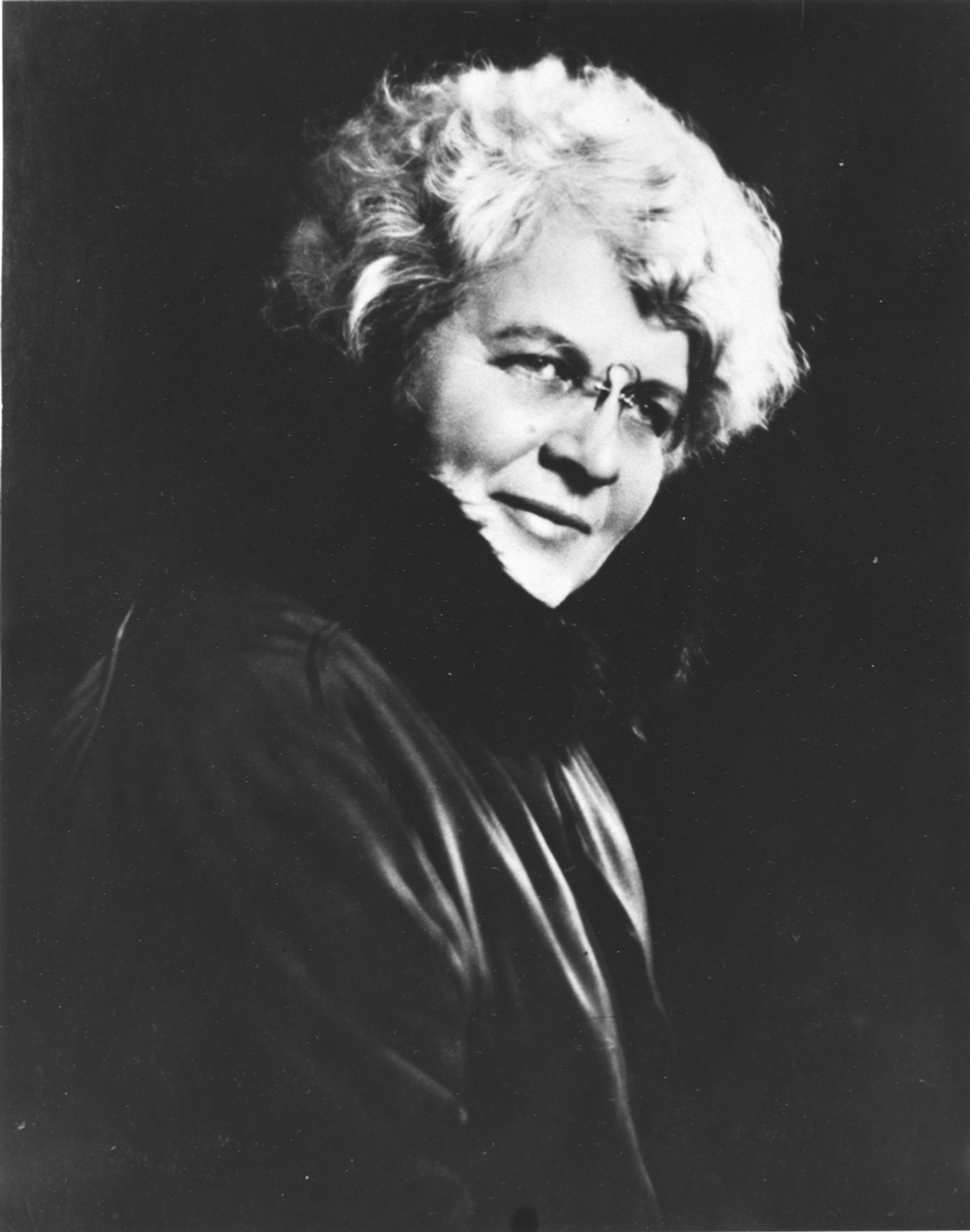
- Gleason circa 1890–1910
- Born: Catherine Anselm Gleason; November 24, 1865 (Note: Biographer Janis Gleason claims Kate Gleason was born on November 24. Gleason's obituary in The New York Times gives November 24 as her birth date while her obituary in the Rochester Times-Union gives November 25.); Rochester, New York, US
- Died: January 9, 1933 (aged 67); Rochester, New York, US
- Resting place: Rochester Riverside Cemetery
- Education: Cornell University
- Occupations: Engineer, businesswoman

Catherine Anselm Gleason (November 24, 1865 – January 9, 1933) was an American engineer and businesswoman known for her accomplishments in the field of engineering and for her philanthropy. Starting at a young age, she managed several roles in the family-owned Gleason Works in Rochester, New York, and later used her experience to launch a successful career in finance and construction. Through a combination of formal education and work experience with the Gleason Works, she earned recognition as an engineer and was elected to the American Society of Mechanical Engineers in 1914 as their first woman member. Gleason is the namesake of the Kate Gleason College of Engineering at the Rochester Institute of Technology.

== Early life and education ==
Catherine Anselm Gleason was born on November 24, 1865, in Rochester, New York. She was the first of four children of William and Ellen McDermott Gleason, emigrants from Ireland. William was the owner of a machine tool company, later named Gleason Works. He developed a machine to automatically plane bevel gears in 1874, and Gleason Works became a prominent gear cutting company. When Kate was 11, her stepbrother Tom died of typhoid fever, causing hardship for both the family and the company, where he had assisted William. Shortly after, she began working for her father to fill Tom's role and became a bookkeeper for the company.

In 1884, at the age of 19, Gleason enrolled in the Cornell Mechanical Arts program, becoming the first woman in the university's engineering program. She was unable to complete her studies at Cornell due to renewed trouble at the Gleason factory. William had hired a man to replace her in the business, but the firm started struggling financially and he could no longer afford to pay her replacement. At his request, she returned to Rochester. She was never able to return to full-time studies to complete a degree, but through training and self-learning she earned the title of engineer and was recognized for her accomplishments. She received some further education as a part-time student at the Sibley College of Engraving and The Mechanics Institute (later renamed the Rochester Institute of Technology).

== Gleason Works ==
Gleason resumed her work at Gleason Works and soon rose to new positions. She was named company secretary and treasurer, and additionally became a traveling salesperson. Demand for gears soared in the 1890s as bicycle and automobile manufacturing began. In 1893, she toured Europe to expand the company's business, an early attempt at globalization by an American manufacturer, and succeeded at finding several new foreign customers. She made a second European trip to represent the company at the Paris Exhibition of 1900. In the long term, international sales became an important component of the company's revenue. In 1997, nearly three quarters of the company's sales were international.

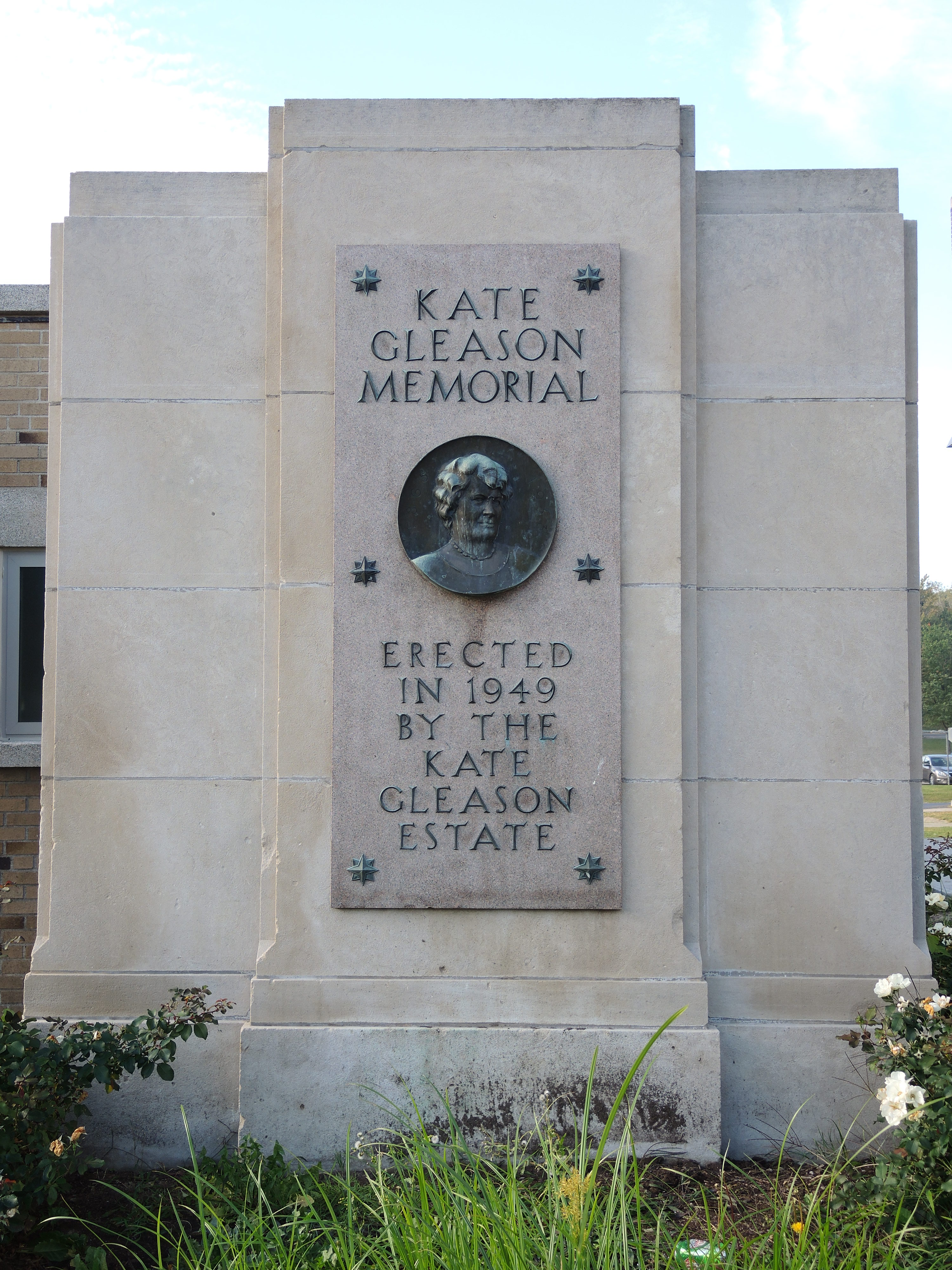
Memorial in East Rochester, New York

Fred H. Colvin described Gleason in his memoirs as

a kind of Madame Curie of machine tools […] Kate spent her youth learning her father's business from the ground up, both in the shop and in the field, so that when she branched out for herself about 1895 as a saleswoman for her father's gear-cutting machines, she knew as much as any man in the business.

In addition to her depth of knowledge, Gleason attributed her success in sales to her uniqueness in a male-dominated profession:

In those early days I was a freak; I talked of gears when a woman was not supposed to know what a gear was. It did me much good. For, no matter how much men disapproved of me, they were at least interested in seeing me, one distinct advantage I had over the ordinary salesman.

After her first trip to Europe, Gleason began to pay careful attention to her dress and public habits. She would select extremely feminine outfits to wear, used her sense of humor to charm customers, and went as far as to take voice lessons to practice the ideal pitch. She claimed that customers would recall a dress or hat she wore during a sale years later. James Gleason, a later CEO of Gleason Corporation, credited most of the company's global expansion to her work as its representative. A misconception arose that she, not her father, had invented the company's bevel planer, and the idea was promoted by her acquaintance Henry Ford.

The company's expansion necessitated larger facilities, and the family relocated their factory from Brown's Race to University Avenue between 1904 and 1911. Gleason had the new foundry modeled after the Pisa Cathedral to create a large interior space for overhead cranes. During this time, she also constructed a house for herself on East Avenue, which she named Clones, after the town of origin of her mother Ellen.

== Later career ==
Due to conflicts with her family, Gleason left Gleason Works in 1913. She joined the Ingle Machine Company in January 1914, when she was appointed the receiver of bankruptcy for the company, one of the first women to be appointed to such a position by an American bankruptcy court. Under her guidance the company was restored to profitability and repaid its outstanding debts. The company was returned to the stockholders before the end of 1915. In 1918, Gleason was appointed the president of First National Bank of East Rochester when the previous president moved overseas. Her time at the bank was mostly concerned with real estate and construction projects. She helped launch eight companies, including a housing project in East Rochester named the Concrest Community. At Concrest, she began experimenting with concrete to build fireproof houses at an affordable cost, using a pouring method she developed and mass production methods learned from the Gleason Works. The Concrest homes were sold for a price of no more than $4,000.

In the 1920s, Gleason traveled from Rochester for business opportunities in France, California, and South Carolina. She purchased and rebuilt a castle in Septmonts and built a library and movie theater in the town to commemorate the American Expeditionary Forces. During this time period she also toured California to study adobe buildings. In 1924, she was consulted by the city of Berkeley, California, to help rebuild after a fire. In the late 1920s she began to build more poured concrete buildings in Sausalito, California, but the project was not as successful as her buildings in Rochester. At her winter home in Beaufort, South Carolina, she had plans to build a community of garden apartments for artists and writers, although only ten of these homes were completed at the time of her death. The complex was completed by her sister Eleanor and opened later in 1933.

== Personal life ==
The Gleason family were friends of fellow Rochesterian Susan B. Anthony, who provided Kate with advice on business and publicity. Gleason hosted Anthony for her 86th birthday in 1906, shortly before her death. Gleason was later a strong supporter of women's suffrage. In 1912, she pledged $1,200 to the National American Woman Suffrage Association, one of the largest pledges it received. Many of her personal writings testify to her and her father's contributions to women's suffrage. Gleason viewed marriage as a hindrance to her professional life and she never married nor had children.

Gleason pursued a number of philanthropic interests in the 1920s, making large donations to orphanages, libraries, and schools. In 1929, she donated a large property to the Rochester Institute of Technology.

== Death and legacy ==
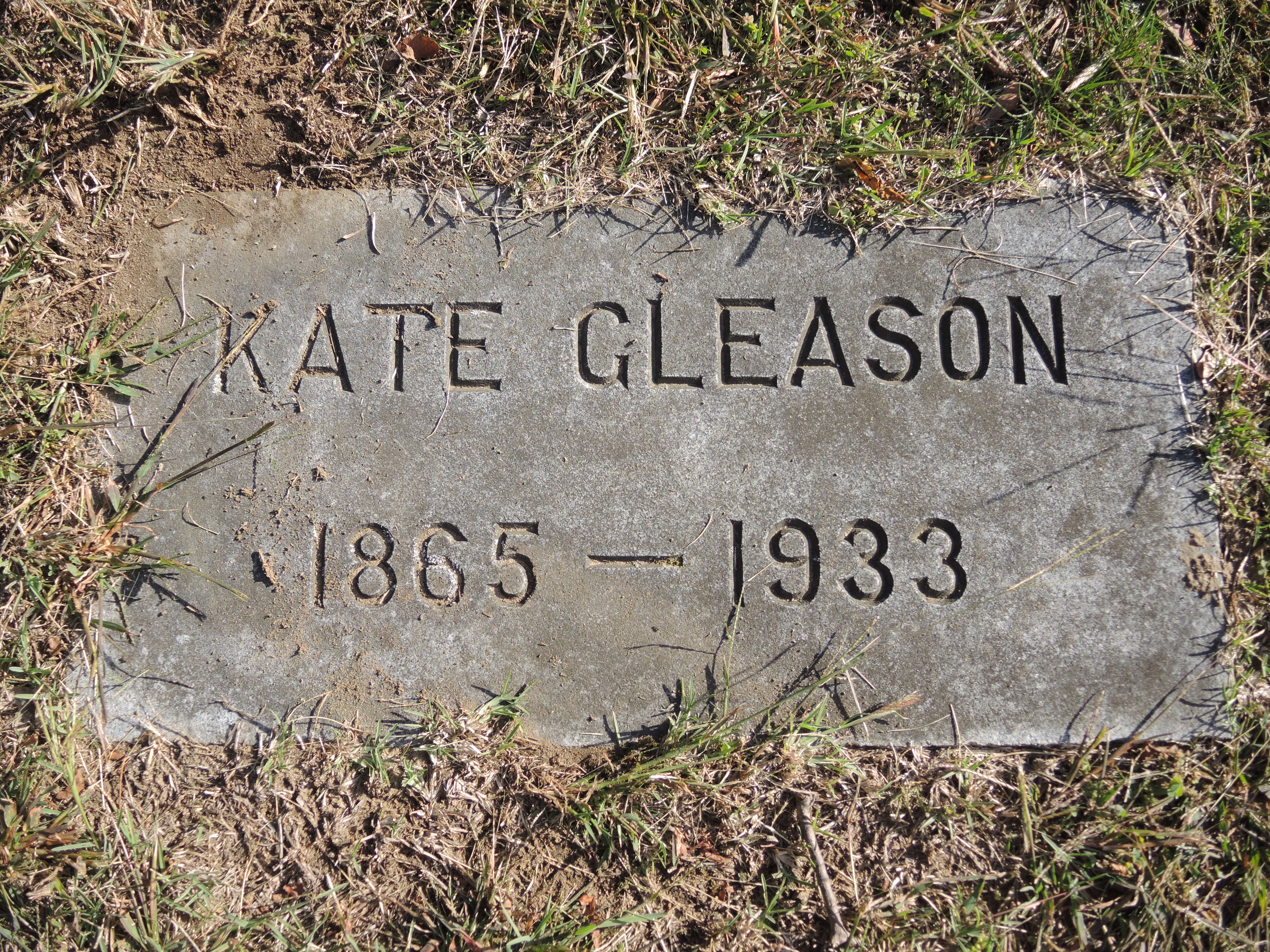
Gravestone in Riverside Cemetery

In 1913, Gleason became the first woman elected to membership in the Verein Deutscher Ingenieure. In 1914, she became the first woman elected to membership in the American Society of Mechanical Engineers, followed shortly after by Lydia Weld. Gleason represented the society at the World Conference on Power in Germany in 1930. For her work in construction, she also became the first female member of the American Concrete Institute.

Gleason died on January 9, 1933, of pneumonia, and was interred in Riverside Cemetery in Rochester. She bequeathed $348,000 of her $1.4 million estate to doctors and institutions in the Rochester area, including libraries and parks. Additional land along the Beaufort River in South Carolina was donated to the people of Beaufort County for the purpose of building a hospital and an adjacent riverside park. Beaufort Memorial Hospital now stands on the land.

The Gleason Corporation remains in operation and retains a strong connection with the Rochester Institute of Technology (RIT). The Kate Gleason College of Engineering at RIT was named after her in 1998, following a $10 million donation from the Gleason Corporation. An RIT residence hall, Kate Gleason Hall, is also named after her. In 2010, RIT Press published a collection of Gleason's letters. In 2011 the American Society of Mechanical Engineers established the Kate Gleason Award in her honor, recognizing Gleason as a pioneer of women in engineering.
