= Eyelash =

Facial feature

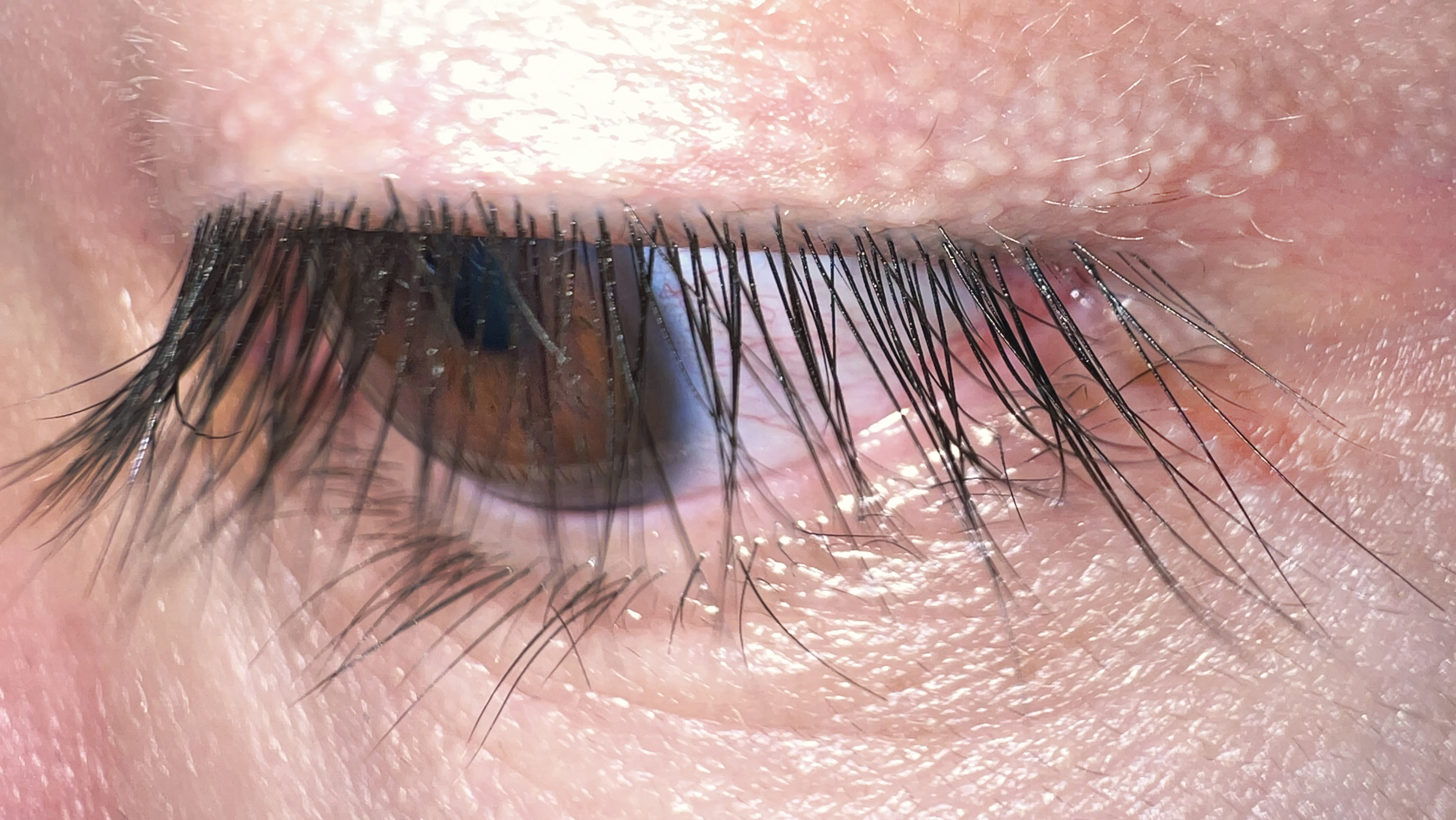
- Human eyelashes

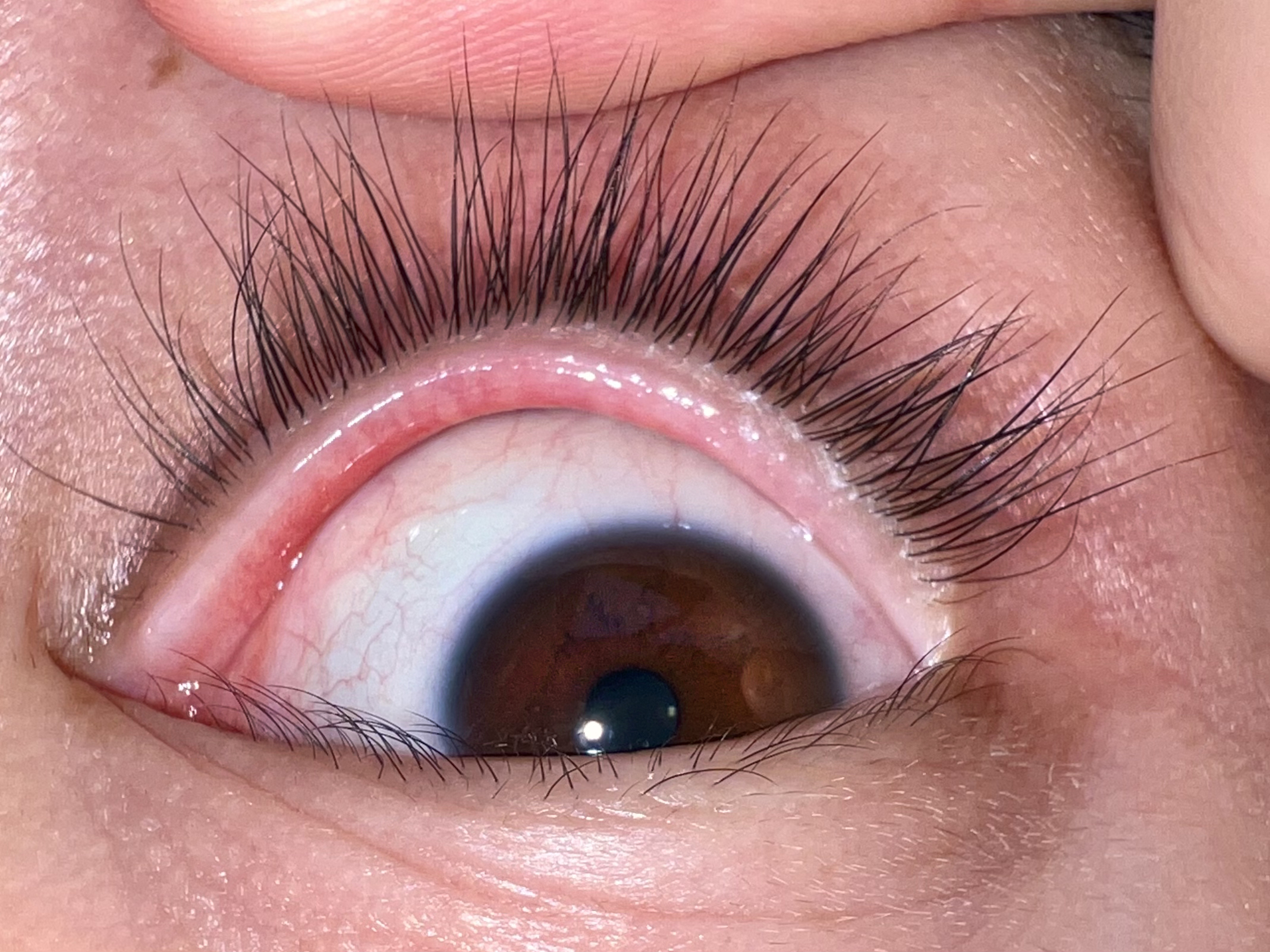
- Human lashes grow in up to six distinct layers on each upper and lower eyelids, in some cases resulting in sets of over 200 lashes surrounding each eye

Details
- System: Sensory
- Function: Lines the edges of the eyelids, heightening protection of the eye from dust and debris and triggers the blink reflex

Identifiers
- Latin: cilium
- Greek: Bλέφαρον (blépharon)
- MeSH: D005140
- TA98: A15.2.07.037
- TA2: 7057
- FMA: 53669

An eyelash (also called lash) (Neo-Latin: cilium, plural cilia) is one of the hairs that grows at the edges of the top and bottom eyelids, spanning outwards and away from the eyes. The lashes grow in up to six layers on each of the upper and lower eyelids. Eyelashes serve to protect the eye from debris, dust, and small particles, and are highly sensitive to touch, thus providing a warning that an object (such as an insect or lint) is near the eye, which then reflexively closes or flutters to rid the area of the object. The eyelid margin from which lashes grow is among the most sensitive parts of the human body, with many nerve endings enveloping the roots of the lashes, giving it sensitivity to very light tactile input even at the tips of the lashes, enabling it to trigger the blink reflex when touched. Eyelashes are also an important component of physical attractiveness, with long prominent lashes giving the illusion of large, gazing eyes, and drawing attention to the eyes.

== Etymology ==
The word eyelash is a compound consisting of the words eye, referring to the eye which the lashes surround and protect; and lash, referring to the braided cord of a whip or to the act of stroking with a whip. This is in reference to both the individual lashes resembling whips, and the action of blinking the eyes causing the lashes to move in a stroking or whipping motion.

== Function ==
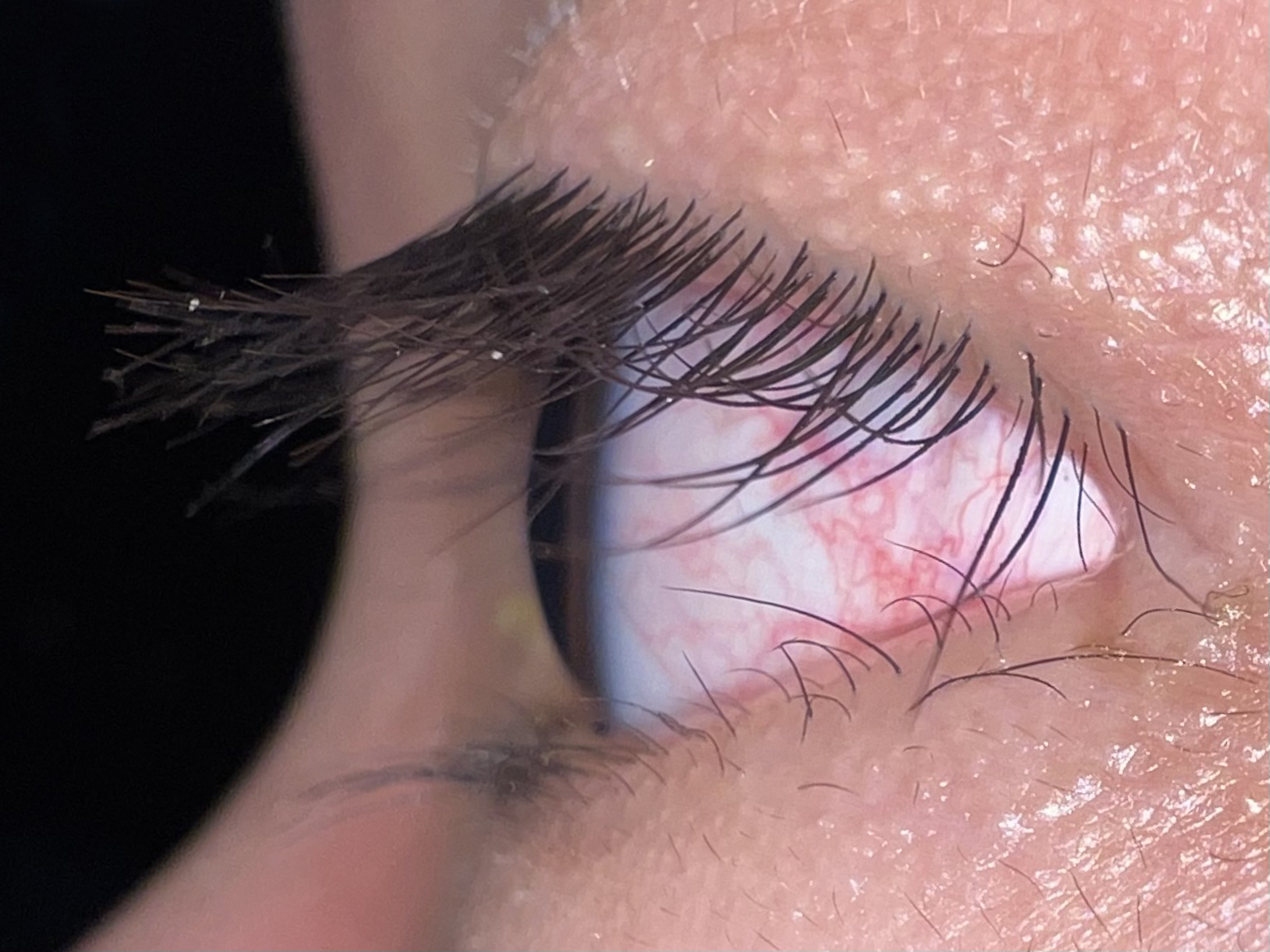
Eyelashes serve to protect the eye by catching dust and debris. Markedly prominent lashes can be seen here with some dust or debris caught on them

In humans, the eyelashes serve four main functions:

1. Protect the eye from dust and debris by catching them before they can enter the eye
2. Trigger the blink reflex in the case of a foreign body approaching the eye and touching the lashes
3. Regulate or reduce evaporation of the tear film on the cornea
4. Protect the conjunctivae from excessive light and ultraviolet radiation, by forming a filamentous curtain-like structure through their arrangement in multiple imperfect rows

== Structure ==
=== Development ===
The eyelashes of the human embryo develop from the ectoderm between the 22nd and 26th week of pregnancy. Eyelashes take about seven to eight weeks to grow back if pulled out, but constant pulling may lead to permanent damage. Their color may differ from that of the hair, although they tend to be dark on someone with dark hair and lighter on someone with light hair. Eyelash hair is not androgenic and is therefore not affected by puberty. Lash follicles do not have an arrector pili muscle associated with them, making the lashes static.

=== Length ===
Human eyelash length is the subject of extensive studies, both for the effect on their functional efficacy, and for their effect on human physical attractiveness. This is also because lashes do not continually grow to long lengths like scalp hair, and the individual variability in their length is almost solely determined by genetics.

While there is considerable variation in the length of lashes between individuals (3 mm to 10 mm for upper lashes), lashes do not vary in length by sex or ethnicity, with the upper lashes of humans typically 7 to 8 mm in length regardless of sex, and generally do not exceed 10 mm in length. Thus, the lashes of humans are considered to be remarkably long when they are 10 mm or greater in length. Lower lashes average between 5 and 6 mm in length. In trichomegaly, the lashes may grow exceptionally long (occasionally 15 mm for the upper lashes). The longest lashes usually grow from the centre of the eyelid. Human eyelash length, thickness, and darkness decrease significantly with age, hence long and thick lashes are sometimes seen as a mark of fertility and youthfulness.

Eyelash length is closely linked to the width of the eye, with the lashes typically growing to one-third the width of the eye as an evolutionary adaptation to reduce tear film evaporation and dust deposition. Lashes longer or shorter than one-third the width of the eye have been shown to have reduced efficacy in serving their function. The typical width of the human eye is 24.2 mm, resulting in the average human eyelash length of 7 to 8 mm. This evolutionary trait is perhaps why lashes in humans rarely grow beyond 10 mm in length. However, longer lashes offer more protection against ultraviolet radiation than their shorter counterparts.

=== Thickness ===
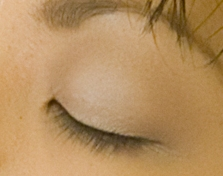
The length of eyelashes in humans vary greatly by individual, but not by sex or ethnicity. Short eyelashes are shown in this female subject

Lashes grow thick at the roots, and have tapered ends. People of Asian ethnicities have significantly thicker lashes, with an average lash diameter of 71.7 μm, than people of Caucasian ethnicities, with have an average lash diameter of 61.0 μm. However, the number of lashes on the eyelids is fewer in Asians, who typically have 150 lash hairs on the upper lids, than in Caucasians, who typically have 170 lash hairs on the upper lid.

=== Curvature ===
Eyelashes grow outwards from both upper and lower eyelids, with varying degrees of curl. People of Caucasian ethnicities have lashes that are more curled than those of Asian ethnicities. However, the degree of curling varies significantly even within a population or ethnicity, where people of Asian ethnicities can also exhibit naturally highly curled lashes.

=== Density ===
The number of individual lashes on the upper eyelid is typically 90 to 160, and on the lower eyelid 75 to 80. The number of follicles and hence lashes cannot be increased after birth because all follicles develop during embryogenesis.

=== Glands ===
The follicles of eyelashes are associated with a number of glands known as the glands of Zeis and the glands of Moll. At the edge of the eyelid, the Meibomian Gland is located as an oil-producing gland, maintaining the health and function of the eyelashes.

== Clinical significance ==
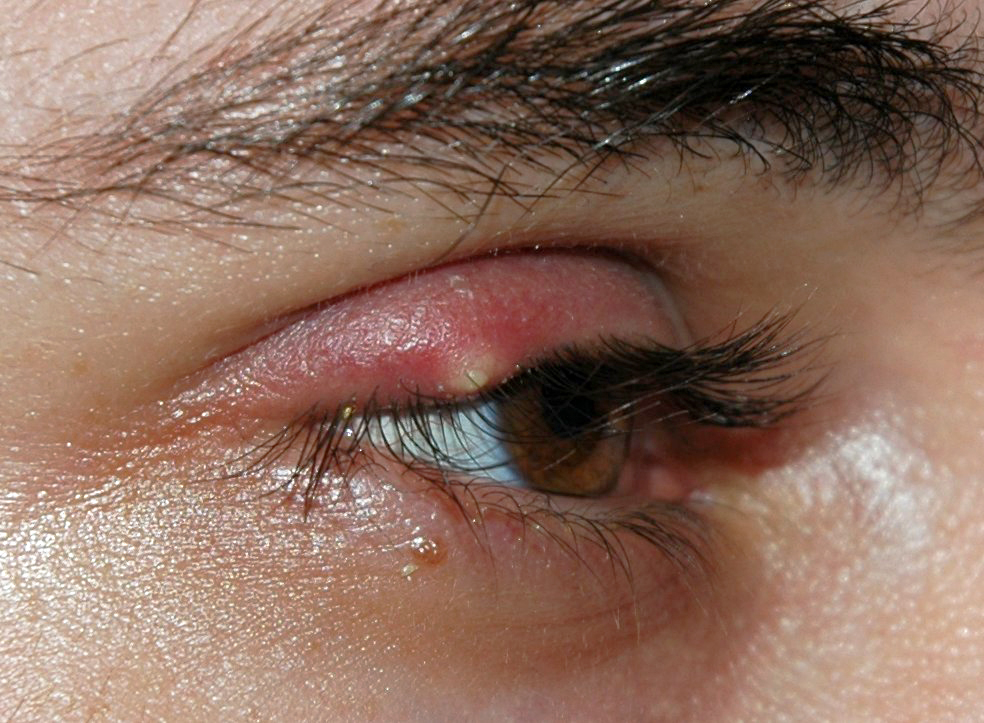
A stye

There are a number of diseases or disorders involving the eyelashes:

- Madarosis is the loss of eyelashes.
- Blepharitis is the irritation of the lid margin, where eyelashes join the eyelid. The eyelids are red and itching, the skin often becomes flaky, and the eyelashes may fall out.
- Distichiasis is the abnormal growth of lashes from certain areas of the eyelid.
- Trichiasis refers to ingrown eyelashes.
- Eyelashes may become infested with parasitic crab louse.
- An external hordeolum, or stye, is a purulent inflammation of infected eyelash follicles and surrounding sebaceous (Gland of Zeis) and apocrine (Moll's gland) glands of the lid margin.
- Trichotillomania is a disorder that urges one to pull out their own scalp hair, eyelashes, etc.
- Demodex folliculorum (or the demodicid) is a small mite that lives harmlessly in eyelash and other hair follicles, and about 20% of people have these mites living on them. Occasionally they may cause blepharitis.
- People with vernal keratoconjunctivitis have longer eyelashes, with the increased growth likely a result of the occular inflammation accompanying the condition.
- Trichomegaly is the condition of abnormally long and/or lush lashes (the objective criteria being lashes of 12 mm or greater in length on the upper eyelids).

Eyelash transplant surgeries may help to reconstruct lost or damaged lashes. The procedure may also be employed to increase the number of lash follicles on the eyelid to enhance the prominence and fullness of the lashes. The transplanted hairs usually do not have the tapered structure of real lashes, and continue to grow at the same rate as hairs from the area the follicle was extracted from. As such, they require maintenance by means of trimming.

== Society and culture ==
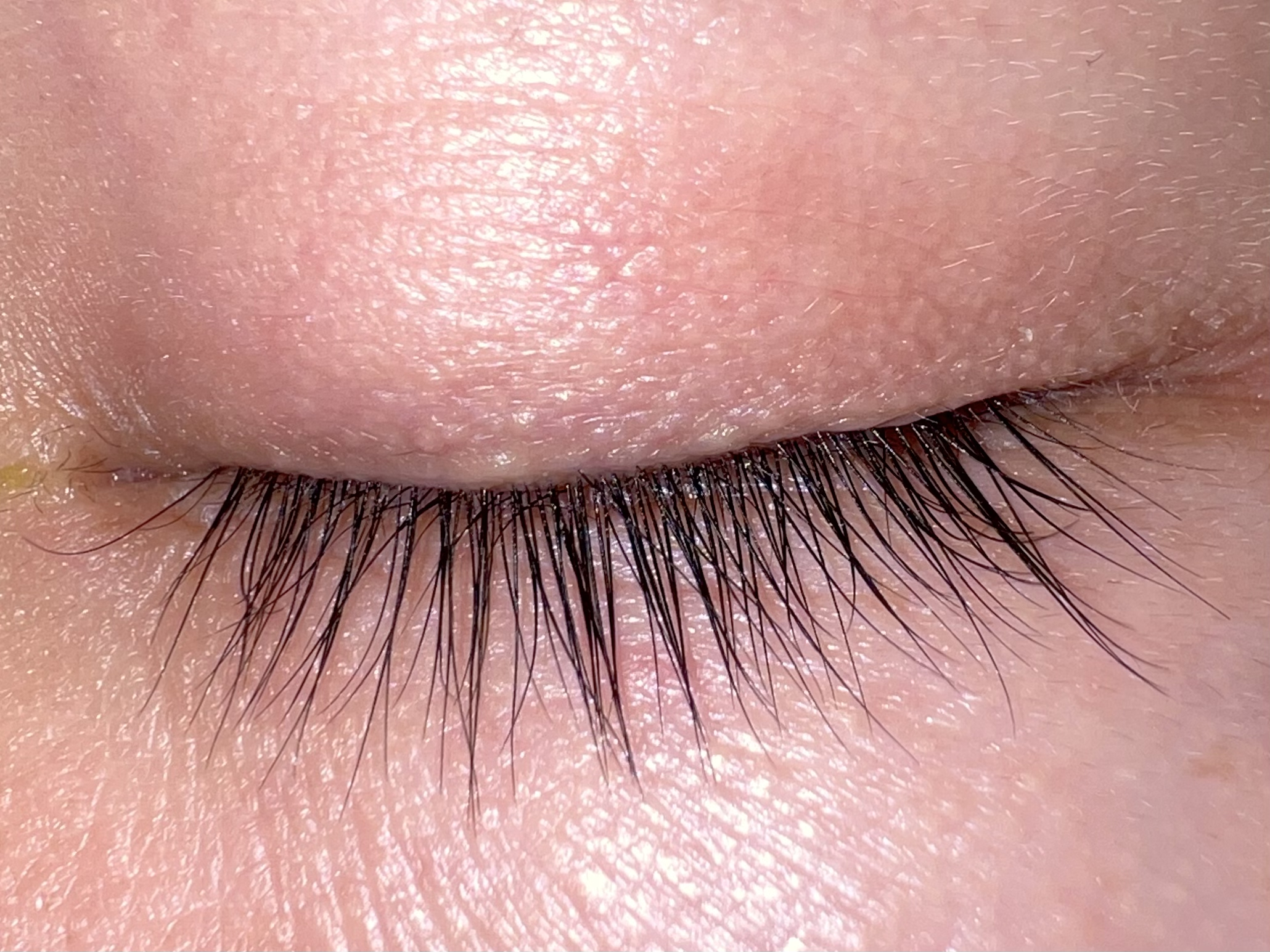
Long eyelashes are coveted as a sign of beauty and are considered an attractive facial feature in many cultures. This adult male has trichomegaly with notably prominent upper lashes measuring 14 mm long, well over the 10 mm normally considered to be long.

Prominent, luscious eyelashes have long been considered a sign of beauty in many cultures, almost universally, and as such are highly coveted, particularly by women. Having longer and thicker lashes can also have a positive psychological effect on women. Despite not varying by sex and not being a secondary sex characteristic, long, prominent lashes are frequently considered a feminine trait, with studies showing that women possessing longer lashes are perceived as healthier and more feminine. Nevertheless, long lashes are regarded as an attractive facial feature in both males and females. On the other hand, Hadza women are known to trim their own eyelashes. Nonetheless, an average length eyelash is considered the most attractive across Asian, Indian, Black and White faces.

Ancient Romans considered long eyelashes a component of aesthetically ideal eyes. Pliny the Elder wrote that eyelashes fell out from sexual excess, so women desired long lashes as a symbol of chastity.

The traditional Meitei writing system has two letters (symbols), related to eyelashes. The letter "ꯄ" ("Paa") symbolises the human eyelash, and its letter name "Paa" itself means "eyelash" in Meitei language. It has an additional form of letter, known as "Pa Lonsum" ("ꯞ").

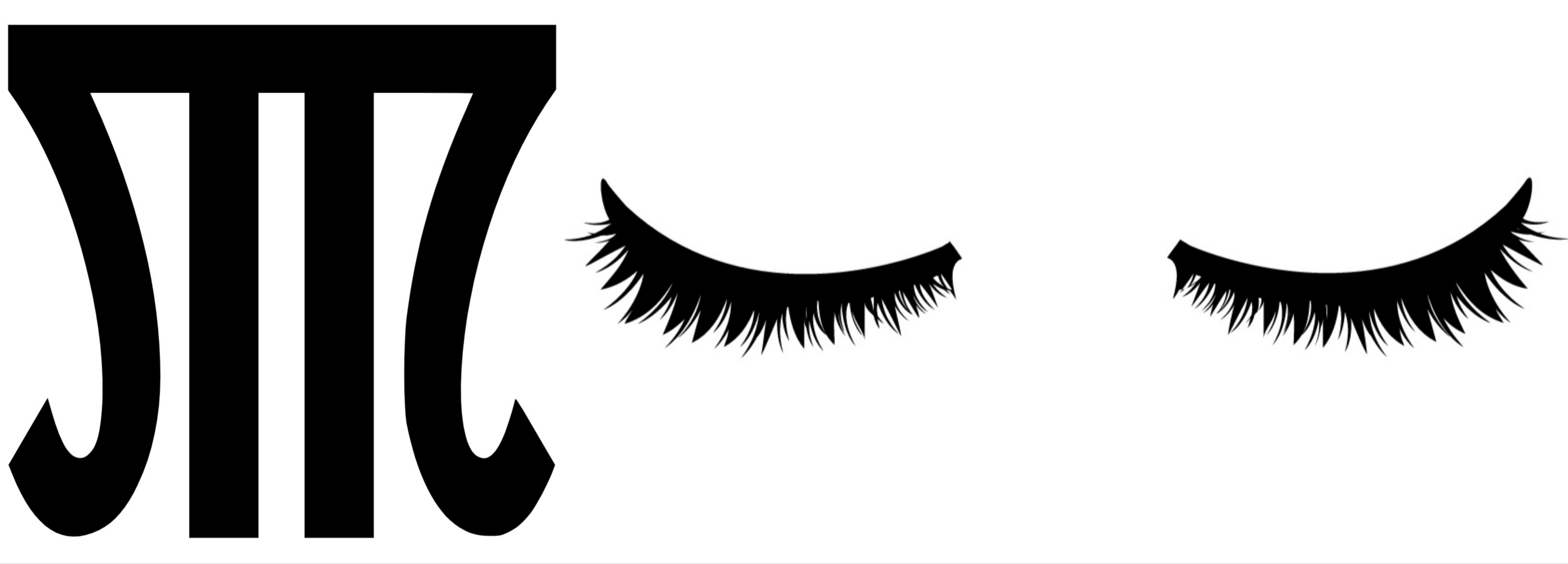
Ancient Meitei character "PAA" (ꯄ) represents as well as means "eyelash"

Smaller "PAA", known as "PAA LONSUM"

=== Nonverbal communication ===
The lashes and lids play a role in eye contact and nonverbal communication. Voluntarily blinking slowly or a few times in succession quickly is a feminine flirtatious behaviour commonly referred to as to "bat an eyelash", "bat/batting eyelashes", or "flutter/fluttering eyelashes".

=== Cosmetics ===
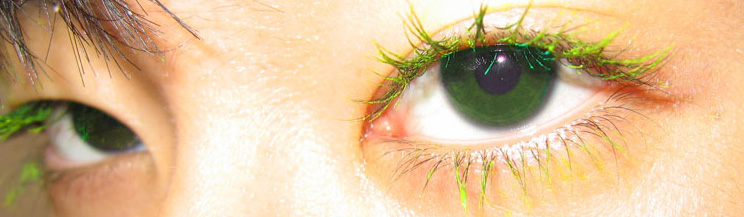
Green mascara

Because long eyelashes are aesthetically pleasing and seen as a desirable trait that adds to physical attractiveness, some people seek to enhance their eyelash length artificially, by means of eyelash extensions, false lashes attached to the eyelid, cosmetics, or growth products. Additionally, eyelashes which are curled are also more prominent, being able to better display their length especially when viewed from the front. The enhanced appearance of curled eyelashes can be cosmetically achieved by use of eyelash curlers, or eyelash perms. However, these methods do not physically lengthen the lashes.

Kohl, a black putty (usually antimony sulfide or lead sulfide), has been worn as far back as the Bronze Age to darken the edge of the eyelid (just at the bottom of the eyelashes). In Ancient Egypt, it was used as well by the wealthy and the royal to beautify their eyes. Modern eye makeup includes mascara, eyeliner, eye putty, and eye shadow to emphasize the eyes. The twentieth century saw the beginning of convincing false eyelashes, popular in the 1960s.

Permanent eyelash tints and eyelash extensions have also become popular procedures, even in fairly basic salons. It is also possible to get eyelash transplants, which are similar in nature to hair transplantation often done on the head. Since the hair is transplanted from the hair on the head, the new eyelashes will continue to grow like head hair and will need to be trimmed regularly.

Latisse was introduced in the first quarter of 2009 by Allergan as the first drug to receive FDA approval for eyelash growth. Latisse is a solution of bimatoprost, a prostaglandin analog and the active component of the glaucoma medication Lumigan. According to Allergan, noticeable eyelash growth occurs within 16 weeks. Growth is reported to occur primarily on the upper eyelashes, with as much as a 25% increase in length. In addition, the past decade has seen the rapid increase in the development of eyelash conditioners. These conditioners are designed to increase the health and length of lashes. Many utilize seed extract, minerals, and other chemicals to achieve these results.

Cosmetic companies have recently relied on scientific research of prostaglandins and the Wnt/b-catenin signaling pathways to develop eyelash products. Although bimatoprost is effective in promoting increased growth of healthy eyelashes and adnexal hairs, its effectiveness in patients with eyelash alopecia areata is debatable. Some cosmetic brands have begun using peptides in their formulation rather than prostaglandins because of regulatory rules in places like Canada and California.

== In other animals ==
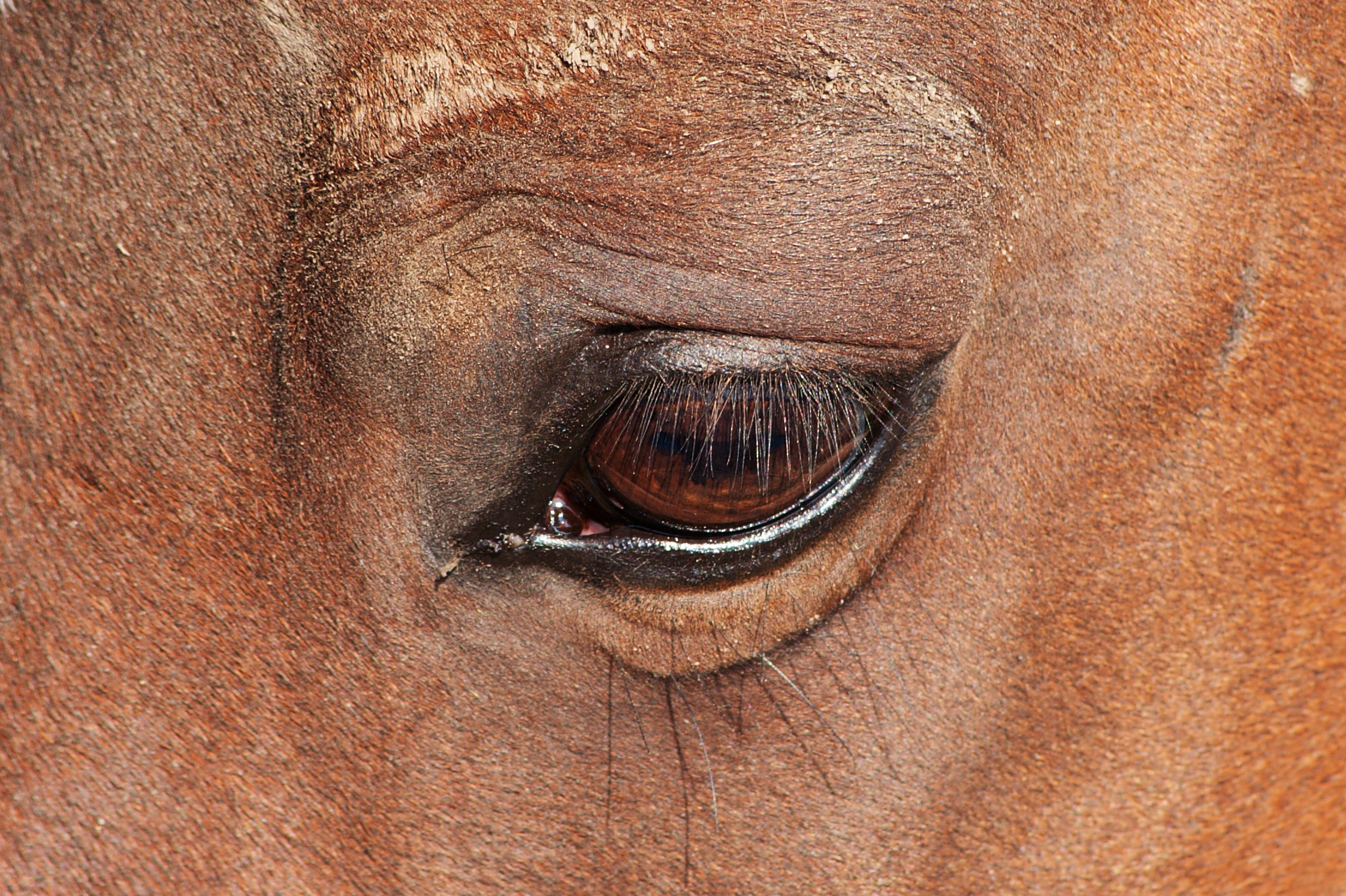
A horse's eye, showing lashes

Lashes, being hair, are found in mammals. Camels' lashes are remarkably long and thick. Horses and cows feature eyelashes as well. Inherited eyelash problems are common in some breeds of dogs as well as horses.

Eyelashes are an uncommon but not unknown feature in birds. Hornbills have prominent eyelashes (vestigial feathers with no barbs), as do ostriches. Amongst the reptiles, only Eyelash vipers show a set of modified scales over the eyes which look much like eyelashes.

== See also ==
- Eyelash extensions, used to enhance the appearance of length, curliness, fullness, and thickness of natural eyelashes
- Eyebrows, an area of short hairs above the eyes on the brow ridges
