= Eyelash implants =

Form of cosmetic surgery

Eyelash implants are a form of cosmetic surgery involving transplanting additional eyelashes around the eye. The process typically involves removing a section of hair from the patient, typically from the back of the head, and grafting the hair to the eyelids, replacing the existing eyelashes. The procedure typically involves 60 to 70 hairs per eye, and after removal and a thorough cleaning of the oil on the hair, they are reattached to patient by delicately sewing the lashes back on. Maintenance of the eyelashes is needed thereafter, as the hair continues to grow at the same rate as on other parts of the body.

== Procedure ==
Donor area preparation: Firstly donor area – usually back of the scalp – is shaved and cleansed to prepare it for the surgery. Administration of anesthesia: Then local anesthesia is administered in the area around the eyelashes. Hair extraction: After administration of anesthesia, hair follicles are extracted using follicular unit extraction. Grafts with 1 to 4 hair follicles are extracted for eyelash hair transplantation. Recipient area preparation: After extraction of hair, surgeon prepares recipient area by administering local anesthesia and making extremely small incisions for implantation of follicles. While preparing recipient site, direction and angle of eyelashes are kept in mind to produce natural looking results. Graft implantation: After preparing recipient site, surgeon implants 1 to 2 hair follicles at a time in specific directions. Single procedure usually involves implantation of 30 to 40 hair follicles to get desired density of eyelashes.
