= Yaeba =

Japanese term for a style of human teeth

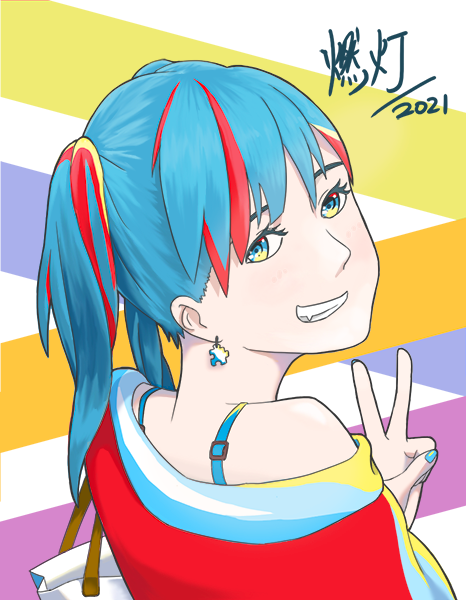
A fan art of Wikipe-tan with yaeba

In Japan, yaeba (八重歯, lit. 'double tooth'; snaggle maxillary canines) are human teeth, especially upper canines, with an uncommonly fang-like appearance. Yaeba most often refers to a tooth overlapping another tooth or protruding from higher in the gum. In Japan it is perceived as a sign of youthfulness and natural beauty.

In the early 2010s, it had become a trend where teenage girls would undergo dental procedures to cap the upper canines. It began in 2011 because of Tomomi Itano, an actress and the lead singer of the band AKB48. She popularized the yaeba look with her false tooth, and even after she got hers removed demand for such procedures endured. There was even a girl group called TYB48 (as a play on AKB48) launched in 2011, in which every member had yaeba teeth. They were created to promote a dental clinic, and generated a fair amount of publicity for the trend during the two years they were active.
