= Phylloid hypomelanosis =

- Specialty: Dermatology

Phylloid hypomelanosis is a cutaneous condition, a syndrome occurring in patients with mosaic trisomy 13 or translocation trisomy 13.

== See also ==
- Riehl melanosis
- List of cutaneous conditions
