= Eyelid glue =

Cosmetic applied to the eyelids

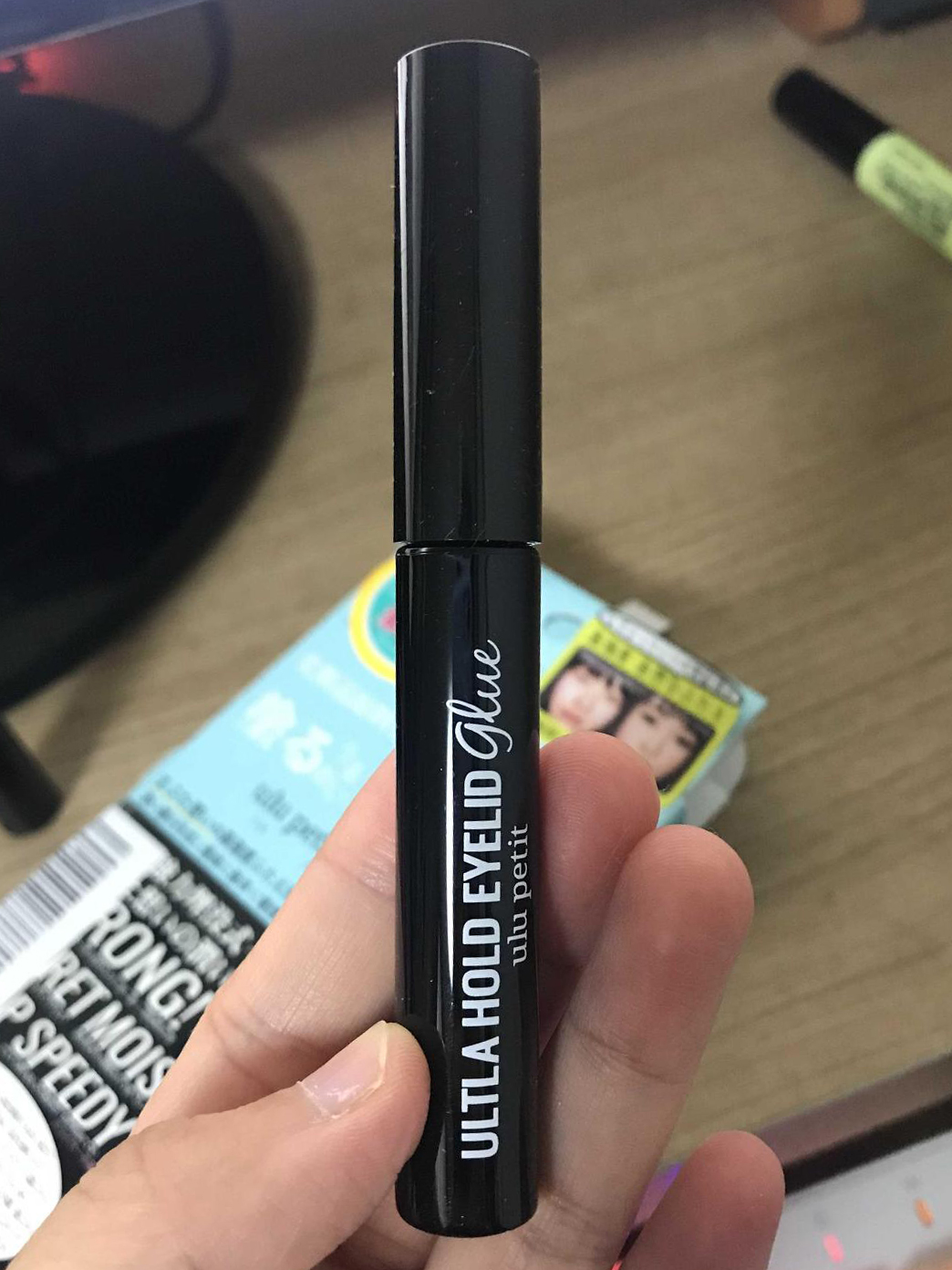
Eyelid glue

Eyelid glue, commonly called eye putti (アイプチ, ai puchi), is a type of eye make-up used in East Asia designed to change the monolid (eyelid without a crease). Eyelid glue is a water-soluble adhesive that is easy to remove.

== History ==
Eyelid glue became available in Japan in the late 1970s.

== Use ==
Double eyelids are considered a sign of feminine beauty in East Asia. Some women opt for a temporary solution by wearing eyelid glue. The glue is painted on the upper eyelid, which is then pushed upward with a plastic prong and held in place by the adhesive. The glue needs to dry for a minute before holding the fold. This method creates or enhances a fold in the eyelid ("double eyelid") that opens up the eye exposing the eyelashes. The use of eyelid glue also exists amongst men.

The glue does not last and must be reapplied after a few hours. Eyelid glue may also cause irritation.

== Variant ==
A variant called eyelid tape or crease tape comes in a fibrous elastic strip that is trimmed to shape and placed on the eyelid. The tape creates a crease that stays on the eyelid. The tape does not last and must be reapplied after a few hours.

== See also ==
- Circle contact lens
- East Asian blepharoplasty, a form of plastic surgery that has the same visual effect but is permanent
- Epicanthic fold
