= Karl Nessler =

German inventor (1872–1951)

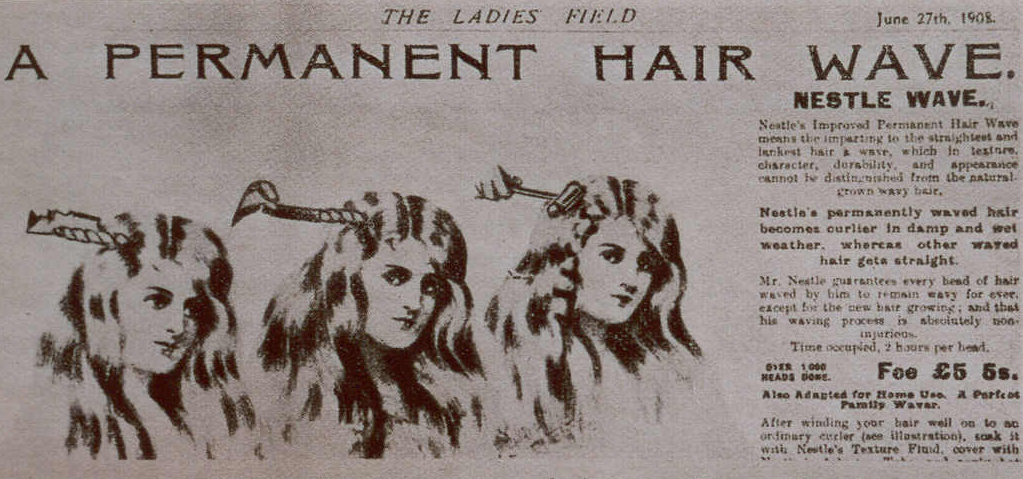
1908 advertisement from The Ladies Field

Charles Nessler (born Karl Ludwig Neßler; 2 May 1872 – 22 January 1951) was the inventor of the permanent wave.

== Life ==
Karl Ludwig Nessler was born on 2 May 1872 in Todtnau. He was the son of Rosina (née Laitner) and Bartholomäus Nessler, a cobbler in Todtnau, a small town located high in the Black Forest, just beneath the Feldberg. He reportedly conceived the idea of a permanent wave early on. As a youngster, he occasionally worked as a shepherd and observed that wool, in contrast to human hair, is constantly crimped. He also noticed that plant tendrils would naturally curl in advance of rainstorms. He began an apprenticeship with a village barber in nearby Schopfheim-Fahrnau, but he dropped out after just a few months. He worked in Basel and Milan in different jobs, learned Italian and French, and finally moved to Geneva. There he worked again as a barber and hairdresser and finished his apprenticeship at an elegant beauty salon. Adapting to the French-speaking environment, he called himself Charles Nessler, and often spelled his surname Nestle. Later, he moved to Paris, where he tested his first perm on Katharina Laible from Ulm.

To do this, Nessler first divided Laible's hair into three plaits, tying each close to her scalp, moistening the hair with a secret mixture, and winding the hair into spirals around metal rods that projected from the head like horns. With self-constructed, electrically heated tongs, similar to a waffle iron, he heated the plait-covered rods. The tongs had to be held constantly, and initially blisters rose on Laible's scalp. The curling effect was finally successful on Nessler's third attempt, when he washed out the hair rollers for a long time. The curl remained and was dubbed a "permanent wave".

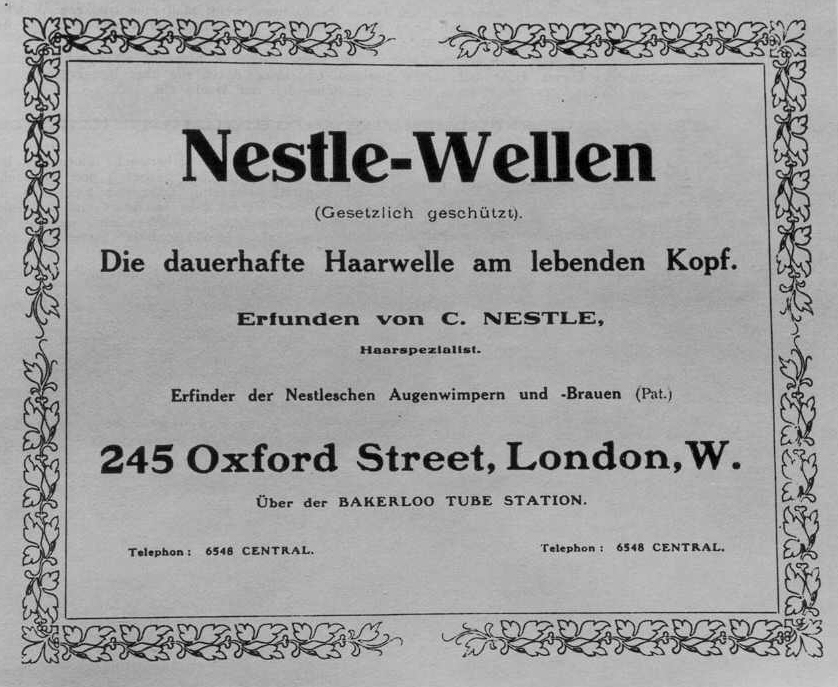
German-language advertisement for Nessler's hair salon in London's exclusive Oxford Street

In 1902, Nessler patented another invention, artificial eyebrows, in the United Kingdom. He moved to London, married Katharina Laible in her home-town of Langenau and took her with him. Though the perm was an immediate success in London, it was not well received at a demonstration for leading hairdressers held on October 8, 1906, perhaps because Nessler's English colleagues resented his competition for their regular customers. His electric permanent wave machine was patented in London in 1909. In 1912, some improvements of his apparatus were patented again. In 1914, he patented a last improvement before the outbreak of the war.

When World War I broke out, Nessler was interned and his assets were confiscated as alien property. In 1915, he emigrated to the United States, where he learned that counterfeited copies of his invention were already being sold. In April 1919, his improved Hair Curler was filed at the United States Patent and Trademark Office. He was already an American citizen. The holder of the patent was his Nestle Patent Holding Co., Inc. He developed a do-it-yourself kit for perms and opened a chain of hair salons. His base of operations was the salon at 8-14 East 49th Street in Manhattan. In 1927, his chain had 500 employees, with branches in New York City, Chicago, Detroit, Palm Beach, and Philadelphia. The annual advertising budget was $300,000.

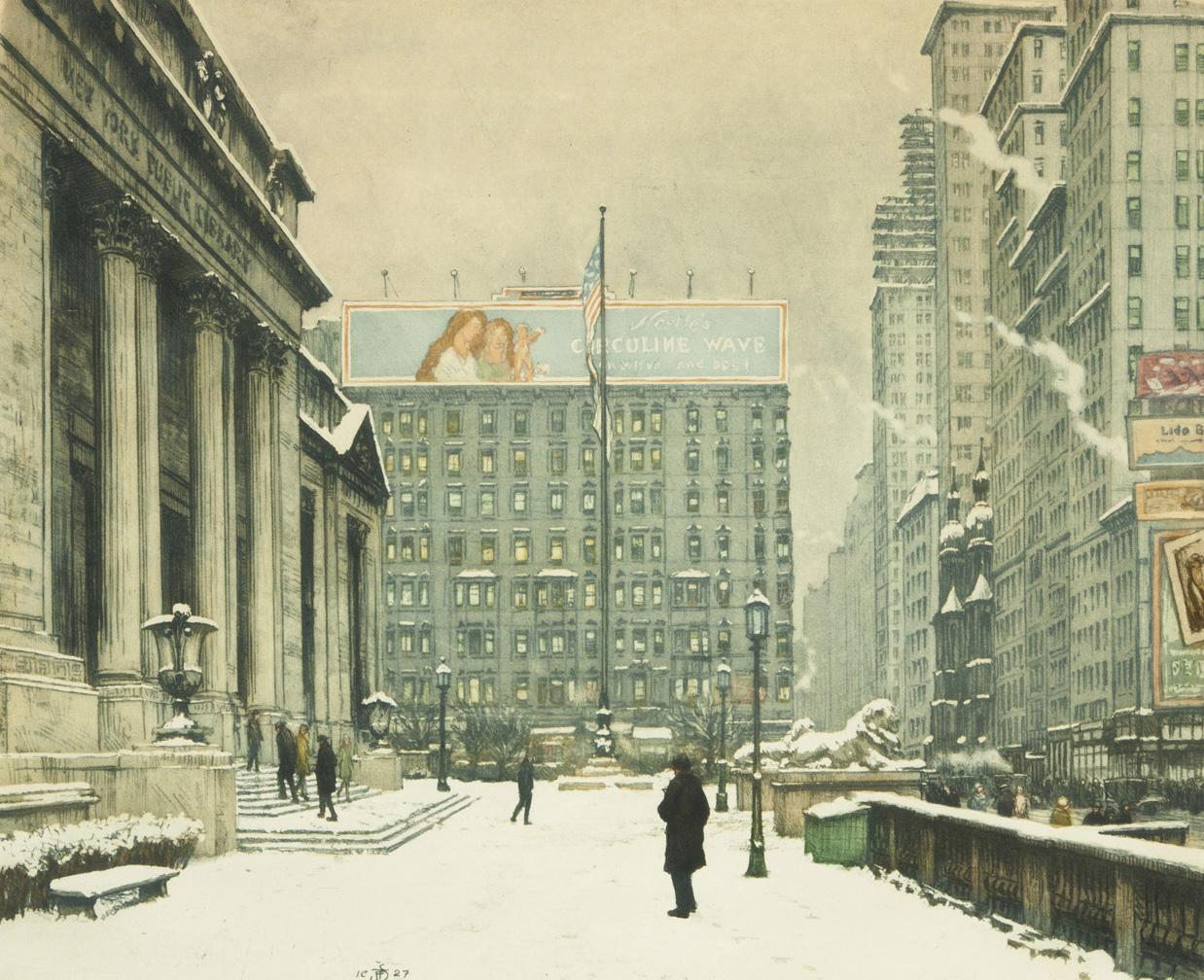
An advertisement for Nestle's Circuline Wave can be seen in the background of this painting by Tavík František Šimon

Nessler amassed considerable wealth, but he never forgot his humble origins. During the German hyperinflation of the early 1920s, he donated the respectable sum of 20,000 Marks to the impoverished people of his birthplace. In 1928, he sold his hair salon chain, production facilities, and distribution network to the Nestlé-Le Mur Company, investing the proceeds in the stock market. In the same year, he put his name on a volume, The Story of Hair (New York: Boni and Liveright, 1928), which is believed to have been ghost-written by Zelda Popkin, a journalist and novelist of the period. He lost almost everything in the stock market crash of 1929. In the following years, he worked on methods of skin regeneration, wrinkle prevention, and hair regrowth. In 1935, his wife Katharina died. His attempts to regain his losses were hindered by the breakout of World War II and never really succeeded.

On 22 January 1951, Karl Nessler died at the age of 78 of a heart attack at his home in Harrington Park, New Jersey.

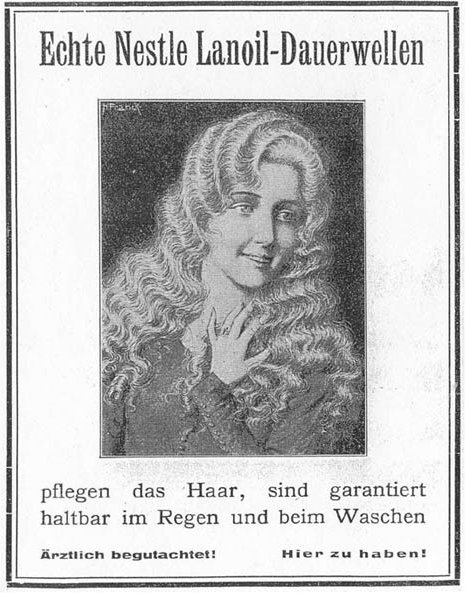
Turn-of-the-century German advertisement for the permanent wave

== Honors ==
Since 1996, the Nessler Prize has been awarded in Todtnau, the birthplace of Karl Ludwig Nessler. The award was launched to mark the invention of the permanent wave 90 years earlier. At 2,500 Euros, it is the most highly endowed craft prize in Germany. Financed by the Nessler Committee, it is awarded to a particularly deserving and dedicated person in the hairdressing trade. Previous winners have been Alfred Preussner of Gevelsberg (1996), Erwin Schmidt of Bretten (1999), Manfred Schmock of Darmstadt (2002), Siegfried Helias of Berlin (2006), Franz Josef Küveler of Mendig/Palatinate (2011), and Günter Amann of Wehr/Baden (2016).

In October 2006, on the 100th anniversary of the invention of the permanent wave, a Nessler Museum opened its doors in Todtnau. It is furnished as a hairdressing salon in the Art Nouveau style.

== See also ==
- German inventors and discoverers
