= Eyelash curler =

Grooming device

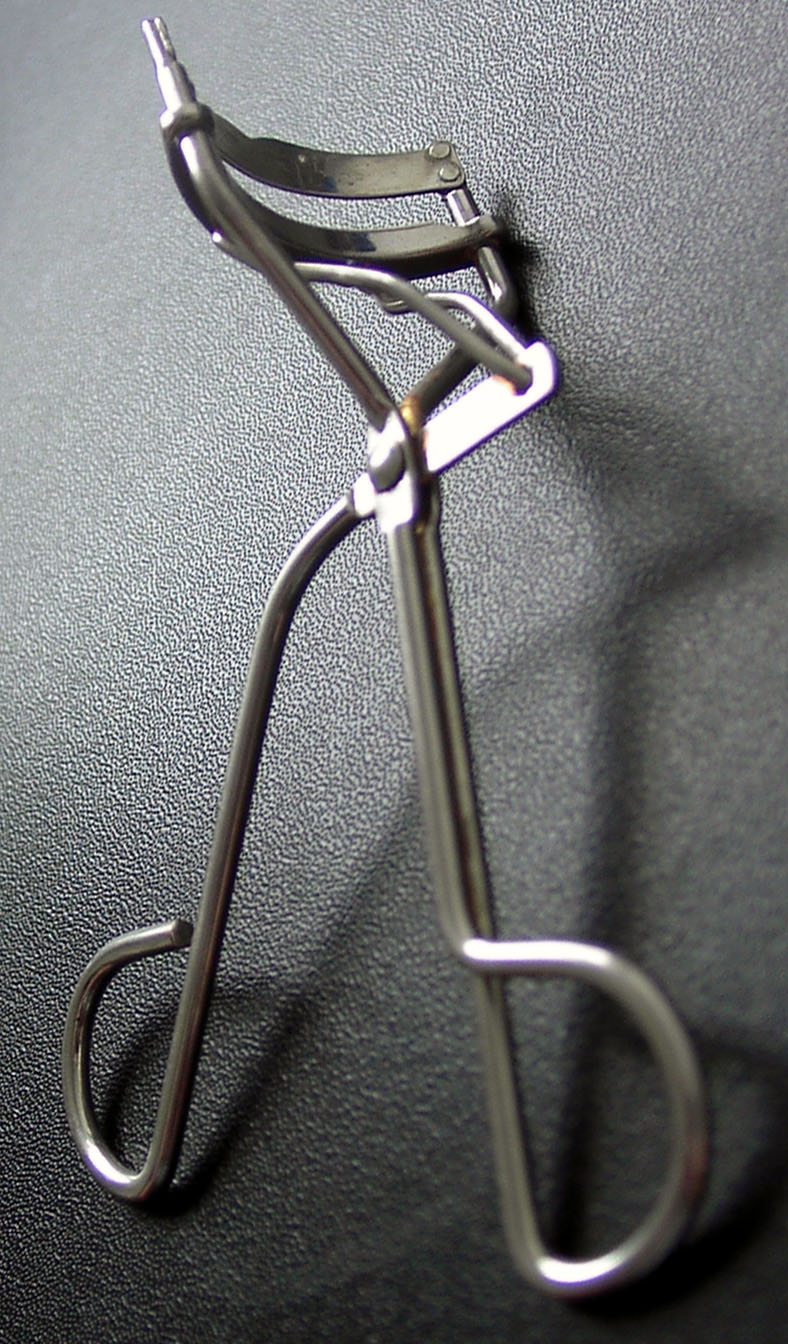
An unheated metal eyelash curler

An eyelash curler is a hand-operated cosmetic tool that curls eyelashes. Usually only the upper eyelashes are curled.

== History ==
The eyelash curler was patented in the United States on April 7, 1931. Originally named Rodal, the brand changed the product's name to Kurlash.

Traditional eyelash curlers use a spring-loaded mechanism to clamp the eyelashes between two metal plates. Eyelash curlers are usually made of metal, and often have rubber pads where the curlers make contact with the lashes. The general design of these devices remains similar to that of the 1940s. Manufacturers include Shiseido and Shu Uemura.

== Types ==
The two most common types of eyelash curlers are heated curlers and traditional eyelash curlers. An unheated curler that is curved for the natural shape of the eye and has pads to press against eyelashes. An unheated curler may be heated with a hair dryer before using but not to the extent to burn the delicate skin above the eyes. Heated eyelash curlers deliver a more intense curl that lasts longer.

== Disadvantages ==
Pulling on the eyelashes while curling can lead to weakening of the roots. Holding the clamp down on lashes for extended periods can lead to lashes becoming weak or shedding because they protect the eye from wind and dust and don't grow back quickly.

Eyelash curlers can lead to accidents where a user pinches or burns the eyelid, potentially causing serious eye injury.

== See also ==
- Tweezers
- Fake eyelashes
- Mascara
