= Theatrical makeup =

Makeup as used by theatrical performers

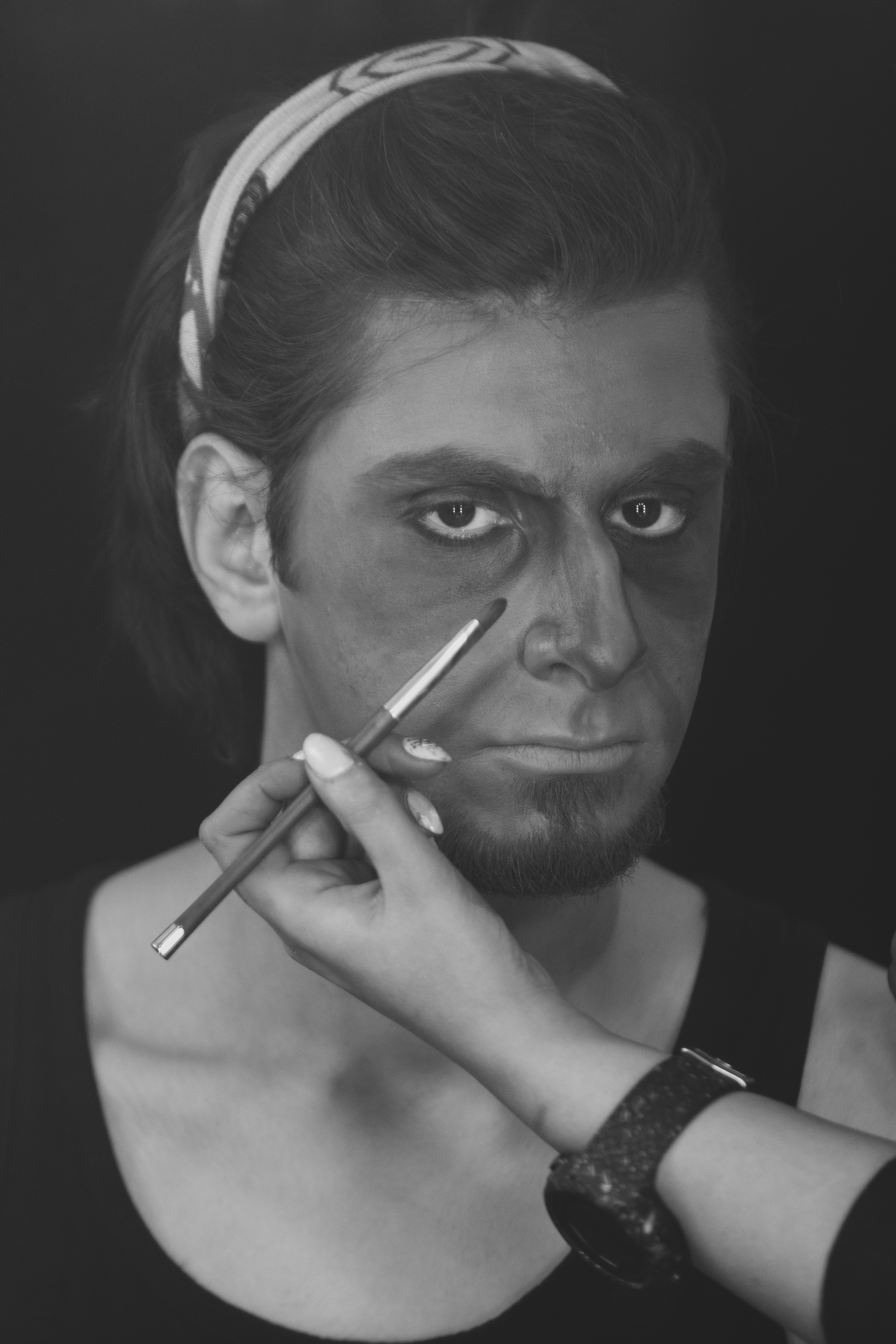
An actor having face makeup applied

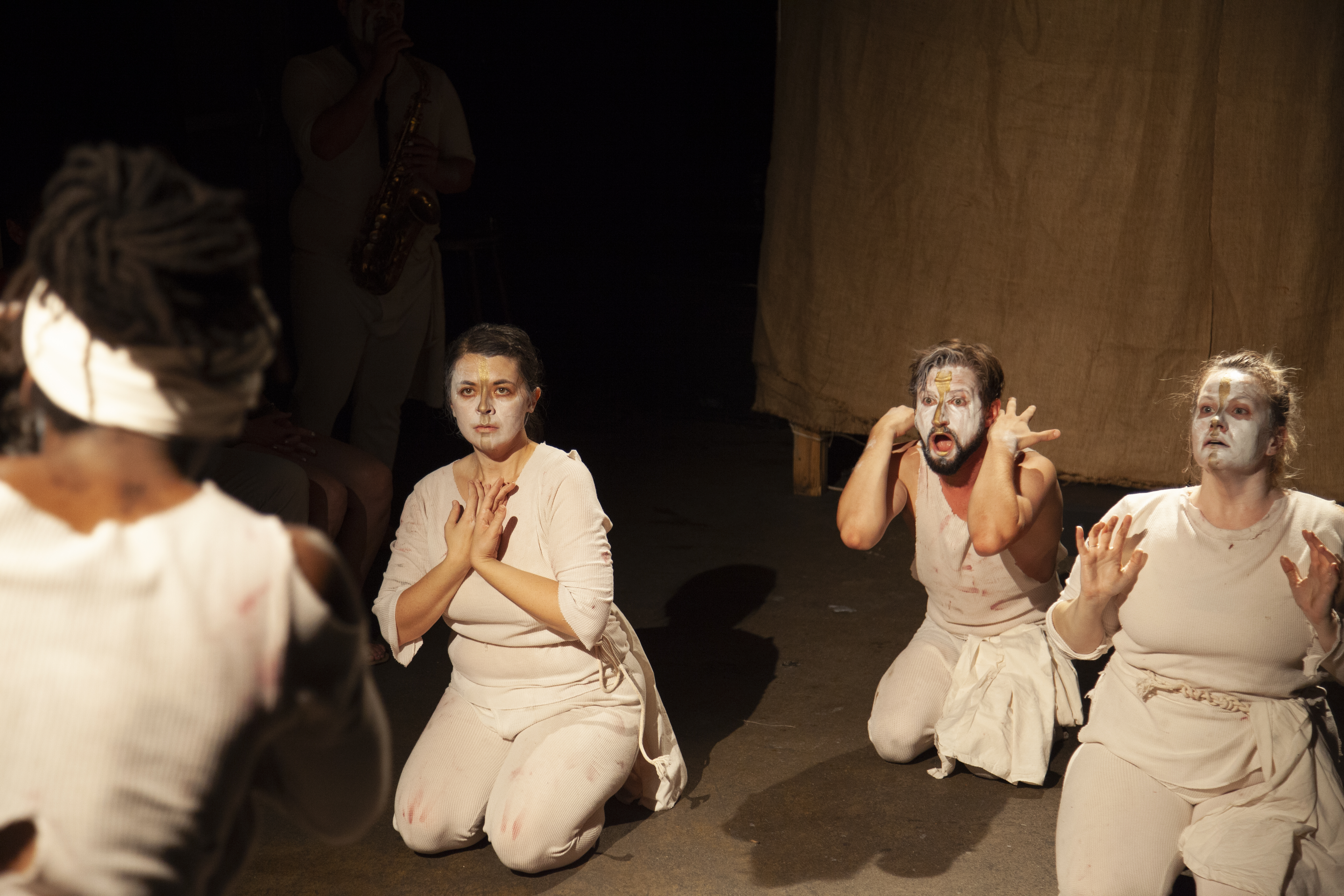
Oresteia by Aeschylus, adapted by Stairwell Theater, 2019

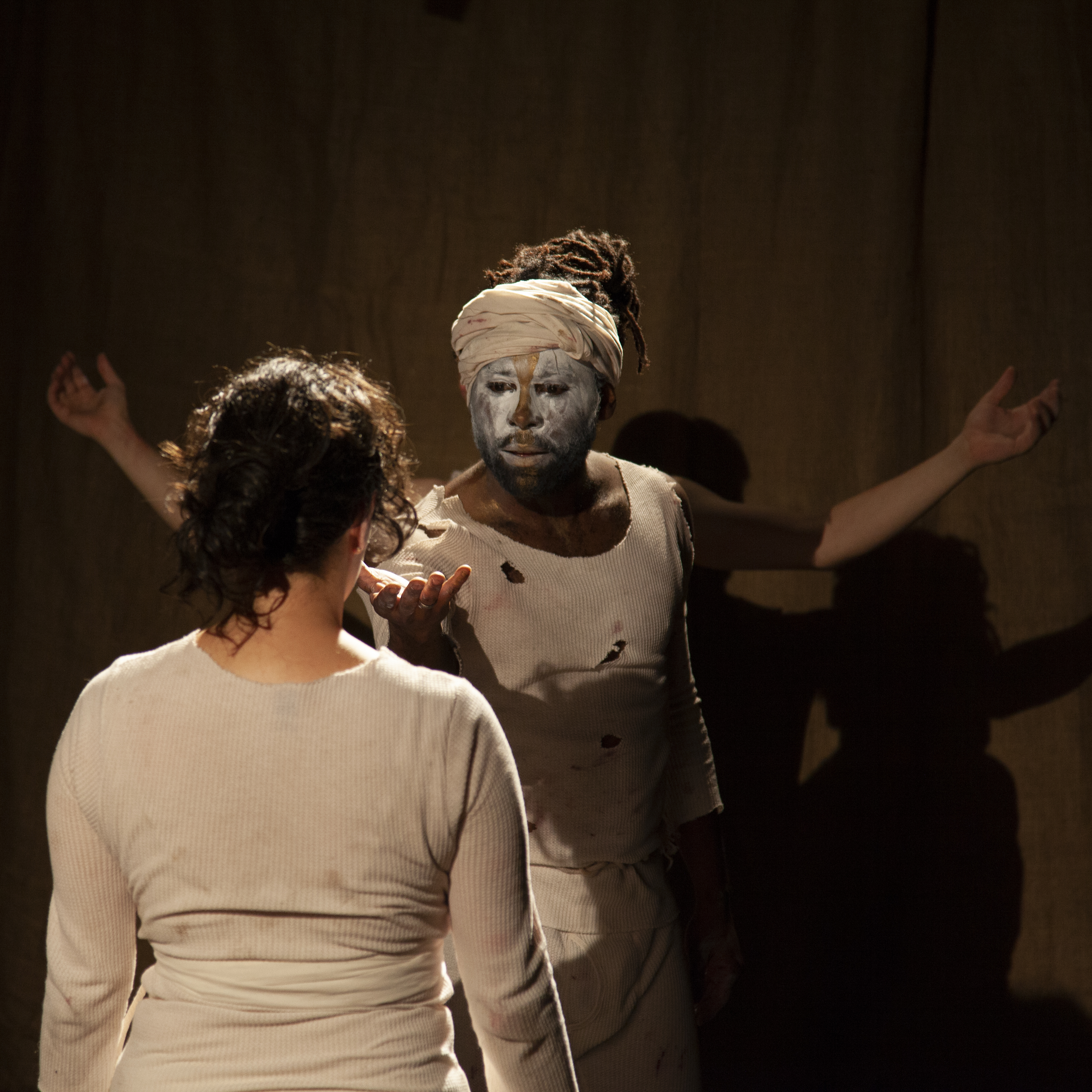
Marcus Stewart wears face make-up in Oresteia by Aeschylus, adapted by Stairwell Theater, 2019

Theatrical makeup is makeup that is used to assist in creating the appearance of the characters that actors portray during a theater production.

== Background ==
In Greek and Roman theatre, makeup was unnecessary. Actors wore various masks, allowing them to portray another gender, age, or entirely different likeness. Thespis, considered to be the first actor, used white lead and wine to paint his face. In medieval Europe, actors altered their appearances by painting their faces a different color. Performers who portrayed God painted their faces white or gold; actors playing angels painted their faces red. During the Renaissance, actors were creative and resourceful when making-over their faces. They used lamb's wool for false beards and flour as face paint.

Advancements in stage lighting technology required stage makeup to evolve beyond one over-all face colour to a multidimensional craft. Originally, theatres used candles and oil lamps; these two sources of light were dim and allowed for crude, unrealistic makeup applications. Once gas lighting, limelight and electric light were introduced to theatres, a need emerged for new makeup materials and more skillful application techniques. In 1873, Ludwig Leichner, a Wagnerian opera singer, began commercially producing a non-toxic greasepaint stick, easing the application of makeup.

== Highlight and shadow ==
Through the use of makeup, specifically highlighting and shading, the apparent shape of an actor's face can be changed. By highlighting the face's protruding bones, the features become pronounced; shadowing cavities can add depth. Sagging jowls, forehead wrinkles, eye pouches, and prominent veins can be created by manipulating highlights and shadows. A highlight is a base makeup that is at least two shades lighter than the base. It is applied on the bridge of the nose, cheekbones, and areas under the eyes and below the brows. Using a color two shades deeper than the base provides depth and definition. This depth is commonly used on the eye sockets, to thin the sides of the nose, to shallow the cheeks, and to minimize heaviness under the chin.

== Makeup and lighting ==
Lighting controls makeup to a high degree. Makeup can lose its effectiveness due to incorrect stage lighting. Conversely, skillful lighting can greatly aid the art of makeup. Close communication between the lighting director and the makeup artist is crucial for the best possible effect.

Understanding light's effect on makeup and various shades and pigments is important when designing a performer's makeup. The following are among the basic rules of light: nothing has color until light is reflected from it; an object appears black when all of the light is absorbed; an object appears white when all of the light is reflected. If certain rays are absorbed and others are reflected, the reflected rays determine the color.

=== Light's effect on makeup ===
- Pink tends to gray the cool colors and intensify the warm ones. Yellow becomes more orange.
- Flesh pink flatters most makeup.
- Fire red ruins makeup. All but the darker flesh tones virtually disappear. Light and medium rouge fade into the foundation, whereas the dark red rouges turn a reddish brown. Yellow becomes orange, and the cool shading colors become shades of gray and black.
- Bastard amber is flattering because it picks up the warm pinks and flesh tones in the makeup.
- Amber and orange intensifies and yellow most flesh colors. They turn rouges more orange. Cool colors are grayed.
- Green grays all flesh tones and rouges in proportion to its intensity. Green will be intensified. Yellow and blue will become greener.
- Light blue-green lowers the intensity of the base colors. One should generally use very little rouge under this type of light.
- Green-blue washes out pale flesh tones, and will gray medium and deep flesh tones, as well as all reds.
- Blues gray most flesh tones and cause them to appear more red or purple.
- Violet causes orange, flame, and scarlet to become redder. Rouge appears more intense.
- Purple affects makeup like violet lighting, except reds and oranges will be even more intense, and most blues will look violet.

== Straight makeup ==
Straight makeup is a style of makeup that provides a natural, clean and healthy glow.

=== Skin ===
If a performer's skin is perfectly toned, makeup spreads smoothly and adheres easily. Dry skin or oily skin is dealt with prior to makeup application; otherwise, the makeup appears blotchy or smeared due to variations in absorption. Performers with dry skin use a moisturizer daily and after their faces have been cleansed following a performance. Performers with oily complexions use a facial toner wipe or astringent to remove the oil and allow smooth application.

Skin has four basic tones: brown, fair, pink and olive. Individuals with fair, pink, and olive skin tones use olive, beige, or suntan bases. Makeup artist and performers select shades compatible with the natural skin tone, but the base is one to several shades deeper. Performers with predominately pink or ruddy complexions use base colors with cool undertones. The character, size of the theatre, and light intensity will determine the tone depth of the foundation.

A thin layer of base makeup is applied to the neck, ears, and face using a white rubber sponge or fingers. A heavy application of base appears aged and creepy.

=== Rouge ===
Fair complexions are enhanced by soft shades of peach and pink, while brown complexions are best accented with coral shades. The moist powder is applied before powder; dry rouge is used to accent the already powdered makeup.

=== Eyes ===
Eyes and eyebrows are among the most expressive tools of communication for performers.

==== Eye shadow ====
Grease or stick shadow is applied to the eyelids and blended out toward the eyebrow bone before powder is applied; dry eye shadow is used alone or to intensify and touch up the color underneath. Dark eye shadow or grease deepens the eye sockets, creating a skull-like effect. Shades of brown and gray are best for individuals with fair complexions. Individuals with brown complexions use lighter shadows such as toast, mushroom or soft yellows.

==== Eye liner ====
Liquid eyeliner, cake eyeliner, or the eyebrow pencil is used to accent and frame the eyes. There are two ways to line the upper lid of the eye: the owl eye or the almond eye. The owl eye is used to widen the eye and involves using a heavier line in the middle of the lid. The almond-shaped eye is created by extending the line out beyond the outer corner of the eye. The lower line is created by using the same tool used on the upper lid. The line begins a quarter-inch from the inner corner of the eye. This extra space is needed to open the eye.

==== Eyelashes ====
Mascara is used to add extra attention to the eyes. Black lash mascara is the most popular and commonly used by women with fair and brown complexions. Very fair individuals and men use brown mascara. The bottom lashes are coated with mascara and to avoid using false lashes, a process of layering powder and mascara is used to provide greater thickness.

=== Powder ===
A generous amount of powder is needed to reduce unwanted shine. If a performer's makeup is under-powdered, his skin oils will break through quickly, producing shine and possibly running. After powder is applied to the entire face, starting under and around the eyes, it is gently pressed for thirty seconds. The excess is brushed off with a large soft brush or piece of cotton. A wet natural sponge or cotton is wiped lightly across the face to set the makeup, to remove any visible powder, and to eliminate the masky feeling.

Translucent powders are used for fair complexions because they do not alter the original color of the base, the under-rouge, or the moist eye shadow. Brown complexions are set with tinted that is compatible with the base color. It is used sparingly over the under-rouge and moist eye shadow. After the powder is applied, dry eye shadow and dry rouge are added.

=== Lips ===
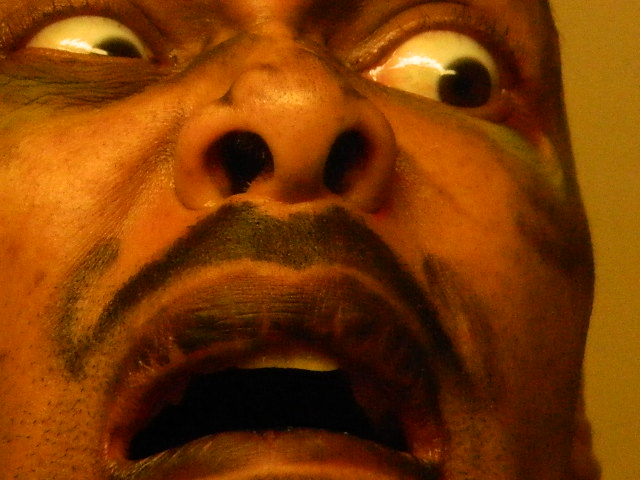
Applied makeup to the lips and cheeks assisting in the conveyance of emotion.

Though the eyes are the most expressive feature of the face, the eyes and ears of the audience follow mouth movements to understand a play's progression. If a performer's lips are underdone or overplayed, they will detract from the performer and the performance. A general rule is: the larger the mouth, the deeper the lipstick tone. However, the actor should not appear "all mouth".

Fair complexions use shades of lipstick like pink and coral. Brown complexions are enhanced by coral and orange shades. Red lipsticks are reserved for large theatres and character portrayals. An auburn or brown pencil are used to provide definition to the lips. Lipsticks on men can look doll-like. Men use natural-colored lipsticks, lightly applied.

== Training and education ==
Because stage actors are seen from farther away than actors on screen, it is crucial that their makeup is more dramatic and professionally done. Many higher-learning institutions have drama departments where all aspects of theater are taught, including the art of theatrical makeup. Some independent agencies also provide classes in theatrical makeup, and online courses are also available. Through training, makeup artists learn important techniques such as hand-eye coordination, ability to draw straight lines and consistent shapes, creativity, good grooming and personal hygiene habits, etc. Many makeup artists who specialize in theatrical makeup build portfolios to show their clients and employers. Many of them work as freelance makeup artists or work for cosmetics brands in department stores.

== Stage Makeup vs. Screen Makeup ==
Stage makeup is designed to enhance facial features and expressions, so they remain visible to audiences from a distance, often under bright and varied lighting conditions. In contrast, screen makeup is applied more subtly because cameras capture fine details, and harsh lighting is generally controlled in film and television sets. The techniques, materials, and intensity differ between stage and screen to suit the medium's visibility requirements and artistic goals

== See also ==
- Blackface
- Prosthetic makeup
- Theatrical blood
