= Ishika Taneja =

Indian businesswoman

- Awards: Guinness World Records

Ishika Taneja (born 2 September 1994) is an Indian beautician.

== Career ==
Ishika also featured in a promotional song for the Indian Political Thriller film Indu Sarkar, co-written, co-produced, and directed by Madhur Bhandarkar in 2017. Ishika has also featured in the Indian web series Hadh, which was produced and written by Vikram Bhatt.

Ishika made a Guinness world record in December 2014 by doing fastest 60 full airbrush makeups in 60 minutes on 60 different models in DLF Emporio Mall, New Delhi.
