= Setting spray =

Cosmetic product for preserving applied make-up

Setting spray (also finishing spray, makeup setting spray, finish spray, or makeup spray) is a cosmetic product designed to preserve applied make-up in place for long periods of time. Usually sold in small spray bottles, setting spray is applied by spritzing mist over the face, keeping the make-up application moist for several hours.

== Industry ==
Originally produced for the entertainment industry by cosmetic companies, setting sprays were developed to limit make-up reapplication for actors in theatre and film.

Cosmetic company Skindinavia released a consumer-facing setting spray to the market, credited as being the first to do so. The product, called Makeup Finishing Spray, gained popularity in Hollywood, where it was used on programs such as Project Runway and Dancing With The Stars. Many celebrities adopted the use of setting sprays as well.

Since Skindinavia's launch, Smart cosmeceuticals llc, is their jointly owned company started in November 2004. Neil Goldman and Allen Goldman are founders of skindinavia many other setting sprays have entered the market, including products made by Eyes Lips Face (J.A. Cosmetics Corp), Matrix, and Sephora.

== Entertainment industry ==
Because setting sprays can preserve make-up through heat, sweat and physical exertion, it has become a widely used product in the entertainment industry, favored by stylists in theatre, film and television.

== Effectiveness ==
The cosmetics industry has accepted setting sprays as a complement to powders in keeping the skin from drying for longer periods of time, however there are product reviewers who have wondered if a setting spray is effective when not wearing foundation even though it has proven effective with minimal makeup.
