= EC Regulation 1223/2009 on cosmetics =

European Union regulations

EC Regulation 1223/2009 on cosmetics sets binding requirements for cosmetic products that have been made available on the market within the European Union. Manufacturers of products that fall under the category or cosmetics are required to abide by this regulation as they prepare their initial release of products and while continuing to sell said products within the Member States of the EU.

== Description ==
EC Regulation 1223/2009 was created by the European Parliament and Council with the intent of establishing and harmonizing standards for cosmetic products that are available on the market and meet the Regulation's definition. Compliance to these standards helps protect the functioning of the internet market, but most importantly, it provides a high-level of protection for the safety and health of EU citizens. The Regulation was set into force on July 11, 2013.

== Regulated aspects ==
In its quest to protect the health and safety of EU citizens, EC Regulation 1223/2009 regulates a multitude of aspects related to the manufacturing, safety assessment and labeling of products that are considered to fall into the category of cosmetics.

=== Responsibility and accountability for safety ===
Before a cosmetic product can be released on the market, proof must be provided that it is safe for human health during the course of its intended use or what is considered to be reasonable foreseeable conditions of its use. Article 3 of EC Regulation 1223/2009 builds upon Directive 87/357/EEC guidelines regarding the safety of the product in reference to its instructions for use, its disposal and most importantly, its labeling. A safety assessment must be performed and a cosmetic product safety report provided to demonstrate compliance with Article 3. Guidelines for the report are found in the Regulation's Annex I.

Under Article 4 of the Regulation, a representative of the manufacturer must be named as the “responsible person” for dealing with compliance with EC 1223/2009. This responsible person is responsible for ensuring that the manufacturer remains in compliance before and after bringing their cosmetic product to market.

In the event the cosmetic product does not meet the requirements of compliance under the Regulation, the responsible person must address those issues. If the manufacturer becomes aware that the cosmetic product presents a threat to human health, the responsible person must notify the competent authorities within each Member State where the product is available. The notification would include details of the risks of using the product, non-compliance issues and what corrective actions will be performed. Corrective actions may include withdrawing the product from the market or initiating product recalls.

=== Maintaining an accessible product information file ===
Another responsibility of the responsible person is that they must maintain a product information file (PIF) for each cosmetic product that is put on the market by his or her company under Article 11 of EC 1223/2009. This file must remain accessible to the relevant competent authority and / or government for at least 10 years after the last batch of the product was placed on the market. The product information file at minimum must contain information and data regarding the description of the cosmetic product, safety reports regarding the product, and evidence that the product performs according to manufacturer claims. Additionally, data about any product testing on animals that may have been performed by the manufacturer, agents of the manufacturer or suppliers must be included in the information file.

=== Oversight of sampling and analysis of cosmetic products ===
Under Article 12 of EC 1223/2009 requires that cosmetic products must be sampled and analyzed in a reliable and reproducible manner. If local Community legislation, as what might be found in a Directive is non-existent, the assumption will be that the manufacturer will rely on methods of harmonized standards that have been published in the Official Journal of the European Union.

=== Obligation to supply information ===
The appointed responsible person must supply information to the EU Commission according to the guidelines provided under Article 13 of the Regulation before their cosmetic product can be placed on the market. This information includes the name and category of the product, contact information for the responsible person, the product’s country of origin, and Member State(s) where the product will be sold.

=== Labeling requirements for cosmetic products ===
Before placing cosmetic products on the market, the manufacturer must comply with container and packaging labeling guidelines under EC 1223/2009. To comply with the Regulation all required information must be presented in a legible and indelible manner.

Information to be included:

- Name and address of the responsible person and country of origin for imported products
- Weight or volume of cosmetic product at time of packaging
- Expiration date: the date until which the cosmetic product, stored under appropriate conditions, will continue to fulfil its initial function and, in particular, will remain in conformity with Article 3 (‘date of minimum durability’).

The date itself or details of where it appears on the packaging shall be preceded by the symbol shown in point 3 of Annex VII or the words: ‘best used before the end of’. The date of minimum durability shall be clearly expressed and shall consist of either the month and year or the day, month and year, in that order. If necessary, this information shall be supplemented by an indication of the conditions which must be satisfied to guarantee the stated durability. Indication of the date of minimum durability shall not be mandatory for cosmetic products with a minimum durability of more than 30 months. For such products, there shall be an indication of the period of time after opening for which the product is safe and can be used without any harm to the consumer. This information shall be indicated, except where the concept of durability after opening is not relevant, by the symbol shown in point 2 of Annex VII followed by the period (in months and/or years) (Regulation 1223/2009 EU; Chapter VI, Art 19)

- Precautions to be followed in the use of the cosmetic product
- Identifying batch number for the manufacture of the product
- Explanation of the function of the cosmetic product if its use is unclear
- Ingredients listed in descending order of the weight of each when added to the product; ingredients that are present in concentrations of less than 1% can be listed in any order after the main ingredients.

Exceptions are made for individual labeling for smaller items that allow for product information to appear as a notice on or nearby the container where the cosmetic product is displayed for sale. The function, amount, precautions, and warnings must be translated into the language of the destination country. A full translation of all label elements is requested by Austria, Bulgaria, France, Poland, Portugal and Slovakia.

==== Allergens ====
On 26 July 2023, the EU Commission published Commission Regulation (EU) 2023/1545, which amends the cosmetic regulation 1223/2009 and added extra ingredients to the list of declarable allergens

=== Restrictions for hazardous ingredients and animal testing ===
Certain product ingredients are prohibited under Chapter IV of EC 1223/2009 based on their threat to human health. The Annexes are lists of chemical substances that are either banned or restricted for use in specific product types or to certain limits in the final product. These are as follows:

Annex II List of substances prohibited in cosmetic products

Annex III List of substances which cosmetics should not contain except subject to the restrictions laid down

Annex IV List of colorants allowed in cosmetic products

Annex V List of preservatives allowed in cosmetic products

Annex VI List of UV filter allowed in cosmetic products

Chapter V addresses the prohibition of animal testing with the final formulation of cosmetic products, before being placed on the market and when testing methods are other than the alternative methods that have been validated and adopted by the EU Community.

== Evolution and legal implications ==
As a regulation, EC No 1233/2009 supersedes previous Directives that applied to cosmetic manufacturers throughout the European Union. As of 30 November 2009, all Member States are required to adhere to the guidelines for compliance to this regulation. Regulations carry more legal weight than Directives, which generally provide guidance in good practices that should be followed by individual Member States.

In the event of non-compliance, the relevant competent authority will inform the competent authority of the responsible person’s Member State. When there are grounds for concern or certainty exists that the cosmetic product presents a serious risk to human health, the authority will take steps toward instituting appropriate provisional measures to withdraw, recall or restrict the availability of the non-complying product.
