= Cosmetics =

Substances applied to the body to change appearance or fragrance

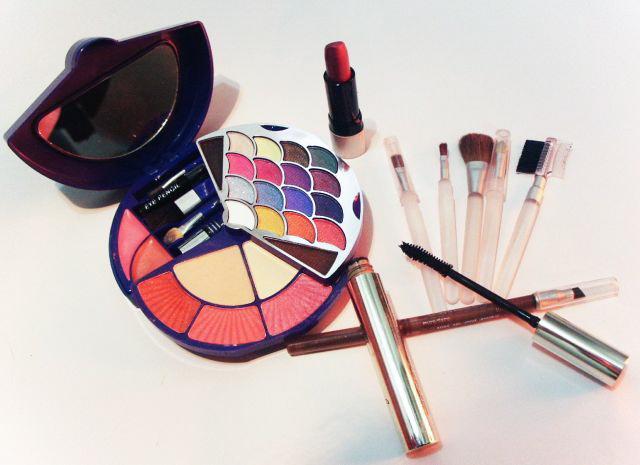
An assortment of cosmetics and tools

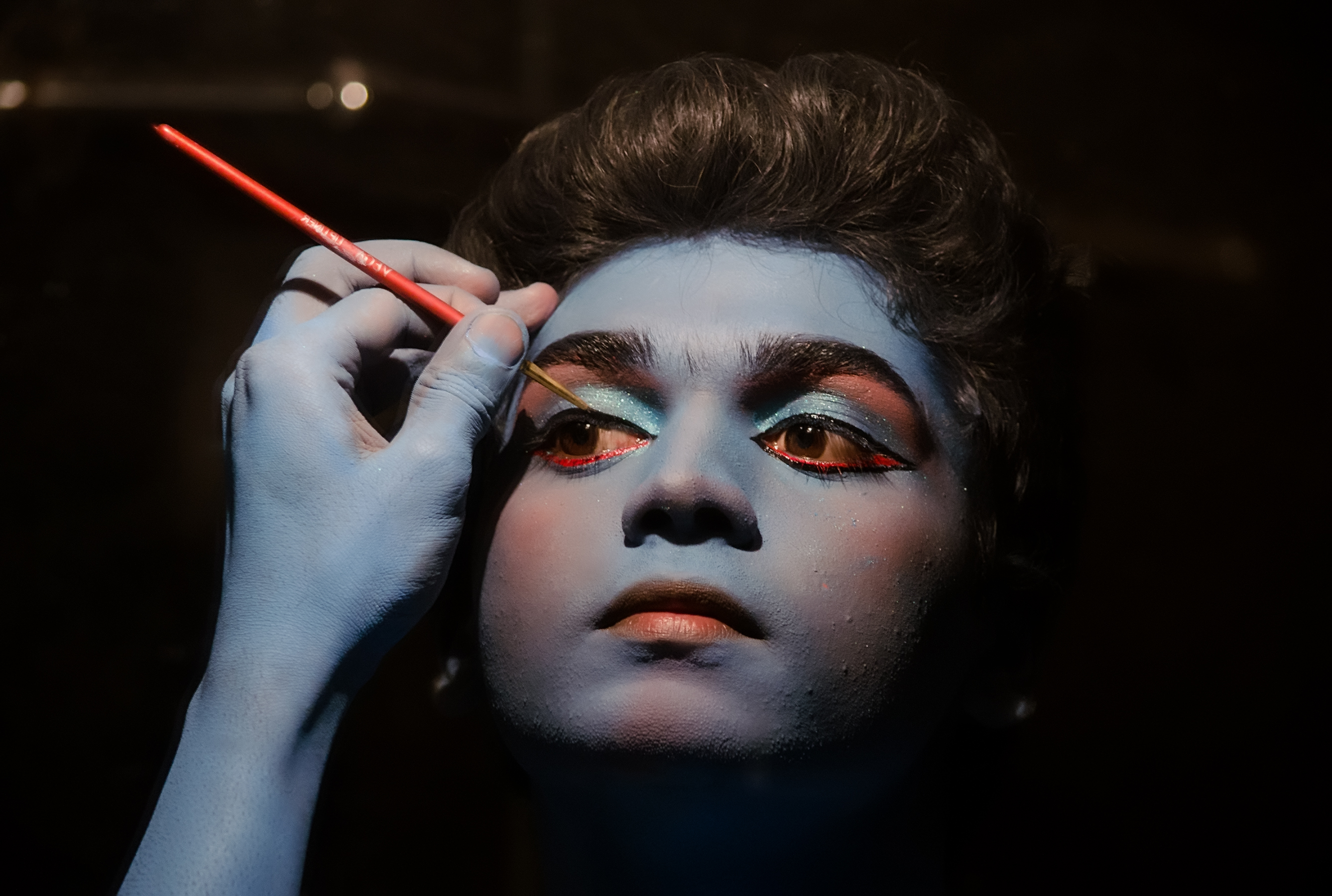
An actor applying bold makeup for a stage performance

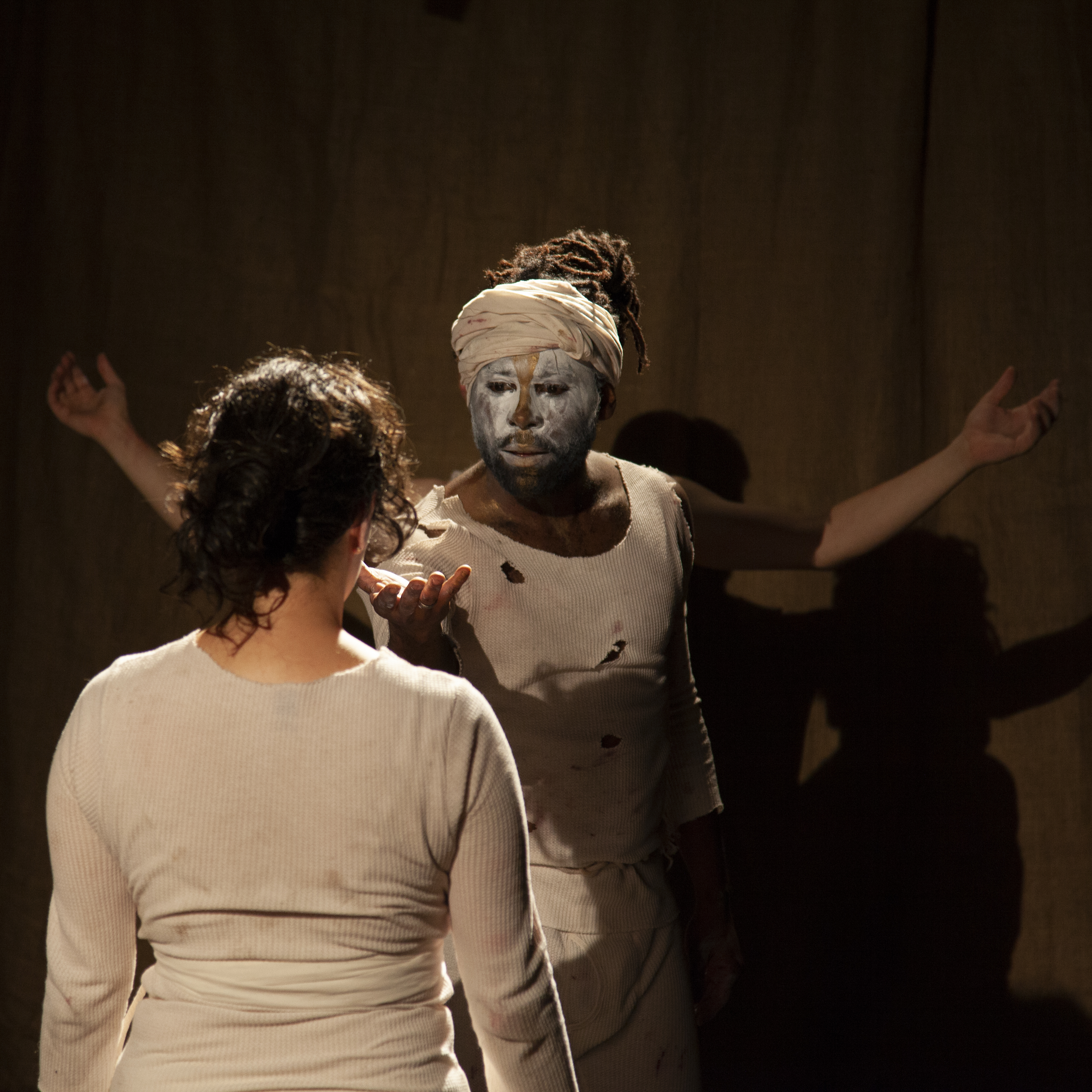
Actor Marcus Stewart wearing bold face makeup in the play Oresteia by Aeschylus (2019)

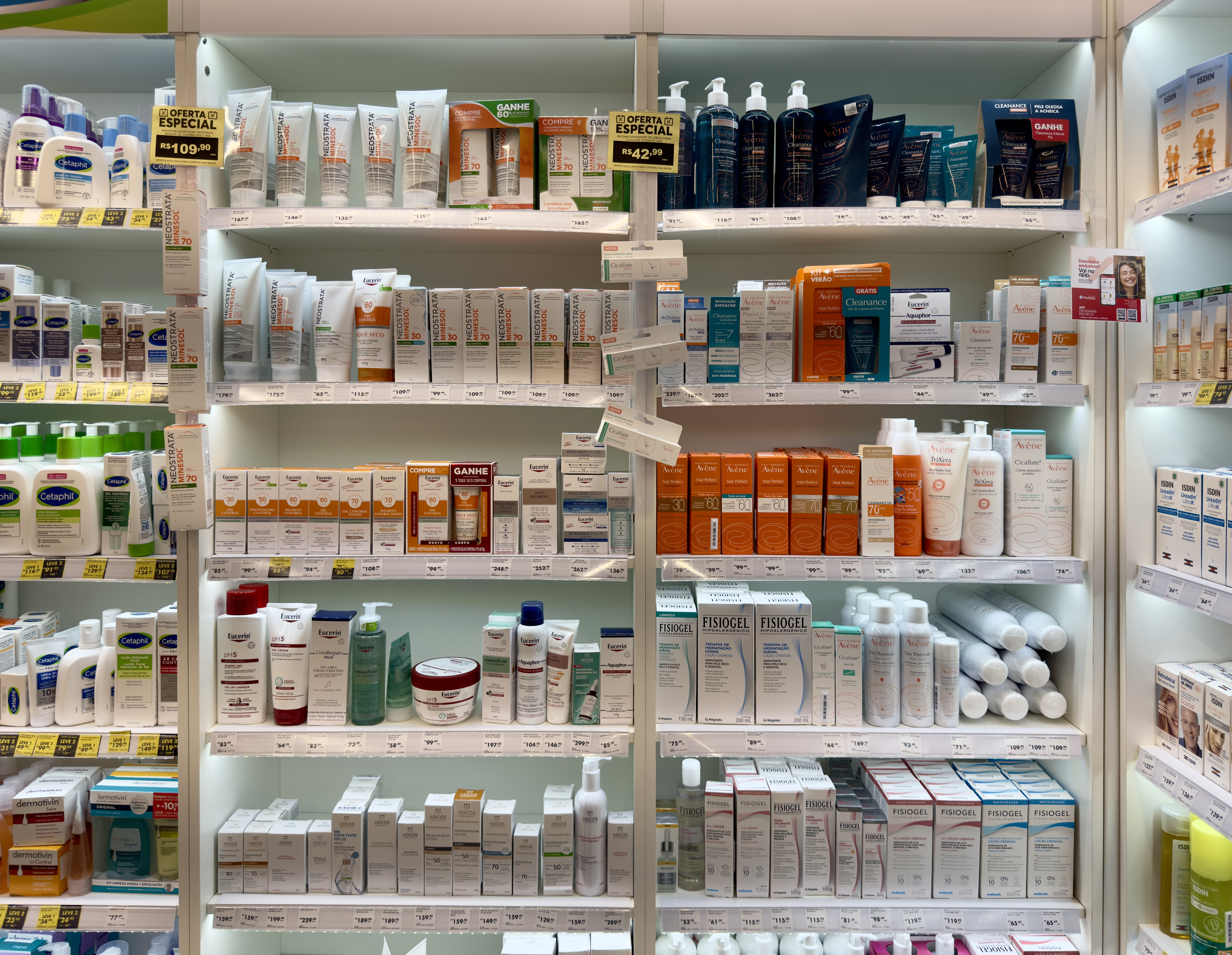
Skin care cosmetics at a pharmacy

Cosmetics are substances that are intended for application to the body for cleansing, beautifying, promoting attractiveness, or altering appearance. They are mixtures of chemical compounds derived from either natural sources or created synthetically. The products serve various purposes, including personal and skin care. They can also be used to conceal blemishes and enhance natural features (such as the eyebrows and eyelashes). Makeup can add color to the face, enhance features, or alter appearance to resemble a different person, creature, or object.

People have used cosmetics for thousands of years for skin care and appearance enhancement. Visible cosmetics for both women and men have gone in and out of fashion over the centuries.

Some early cosmetics contained harmful ingredients, such as lead, which caused serious health problems and sometimes resulted in death. Modern commercial cosmetics are generally tested for safety but may contain controversial ingredients, such as per- and polyfluoroalkyl substances (PFAS), formaldehyde releasers, and ingredients that cause allergic reactions.

The European Union and regulatory agencies around the world have stringent regulations for cosmetics. In the United States, cosmetic products and ingredients do not require FDA approval, although marketed products are monitored for safety. Some countries have banned using animal testing for cosmetics.

== Definition and etymology ==
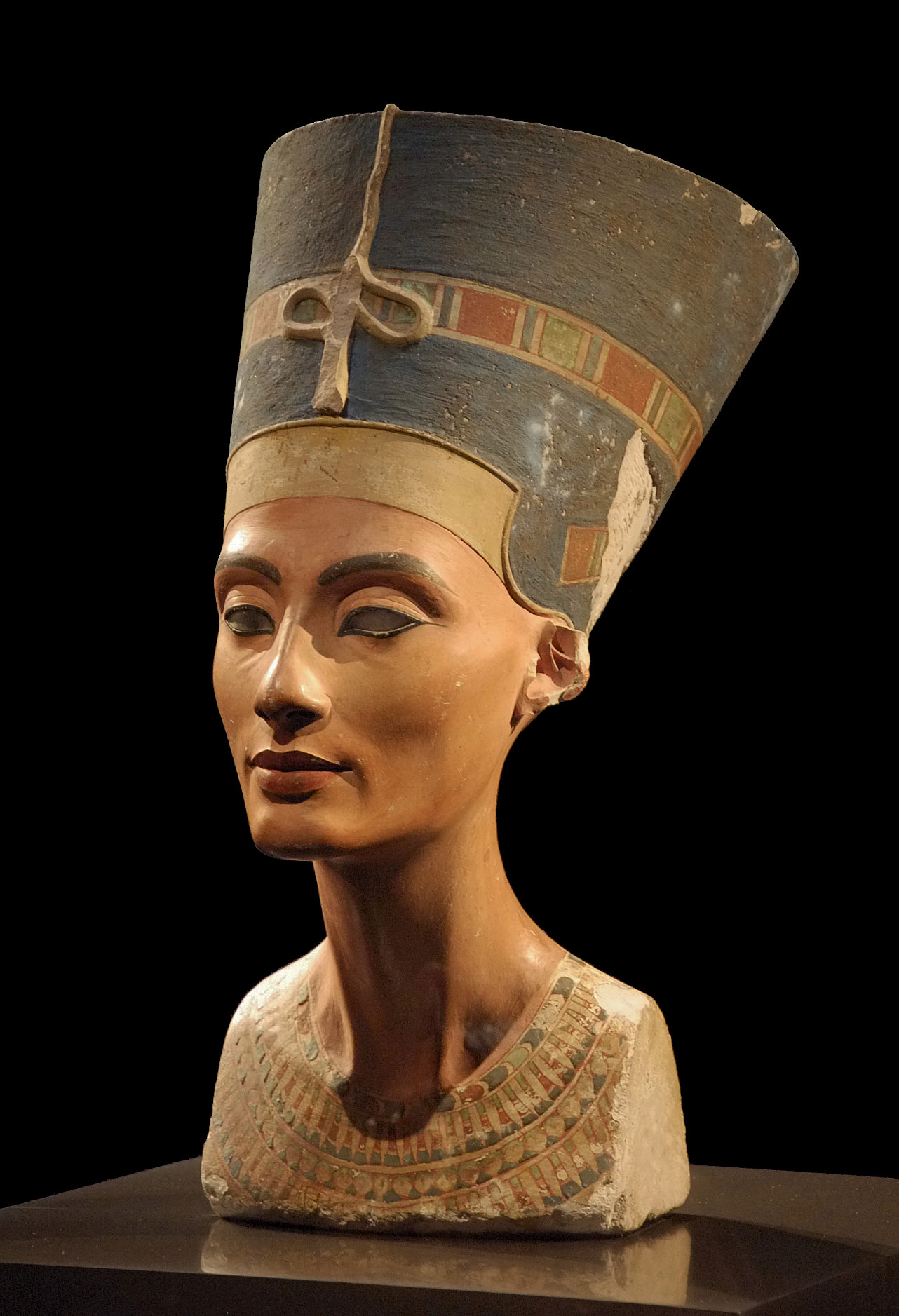
A bust of the Egyptian queen Nefertiti showing the use of eye liner made of kohl

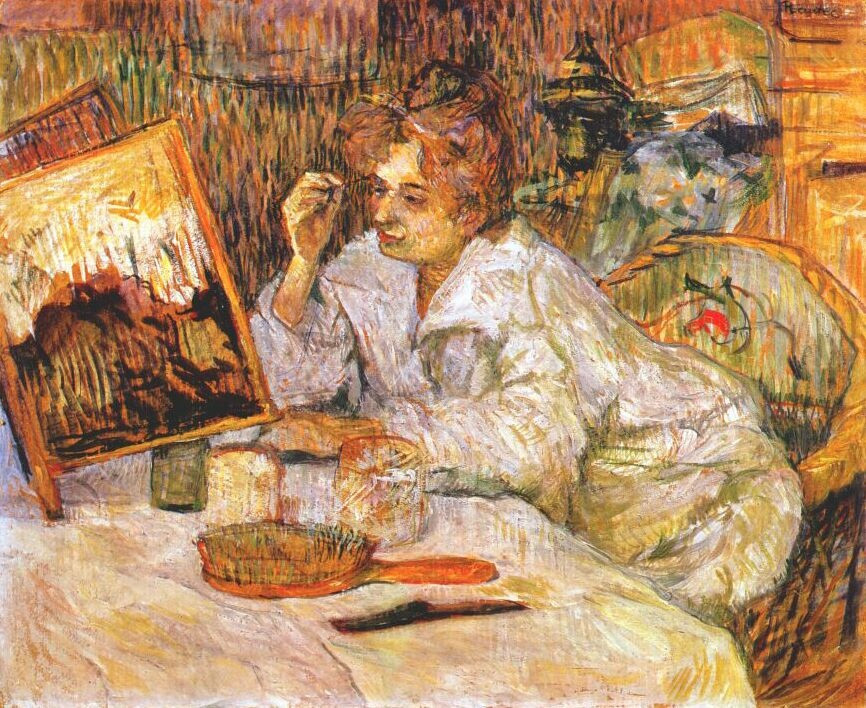
An 1889 Henri de Toulouse-Lautrec painting of a woman applying facial cosmetics

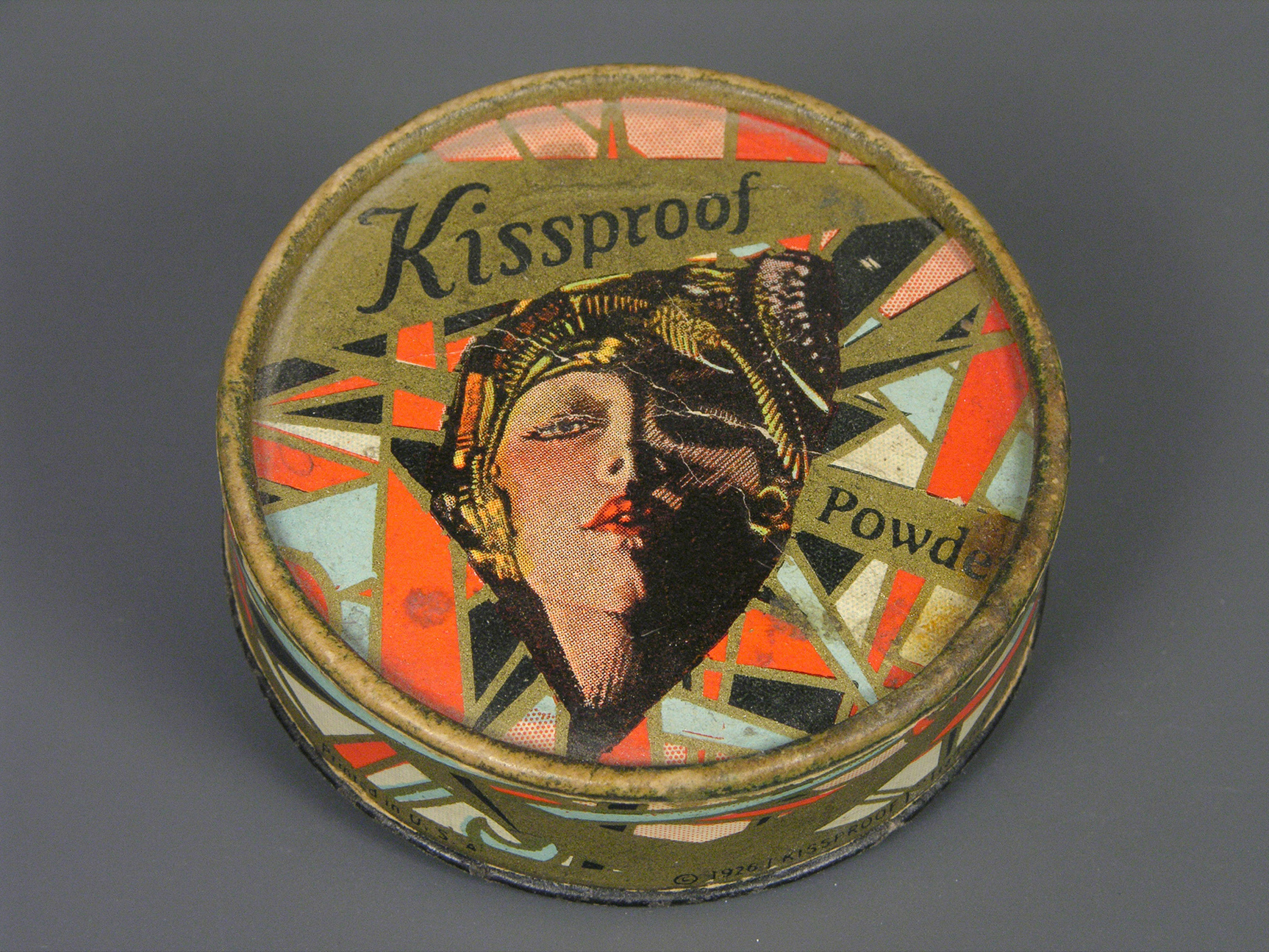
Kissproof brand face powder from 1926, from the permanent collection of the Museo del Objeto del Objeto in Mexico City

The word cosmetics is derived from the Greek κοσμητικὴ τέχνη (kosmetikē tekhnē), meaning "technique of dress and ornament," from κοσμητικός (kosmētikos), "skilled in ordering or arranging," and from κόσμος (kosmos), meaning "order" and "ornament.".

=== Legal definition ===
Though often referred to socially as makeup, cosmetics technically include substances used to clean or alter the complexion, skin, hair, or teeth—placing eye shadow, teeth-whitening strips, and perfumes under the same umbrella.

In the United States, the Food and Drug Administration (FDA), which regulates cosmetics, defines cosmetics as products "intended to be applied to the human body for cleansing, beautifying, promoting attractiveness, or altering the appearance without affecting the body's structure or functions." This broad definition includes any material intended for use as an ingredient in a cosmetic product, with the FDA specifically excluding pure soap from this category. A product can be considered both a cosmetic and a drug, depending on the intended use. This includes examples such as antidandruff shampoo and moisturizers marketed with sun-protection.

The European Union defines cosmetic products as "any substance or mixture intended to be placed in contact with the external parts of the human body (epidermis, hair system, nails, lips and external genital organs) or with the teeth and the mucous membranes of the oral cavity with a view exclusively or mainly to cleaning them, perfuming them, changing their appearance, protecting them, keeping them in good condition or correcting body odours;".

In Canada, cosmetics are defined as "any substance or mixture of substances, manufactured, sold or represented for use in cleansing, improving or altering the complexion, skin, hair or teeth and includes deodorants and perfumes." This list includes hand soap, unlike the FDA, and handmade cosmetics.

China has the most complicated legal definition of cosmetics, stating; "chemical products that are applied on the surface of any part of the human body (such as skin, hair, nails and lips) by smearing, spraying and other similar ways to keep the body hygiene, to get rid of undesirable odors, to protect the skin, to enhance the beauty of the appearance." Notably, all oral care products are excluded from this definition. Cosmetics are also split into two categories, special use and non-special use. Special use cosmetics, which includes hair products, deodorants, whitening products, sunscreen, and anti-aging products, has stricter regulations, and must have an administrative license in order to produce. Non-special use cosmetics are defined as "all other cosmetics not considered special use cosmetic”, and can be divided further into domestic and imported cosmetic products.

== Use ==
Cosmetics designed for skin care may be used to cleanse, exfoliate and protect the skin, as well as replenish it, using body lotions, cleansers, toners, serums, moisturizers, eye creams, retinol, and balms. Cosmetics designed for more general personal care, such as shampoo, soap, and body wash, can be used to clean the body. Cosmetics can also be designed to add fragrance to the body.

Cosmetics designed to enhance one's appearance (makeup) can be used to conceal blemishes, enhance one's natural features, or add color to a person's face. In some cases, more extreme forms of makeup are used for performances, fashion shows, and people in costume and can change the appearance of the face entirely to resemble a different person, creature, or object. Techniques for changing appearance include contouring, which aims to give shape to an area of the face. Some women have described peer pressure to use cosmetics resulting in objectification.

Products used for haircare, such as permanent waves, hair colors, and hairsprays, are classified as cosmetic products as well.

== History ==
Cosmetics have been in use for thousands of years, with ancient Egyptians and Sumerians using them. In Europe, the use of cosmetics continued into the Middle Ages—where the face was whitened and the cheeks rouged— Though attitudes towards cosmetics varied throughout time, the use of cosmetics was openly frowned upon at many points in Western history. Regardless of the changes in social attitudes towards cosmetics, many occasionally achieved ideals of appearance through cosmetics.

According to one source, early major developments in cosmetics include:

- Kohl used by ancient Egyptians
- Castor oil also used in ancient Egypt as a protective balm
- Skin creams made of beeswax, olive oil, and rose water, described by the Romans
- Vaseline and lanolin in the nineteenth century.

Historically, the absence of regulation of the manufacture and use of cosmetics, as well as the absence of scientific knowledge regarding the effects of various compounds on the human body for much of this time period, led to a number of negative effects upon those who used cosmetics, including deformities, blindness, and, in some cases, death. Although harmless products were used, such as berries and beetroot, many cosmetic products available at this time were still chemically dubious and even poisonous. Examples of the prevalent usage of harmful cosmetics include the use of ceruse (white lead) throughout a number of different cultures, such as during the Renaissance in the West, and blindness caused by the mascara Lash Lure during the early 20th century. During the 19th century, there were numerous incidents of lead poisoning due to the fashion for red and white lead makeup and powder, leading to swelling and inflammation of the eyes, weakened tooth enamel, and blackened skin, with heavy use known to lead to death. Usage of white lead was not confined only to the West, with the white Japanese face makeup known as oshiroi also produced using white lead. In the second part of the 19th century, scientific advances in the production of makeup led to the creation of makeup free of hazardous substances such as lead.

Throughout the late 19th and early 20th centuries, changes in the prevailing attitudes towards cosmetics led to a wider expansion of the cosmetics industry. In 1882, English actress and socialite Lillie Langtry became the poster girl for Pears of London, making her the first celebrity to endorse a commercial product. She allowed her name to be used on face powders and skin products. During the 1910s, the market in the US was developed by figures such as Elizabeth Arden, Helena Rubinstein, and Max Factor. These firms were joined by Revlon just before World War II and Estée Lauder just after. By the middle of the 20th century, cosmetics were in widespread use by women in nearly all industrial societies around the world, with the cosmetics industry becoming a multibillion-dollar enterprise by the beginning of the 21st century. The wider acceptance of the use of cosmetics led some to see makeup as a tool used in the oppression and subjection of women to unfair societal standards. In 1968, at the feminist Miss America protest, protesters symbolically threw a number of feminine products into a "Freedom Trash Can", with cosmetics among the items the protesters called "instruments of female torture" and accoutrements of what they perceived to be enforced femininity.

As of 2016, the world's largest cosmetics company is L'Oréal, founded by Eugène Schueller in 1909 as the Société Française de Teintures Inoffensives pour Cheveux (now owned by Liliane Bettencourt 26% and Nestlé 28%; the remaining 46% is traded publicly).

Although modern makeup has been traditionally used mainly by women, men also use makeup in order to enhance their own facial features or cover blemishes and dark circles. The negative stigma of men wearing makeup in countries such as the United States has weakened over the years, with the number of men using makeup increasing in the 21st century. Cosmetics brands have increasingly targeted men in the sale of cosmetics, with some products targeted specifically at men.

Lead has been used as a makeup product since the 18th century. It is said to be lethal to women who apply it daily to achieve a pale complexion, representing nobility, as tanned skin represents the working class. Lead can be detrimental to people's health and cause death if mixed with vinegar, which it allows lead to be absorbed through the skin.

== Types of cosmetics ==
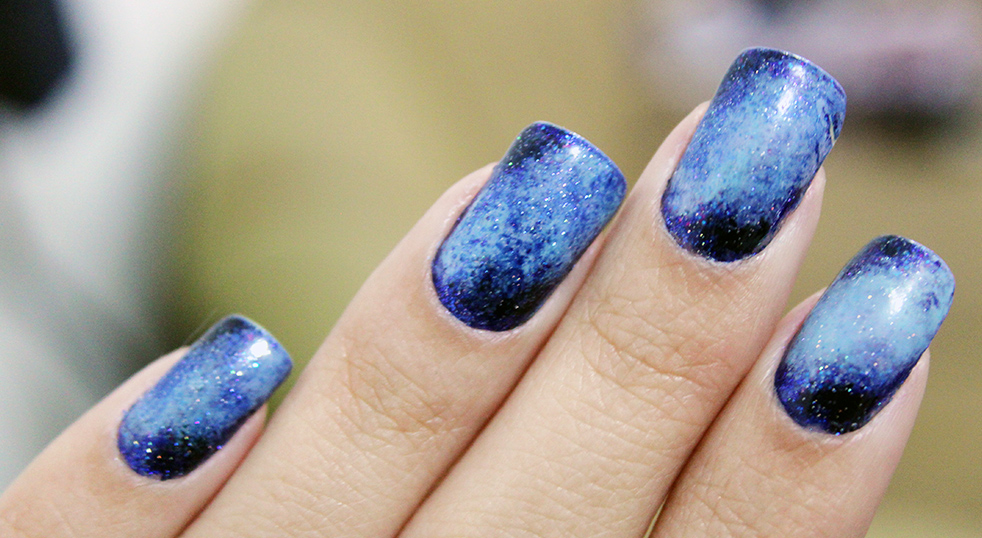
Nail art

Though there are a large number of different cosmetics used for a variety of different purposes, all cosmetics are typically intended to be applied externally. These products can be applied to the face (on the skin, lips, eyebrows, and eyes), to the body (on the skin, particularly the hands and nails), and to the hair. These products may be intended for use as skincare, personal care, or to alter the appearance, with the subset of cosmetics known as makeup primarily referring to products containing colour pigments intended for the purpose of altering the wearer's appearance; some manufacturers will distinguish only between "decorative" cosmetics intended to alter the appearance and "care" cosmetics designed for skincare and personal care.

Most cosmetics are also distinguished by the area of the body intended for application, with cosmetics designed to be used on the face and eye area usually applied with a brush, a makeup sponge, or the fingertips. Cosmetics can also be described by the physical composition of the product. Cosmetics can be liquid or cream emulsions, powders (pressed or loose), dispersions, or anhydrous creams or sticks.

=== Decorative ===
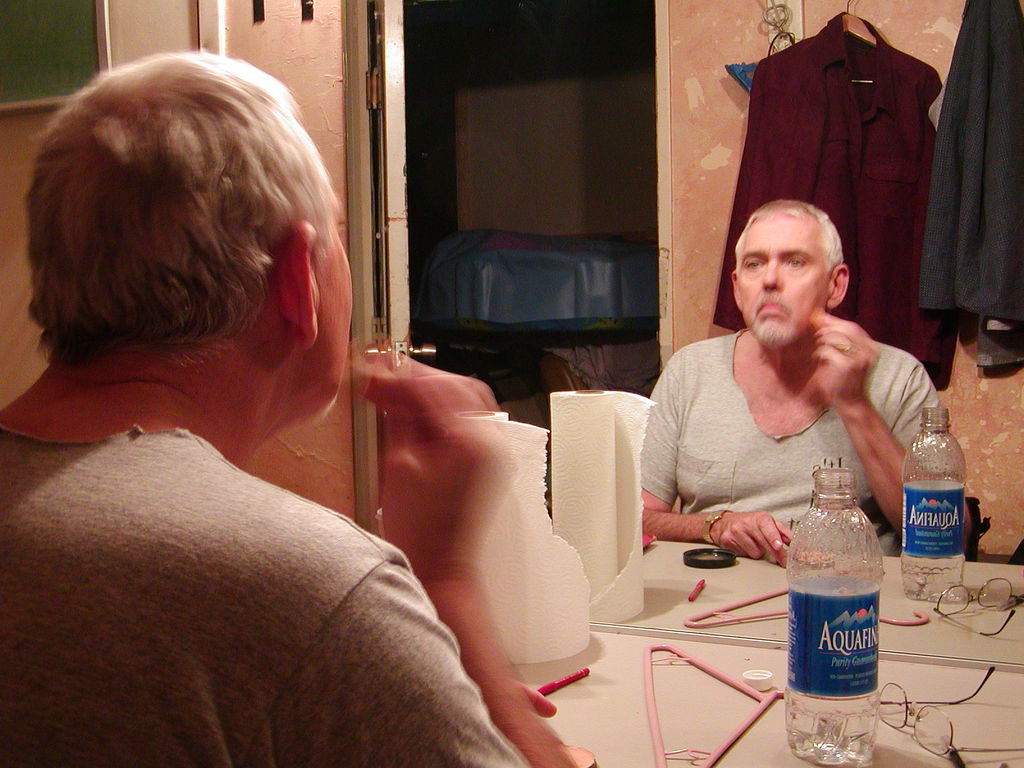
Broadway actor Jim Brochu applies makeup before the opening night of a play

- Primers are used on the face before makeup is applied, creating a typically transparent, smooth layer over the top of the skin, allowing for makeup to be applied smoothly and evenly. Some primers may also be tinted, and this tint may match the wearer's skin tone or may colour correct it, using greens, oranges, and purples to even out the wearer's skin tone and correct redness, purple shadows, or orange discolouration, respectively.
- Concealer is a cream or liquid product used to conceal marks or blemishes on the skin. Concealer is typically the colour of the user's skin tone and is generally applied after the face has been primed to even out the wearer's skin tone before foundation can be applied. Concealer is usually more heavily pigmented, has higher coverage, and is thicker than foundation or tinted primers. Though concealer is often more heavy duty in terms of pigment and consistency than foundation, a number of different formulations intended for different styles of use, such as a lighter concealer for the eyes and a heavier concealer for stage makeup, are available, as well as color-correcting concealers intended to balance out discolouration of the skin specifically.
- Foundation is a cream, liquid, mousse, or powder product applied to the entirety of the face to create a smooth and even base for the user's skin tone. Foundation provides a generally lower amount of coverage than concealer and is sold in formulations that can provide sheer, medium or full coverage to the skin, as well as different finishes such as matte, semi-matte and dewy.
- Rouge, blush, or blusher is a liquid, cream, or powder product applied to the centre of the cheeks intending to add or enhance their natural colour. Blushers are typically available in shades of pink and red or warm tan and brown and may also be used to make the cheekbones appear more defined.
- Bronzer is a powder, cream, or liquid product that adds colour to the skin, typically in bronze or tan shades, intended to give the skin a tanned appearance and enhance the colour of the face. Bronzer, like highlighter, may also contain substances providing a shimmer or glitter effect, and comes in either matte, semi-matte, satin, or shimmer finishes. Unlike bronzer, the purpose of contour is to help emphasize your facial features by adding depth.
- Highlighter is a liquid, cream, or powder product applied to the high points of the face, such as the eyebrows, nose, and cheekbones. Highlighter commonly has substances added, providing a shimmer or glitter effect. Alternatively, a lighter-toned foundation or concealer can be used as a highlighter.
- Eyebrow pencils, creams, waxes, gels, and powders are used to color, fill in, and define the brows. Eyebrow tinting treatments are also used to dye the eyebrow hairs a darker colour, either temporarily or permanently, without staining and colouring the skin underneath the eyebrows.
- Eyeshadow is a powder, cream, or liquid pigmented product used to draw attention to, accentuate, and change the shape of the area around the eyes, the eyelids, and the space below the eyebrows. Eyeshadow is typically applied using an eyeshadow brush with generally small and rounded bristles, though liquid and cream formulations may also be applied with the fingers. Eyeshadow is available in almost every colour, as well as being sold in a number of different finishes, ranging from matte finishes with sheer coverage to glossy, shimmery, and highly pigmented finishes. Many different colours and finishes of eyeshadow may be combined in one look and blended together to achieve different effects.
- Eyeliner is used to enhance and elongate the apparent size or depth of the eye. Though eyeliner is commonly black, it can come in many different colours. Eyeliner can come in the form of a pencil, a gel or a liquid.
- False eyelashes are used to extend, exaggerate, and add volume to the eyelashes. Consisting generally of a small strip to which hair—either human, mink, or synthetic—is attached, false eyelashes are typically applied to the lash line using glue, which can come in latex and latex-free varieties; magnetic false eyelashes, which attach to the eyelid after magnetic eyeliner is applied, are also available. Designs vary in length and colour, with rhinestones, gems, feathers, and lace available as false eyelash designs. False eyelashes are not permanent and can be easily taken off with the fingers. Eyelash extensions are a more permanent way to achieve this look. Each set lasts for two to three weeks, then the set can be filled, similar to the maintenance of acrylic nails. If this process is done correctly, no harm will be done to the natural eyelashes.
- Mascara is used to darken, lengthen, thicken, or enhance the eyelashes through the use of a typically thick, cream-like product applied with a spiral bristle mascara brush. Mascara is commonly black, brown, or clear, though a number of different colours, some containing glitter, are available. Mascara is typically advertised and sold in a number of different formulations that advertise qualities such as waterproofing, volume enhancement, length enhancement, and curl enhancement, and may be used in combination with an eyelash curler to enhance the natural curl of the eyelashes.
- Lip products, including lipstick, lip gloss, lip liner and lip balms, commonly add color and texture to the lips, as well as serving to moisturise the lips and define their external edges. Products adding colour and texture to the lips, such as lipsticks and lip glosses, often come in a wide range of colors as well as a number of different finishes, such as matte finishes and satin or glossy finishes. Other styles of lip coloration products, such as lip stains, temporarily saturate the lips with a dye and typically do not alter the texture of the lips. Both lip colour products and lip liners may be waterproof and may be applied directly to the lips, with a brush, or with the fingers. Lip balms, though designed to moisturise and protect the lips (such as through the addition of UV protection) may also tint the lips.
- Face powder, setting powder, or setting sprays are used to 'set' foundation or concealer, giving it a matte or consistent finish while also concealing small flaws or blemishes. Both powders and setting sprays claim to keep makeup from absorbing into the skin or melting off. While setting sprays are generally not tinted, setting powder and face powder can come in translucent or tinted varieties, and can be used to bake foundation in order for it to stay longer on the face. Tinted face powders may also be worn alone without foundation or concealer to give an extremely sheer coverage base.
- Nail polish is a liquid used to colour the fingernails and toenails. Transparent, colorless nail polishes may be used to strengthen nails or be used as a top or base coat to protect the nail or nail polish. Nail polish, like eyeshadow, is available in many colours and a number of different finishes, including matte, shimmer, glossy and crackle finishes.

=== Skincare ===
Cleansing is a standard step in skin care routines. Skin cleansing includes some or all of these steps or cosmetics:

- Cleansers or foaming washes are used to remove excess dirt, oil, and makeup left on the skin. Different cleansing products are aimed at various types of skin, such as sulfate-free cleansers and spin brushes.
  - Cleansing oil, or oil cleanser, is an oil-based solution that gently emulsifies the skin's natural oils and removes makeup. Cleansing oils are typically used as part of a two-step cleansing process. After the skin has been cleansed with an oil cleanser, a second cleanse is done using a mild gel, milk or cream cleanser to ensure any traces of the oil cleanser and makeup are removed.
- Toners are used after cleansing to remove any remaining traces of cleanser and restore the pH of the skin. They may also add some hydration. They are usually applied to a cotton pad and wiped over the skin, but they can be sprayed onto the skin from a spray bottle or poured onto the hand and patted directly onto the skin. Toners usually contain water, citric acid, herbal extracts, and other ingredients. Witch hazel is still commonly used in toners to tighten the pores and refresh the skin. Alcohol is used less often as it is drying and can be irritating to the skin. It may still be found in toners, especially for those with oily skin. Some toners contain active ingredients and target particular skin types, such as tea tree oil, salicylic acid, or glycolic acid.
- Hyperpigmentation treatment: Kojic acid soap, cream, or powder, and Arbutin (a b-D-glucopyranoside derivative of hydroquinone) serum or cream help get rid of hyperpigmentation spots of the skin.
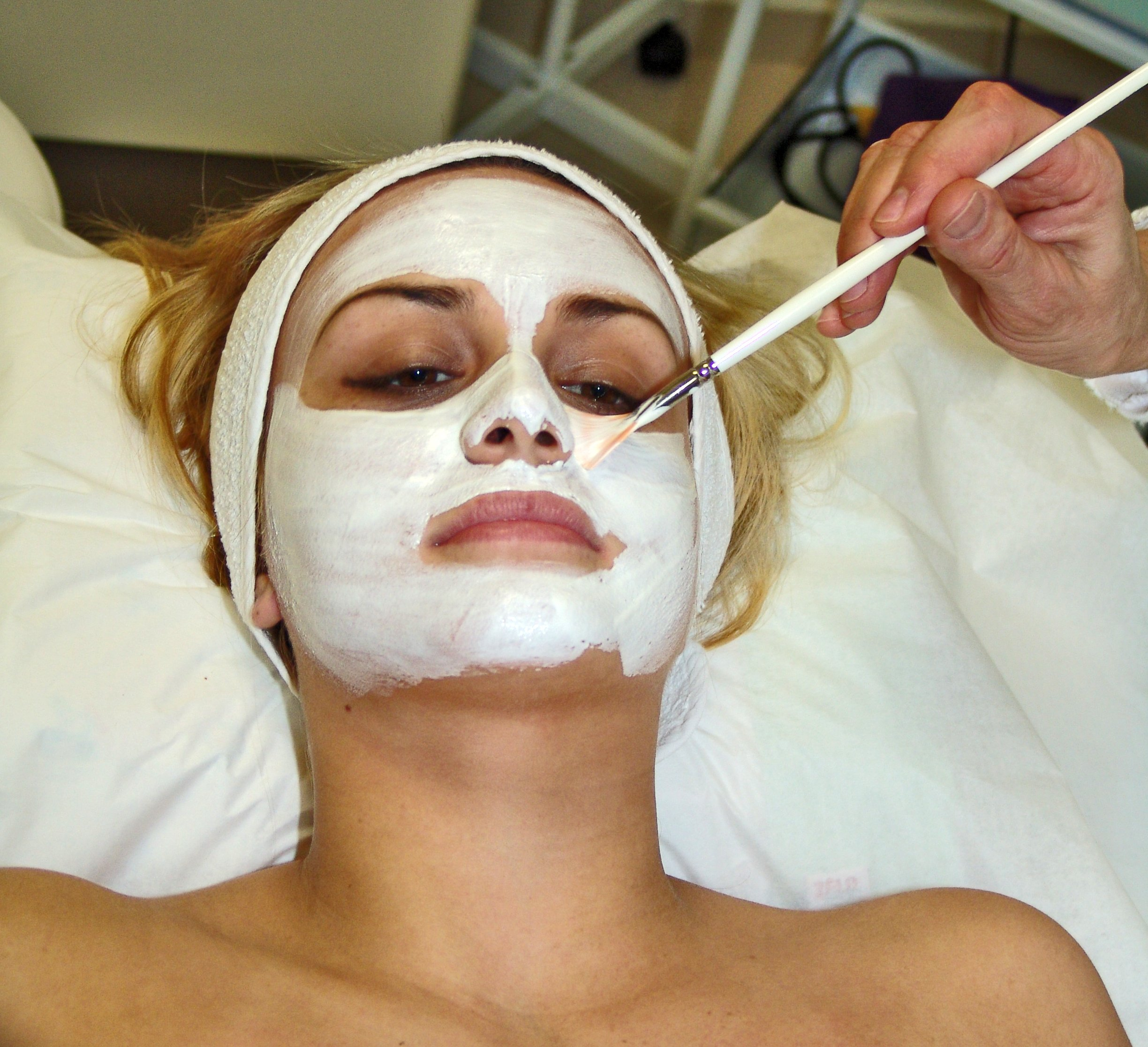
  A woman using a facial mask
- Facial masks are treatments applied to the skin and then removed. Typically, they are applied to a dry, cleansed face, avoiding the eyes and lips.
  - Clay-based masks use kaolin clay or fuller's earth to transport essential oils and chemicals to the skin and are typically left on until completely dry. As the clay dries, it absorbs excess oil and dirt from the surface of the skin and may help to clear blocked pores or draw comedones to the surface. Because of their drying actions, clay-based masks should only be used on oily skins.
  - Peel masks are typically gel-like in consistency and contain acids or exfoliating agents to help exfoliate the skin, along with other ingredients to hydrate, discourage wrinkles, or treat uneven skin tone. They are left on to dry and then gently peeled off. They should be avoided by people with dry or sensitive skin because this type of skin tends to be very drying.
  - Sheet masks are a relatively new product that is becoming extremely popular in Asia. Sheet masks consist of a thin cotton or fiber sheet with holes cut out for the eyes and lips and cut to fit the contours of the face, onto which serums and skin treatments are brushed in a thin layer; the sheets may be soaked in the treatment. Masks are available to suit almost all skin types and skin complaints. Sheet masks are quicker, less messy, and require no specialized knowledge or equipment for their use compared to other types of face masks, but they may be difficult to find and purchase outside Asia.
- Exfoliants are products that help slough off dead skin cells from the topmost layer of the skin to improve the appearance of the skin. This is achieved either by using mild acids or other chemicals to loosen old skin cells or lightly abrasive substances to physically remove them. Exfoliation can also help even out patches of rough skin, improve cell turnover, clear blocked pores to discourage acne, and improve the appearance and healing of scars.
  - Chemical exfoliants include azelaic acid, citric acid, acetic acid, malic acid, mandelic acid, glycolic acid, lactic acid, salicylic acid, papain, and bromelain. They may be found in cleansers, scrubs, and peels, but also leave-on products such as toners, serums, and moisturisers. Chemical exfoliants mainly fall into the categories of AHAs, BHAs, PHAs or enzymes.
  - Abrasive exfoliants include gels, creams or lotions, as well as physical objects.
- Moisturizers are creams or lotions that hydrate the skin and help it to retain moisture. Typical components are polyols such as glycerol and sorbitol as well as partially hydrolyzed proteins. Tinted moisturizers contain a small amount of foundation, which can provide light coverage for minor blemishes or to even out skin tones. They are usually applied with the fingertips or a cotton pad.
- Eyes require a different kind of moisturizer compared with the rest of the face. The skin around the eyes is extremely thin and sensitive, and it is often the first area to show signs of aging. Eye creams are typically very light lotions or gels and are usually very gentle; some may contain ingredients such as caffeine or Vitamin K to reduce puffiness and dark circles under the eyes. Eye creams or gels should be applied over the entire eye area with a finger, using a patting motion. Finding a moisturizer with SPF is beneficial to prevent aging and wrinkles.
- Sunscreens are creams, lotions, sprays, gels, sticks, or other topical projects that protect the skin from the sun. They contain organic or inorganic filters that act to absorb or reflect harmful UV radiation. Sunscreens are marked with 'spf', which means 'sun protection factor.' This shows that a product provides protection against UVB. UVA ratings on sunscreens can be denoted by the number of stars or plus symbols varying among countries. UVA ratings do not specifically depict the amount of UVA protection a sunscreen is providing but rather the ratio of equal UVA and UVB protection. The recommended 'gold standard' of a sunscreen should be at least SPF 30 and at least 4 stars or plus symbols. Daily sunscreen application is very important, but use of shade, clothing, and hats are as important and more effective for sun protection.
- Serums are light, easily absorbed liquids that one spreads on their skin. The main purpose of the product is to be applied before moisturizer, and the serum provides a high concentration of any specific ingredient on the face. The benefits of serum are skin firmness, smoothness of the face, and reduction of the fine lines and wrinkles on one's face.

=== Hair care ===
Hair care is a category of cosmetics devoted to products which are used to improve the appearance of hair.

- Shampoos are used to clean the hair and scalp by massaging into wet hair and then rinsing.
- Hair conditioners are used following shampoo to improve the appearance of hair by making it smoother and shinier.
- Styling products include gels, waxes, foams, creams, mousse, serum and pomades; they are used to create and maintain hairstyles.
- Hair oil is a product to help with hair growth, damage, and dryness. It protects the cuticle and hair follicle from external damage and maintains moisture.
- Hair dye is used to change the color of hair. There are semi-permanent and permanent hair dyes.

== Perfume ==
Perfumes or fragrances, are liquids that can be sprayed or applied to produce a long-lasting smell. They are created by mixing different compounds together. There are different groups of perfumes which are categorised according to their concentration.

- Parfum
- Eau de parfum
- Eau de toilette

The difference between Eau de parfum and Eau de toilette is more about the perfume oil concentration. Eau de parfum has a higher concentration of perfume than Eau de toilette.

== Tools ==
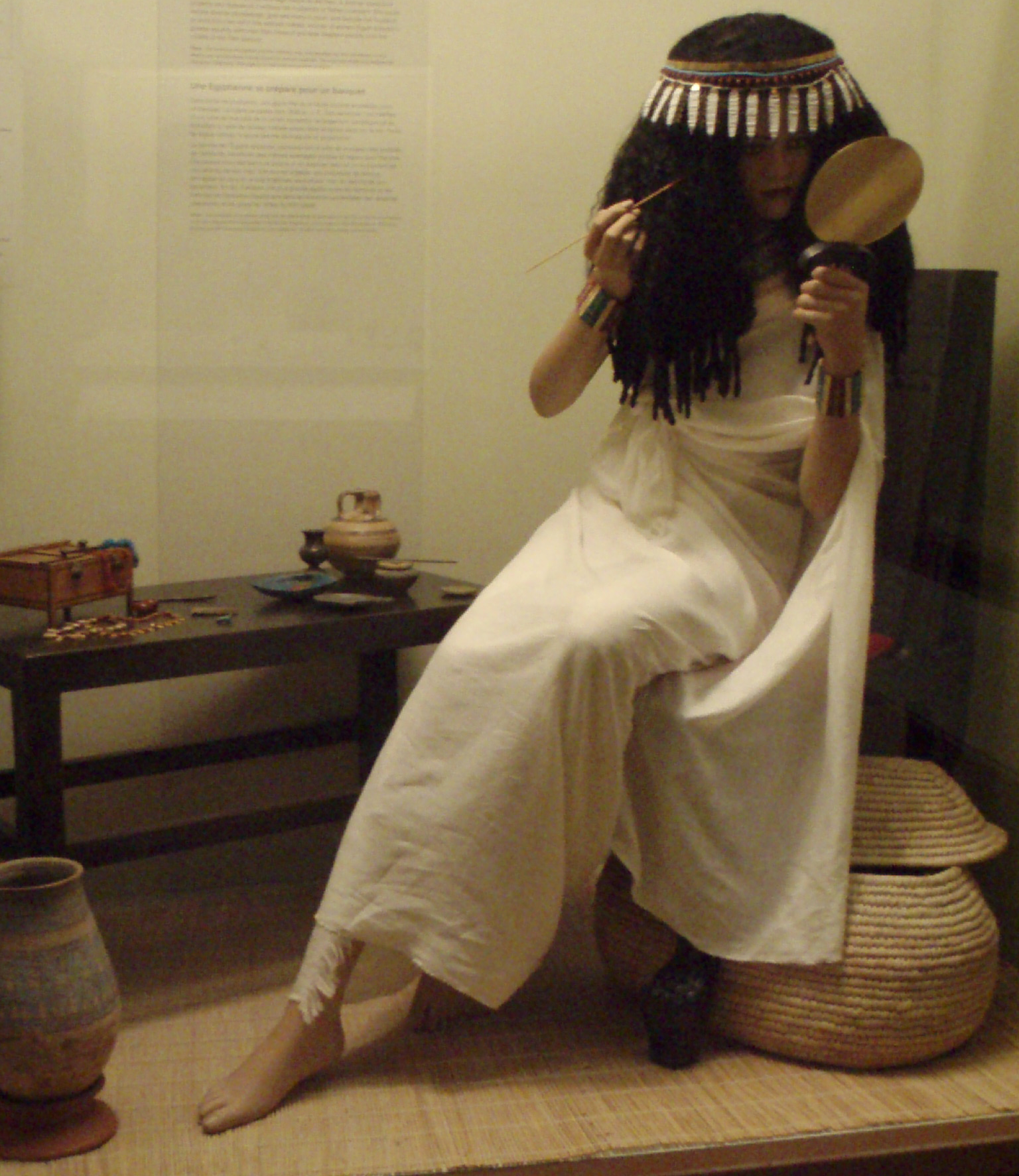
Depiction of an ancient Egyptian woman applying makeup in a display at the Royal Ontario Museum, Canada.

Various tools are used to apply cosmetics.

=== Brushes ===
- A makeup brush is used to apply makeup to the face. There are two types of makeup brushes: synthetic and natural. Synthetic brushes are best for cream products, while natural brushes are ideal for powder products. Using the appropriate brush to apply a certain product allows the product to blend into the skin smoothly and evenly.
- A foundation brush is usually a dense brush that distributes the product evenly while smoothing out the face. This brush is best used to achieve full coverage.
- A concealer brush has a small, tapered tip that allows for precise spot correction, such as blemishes or discoloration.
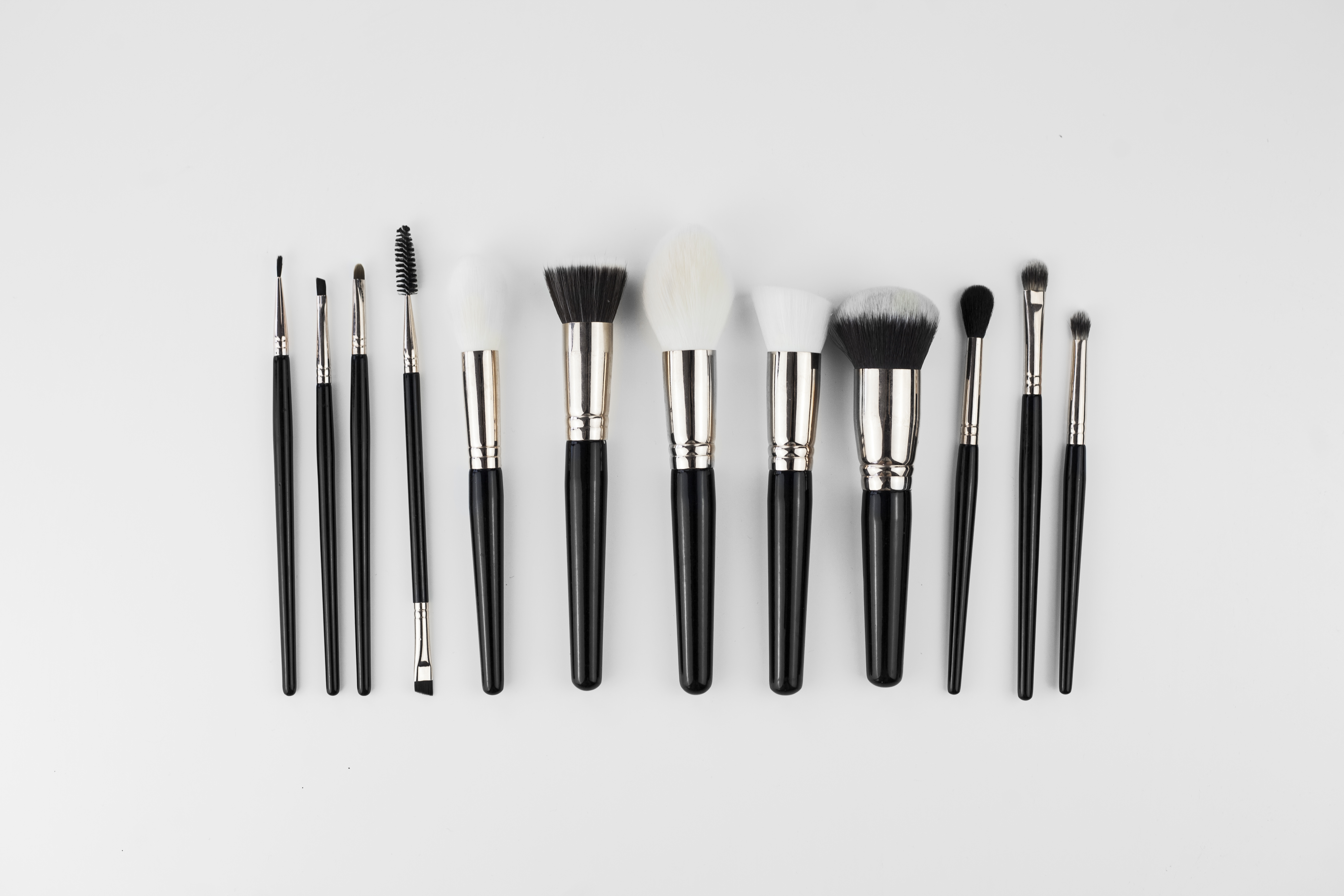
  An assortment of different makeup brushes used for different cosmetics.
- A stippling brush has soft, synthetic bristles that give an airbrushed effect. This brush is best used to achieve light to medium coverage.
- A blush brush comes in all shapes and sizes and is used to apply blush, allowing the blush to look natural while giving a flush of color.
- A powder brush tends to be big and fluffy for quick and easy application of dusting powder all over the face. Powder gives the appearance of a matte effect.
- A bronzer brush, which can also serve as a contour brush, is an angled brush that gives the face dimensions and illusions by allowing the makeup to be placed in place of bone structure. This brush can also be used to add a shimmering highlight illusion to the cheekbones, nose and chin.
- A highlight brush, also known as a fan brush, has bristles that are typically spread out and is used to apply where the sun would naturally hit.
- An eyeshadow brush is a dense brush that allows shadow to be packed onto the eyelid.
- A blending eyeshadow brush is used to blend out any harsh lines you may have from the eyeshadow and can soften the eyeshadow look.
- An eyeliner brush is tapered with an extra-fine tip used for gel eyeliners, which allows precision to line the eyes.
- A spoolie is used to brush out the eyebrows and can also be used as a mascara wand.
- A lip brush is small to ensure precision and is used to apply lipstick evenly onto the lips.
- An eyebrow brush is tapered and slanting from the top, which tends to define the eyebrows and fill in the empty spaces between brows, to give them a fuller and denser look.
- A Kabuki brush is used to apply any sort of powder makeup to large surfaces of the face (loose powder, foundation, face powder, blush, bronzer). This brush is used to even the skin's appearance.

=== Other applicators ===
In addition to brushes, a makeup sponge is a popular applicator. Makeup sponges can be used to apply foundation, blend concealer, and apply powder or highlighter.

Loofahs, microfiber cloths, natural sponges, or brushes may be used to exfoliate skin simply by rubbing them over the face in a circular motion. Gels, creams, or lotions may contain an acid to encourage dead skin cells to loosen, and an abrasive such as microbeads, sea salt and sugar, ground nut shells, rice bran, or ground apricot kernels to scrub the dead cells off the skin. Salt and sugar scrubs tend to be the harshest, while scrubs containing beads or rice bran are typically very gentle.

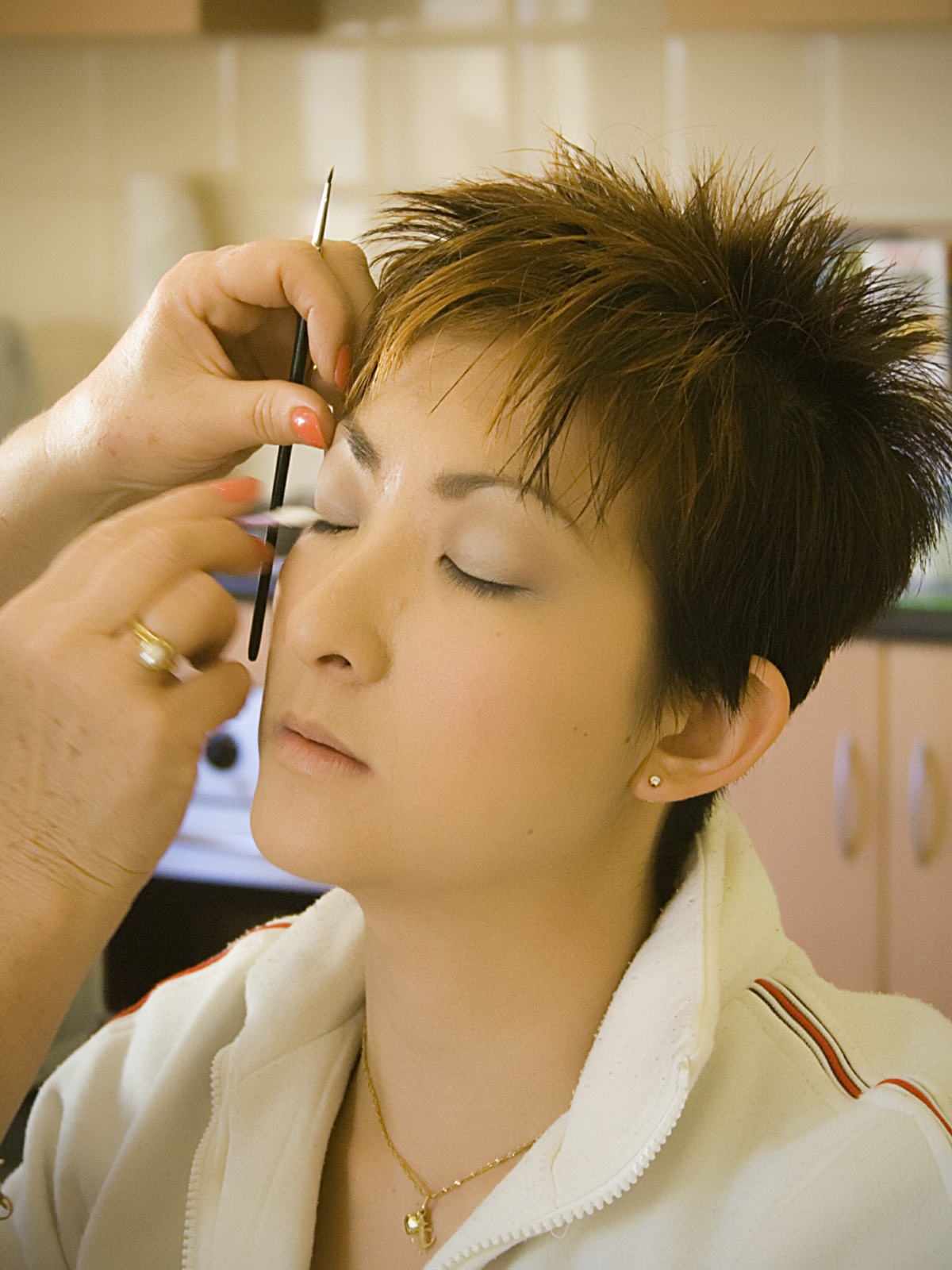
Eyeshadow being applied

== Ingredients ==
A variety of organic compounds and inorganic compounds comprise typical cosmetics. Typical organic compounds are modified natural oils and fats, as well as a variety of petrochemically derived agents. Inorganic compounds are processed minerals such as iron oxides, talc, and zinc oxide. The oxides of zinc and iron are classified as pigments, i.e., colorants that have no solubility in solvents. Cosmetic companies have become more transparent in the ingredients of their products because consumers are interested in the formula of their products. The rise of "clean cosmetics" movement has led to more examination of ingredients in cosmetics from consumers. As a result of concerns about potential health risks associated with certain ingredients found in cosmetics, many brands have begun to formulate new products without these ingredients. This had started to lead to a new movement of "clean cosmetics." Studies have shown that women of color are disproportionally exposed to harmful ingredients in cosmetics because certain beauty products are marketed towards women of color, and these products with harmful ingredients tend to be used more often in their community.

=== Ingredient labelling ===
In the European Union, the United States, and several other jurisdictions, cosmetic ingredients must be declared on product packaging using standardized ingredient names, primarily based on the [International Nomenclature of Cosmetic Ingredients] (INCI). Under both EU and US regulations, ingredients are listed in descending order of weight at the time of addition. Ingredients present at concentrations of less than 1% may be listed in any order after those present at or above 1%, and color additives may be listed in any order after other ingredients.

Because of these rules, the order of ingredients indicates relative concentration only for substances above the 1% threshold; below this level, the sequence does not reflect relative amounts. Furthermore, the presence of an ingredient in a cosmetic formulation does not indicate its exact concentration or whether it is present at an efficacious level.

Fragrance and aromatic mixtures are often declared collectively rather than by listing individual components. In the United States, fragrance ingredients may generally be designated collectively as "fragrance". In the European Union, they may be declared collectively as "parfum", but specified fragrance allergens must be identified individually if their concentration exceeds 0.001% in leave-on products or 0.01% in rinse-off products. The list of individual allergens requiring declaration was expanded by Commission Regulation (EU) 2023/1545, with transition deadlines taking effect for new products placed on the EU market from 31 July 2026 and for all products on the market from 31 July 2028.

=== Natural ===
Handmade and certified organic products are becoming more mainstream due to consumer concerns that certain chemicals in some skincare products may be harmful if absorbed through the skin. The FDA, which regulates the US cosmetic industry, says, "FDA has not defined the term "natural" and has not established a regulatory definition for this term in cosmetic labeling." It goes on to warn consumers, "choosing ingredients from sources you consider "organic" or "natural" is no guarantee that they are safe."

=== Mineral ===
The term "mineral makeup" applies to a category of face makeup, including foundation, eye shadow, blush, and bronzer, made with loose, dry mineral powders. These powders are often mixed with oil-water emulsions. Lipsticks, liquid foundations, and other liquid cosmetics, as well as compressed makeups such as eye shadow and blush in compacts, are often called mineral makeup if they have the same primary ingredients as dry mineral makeups. Liquid makeups must contain preservatives, and compressed makeups must contain binders, which dry mineral makeups do not. Mineral makeup usually does not contain synthetic fragrances, preservatives, parabens, mineral oil, or chemical dyes. For this reason, dermatologists may consider mineral makeup to be gentler on the skin than makeup that contains those ingredients. Some minerals are nacreous or pearlescent, giving the skin a shining or sparking appearance. One example is bismuth oxychloride. There are various mineral-based makeup brands, including Bare Minerals, Tarte, Bobbi Brown, and Stila.

=== Microplastics ===
Cosmetic products can contain micro- or nanoplastics, either as ingredients or as contaminants from packaging or production. Microplastics are intentionally added for texture enhancement, illuminating effects on the skin, product stabilisation or as an ingredient carrier. Because most cosmetic products are applied on the face, hands or scalp, which are on average more humid than other body regions, the plastic particles can enter the body easily through hair follicles, sweat glands or abrasions. Microplastics can then have severe health outcomes on the skin, including inflammation, allergy development or even an increased risk of carcinogenesis. On a molecular level, micro- nad nanoplastics can disturb communication pathways in cells by binding proteins or changing their secondary or tertiary structure.

== Packaging ==
The term cosmetic packaging is used for primary packaging and secondary packaging of cosmetic products.

Primary packaging, also called cosmetic containers, houses the cosmetic product. It is in direct contact with the cosmetic product. Secondary packaging is the outer wrapping of one or several cosmetic container(s). An important difference between primary and secondary packaging is that any information that is necessary to clarify the safety of the product must appear on the primary package. Otherwise, much of the required information can appear on just the secondary packaging.

Cosmetic packaging is standardized by ISO 22715, set by the International Organization for Standardization and regulated by national or regional regulations such as those issued by the EU or the FDA. Marketers and manufacturers of cosmetic products must be compliant with these regulations to be able to market their cosmetic products in the corresponding areas of jurisdiction.

== Industry ==
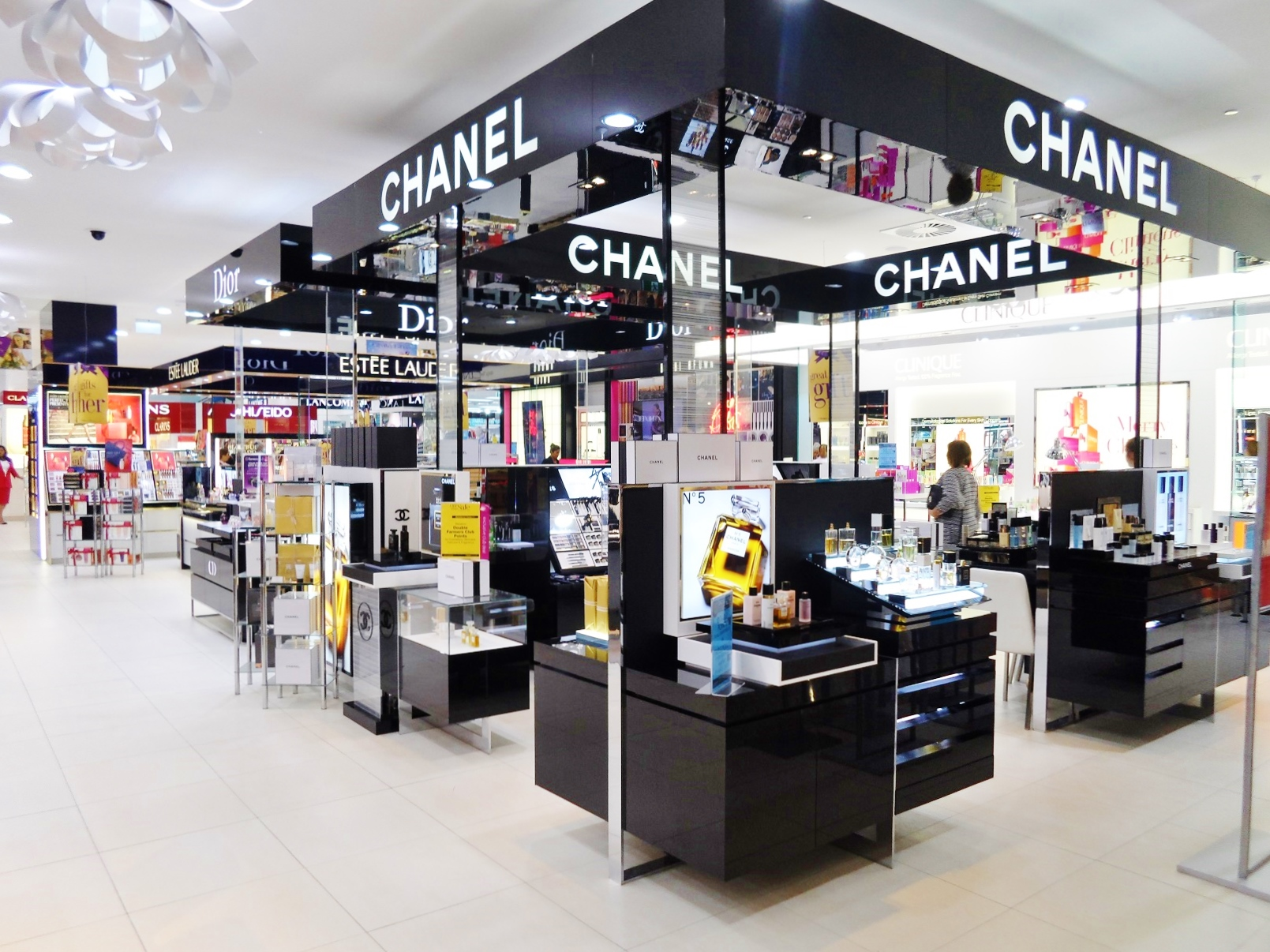
Cosmetics at department store Farmers Centre Place in Hamilton, New Zealand

The manufacture of cosmetics is dominated by a small number of multinational corporations that originated in the early 20th century, but the distribution and sales of cosmetics are spread among a wide range of businesses. The world's largest cosmetic companies are L'Oréal, Procter & Gamble, Unilever, Shiseido, and Estée Lauder. In 2005, the market volume of the cosmetics industry in the US, Europe, and Japan was about EUR 70 Billion/a year. In Germany, the cosmetic industry generated €12.6 billion of retail sales in 2008, which makes the German cosmetic industry the third largest in the world, after Japan and the United States. German exports of cosmetics reached €5.8 billion in 2008, whereas imports of cosmetics totaled €3 billion.

The worldwide cosmetics and perfume industry currently generates an estimated annual turnover of US$170 billion (according to Eurostaf, May 2007). Europe is the leading market, representing approximately €63 billion, while sales in France reached €6.5 billion in 2006, according to FIPAR (Fédération des Industries de la Parfumerie – the French federation for the perfume industry). France is another country in which the cosmetic industry plays an important role, both nationally and internationally. According to data from 2008, the cosmetic industry has grown constantly in France for 40 consecutive years. In 2006, this industrial sector reached a record level of €6.5 billion. Famous cosmetic brands produced in France include Vichy, Yves Saint Laurent, Yves Rocher, and many others.

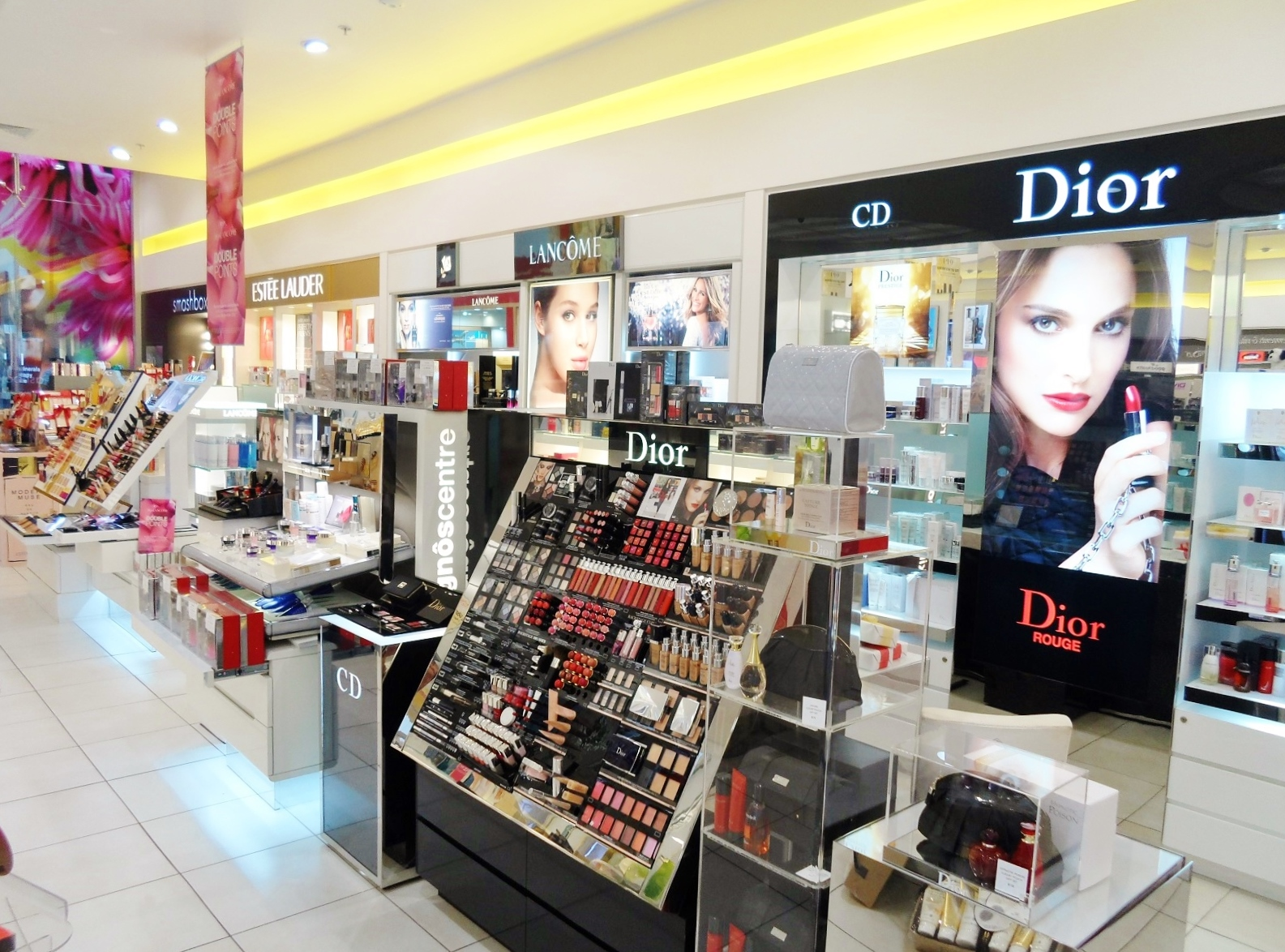
Cosmetics at Life Pharmacy at Westfield Albany on the North Shore of Auckland, New Zealand

The Italian cosmetic industry is also an important player in the European cosmetic market. Although not as large as in other European countries, the cosmetic industry in Italy was estimated to reach €9 billion in 2007. The Italian cosmetic industry is dominated by hair and body products and not makeup as in many other European countries. In Italy, hair and body products make up approximately 30% of the cosmetic market. Makeup and facial care are the most common cosmetic products exported to the United States.

According to Euromonitor International, the market for cosmetics in China is expected to be $7.4 billion in 2021 up from $4.3 billion in 2016. The increase is due to social media and the changing attitudes of people in the 18-to-30-year age bracket.

Due to the popularity of cosmetics, especially fragrances, many designers who are not necessarily involved in the cosmetic industry came up with perfumes bearing their names. Moreover, some actors and singers (such as Celine Dion) have their own perfume line. Designer perfumes are, like any other designer products, the most expensive in the industry as the consumer pays for the product and the brand. Famous Italian fragrances are produced by Giorgio Armani, Dolce & Gabbana, and others.

Procter & Gamble, which sells CoverGirl and Dolce & Gabbana makeup, funded a study, concluding that makeup makes women seem more competent. Due to the source of funding, the quality of this Boston University study is questioned.

Cosmetic products may be retailed in beauty stores, department stores and hypermarkets, drugstores, variety stores, grocery stores, beauty supply stores, and many other formats, and in similar types of online stores or the online presence of these types of physical stores.

Beauty brands have helped shape perceptions of beauty while global firms have also had to respond to diverse lifestyles in new markets. They have changed their traditional methods of marketing by using social media influencers and brand ambassadors to market their products.

== Safety evaluation ==
In the United States, cosmetic products and ingredients do not need FDA premarket approval, with the exception of color additives, but manufacturers are required to assure safety of the products. The EU and other regulatory agencies around the world also have stringent regulations. The FDA provides surveillance of cosmetics products, and exercises enforcement against companies that break manufacturing, labeling or marketing laws on cosmetic products, such as by issuing warning letters to companies making unapproved health claims.

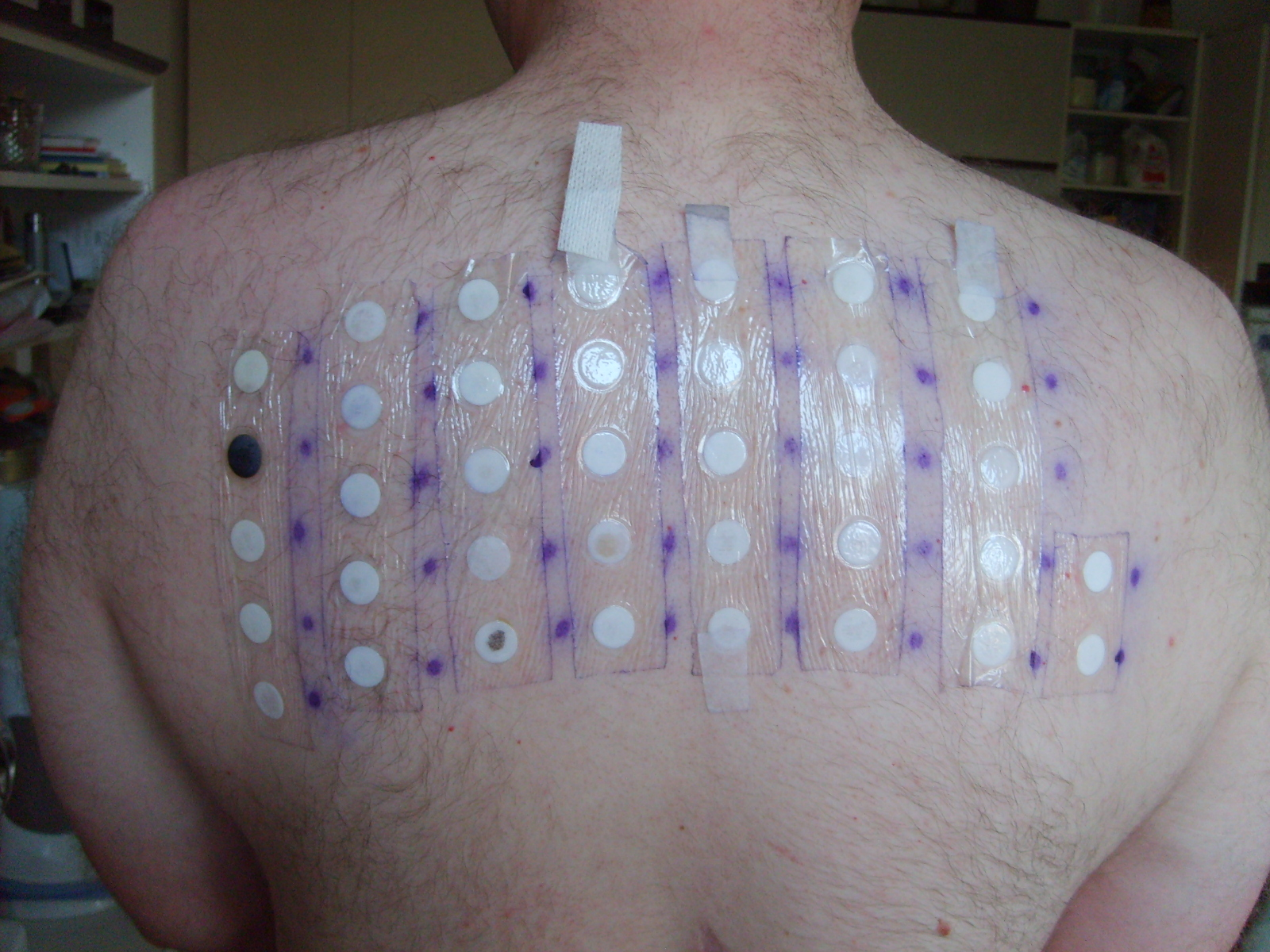
Patch test

Perfumes are widely used in consumer products. Studies concluded from patch testing show fragrances contain some ingredients which may cause allergic reactions. Fragrances and essential oils remain one of the main cause of contact allergens in cosmetics. Other cosmetic ingredients, including some emulsifiers and surfactants, can also cause allergic reactions.

Many cosmetic products contain fragrances or preservatives, and both ingredient groups can cause allergic contact dermatitis. Balsam of Peru was the main recommended marker for perfume allergy before 1977, it is still advised. The presence of Balsam of Peru in a cosmetic will be denoted by the INCI term Myroxylon pereirae. In some instances, Balsam of Peru is listed on the ingredient label of a product by one of its various names, but it may not be required to be listed by its name by mandatory labeling conventions (in fragrances, for example, it may simply be covered by an ingredient listing of "fragrance").

=== Animal testing ===
Due to ethical concerns around animal testing, some nations have required evidence for safety that may involve animal testing for cosmetics. Cosmetics manufacturers are encouraged to ensure safe products, having responsibility to establish the safety of individual ingredients and the final product before going to market. When animal testing is used by a company, a national regulatory agency, such as the US FDA, encourages minimal use of animals and humane methods, also supporting that scientifically valid alternative methods to whole-animal testing be used.

As of 2019, an estimated 50–100 million animals were tested each year in locations such as the United States and China. Such tests may have involved eye and skin irritants, phototoxicity (toxicity triggered by ultraviolet light), and mutagenicity. In 2018, California banned the sale of animal-tested cosmetics.

Cosmetics testing is banned in the Netherlands, India, Norway, Israel, New Zealand, Belgium, and the UK. In 2002, the European Union agreed to phase in a near-total ban on the sale of animal-tested cosmetics throughout the EU from 2009 and to ban all cosmetics-related animal testing. In December 2009, the European Parliament and Council passed EC Regulation 1223/2009 on cosmetics, a bill to regulate the cosmetic industry in the EU. EC Regulation 1223/2009 took effect on July 11, 2013. In March 2013, the EU banned the import and sale of cosmetics containing ingredients tested on animals. China required animal testing on cosmetic products until 2014, when they waived animal testing requirements for domestically produced products. In 2019, China approved nine non-animal testing methods, and in 2020 laws making animal testing compulsory were lifted.

In June 2017, legislation was proposed in Australia to end animal testing in the cosmetics industry. In March 2019, the Australian Senate passed a bill that banned the use of data from animal testing in the cosmetic industry since July 1, 2020.

== Legislation ==
=== Europe ===
In the European Union, the manufacture, labelling, and supply of cosmetics and personal care products are regulated by Regulation EC 1223/2009. It applies to all the countries of the EU as well as Iceland, Norway, and Switzerland. This regulation applies to single-person companies making or importing just one product as well as to large multinationals. Manufacturers and importers of cosmetic products must comply with the applicable regulations in order to sell their products in the EU. In this industry, it is common to fall back on a suitably qualified person, such as an independent third party inspection and testing company, to verify the cosmetics' compliance with the requirements of applicable cosmetic regulations and other relevant legislation, including REACH, GMP, hazardous substances, etc.

In the European Union, the circulation of cosmetic products and their safety have been the subject of legislation since 1976. One of the newest improvements to the regulation concerning the cosmetic industry is the ban on animal testing. Testing cosmetic products on animals has been illegal in the European Union since September 2004, and testing the separate ingredients of such products on animals is also prohibited by law, since March 2009 for some endpoints and full since 2013.

Cosmetic regulations in Europe are often updated to follow the trends of innovations and new technologies while ensuring product safety. For instance, all annexes of Regulation 1223/2009 were aimed at addressing potential risks to human health. Under the EU cosmetic regulation, manufacturers, retailers, and importers of cosmetics in Europe will be designated as "responsible persons.". This new status implies that the responsible person has the legal liability to ensure that the cosmetics and brands they manufacture or sell comply with the current cosmetic regulations and norms. The responsible person is also responsible for the documents contained in the Product Information File (PIF), a list of product information including data such as Cosmetic Product Safety Report, product description, GMP statement, or product function.

=== United States ===
In 1938, the U.S. passed the Food, Drug, and Cosmetic Act authorizing the Food and Drug Administration (FDA) to oversee safety via legislation in the cosmetic industry and its aspects in the United States. The FDA joined with 13 other federal agencies in forming the Interagency Coordinating Committee on the Validation of Alternative Methods (ICCVAM) in 1997, which was intended to ban animal testing and find other methods to test cosmetic products, although regulations in 2022 permit animal testing as a method to ensure safe use for consumers.

The current law on cosmetics in the U.S. does not require cosmetic products and ingredients to have FDA approval before going on the market, except for color additives. The Cosmetic Safety Enhancement Act was introduced in December 2019.

=== Brazil ===
ANVISA (Agência Nacional de Vigilância Sanitária, Brazilian Health Surveillance Agency) is the regulatory body responsible for cosmetic legislation and directives in the country. The rules apply to manufacturers, importers, and retailers of cosmetics in Brazil, and most of them have been harmonized so they can apply to the entire Mercosur.

The current legislation restricts the use of certain substances, such as pyrogallol, formaldehyde, or paraformaldehyde, and bans the use of others, such as lead acetate in cosmetic products. All restricted and forbidden substances and products are listed in the regulation RDC 16/11 and RDC 162, 09/11/01.

More recently, a new cosmetic Technical Regulation (RDC 15/2013) was set up to establish a list of authorized and restricted substances for cosmetic use, used in products such as hair dyes, nail hardeners, or used as product preservatives.

Most Brazilian regulations are optimized, harmonized, or adapted in order to be applicable and extended to the entire Mercosur economic zone.

=== International ===
The International Organization for Standardization (ISO) published new guidelines on the safe manufacturing of cosmetic products under a Good Manufacturing Practices (GMP) regime. Regulators in several countries and regions have adopted this standard, ISO 22716:2007, effectively replacing existing guidance and standards. ISO 22716 provides a comprehensive approach for a quality management system for those engaged in the manufacturing, packaging, testing, storage, and transportation of cosmetic end products. The standard deals with all aspects of the supply chain, from the early delivery of raw materials and components until the shipment of the final product to the consumer.

The standard is based on other quality management systems, ensuring smooth integration with such systems as ISO 9001 or the British Retail Consortium (BRC) standard for consumer products. Therefore, it combines the benefits of GMP, linking cosmetic product safety with overall business improvement tools that enable organisations to meet global consumer demand for cosmetic product safety certification.

In July 2012, since microbial contamination is one of the greatest concerns regarding the quality of cosmetic products, the ISO introduced a new standard for evaluating the antimicrobial protection of a cosmetic product by preservation efficacy testing and microbiological risk assessment.

== See also ==
- Acne cosmetica
- Airbrush makeup
- Makeup brush
- Baking
- Body art
- Contouring
- Cosmeceutical
- Cosmetic packaging
- Cosmetic surgery
- Cosmetics policy
- Electrotherapy (cosmetic)
- Female cosmetic coalitions
- Henna
- Ingredients of cosmetics
- International Federation of Societies of Cosmetic Chemists
- Male cosmetics
- Moulage
- Natural skin care
- Palm oil
- Permanent makeup
- Skin care
