= Toner (skin care) =

Type of cosmetics

In cosmetics, a skin toner or simply a toner refers to a water-based lotion, tonic, or wash designed to cleanse the skin and prepare it for other skincare products, such as moisturizers and serums. Typically used on the face, toners remove any remaining impurities after cleansing, balance the skin’s pH, and hydrate the skin. They also serve to protect and refresh the skin, often containing ingredients that can soothe, moisturize, exfoliate, or target specific skin concerns like oil control or pore minimization. Toners are typically categorized by their function and intensity into types such as skin bracers, tonics, acid toners, and astringents.

== History and development ==
The use of toners in skincare emerged in the early 20th century as a response to the limitations of harsh, alkaline, soap-based facial cleansers. These early cleansers, while effective in removing dirt and oil, were often harsh on the skin. They could disrupt the skin's natural pH balance, leaving behind a scum or residue that made the skin feel dry and irritated. Toners were developed as a solution aimed at restoring the skin's natural acidity. Initially, they were primarily formulated with astringent ingredients, such as alcohol and witch hazel.

In the late 1960s, toners became more popular as the 'cleanse, tone, moisturize' routine emerged as the first skincare regimen to undergo clinical testing. Over time, it became clear that alcohol-based astringents, while effective in treating oily skin, were too harsh for many skin types and caused excess drying and irritation. As a result, skincare brands began formulating gentler toners focused on soothing and hydrating the skin. Ingredients like herbal extracts, floral waters, and aloe vera were introduced, allowing toners to balance the skin without stripping it of moisture.

Today, toners are diverse and cater to a wide range of skincare needs, including hydration, exfoliation, and antioxidant protection. In recent years, the clean beauty movement has influenced the formulation of toners, leading to a focus on organic and natural ingredients that avoid synthetic chemicals known to irritate sensitive skin. Current beauty trends centered around skincare have increased awareness and demand for toner, contributing to an increasing market size and sales volume for skin toner globally.

== Types ==
=== Skin bracers or fresheners ===
These are the mildest form of toners; they contain water and a humectant such as glycerin, and little if any alcohol (0–10%). Humectants help to keep the moisture in the upper layers of the epidermis by preventing it from evaporating. A popular example of this is rosewater.

These toners are the gentlest to the skin, and are most suitable for use on dry, dehydrated, sensitive and normal skins. It may give a burning sensation to sensitive skin.

=== Skin tonics ===
These are slightly stronger and contain a small quantity of alcohol (up to 20%), water and a humectant ingredient. Orange flower water is an example of a skin tonic. Skin tonics are suitable for use on normal, combination, and oily skin.

=== Acid toners ===
These are a strong form of toner that typically contains alpha hydroxy acid and or beta hydroxy acid. Acid toners are formulated with the intent of chemically exfoliating the skin. Glycolic, lactic, and mandelic acids are the most commonly used alpha hydroxy acids, best suited to exfoliate the surface of the skin. Salicylic acid is the most commonly used beta hydroxy acid best for exfoliating into the deeper layers of the skin.

=== Astringents ===
These are the strongest form of toner and contain a high proportion of alcohol (20–60%), antiseptic ingredients, water, and a humectant ingredient. These can be irritating and damaging to the skin as they can remove excess protective lipids as well as denature proteins in the skin when a high percentage of alcohol is used.

== Ingredients, uses, and benefits ==
Common ingredients found in toners include:

- Water – The primary base for most toners, high water content helps to hydrate the skin.
- Astringents – Ingredients like witch hazel and alcohol help tighten pores, remove excess oils, and reduce inflammation.
- Humectants – Hydrating agents like hyaluronic acid and glycerin help skin attract and retain moisture.
- Exfoliants – Alpha hydroxy acids (AHAs) and beta hydroxy acids (BHAs), like glycolic acid or salicylic acid, can help remove dead skin cells, unclog pores, and improve skin texture.
- Antioxidants – Ingredients like vitamin C, niacinamide, green tea extract, vitamin E, and resveratrol protect and repair the skin from free radicals, improve skin tone, brighten, and stimulate collagen production.

Different toners are formulated with a variety of active ingredients tailored to address specific skin concerns, resulting in varying outcomes. Users can select toners based on their individual skincare needs and preferences.
