= Airbrush makeup =

Makeup sprayed onto the skin using an airbrush

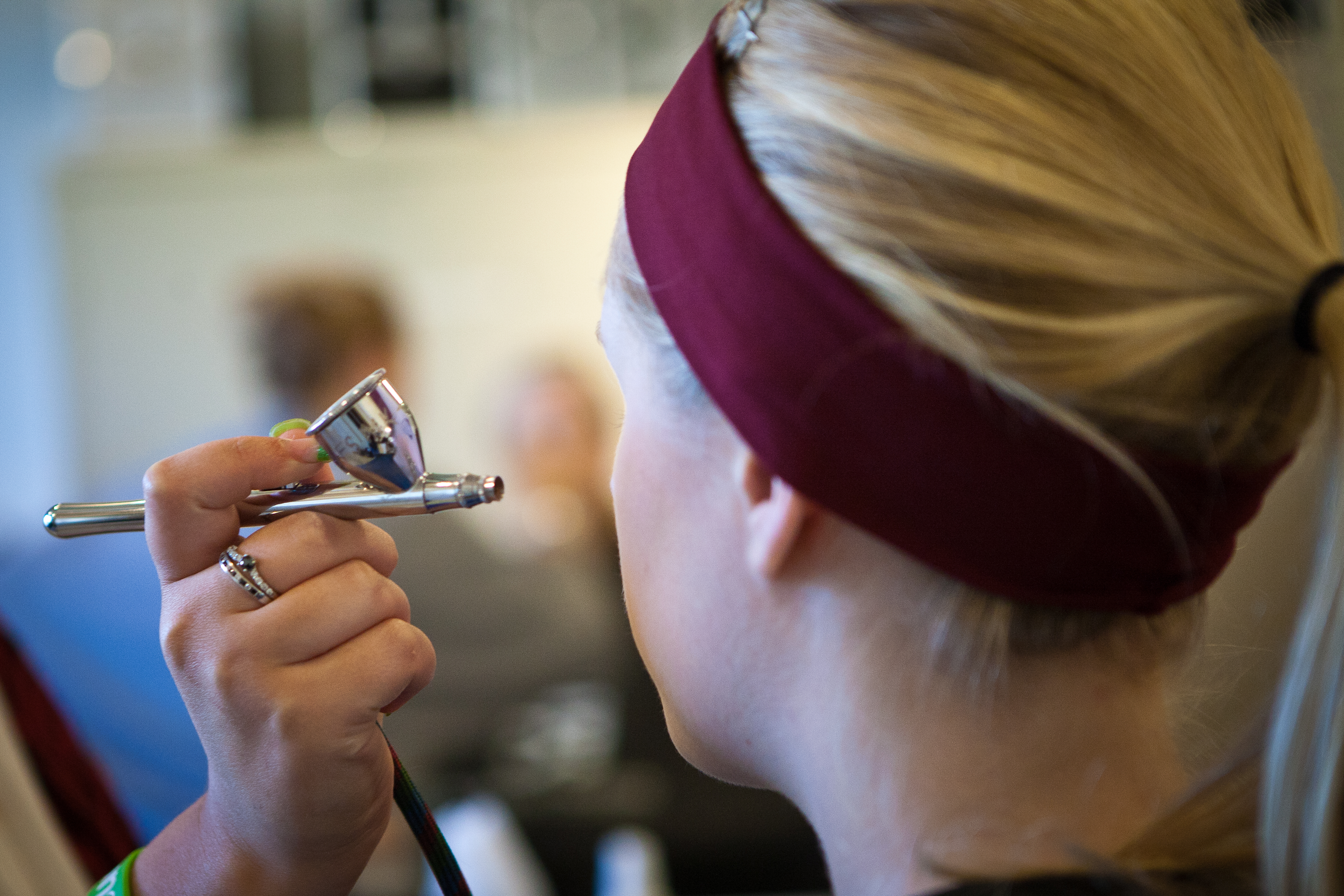
A makeup artist applies foundation to a models face with an airbrush.

Airbrush makeup is makeup sprayed onto the skin using an airbrush machine instead of being applied with sponges, brushes, fingers, or other methods. A typical airbrush system uses a compressor to create airflow through a hose connected to a trigger-controlled spray painting gun. The airbrush pressure can be adjusted to apply various types of makeup, such as lighter, heavier, or more detailed styles. Airbrushes are used in film, theater, bridal makeup, and sunless tanning. Airbrush systems designed for personal, in-home use are usually smaller and work at a lower pressure than systems used in professional applications.

== History ==
Airbrushed makeup was used in Hollywood movies at least as early as the 1930s. Monte Westmore is sometimes credited with developing the technique for Gone With the Wind, but his brother Wally was using it at least five years earlier in Pre-Code films such as Murder at the Vanities.

== Uses ==
Airbrush makeup has become more popular with the advent of high-definition video and television (HD). Traditional powder or liquid based make-up can settle and appear in pores and wrinkles and be visible on HD film. As the makeup is sprayed on, it connects with the skin as millions of droplets of formula. The formula can create an even, sheer, natural appearance to the skin that, if applied properly for a natural look, can appear natural and non-heavy like traditional makeup. Airbrush makeup wears longer than traditional powder or liquid foundation, and is able to stay put upwards of 12–24 hours. It can be used to cover five o'clock shadows for men. Airbrush makeup is also available for eye shadow, blush, eyebrows and lips and can be layered, shaded, highlighted and contoured. Application wise, the technique is more sanitary than traditional makeup application due to the artist never having to touch the skin. It's also faster, if done by a trained artist. Fantasy and special effects are able to be stenciled or created by freehand.

== Benefits ==
Airbrush makeup is characterized by its unique 'globular' application technique. The makeup is dispersed as an extremely fine mist through the airbrush gun. Millions of tiny little dots are created on the skin and when connected and layered together, create somewhat of a net over the entire face. This makes airbrush makeup to be a thin, light layer on the skin that is barely noticeable to the wearer. Certain formulas wear better than others and it is important to choose carefully when deciding what mixture is right for the job. Some airbrush makeups are entirely waterproof unless taken off with a specific remover that breaks down the active ingredient. For instance, silicone-based airbrush fluid is largely waterproof depending on how much, and how you set the makeup. It can be dunked in water (handy for fashion photography or film) or sweat through without removing or dislodging the airbrush base. It does however, take a specific silicone makeup remover to thoroughly take off (but will naturally come off over the course of many hours). In the contemporary makeup scene, airbrush makeup has become a preferred option for bridal and events makeup due to its long wearing and flawless appearance.

== Ingredients ==
Airbrush makeup comes in six different formulas:

- Water based: Finely ground pigments dissipated in water.
- Polymer water based: A mix of water, polymers and pigment, when airbrushed on the skin the polymer dries leaving a continuous coating on the skin.
- Polymer SD40 alcohol based: Instead of using water like the polymer-water-based formula, it uses alcohol which assists with drying of the makeup on the skin.
- Alcohol based: Also called "temporary airbrush inks" alcohol based formulas are generally used when creating fake tattoos.
- Silicone based: Uses silicone for longer lasting wear and without fading. Silicone-based can be thinned with certain types of formula additives, for lighter coverage.

Airbrush makeup can be removed by using a 50/50 mix of isopropyl alcohol and isopropyl myristate.

== Technique ==
Airbrushing for makeup utilizes a freehand technique to apply makeup while manipulating aspects such as distance and air pressure to produce certain effects and coverage. Airbrush makeup artists will either use a circular motion or forward-back motion with the airgun when applying foundation. Both dual-action and single-action airbrushes can be used for airbrushing makeup and require slightly different techniques.

A dual-action airbrush allows the user to control airflow by depressing the trigger with the index finger and drawing it backwards. This draws air from the compressor. The further the trigger is depressed, the more makeup is released. The advantage to using a dual-action airbrush is that one can use the air as a guide before allowing makeup to pass through the nozzle. Air is also used to dry the makeup after application. Makeup is also mixed in the cup by allowing a small amount of air to flow into it, thereby mixing two pigments. This technique is known as 'back-bubbling'.

A single-action airbrush is generally considered easier to use because depressing the trigger releases a fixed ratio of makeup to air. However, in order to achieve different levels of coverage and detail the nozzle has to be changed between applications.

Generally an airbrush makeup artist will work with a PSI range between 0-35 PSI. Many compressors designed for personal use in the home will not achieve airflow greater than 15 PSI. A low PSI is preferable when airbrushing makeup around the face and eyes while full body application (such as covering blemishes or tanning) is easier and faster with a higher PSI.

Airbrush makeup is applied by layering several passes of makeup. This allows the artists to build upon previous layers to produce subtle changes. When applying foundation between 6-12 drops of makeup are used. The makeup is sprayed onto the face at a distance of 6-12 inches.

Stencils are commonly used to assist the application of difficult areas such as eye-liner. Stencils are also available for body-art and temporary tattoos.
