= List of tattoo artists =

This is a list of notable tattoo artists.

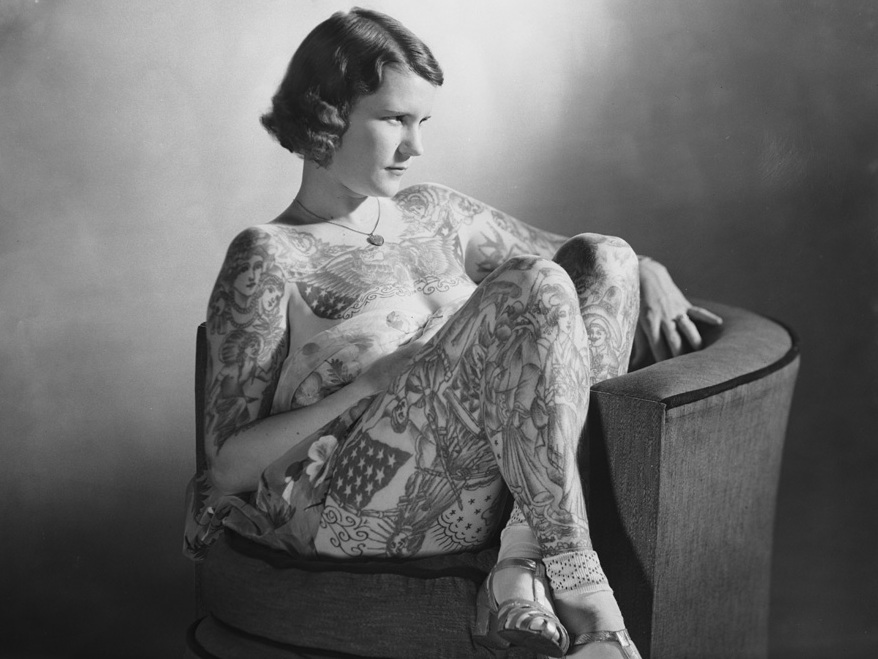
Betty Broadbent, 1938

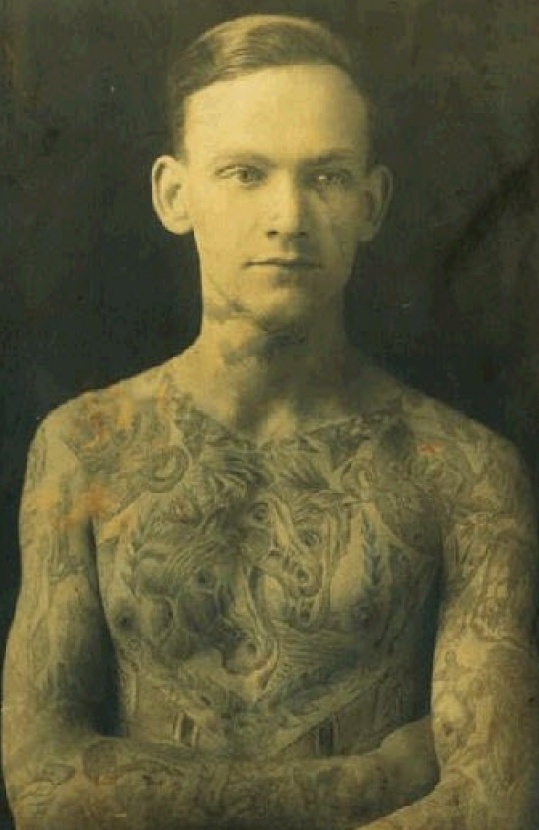
Amund Dietzel, 1914

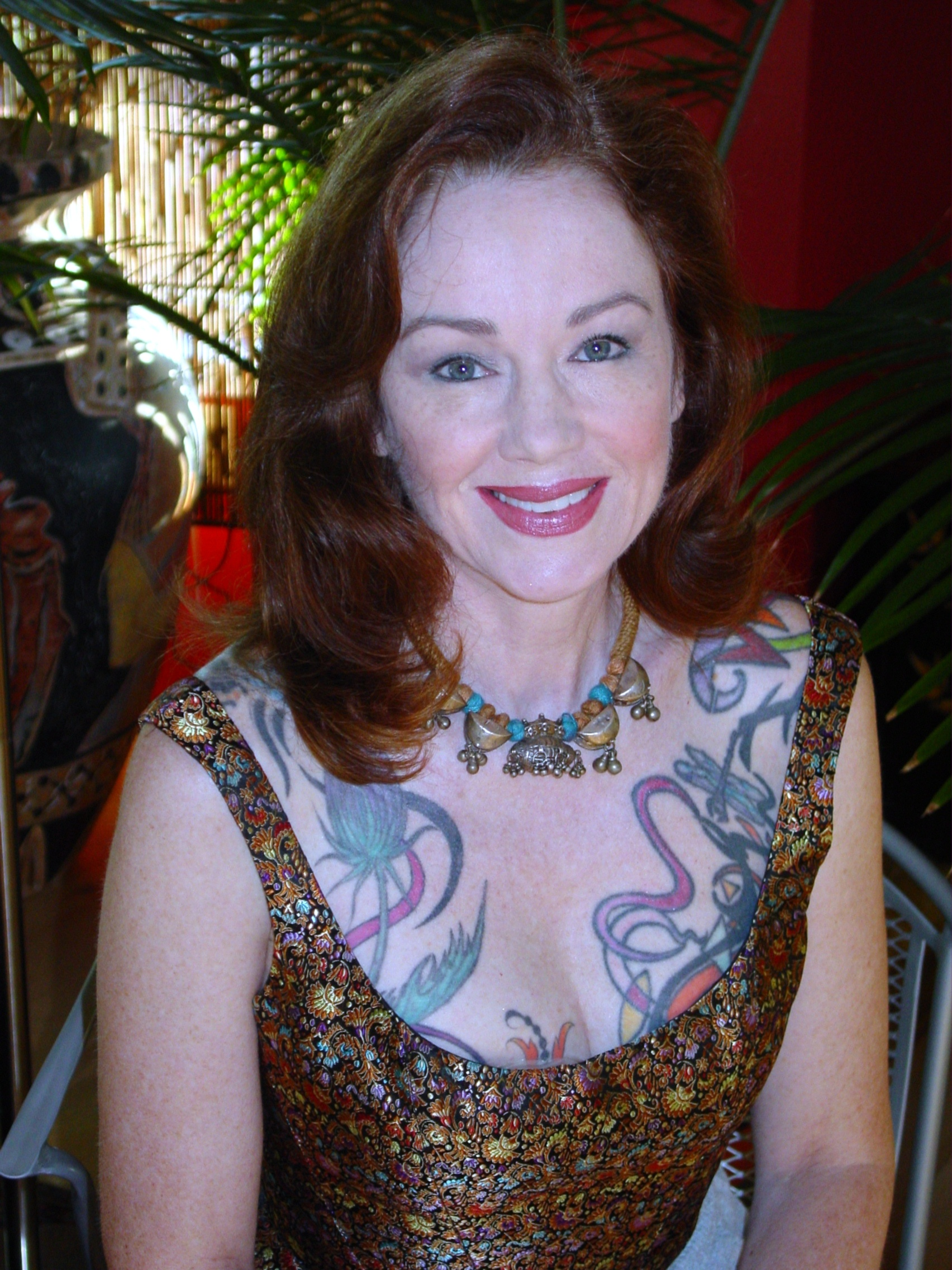
Mary Jane Haake, 2011

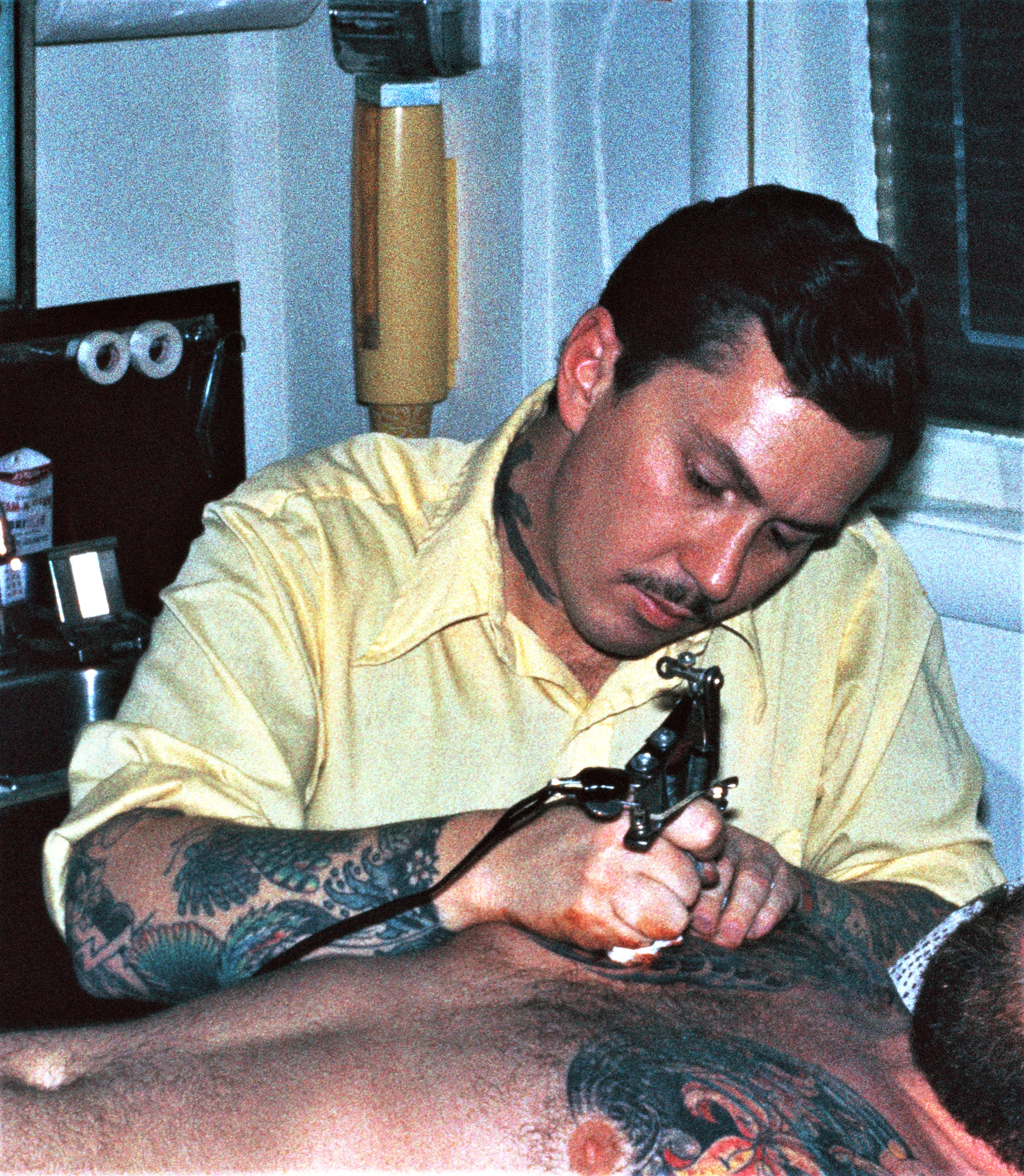
Don Ed Hardy, 1980

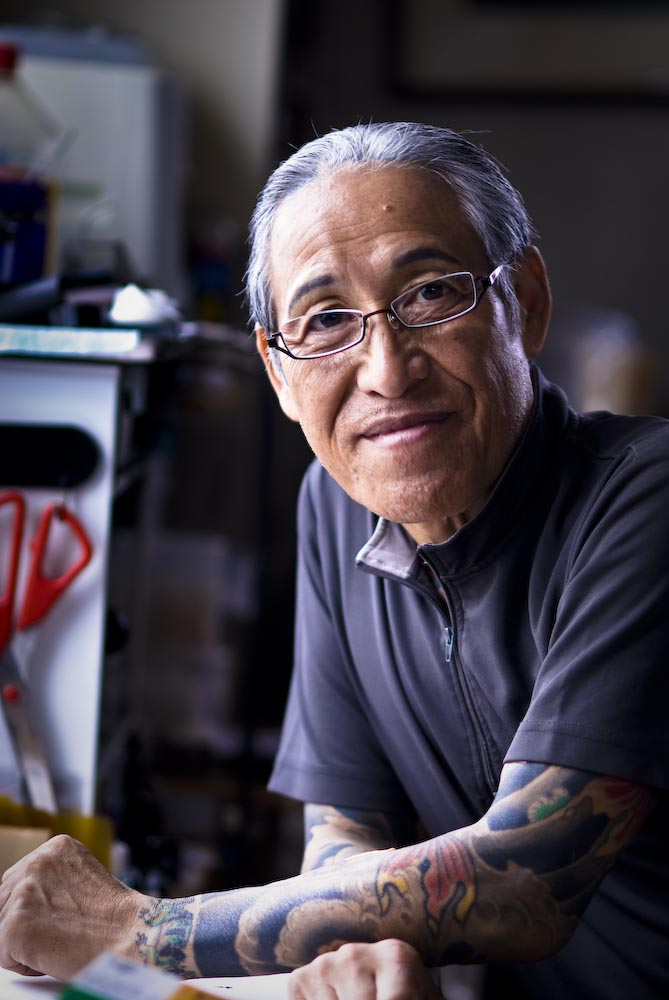
Horiyoshi III, 2010

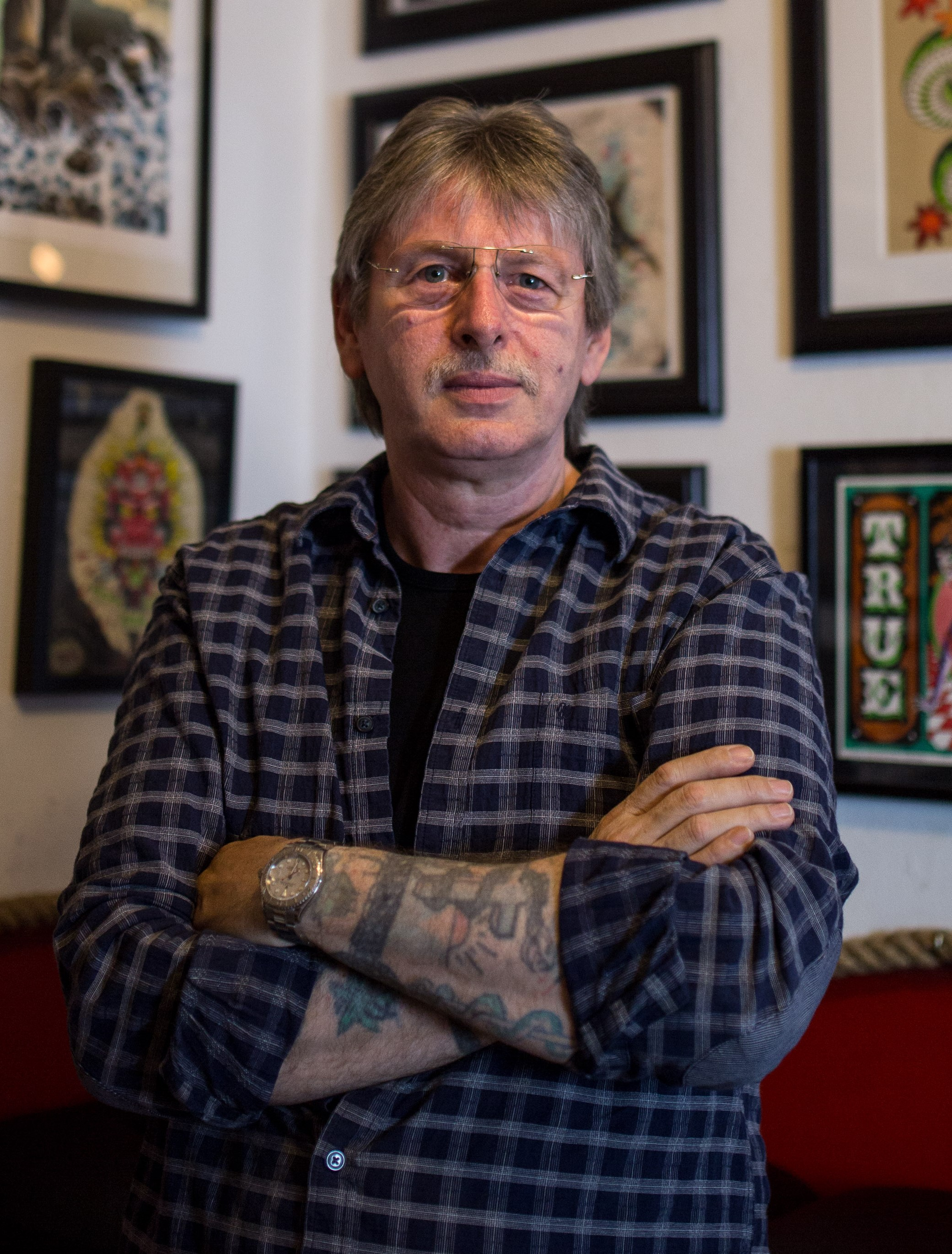
Manfred Kohrs, 2016

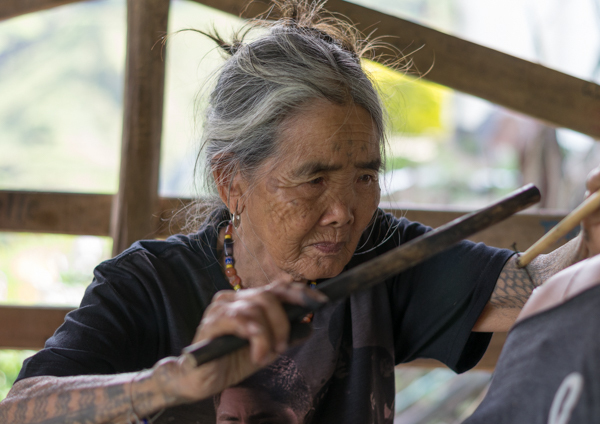
Whang-od, 2016

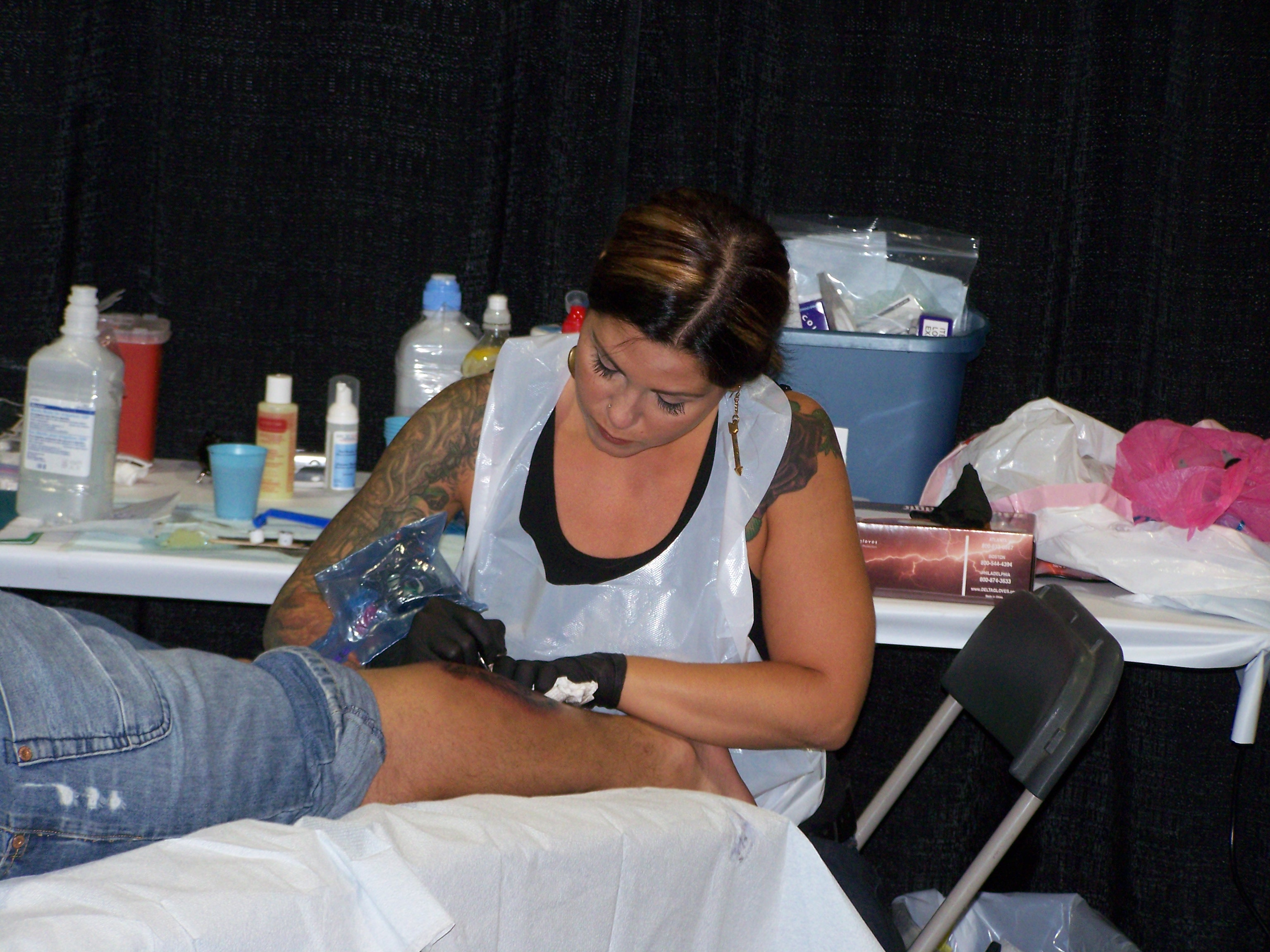
Kim Saigh, 2007

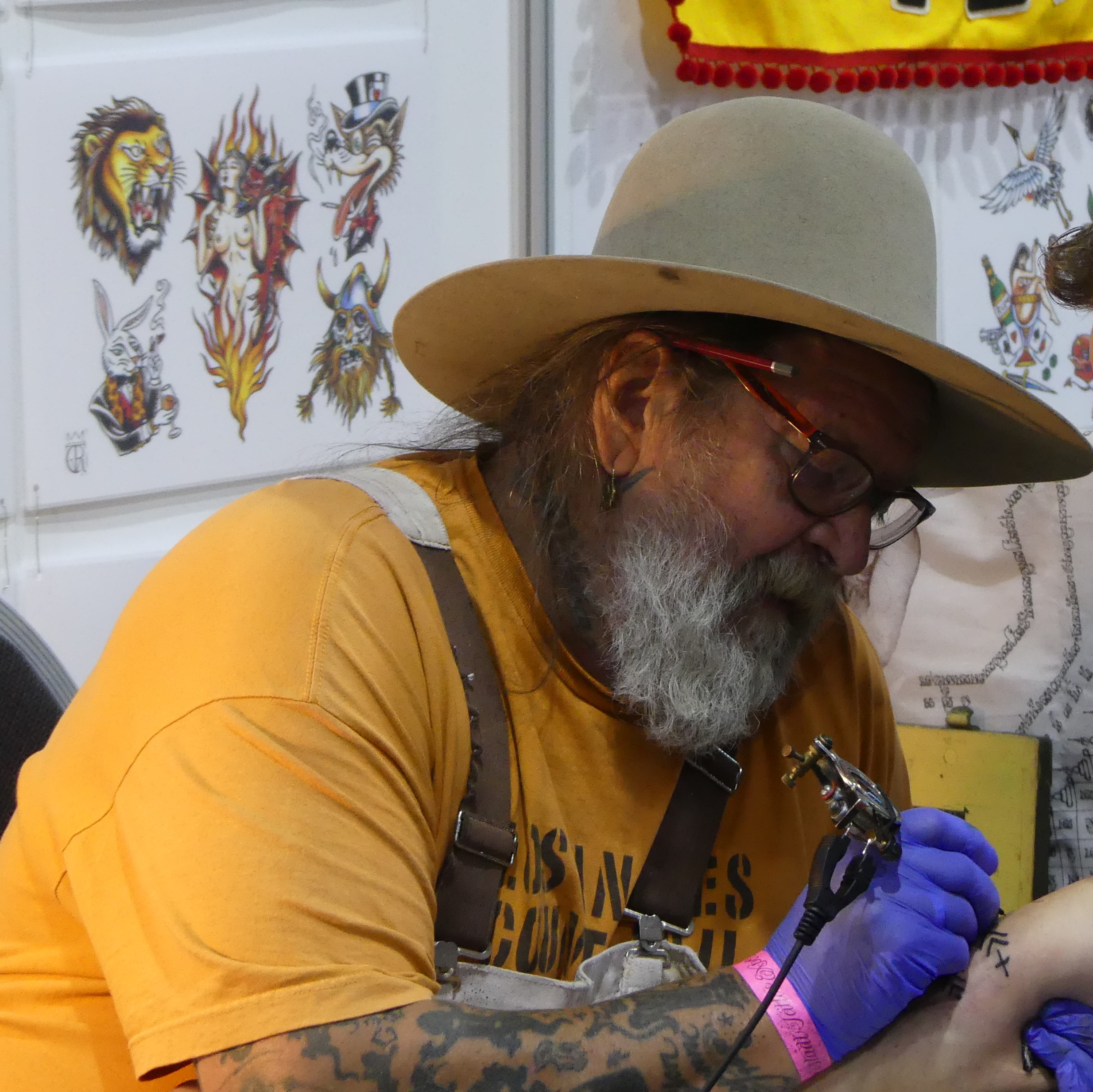
Henk Schiffmacher, 2018

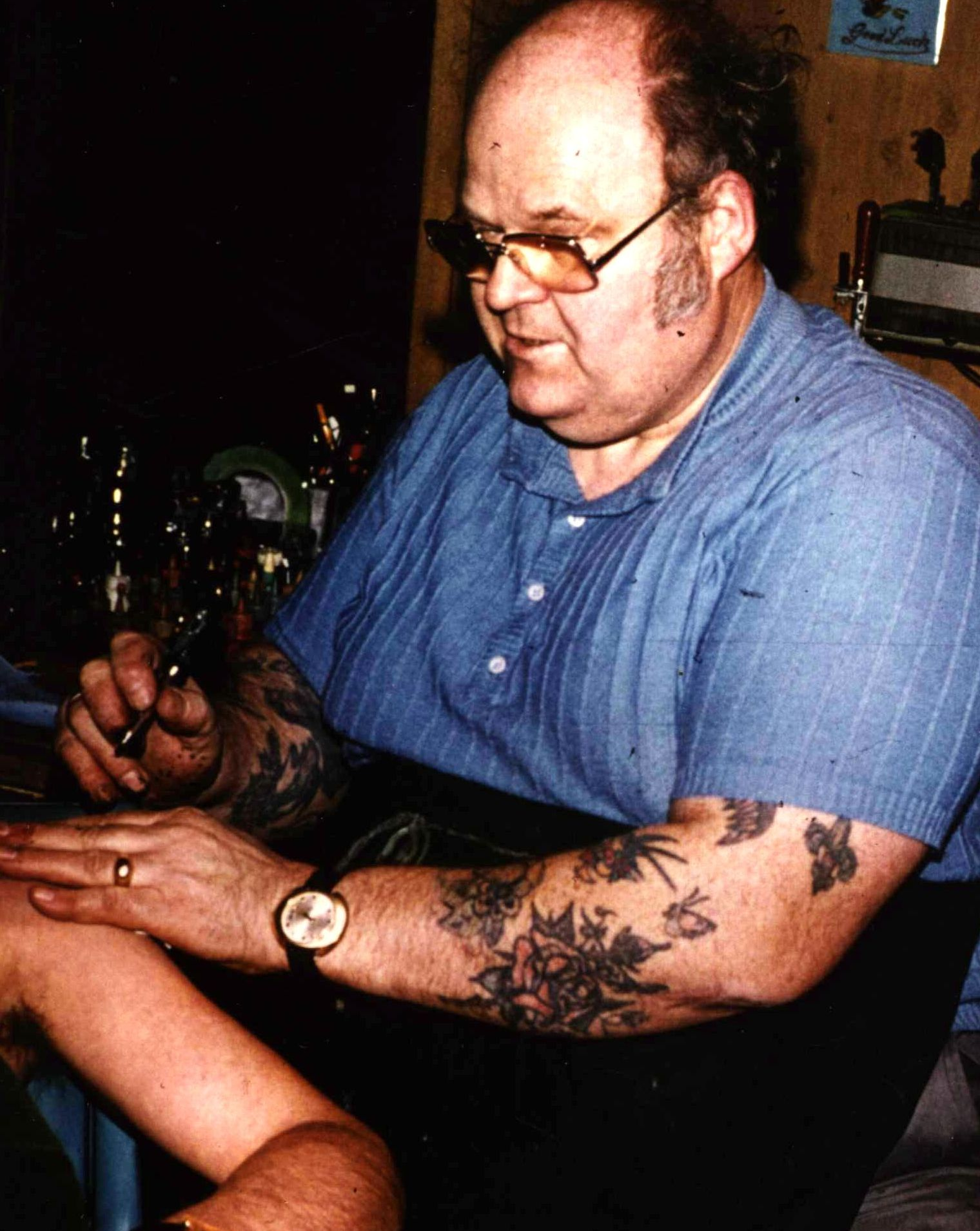
Horst Streckenbach, 1979

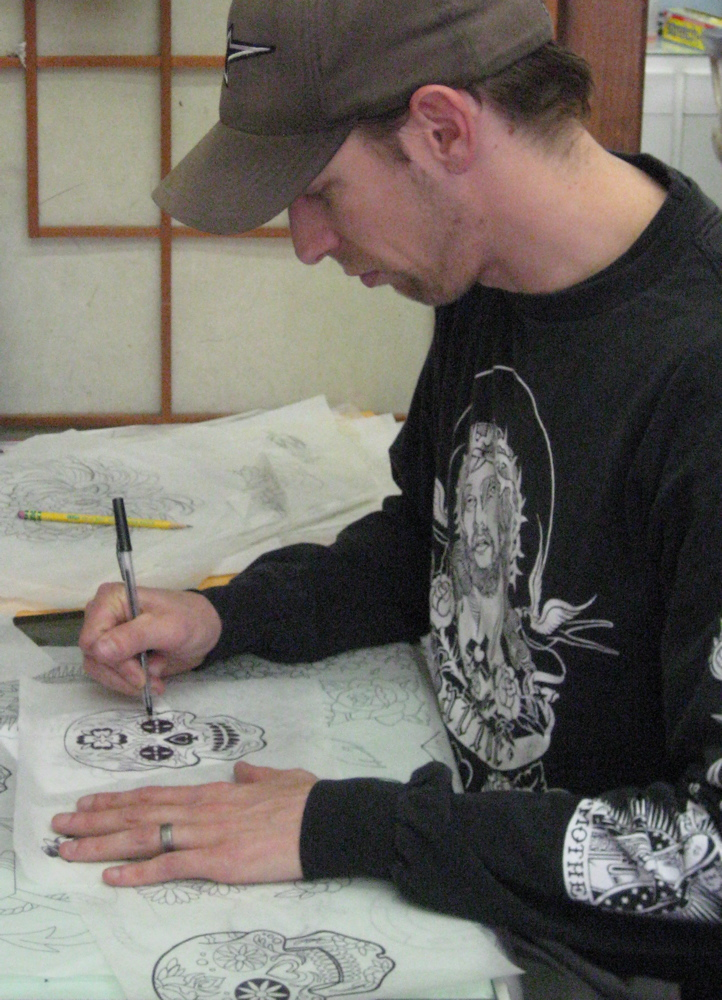
Paul Timman, 2009

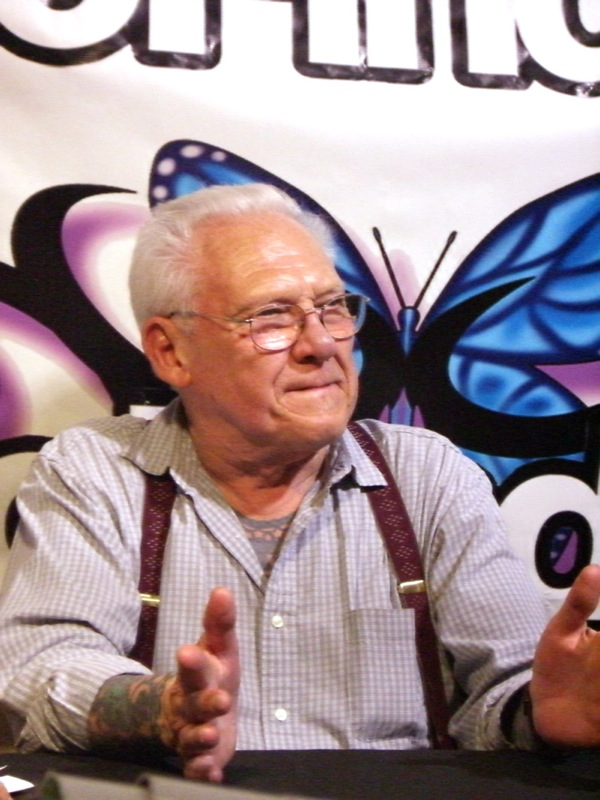
Lyle Tuttle, 2007

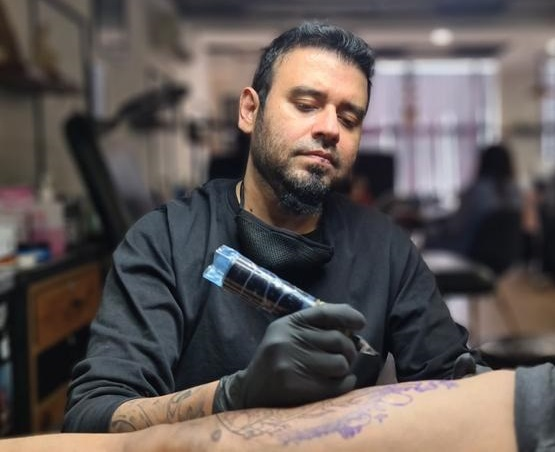
Lokesh Verma, 2021

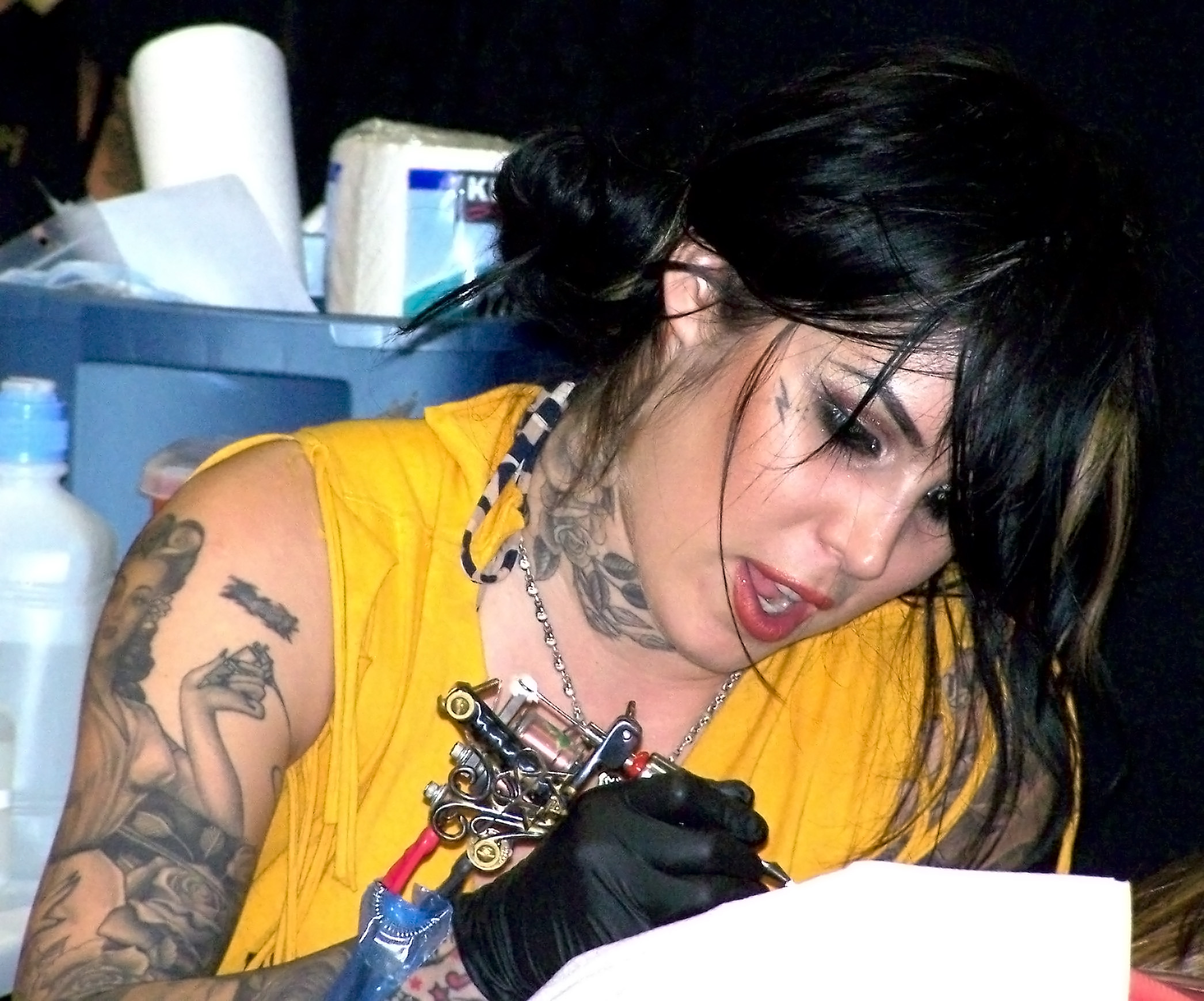
Kat Von D, 2007

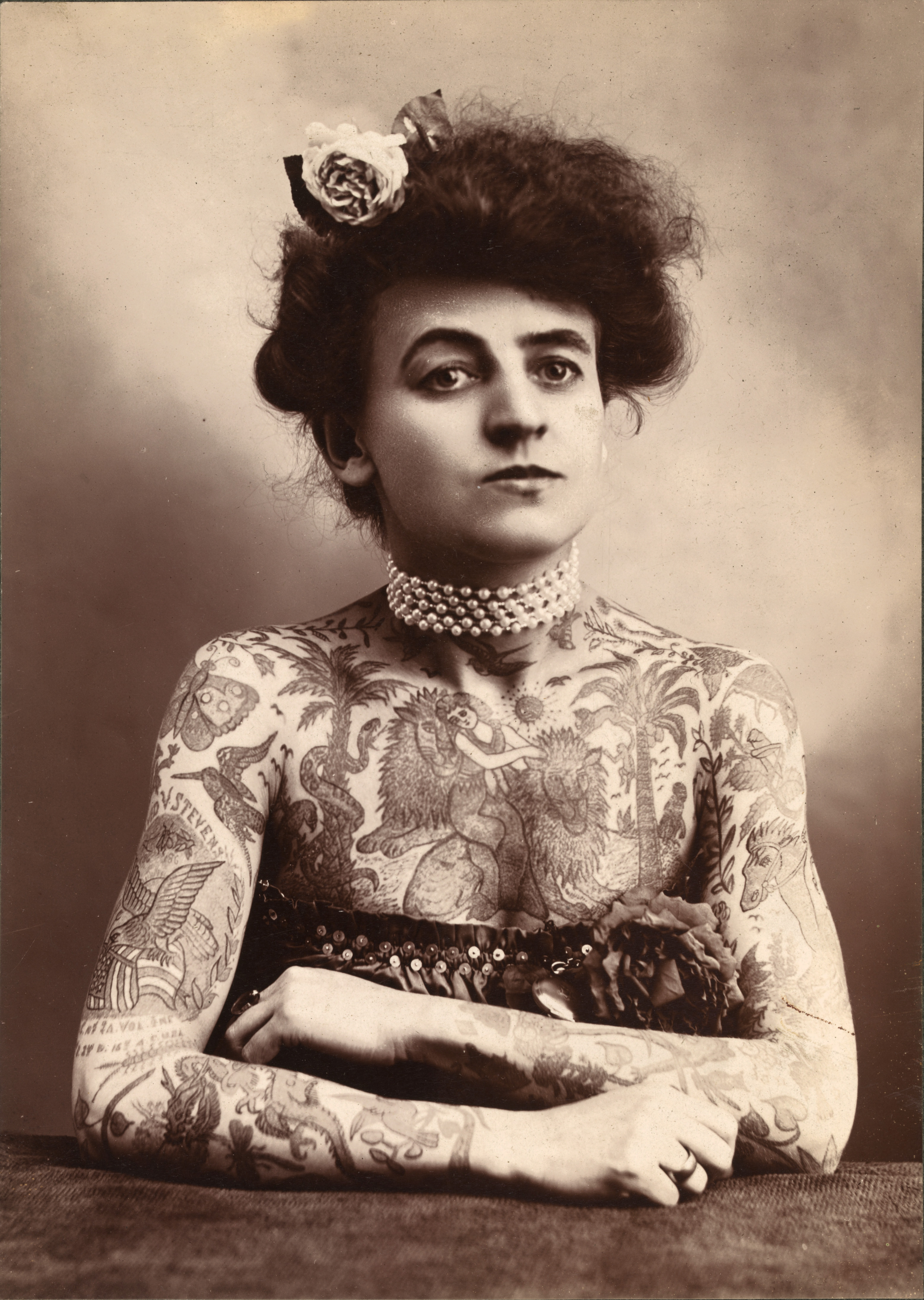
Maud Wagner, c. 1907

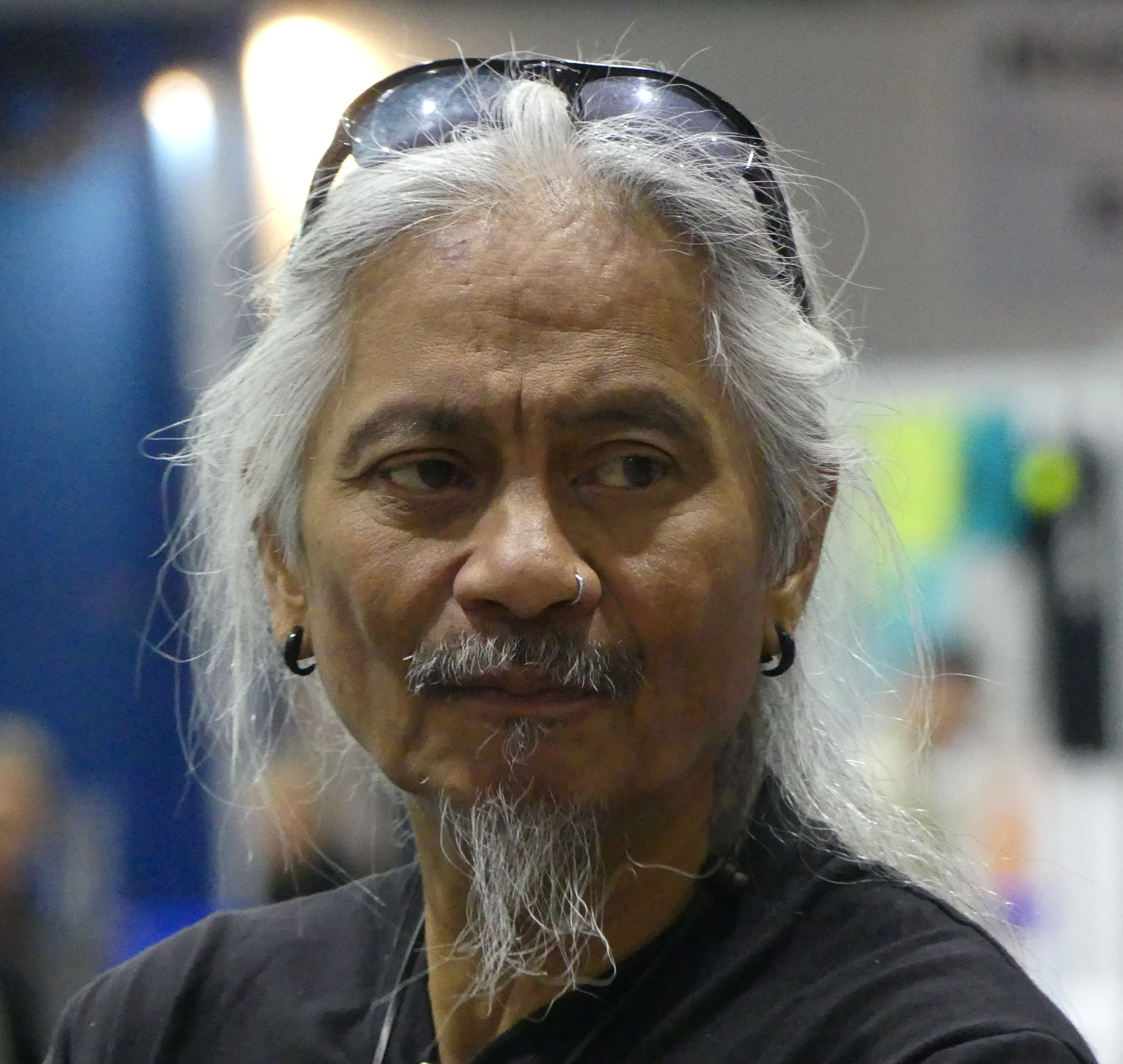
Leo Zulueta, 2019

Name	Date	Nationality	Note
Hannah Aitchison	Born 1966	American	Chicago, Illinois based artist featured on TLC's LA Ink.
Bang Bang	Born 1985	American	Real name is Keith Scott McCurdy.
Kari Barba	Born 1960	American	Current owner of tattoo shop in Long Beach, California, that has continuously operated since 1927
Alex Binnie	Born 1959	American	
Paul Booth	Born 1967	American	
Darren Brass	Born 1972	American	
Betty Broadbent	1909–1983	American	Tattoo artist and most photographed tattooed lady of the 20th century
Myra Brodsky	Born 1987	German	New York based tattoo artist
George Burchett	1872–1953	British	Known as "King of Tattooists". Tattooed royalty and The Great Omi.
Scott Campbell	Born 1977	American	New York-based tattoo artist
Mister Cartoon	Born 1970	Mexican American	a.k.a. Mark Machado
Vincent Castiglia	Born 1982	American	Artist at Vincent Castiglia Gallery & Custom Tattoo
María José Cristerna	Born 1976	Mexican	Known as "The Vampire Woman" and "The Jaguar Woman". Recognized by Guinness World Records as the most tattooed woman in the world, with 96% of her body covered.
August Coleman	1884–1973	American	In 1918, he opened a tattoo parlor in Norfolk, Virginia, near the navy base there.
Ben Corday	1875–1938	American	Prolific tattoo flash artist
Cudjuy Patjidres		Taiwanese (Paiwan)	Indigenous Taiwanese tattoo artist
Alan Dean	Born 1964	British	Owner of Tattoo UK, UK based tattoo studio chain.
Amund Dietzel	1891–1974	Norwegian American	Early American tattoo artist, "Master of Milwaukee"
Manu Farrarons	Born 1967	French	Polynesian tattoo artist based in Tahiti, French Polynesia.
Chris Garver	Born 1970	American	Formerly based in New York City, now based in Florida. Featured on TLC's Miami Ink.
Shotsie Gorman	1951-2025	American	New Jersey-born artist known for his photorealism and large scale portraits.
Julia Mage’au Gray	Born 1973	Papua New Guinean	Credited with revitalising women's traditional tattooing, such as veiqia from Fiji, in countries in Oceania.
Jacci Gresham	Born 1951	American	Her shop, Aart Accent Tattoos & Body Piercing, is Louisiana's oldest continuous tattoo business.
Mary Jane Haake	Born 1951	American	Known for her work in medical tattooing and permanent makeup.
Yoji Harada	1972–2019	Japanese	Florida based tattoo artist, featured on TLC's Miami Ink.
Don Ed Hardy	Born 1945	American	Known as "the godfather of modern tattoo." Hardy trained under Sailor Jerry and Japanese masters, Hardy is a noted proponent of the use of Japanese tattoo designs and techniques in American work. He founded Tattootime.
Christine Harvey		New Zealand	One of New Zealand's only female tā moko artists.
Henry Hate	Born 1968	American	a.k.a. Henry Martinez Jr.
Shanghai Kate Hellenbrand	1942–2022	American	Called "America's Tattoo Godmother"
Dan Henk	Born 1972	American	
Adal Hernandez	Born 1973	American	Based in New York City
Martin Hildebrandt	1825–1890	German-American	Early tattoo artist in New York City
Herbert Hoffmann	1919–2010	German	
Horihide	1929–2017	Japanese	
Horiyasu	Born 1953	Japanese	One of the most respected contemporary tattooists in Japan
Horiyoshi III	Born 1946	Japanese	
Nikko Hurtado	Born 1981	American	Has been a guest artist on LA Ink several times. Judge on Paramount's Ink Master (2022).
Greg Irons	1947–1984	American	
Ami James	Born 1972	Israeli	Co-star of Miami Ink. Main judge on Ink Master Season 14
Katzen		American	
Jessie Knight	1904–1992	British	First prominent female tattoo artist in the UK
Manfred Kohrs	Born 1957	German	Student of Horst Streckenbach, conceptual artist
Greg Kulz	Born 1963	American	
Dr Lakra	Born 1972	Mexican	a.k.a. Jeronimo Lopez Ramirez
Vyvyn Lazonga	Born 1947	American	a.k.a. Beverly Bean. Based in Seattle, Washington.
Nikole Lowe	Born 1973	New Zealand	Based in London.
Miryam Lumpini	Born 1993	Swedish	
Sutherland Macdonald	1860–1942	British	The first tattooist in Britain with an identifiable premises open to the public.
Chaim Machlev	Born 1980	German	-
Mark Mahoney	Born 1957	American	
Ryan Ashley Malarkey	Born 1987	American	Tattoo artist based in Grand Junction, CO, featured on Ink Master & Ink Master: Angels.
Corey Miller	Born 1967	American	
Louis Molloy	Born 1963	British	
Grace Neutral	Born 1989	British	Born Grace Walker
Chris Núñez	Born 1973	American	Featured on TLC's Miami Ink.
Samuel O'Reilly	1852–1908	American	Patented the first electric tattoo machine
Whang-od	Born 1917	Filipino	The oldest Filipino tattooist and Kalinga's last mambabatok.
Opie Ortiz	Born 1971	American	
Joey Pang	Born 1979	Chinese	Known for her Chinese Art and Calligraphy pieces
Sua Sulu'ape Paulo II	1949/1950–1999	Samoan	Samoan master tattooist
Eric Pele	Born 1969	American	
Thomas Pendelton	Born 1971	American	
Cally-Jo	Born 1989	British	
Jacki Randall	Born 1959	American	Known for original and freehand, tattooing as well as painting, illustration and cartooning. Currently owner/operator of Charm City Tattoo, Baltimore, Maryland.
Cliff Raven	1932–2001	American	
Tom Riley	1870–?	British	Tattoo artist in the 19th century
Franklin Paul Rogers	1905–1990	American	Designed tattoo machines
Jack Rudy	1954-2025	American	Known for his "black and gray" work. Owns/tattoos at Goodtime Charlie’s Tattooland in Anaheim, California.
Kim Saigh	Born 1973	American	One of the artists on the first season of LA Ink.
Sailor Jerry	1911–1973	American	a.k.a. Norman Keith Collins.
Henk Schiffmacher	Born 1952	Dutch	a.k.a. Hanky Panky. The Amsterdam Tattoo Museum showcases his tattoo collection, the largest in the world.
Jonathan Shaw	Born 1953	American	Founded a tattoo shop in New York City in 1976
Daniel Silva	Born 1993	American	Based in San Francisco, California.
Janet 'Rusty' Skuse	1943–2007	British	
Samuel Steward	1909–1993	American	a.k.a. Phil Andros and Phil Sparrow; tattoo artist and writer from Ohio, later based in California.
Horst Streckenbach	1929–2001	German	a.k.a. "Tattoo Samy"
Paul Timman	Born 1972	American	Notable for his work on celebrities including Angelina Jolie and Drew Barrymore and his line of porcelain dinnerware with Ink Dish.
Bob Tyrrell	Born 1962	American	Known for his "black and gray" portraits
Lyle Tuttle	1931–2019	American	California based artist who tattooed Cher, Jane Fonda and Janis Joplin.
Lokesh Verma		Indian	India based artist who tattooed Guinness Reshi's successful Guinness World Record attempt for most number of flags to be tattooed on human body.
Kat Von D	Born 1982	Mexican	Featured on TLC series Miami Ink and LA Ink.
Maud Wagner	1877–1961	American	The first known female tattoo artist in the U.S.
Christian Warlich	1891–1964	German	Hamburg based tattooist who professionalised tattooing in Germany. He supposedly was the first one to use an electric tattoo machine in Germany
Leo Zulueta	Born 1952	Filipino American	Known as "the father of modern tribal tattooing." Zulueta championed all-black tattooing, called "the king of black." Featured on TLC's Tattoo Wars.
