= Mary Jane Haake =

American tattoo artist

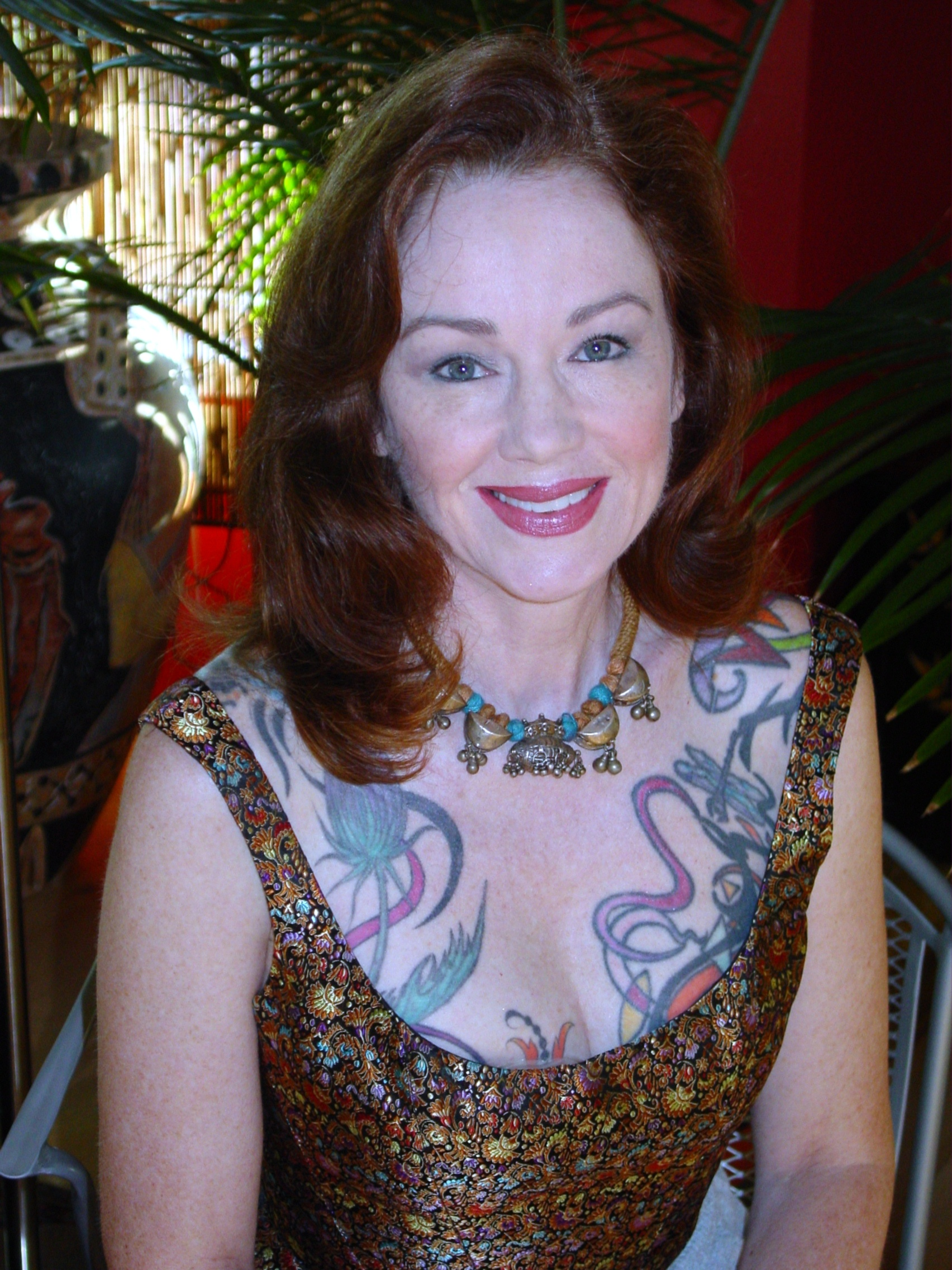
Mary Jane Haake at a Skin & Ink Party

Mary Jane Haake (/ˈhɑːki/ HAH-kee; born 1951) is an American tattoo artist and authority on medical tattooing and permanent makeup (cosmetic tattooing). She was instrumental in bringing topical anesthetics to the tattooing and body modification industries.

== Early life ==
Haake grew up Catholic in Salt Lake City, Utah. She remembers being fascinated at age 5 by a man with a train tattoo that ran from arm to arm across his chest. Haake moved to Portland, Oregon in 1975 and was employed as a legal secretary. During a lunchtime walk two years later, she discovered a tattoo parlor run by 78-year-old Bert Grimm. She returned that evening for her first tattoo.

== From apprentice to art degree ==
Haake began spending her lunches with Grimm and his wife, Julia, listening to the stories of his legendary career. It was not long before she was working in the tattoo shop. During this four-year apprenticeship, she entered the Pacific Northwest College of Art, majoring in painting and sculpture. She persuaded the college to accept tattooing as her thesis during her senior year:

In all societies, the man or woman who is not decorated in some way – changed from their natural state – is, in a sense, decoratively inarticulate ... body decoration is a type of language or code, which is spoken through hairstyles, mutilations (pierced ears), tattooing or painting (makeup). In the West, because of our obsession with clothing for almost all parts of the body ... we have restricted the amount of skin available to be used as a cosmetic language. Most of us have forgotten that perhaps the first works of art dedicated to the combination of form and color were carried out on the skin.

Her proposal of "emphasis being on movement, light, line and color as it relates to each individual 'canvas' ... taking into account the individual's form, texture of skin and attitude" resulted in a presentation of two men and two women (one was Joan Starr) with an average of 30 hours each of her tattoo work. Her volunteer models were scared, but they stood up in front of the committee while the discussion of negative spaces, kinetic movement and sculptural aspects went on around them. Haake earned her Bachelor of Fine Arts on May 15, 1982, becoming the first person to get a degree in tattooing from the Portland Art Museum School or any other university.

== Early career ==
Haake's anatomy classes and 2-year study of sculpture in Florence, Italy helped her build a positive reputation for custom work. She opened Dermigraphics in 1981-seeing customers by appointment only, a much different business model than the three street level tattoo shops in Portland at the time. Executives and housewives alike appreciated the discreet Fine Arts Building location and although they initially came to her for a serious piece of art, news soon spread of her other talents.

== Medical tattooing ==
During her apprenticeship with Grimm, Haake watched as he camouflaged scars and recreated hair with fine lines—techniques he learned while working on World War I soldiers who had been gassed and burned. She translated those lessons into redrawing lips lost to cancer, recoloring skin grafts to match the surrounding areas, and disguising surgery scars. She soon started receiving referrals from physicians, beauticians and electrologists and found herself holding seminars for plastic surgeons and dermatologists. Haake showed them how tattooing can restore eyebrows lost to Alopecia areata, repigment areas affected by vitiligo, or recreate nipples on mastectomy patients. She soon attracted a following in the medical community.

== Permanent makeup ==
Haake realized that her medical tattooing skills could also enhance women's appearance. Eyeliner, eyebrows and lips became a large part of her practice. First appointments involved a consultation, with another scheduled at least a few weeks later for the actual procedure. She wanted her clients to realize that this was a serious commitment.

In late 1990, Haake and GJ Normand visited Pati Pavlik in Laguna Beach, California to help organize the first National Cosmetic Tattoo Association convention. Haake contributed to a successful first gathering of permanent makeup technicians. The Society of Cosmetic Professionals, which became the Society of Permanent Cosmetic Professionals, had Haake on their board from 1992 to 1996. She continued to serve the organization as Technical Advisor and Co-Editor of their quarterly newsletter until 2002. In 2004, she assisted in the development of a National Certification Examination.

== Topical anesthetics ==
A 1984 article titled "Ouch Art" described Haake's approach when applying eyeliner as "The amount of pain you suffer depends on your attitude." In 1989 she warned that the eyebrows she was about to apply were not going to be fun, and counted with her client "One, two, three ... remember to breathe... one, two...'". She knew that to make permanent makeup procedures appealing to more women, something would have to change.

By 1990, she was testing a topical anesthetic she developed with the help of a Canadian chemist. A 2001 article in Day Spa Magazine records her recommendation for using epinephrine to reduce swelling and bleeding, particularly in lip procedures. She continued to experiment and test, working with compounding pharmacists and FDA manufacturing facilities.

From 1997 to 2003, Haake was Vice President of Face & Body Professionals. She formed Dermal Source in 2004 to continue to expand the selection of topical anesthetics for the beauty, tattoo and permanent cosmetic fields.

In her book "Through My Eyes", Pati Pavlik states "Over the years MJ did much, if not all, of the real documented research and development of topical anesthetics and painkillers. From those early experiences came the highly developed products that we use today, products which have become as important to the cosmetic procedure as the needle itself."

== Educator and consultant ==
Haake began educating with seminars at the first NCTA convention in 1991 on lips and cheek blush. When Alfredo Gonzalez, a Latin micropigmentation instructor, decided to organize international training, Haake was usually among the teams he assembled to travel to different countries. She has been approved as a State of Oregon Continuing Education Instructor since 1998 for advanced instruction on tattooing and permanent makeup, and continues to offer seminars and classes in cosmetic and decorative tattooing both in the USA and abroad.

Whether it is helping an actor in a TV show, advising Multnomah County's Health and Sanitation Department or helping the insurance industry define a list of insurable work, Ms. Haake is comfortable bringing her industry's voice to the table. Her dedication brought her to the attention of Governor Barbara Roberts, who appointed Haake to Oregon's Advisory Council for Electrology, Permanent Color Technicians and Tattoo Artists from 1991 to 1996. In 2009, when the Portland Art Museum (PAM) decided to showcase the art of tattoo, Mary Jane Haake was approached for help. "We've come full circle" she thought.

== Historian and author ==
PAM's three-month exhibit "Marking Portland: The Art of Tattoo" included a one-day expo and floor show. Haake organized a historic exhibit for Skinvisible that included powdered pigment and the Listerine they mixed it with, old handmade tattoo machines, Bert Grimm flash, historic photos, and Elizabeth Weinzirl, "The World's Greatest Tattoo Fan", images and memorabilia. On August 2, 2009, Haake also moderated a panel on the History of Tattoos in Portland which included Don Deaton, Jeff Johnson and Cherie Hiser. Haake has written a number of articles about Grimm and Weinzirl, whose body was covered with his work exclusively.

== Tattoo community involvement ==
In 1998, Turner Original Production decided to do a feature on pioneers of the modern tattoo era titled "Tattoos: Women of the Ink". They turned to four extraordinary female artists whose work thrived in a male-dominated trade: Pat Fish, Vyvyn Lazonga, Mary Jane Haake and Debi Kienel. Haake continues to be involved with the National Tattoo Association and in 2009 was asked to join Don Ed Hardy, Bill DeMichele, Friday Jones, Peggy Sucher, and Susanne Tuttle in roasting Lyle Tuttle. Haake has worked on better cross-contamination products such as UV light sterilization and bringing green products to the studio.
