= Myra Brodsky =

German tattoo artist and illustrator

- Born: 1987
- Occupation: Tattoo artist
- Years active: 2008 - present
- Employer(s): The Decay Parlour (2012 - 2014), Black Mirror Parlour (2014 - 2017)
- Website: https://www.myra-brodsky.com/

Myra Brodsky (born 1987) is a German tattoo artist and illustrator who specializes in stylized colored portraits influenced by the Victorian era, Rococo and Art Nouveau. She is associated with the neo-traditional tattoo movement, which combines traditional tattoo motifs with contemporary themes and techniques.

== History ==
Brodsky began tattooing in 2008 at the age of 19, initially practicing on herself, friends, and family while studying visual communication.

In 2012, she opened her own tattoo studio, The Decay Parlour, in Berlin’s Prenzlauer Berg district in Berlin. The studio closed in 2014, after which she joined Black Mirror Parlour in Kreuzberg, where she worked until 2017.

In 2015, she held her first solo art exhibition at LARRY Gallery in Berlin.

Her work has been featured in VICE Germany, Deutsche Welle, Der Tagesspiegel and tattoo magazines such as Inkedmag, Total Tattoo and TätowierMagazin.

Brodsky is part of the new traditional tattoo movement which brings together traditional imagery mixed with modern ideas.

In 2021, she was interviewed by Forbes, explaining that her inspiration comes from old books, Film Noir, and Orson Welles.

== Personal life ==
She stated in 2022 that she was based in Munich.

== See also ==
- List of Tattoo Artists
