= Wallis Cho =

Wallis Cho 曹震豪
- Genre: Cantopop
- Occupations: Singer-songwriter, music producer
- Years active: 2011–present
- Label: Independent

Wallis Cho (Chinese: 曹震豪; born 1982 or 1983) is a Hong Kong singer-songwriter and independent music producer. He officially joined the Hong Kong music scene in 2011 with the release of his first solo album.

== Biography ==
Cho was born in 1982 or 1983. In 2005, he participated in the Neway Star Wars and won the runner-up, he joined Neway Star and entered the music scene. In the following years, he was active in behind-the-scenes production and various large and small performances.

In 2009, Cho terminated his contract with Neway Star and temporarily switched to work as a sound engineer and salesperson due to the "Cold River Agreement". To support his artist career, Cho took on six jobs including singing at bars, working in the kitchen, and selling attire.

In 2011, Cho officially entered the music industry as an independent music producer under &joy Productions, and debuted as a singer with the album "A Day In Metropolis".

In 2017, the Cosmopolitan magazine compared his songs to "sugar-coated lemon drops that are sweet yet tart". The publication said that "on the surface, they appear to be accessible, mainstream love songs, yet beneath that exterior, they articulate the daily reality of a bewildered generation: growing up too slowly while aging too fast, caught in the grind of work and the exhaustion of survival, and navigating the fragility of love".

Cho is married to Mini, a tattoo artist and YouTuber.
