= Adal Ray =

American tattooist and visionary artist (born 1973)

Adal Hernandez
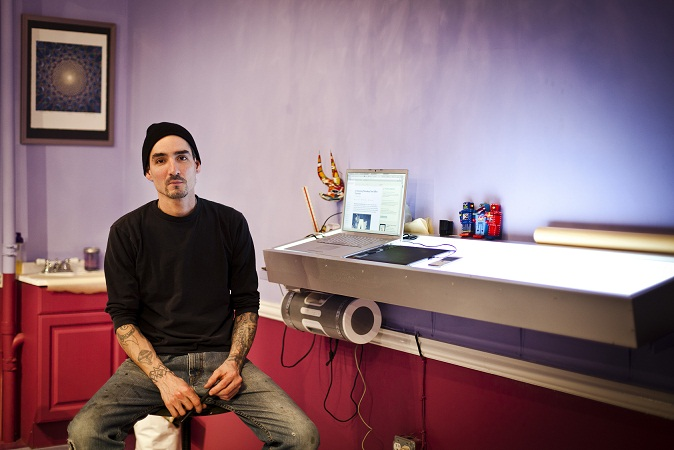
- Adal in Studio, 2012
- Born: 1973 (age 52–53)
- Occupations: tattoo artist, painter
- Website: Majestic Tattoo NYC Adal Hernandez

Adal Ray (formerly Adal Hernandez) is an American tattooist and visionary artist currently residing in New York City, where he owns and operates the Brooklyn studio Majestic Tattoo NYC. Adal was born in Chicago and raised between Texas and Chicago, where he attended the Art Institute of Chicago's Early College Program and completed his tattoo apprenticeship under Chicago's Tattoo Tom. Adal has been tattooing professionally since 1993, settling in New York in 1998.

In his 19 years as a tattoo artist, Adal has been featured in several body art-related publications, including Skin & Ink; Inked, and Tattoo Burst. He was featured on PBS in a special entitled "The Body Adorned," which also featured an American Museum of Natural History Exhibition on the history of body art, to which Adal contributed. Adal has also been featured in multiple non-tattoo related publications for his work in other media.

Majestic Tattoo NYC opened in early 2012 as a small studio specializing in custom, visionary, often psychedelic and fractal tattoos. The space also functions as an independent art gallery, displaying the work of both American and international artists. This double function represents Adal's goal of unifying the differing forms of artistic expression: in his words, "The tattoo renaissance has pushed the art form to new places."

== Early life ==
Adal was born in Chicago, IL, and spent his childhood split between Texas and Chicago. He began training himself to draw in the 5th grade through informal drawing competitions with his classmates, taking inspiration from action figures and objects found around his home. At the same time, Adal also became interested in comic book art, and could be found creating his own comic books, his most memorable creation being a blaxploitation action hero. Adal had an early interest in the art of Pablo Picasso and other famous modern artists, though it was his 7th grade art teacher in Brownsville, TX who exposed him to the more underground works of the New York pop art movement and Keith Haring. In high school, Adal moved back to Chicago, where he aspired to a career in creating socially conscious murals. In 1989, an opportunity to make this goal a reality presented itself when at age 16, Adal was able to meet Keith Haring when Haring traveled to Chicago to work on a mural project with high school students, titled "Keith Haring at the Pinnacle." Adal ended up contributing to the mural, as well as assisting Haring on two other murals in a hospital. As a memento, Haring and his photographer, Tseng Kwong Chi, both signed Adal's leather jacket.[11]

16 was also the age at which Adal first began to develop his lifelong interest in tattoo art. A friend, who was already an avid tattoo enthusiast, was impressed by Adal's sketches, and took him to meet Guy Aitchison, an established Chicago tattoo artist. Adal began hanging around the shop and started to gain his first in-depth knowledge about the art of tattooing from Guy, inspiring him to pursue a life as a tattoo artist.

Later on, Adal studied in an early college program at the Art Institute of Chicago before moving to Austin, TX. At age 18, Adal got a tattoo apprenticeship offer in Chicago, studying under Tattoo Tom. Since then, Adal has split his time at numerous tattoo studios in Austin, Chicago, and New York City. He currently owns and operates his own studio, Majestic Tattoo NYC, in the intersection of Bedford-Stuyvesant and Bushwick in Brooklyn, New York.

== See also ==
- List of tattoo artists
