= Bang Bang (tattoo artist) =

American celebrity tattoo artist

- Born: Keith Scott McCurdy; November 28, 1985 (age 40); Pottstown, Pennsylvania, U.S.
- Education: South Kent School
- Occupation: Tattoo artist
- Known for: Celebrity tattoos
- Children: 2
- Website: www.bangbangforever.com

Keith Scott "Bang Bang" McCurdy (born November 28, 1985) is an American celebrity tattoo artist based in New York City. He is known for his work with Rihanna, Cara Delevingne, Katy Perry, Justin Bieber, LeBron James, Adele, Miley Cyrus, Selena Gomez and Kylie Jenner.

== Early life ==
McCurdy was born to teenage parents Vincent LaCava and Susan McCurdy in Pottstown, Pennsylvania. Soon thereafter, his father left for college, while he and his mom moved to Claymont, Delaware, where she earned a living as a painter and eventually opened a cleaning business. The lifestyle his mother partook during McCurdy's childhood exposed him to an unsavory lifestyle, forcing him to grow up fast. At age 13, McCurdy entered South Kent, a Connecticut boarding school for boys, but was eventually expelled for cheating on a Spanish test and returned to Delaware to start his senior year at Mount Pleasant High School. However, he dropped out of high school to pursue his love of tattoos.

== Career ==
McCurdy got his first tattoo at the age of 15 after his parents honored a bargain that they would consent if he made the honor roll. The Superman logo was done for $180 at Tattoos by RC in Folsom, Pennsylvania. In 2004, he ordered himself a tattoo kit online and began practicing on himself, friends, and relatives. Only three months later he found a job at his father's friend's tattoo shop outside a nearby trailer park. The next year, he began working at Rage of the Needle in Minquadale, Delaware. He soon made a full commitment to being a tattoo artist by having a gun tattooed on either side of his neck, along with the lettering reading "Bang Bang", which resulted in his professional nickname.

Less than a year after launching his career, McCurdy moved to New York City. He had a hard time finding work at first, bouncing from one tattoo shop to the next. When he would show tattoo artists his portfolio, they had a hard time believing it was actually McCurdy's work because of how impressively the tattoos were done. He eventually found work at Crazy Fantasy in Greenwich Village, which he described as "the dirtiest, most disgusting, shittiest, most dilapidated vomitorium on that little strip." Soon after he moved to a nearby parlor called Whatever Tattoo, where he quickly earned a reputation as the best tattoo artist in the shop. It was there in 2007 that McCurdy first met Barbadian pop star Rihanna. She had originally wanted a Sanskrit prayer down the back of her legs, but he convinced her to get the tattoo on her hip instead. While Rihanna was getting the tattoo done, she was with a reporter, and many people started gathering around the tattoo shop's window watching her get it done. Rihanna's tattoo had changed his life and opened up many more opportunities for McCurdy. He credits his work with her as a catalyst leading to his notoriety among other celebrity clients, whom he frequently allows to tattoo him. He created very iconic tattoos with subject matter and body location that were copied endlessly, an example being the lion face tattooed on Cara Delevingne's index finger. She went in requesting the word "lion" along her finger, although McCurdy suggested instead that he tattoo the face of a lion.

As demand for his work grew, McCurdy went to work between several tattoo parlors, including Last Rites and East Side Ink. When his bid for ownership was spurned, he made plans to launch his own shop, a move which ultimately led to his firing. After about a decade of work around New York City, McCurdy opened Bang Bang Tattoo on Clinton Street in 2013, with investment money coming from his father. However, their relationship deteriorated quickly, and he was forced to restart the business in a new shop on Broome Street the following year. In 2015, McCurdy published a memoir and coffee table book titled Bang Bang: My Life in Ink. In 2018, he opened a second location on Grand Street in SoHo.

== Personal life ==
McCurdy has 2 daughters, Kumiko and Yukari.

== Publications ==
- Bang Bang: My Life in Ink (2015)

== See also ==
- List of tattoo artists
