= Henry Hate =

American musician

- Born: Henry Martinez Jr; July 16, 1968 (age 57); Orange, California
- Occupation: Tattoo Artist Visual Art
- Years active: 1990–present
- Website: www.henryhatefineart.com

Henry Hate, (born July 16, 1968) as Henry Martinez Jr., in Orange, California, is an American expatriate tattoo artist, artist and former musician living in London, England. Hate's high-profile clients include Amy Winehouse and fashion designer Alexander McQueen. A former employee of The Tom of Finland Foundation, he started his early career intending to be a fashion illustrator and erotic artist. Hate's fine art work has been showcased along with Banksy, Mr. Brainwash, Jamie Reid, and James Cauty.

== Life and career ==
Henry was born in the city of Orange to Mexican-German Father and a Mexican-Spanish heritage mother. Hate started his early art career with work that was mainly based in homoeroticism and was central in the early punk rock and queercore scene in Los Angeles from which he has since distanced himself. He started as an early volunteer and eventually working for the Tom of Finland Foundation. Controversy was created when Hate used female erotic art in the foundation's seasonal newsletter. This episode prompted several protests, a first of its kind, and Hate left the foundation soon after. He has stated in interviews that he worked on hardcore adult feature films to make ends meet, while landing himself a traditional apprenticeship for tattooing. It is not known whether he worked as a sexual performer in any adult films.

Hate migrated to London in 1998 where he worked in Soho. It was there that he cultivated his professional nickname Henry Hate. He opened his own tattoo parlour in Shoreditch, aptly named Prick!, in 2002, where he is currently based. In March 2009, The Sun ran a cover story on Henry Hate without his consent, revealing Hate's personal and private information on the back of Amy Winehouse's then tabloid troubles. This action allowed other news wire agencies to pick the story up again without his consent. Soon after, The Sun removed the article from its web archive. The case was settled out of court for an undisclosed amount. In 2010, Hate was hired by Nissan Motors to launch the Nissan Cube due to both their controversial profiles, creating the world's first "Ice Tattoo". Henry has also collaborated on several high-profile projects that saw him having his work turned into chocolate with Belgian Dominique Persoone, and collaborate with fashion photographer Nick Knight. Currently Henry Hate has started to delve into his fine art career, and become an ambassador for the Amy Winehouse Foundation working with the Winehouse family and the non profit organisation.
