= Rusty Skuse =

British tattooed woman

- Born: Janet Field; 20 December 1943
- Died: 12 July 2007 (aged 63)
- Known for: Tattoo artist Women's Royal Army Corps driver
- Spouse: Bill Skuse
- Awards: Most Tattooed Women Guinness World Record holder for 20 years

Janet Skuse (née Field; 20 December 1943 – 12 July 2007), known as Rusty Skuse, was known as the most tattooed woman in Britain.

== Biography ==
Skuse, a driver in the Women's Royal Army Corps based at Aldershot in Hampshire, had her first tattoo aged 17 in 1961, which resulted in her being put on a charge. By 1964 she had 62 tattoos and was becoming widely known. Soon she was spending more than half her Army pay on getting more tattoos from her future husband, Bill Skuse, at his studio in the amusement arcade in Aldershot's High Street. She turned down an offer from a showman in Glasgow, Scotland to become a tattooed attraction; however, the offer convinced her to get tattooed completely. Using £100 given to her by her mother as a 21st birthday present, Skuse spent the money on more tattoos, much to her mother's consternation.

== Recognition ==
For over twenty years she appeared in the Guinness World Records as Britain's most tattooed woman. At one time there was a life-sized waxwork of her displayed outside 'The Guinness World of Records' exhibition at the Trocadero in Piccadilly, London. She trained under her husband to become a tattoo artist in her own right. On their retirement Bill and Rusty Skuse opened a boarding kennel and stray dogs home in Norfolk. Rusty Skuse returned to tattooing for a period, running a private tattooing studio in Dereham, Norfolk. In 1979 she was the subject of a documentary titled Second Skin.

== Death ==
Skuse died in 2007, following a long battle with kidney disease.

== See also ==
- Nikole Lowe
