= Maud Wagner =

American circus performer

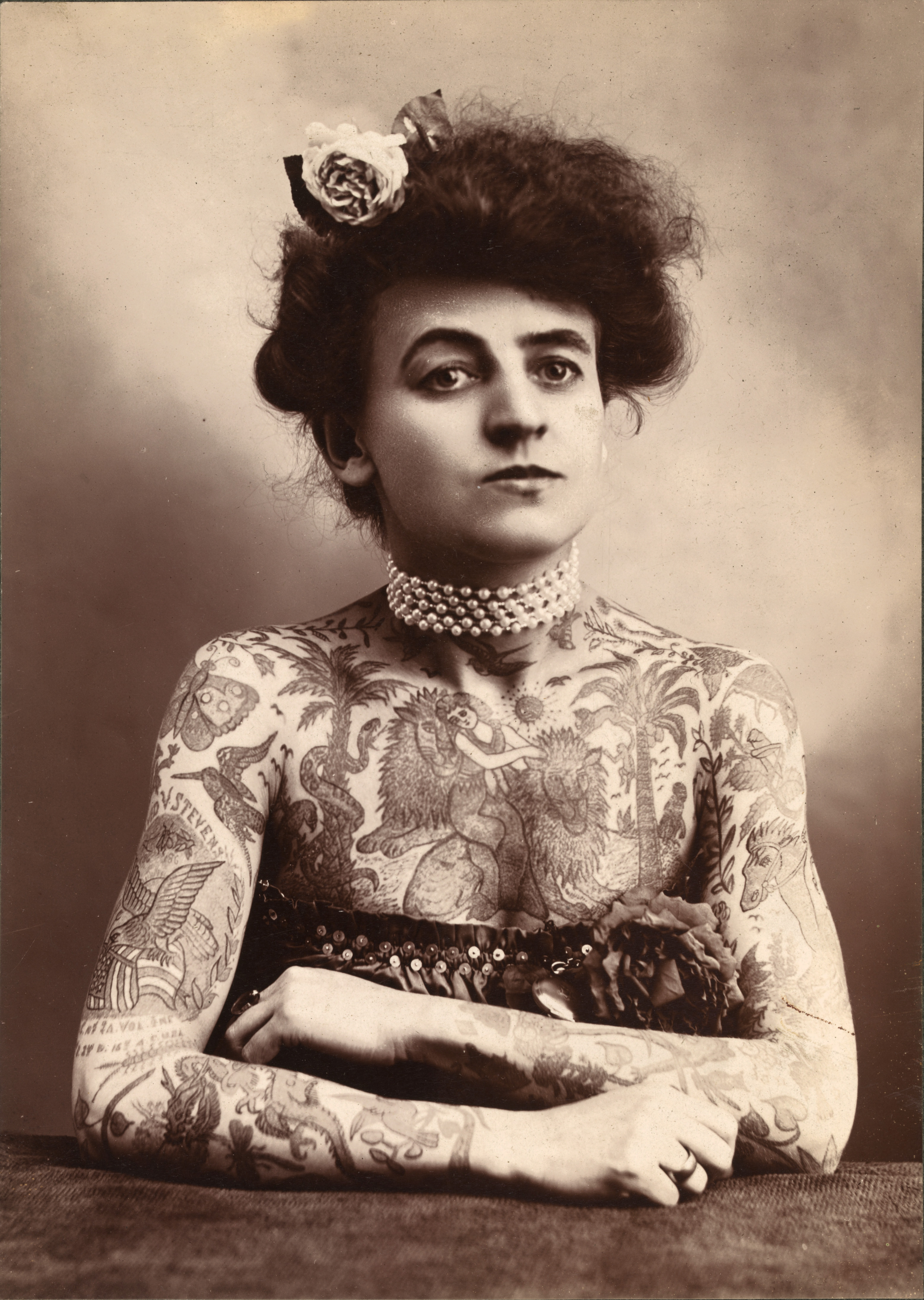
- Maud Wagner in c. 1907
- Born: Maud Stevens; February 12, 1877; Emporia, Kansas, U.S.
- Died: January 30, 1961 (aged 83); Lawton, Oklahoma, U.S.
- Known for: First female tattoo artist in the United States
- Spouse: Gus Wagner
- Children: 2

Maud Stevens Wagner (née Stevens; February 12, 1877 – January 30, 1961) was an American circus performer. She was the first known female tattoo artist in the United States.

== Life and career ==
Wagner was born in 1877, in Emporia, Kansas, to David Van Bran Stevens and Sarah Jane McGee.

Wagner was an aerialist and contortionist, working in numerous traveling circuses along with her sister, Dora Stevens. Together they formed a duo known as the Stevens Sisters, performing contortionist stunts alongside singing and acting in carnival skits. She met Gus Wagner—a tattoo artist who described himself as "the most artistically marked up man in America"—as they both traveled with circuses and sideshows performing in carnivals throughout the Midwest. Their meeting occurred sometime around or before 1903, when the first photographs of Maud and Gus together can be traced. Gus and Maud soon entered into a relationship and continued their travels as a trio act, now known as "Wagner and the Stevens Sisters", taking on management and promotion of their act on their own. During this time, Gus started teaching Maud the art of tattooing as well as tattooing her body himself.

In 1904 the trio moved to St. Louis, at the time was hosting the Louisiana Purchase Exposition (World's Fair), to take advantage of the influx of visitors induced by this event. They performed their act and tattooed from a shop in the city. During this period the Wagners eloped. Together they had a daughter, Lotteva in 1910, who started tattooing at the age of nine and went on to become a tattoo artist herself.

As an apprentice of her husband, Wagner learned how to give traditional "hokey-pokey" tattoos—despite the invention of the tattoo machine by Samuel O'Reilly on December 8, 1891—and became a tattooist herself. Together, the Wagners were two of the last tattoo artists to work by hand, without the aid of modern tattoo machines. Maud Wagner was the United States' first known female tattoo artist.

After leaving the circus, Maud and Gus Wagner traveled around the United States, working both as tattoo artists and "tattooed attractions" in vaudeville houses, county fairs and amusement arcades. They are credited with bringing tattoo artistry inland, away from the coastal cities and towns where the practice had started.

== Death ==
Maud Wagner died of cancer twenty years after her husband, on January 30, 1961, at her daughter's home, in Lawton, Oklahoma. She is buried at the Homestead Cemetery in Homestead Township, Chase County, Kansas.
