= Jacci Gresham =

American tattoo artist (born 1951)

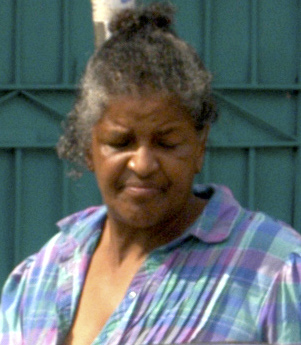
- Gresham in 2005
- Born: October 28, 1951 (age 74); Flint, Michigan, U.S.
- Occupation: Tattoo artist

Jacci Gresham (born 1951) is an American tattoo artist, and the first known Black female tattoo artist in the United States. Her shop, Aart Accent Tattoos & Body Piercing, is Louisiana's oldest continuous tattoo business. At the time of its opening, she was one of only five practicing female tattoo artists in the United States, and the only woman doing tattooing in New Orleans. In 2011, she was honored as a Pioneer of Female Tattoo Artists. She is from Flint, Michigan. She has been based in New Orleans since 1976.

== Early life and career ==
Gresham enjoyed drawing as a child. In college, she studied architecture and engineering. After graduating, she began working for General Motors designing floor plans for car dealerships. At the age of 25, while working at an engineering firm, she met Ajit "Ali" Singh. Both later visited New Orleans in search of work, but were not successful. At the time, there were only two tattoo shops in New Orleans. Upon this discovery, Gresham and Singh then opened what was then the third tattoo shop in New Orleans. When they opened this shop, Gresham had no experience, and did not even have a tattoo of her own. Subsequently, the two existing shops have closed, making Aart Accent the oldest in New Orleans.

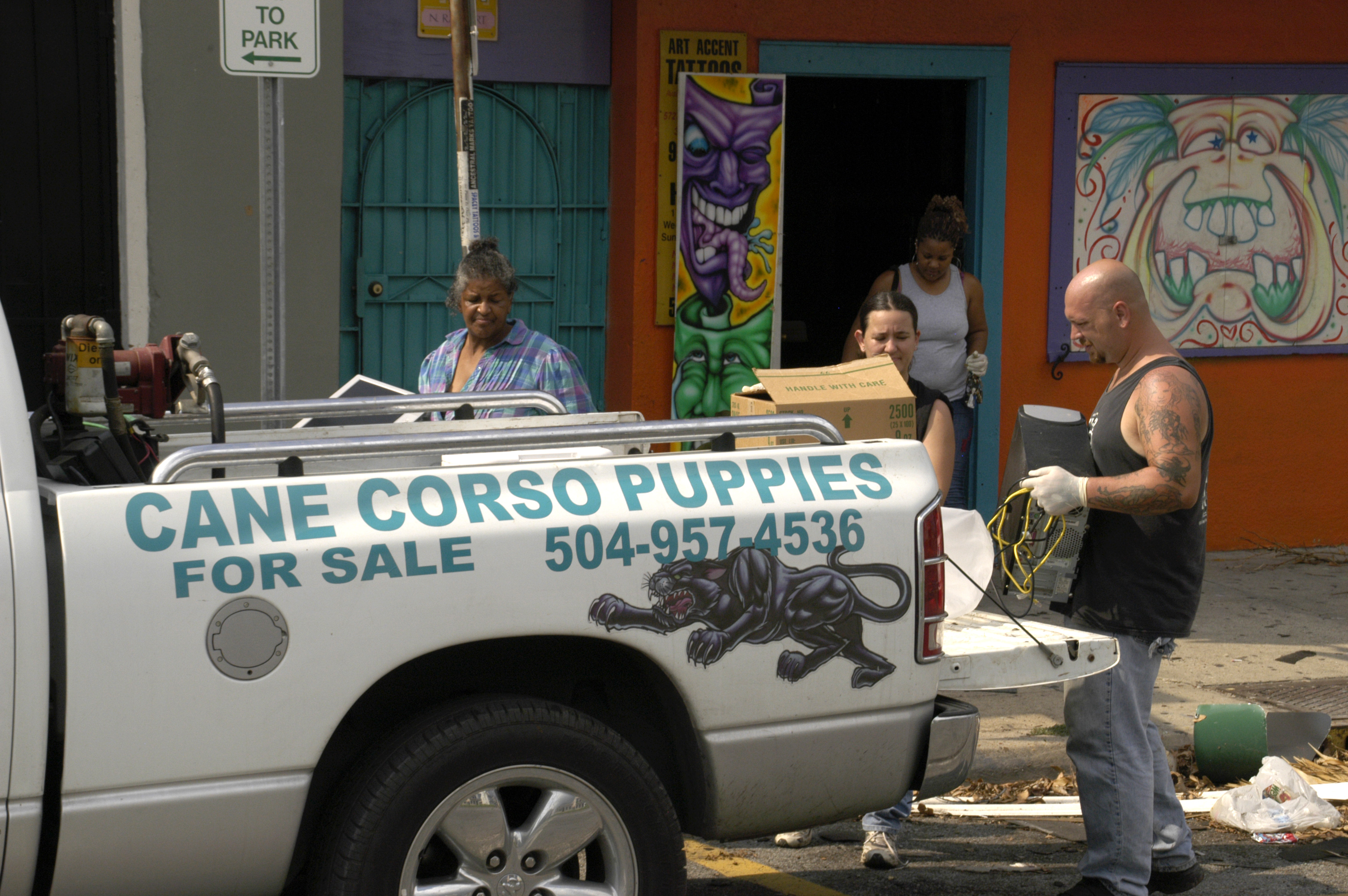
Jacci Gresham in front of her shop near Rampart Street

== 1950s–1970s ==
Between the 1950s–1970s, women in the tattoo industry were very scarce. Women only gained acceptance into tattoo shops if they were dating or married to one of the tattoo artists. In the early 1970s, Gresham became a pioneer of female tattoo artists who helped pave the way for the rise of other female artists entering the industry.
