= Horiyoshi III =

Japanese tattoo artist

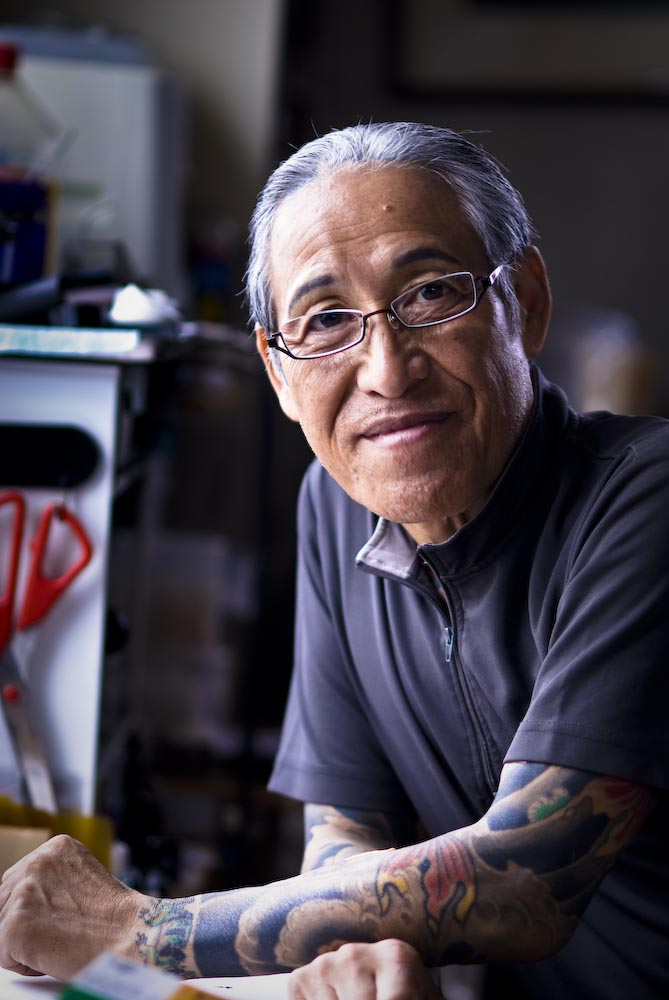
- Horiyoshi III in his Isecho studio 2009 (photo:Horikitsune)
- Born: Yoshihito Nakano; 9 March 1946 (age 80); Shimada, Shizuoka, Japan
- Citizenship: Japanese
- Occupation: Tattoo artist
- Known for: Irezumi
- Spouse: Mayumi Nakano
- Website: www.ne.jp/asahi/tattoo/horiyoshi3

Horiyoshi III (Japanese: 三代目彫よし, Hepburn: Sandaime Horiyoshi; born 1946 as Yoshihito Nakano (中野 義仁)) is a horishi (tattoo artist), specializing in full-body Japanese traditional tattoos (horimono).

== Biography ==
Nakano was inspired when he saw a yakuza (Japanese gangster) with a full-body tattoo in a public bathhouse when he was a young boy, "about eleven or twelve." This inspired him to visit legendary tattoo artist Yoshitsugu Muramatsu, also known as Shodai Horiyoshi of Yokohama. Nakano got his own tattoo from Horiyoshi II—Shodai Horiyoshi's son—and lead to Nakano becoming Horiyoshi I's apprentice at age 25.

Horiyoshi III is the second tattooist to be granted the honorific title, which passes from master to apprentice. Muramatsu bestowed this title upon Nakano in 1971. The tattooist affixation Hori means to engrave or "to carve."

His wife, Mayumi Nakano, is the general manager of his Bunshin Tattoo Museum, in Yokohama.

== Works ==
The creatures I draw only come alive on somebody's skin. This is why I never show my designs as so-called art. I draw simply for fun and to have samples to show my clients so they can pick a new design. The creatures depicted take the person's breath away once they are on his or her skin — and then the two start breathing together, in unison. Human history alters the look of the animals and plants I paint, and when the person wearing them dies, so too do they.

— Horiyoshi III, Words to Live By, The Japan Times Online

At Horiyoshi's studio in Yokohama, Japan, tattoos are outlined mostly freehand using an electric needle. He did the outlining by hand until the late 1990s. His friendship with Don Ed Hardy, started in the mid-1980s, lead to Horiyoshi's adoption of electric machines.

Shading and color is added using the traditional tebori, or Japanese hand tattooing, technique. He restricts his motifs to the classical repertoire of the vast variety of traditional Japanese stories and designs: peonies, koi, dragons, tennyo, etc. Horiyoshi feels responsible for keeping the classic repertoire alive, "one prick at a time."

Horiyoshi III's work can cost tens of thousands of dollars, and may require weekly hour-long visits over the course of several years to complete.

His work is now limited to finishing existing clients' tattoos.

Among Horiyoshi III's published works are the following books: Ed Hardy published Tattoo Designs of Japan, Nihonshuppansha published 36 Ghosts, 108 Heroes of the Suikoden, 100 Demons, 58 Musha, The Namakubi (a collection of drawings of severed heads). In addition, his American-Japanese former apprentice Horitaka has published books on the masters work which are Bushido, Tattoos of the Floating World, Studying Horiyoshi 3, Dragons by Horiyoshi3, The Horiyoshi3 Sketchbook, Horiyoshi3 Photobook. German former apprentice Horikitsune, published Horiyoshi III's books between 2009 and 2015 under the publishing label Kofuu-Senju Publications Ltd, now renamed Kosei Publications LTD, which were Ryushin, Kokoro, Osen, Osen 2. Tattoolife press published his Ryuki dragon book in 2016.

In 2012, Somerset House held an exhibition of Horiyoshi's silk scroll paintings. The exhibition - titled 'Kokoro: The Art of Horiyoshi III - was organised by his former apprentice Horikitsune, and Italian Tattooer Claudia dei Sabe.

Other exhibitions: Harajuku Tokyo, the "Korouten exhibit" in which Horiyoshi III partners with fellow artists the like of Hajime Sorayama, usually every October.

Horiyoshi III now only has one, last apprentice, his own son Souryou Horiyoshi IV.

The master strongly advises that all former apprentices are no longer part of his family. These were - amongst a few others: Horikara (Mikado), Horitora (P.Chuo), Horihito, Horinao, Horitaka (T.Kitamura), Horitomo (K.Kitamura), Horikiku, Horiken and Horikitsune (A.Reinke).
