= Lokesh Verma =

Indian tattoo artist

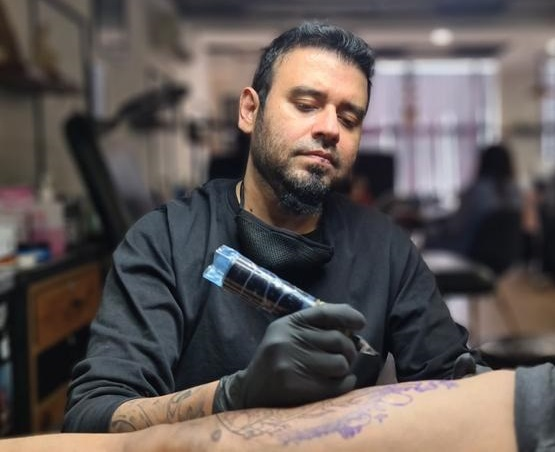
- Born: Delhi, India
- Education: Master of Business Administration; Bachelor of Commerce
- Alma mater: Delhi University; Sri Aurobindo College
- Occupation: Tattoo artist
- Known for: Co-founder of Heartwork Tattoo Festival
- Website: www.tattoosnewdelhi.com devilztattoozluxembourg.com

Lokesh Verma is an Indian tattoo artist. He is best known for pioneering soundwave tattoos in India. He is one of the founders of Heartwork Tattoo Festival, India’s only international tattoo festival. Verma also established a studio in Luxembourg.

== Background and career ==
Lokesh was born and raised in Delhi, India. His father worked in a security department, while mother was a teacher. He completed his school education in Delhi and took admission to Delhi University in 2000. He has held several odd jobs.

He started practicing tattooing in 2003 as a hobby while pursuing his MBA during which he also worked at the local McDonalds by day and as a disc jockey by night in order to save money to purchase his first equipment.

He opened a studio first in South Delhi’s Greater Kailash area in 2008 and then in Gurugram in 2013. In 2011, he tattooed world record attempt recognized by Guinness World Records for the most number of flags to be tattooed on human body held by Guinness Rishi. He is one of the founders of the annual Heartwork Tattoo Festival, India’s only international tattoo festival. He is the owner of Devilz Tattooz, India.

Lokesh has traveled to 15 countries and tutored many artists. Some of celebrities and cricketers he has inked include Ishant Sharma, Shikhar Dhawan, Swara Bhaskar, Remo D'Souza, and Tapsee Pannu.
