= Thomas Pendelton =

American tattoo artist and television personality

- Born: April 28, 1971 (age 53); Anaheim, California, U.S.
- Occupations: Tattoo artist; television personality
- Spouse: Monica Rizzolo (m. 2005)

Thomas Pendelton (born April 28, 1971) is an American tattoo artist and television personality. He starred in the A&E reality television show Tattoo Highway.

== Career ==
Pendelton apprenticed under Rick Walters at Bert Grimm's Tattoo in Long Beach, California.

He was a featured tattoo artist on the television show Inked filmed in Las Vegas. He starred in a reality television show titled Tattoo Highway on A&E in 2009.

He is the founder of a clothing line called Ministry of Ink.
