= Vyvyn Lazonga =

- Born: Beverly Bean; March 18, 1947 (age 79); Seattle, WA
- Other name: Madame Lazonga
- Known for: Tattoo artist
- Website: madamelazongastattoo.com

Vyvyn Lazonga is a tattoo artist who began her career in Seattle in the early 1970s and was trained by Danny Danzl. She was the first woman to work for herself in the industry, not her husband or another male shop owner. She worked in San Francisco and was tattooed by Ed Hardy in the 70s. She won the award for Best Tattooed Female in 1978 for his work. Later she was fortunate enough to meet Horiyoshi II at one of Lyle Tuttle's parties before returning in 1989 to open her studio in Seattle.

She has advocated the use of tattoos to cover mastectomy scars as an aid to recovery.

== Historical significance ==
When she began tattooing, there were very few women who had tattoos, not to mention who were working as tattoo artists. When she opened her studio in 1979, there were only a few women tattooing on the west coast. She had a difficult time being treated as an equal in her craft and acquiring a full apprenticeship. Her work opened many doors for women in the tattoo industry, and is still seen as an example of a fine artist working in the tattoo medium. She was also a pioneer in the use of large-scale full-body tattoos in the West. Victoria Lautman has cited her as an artist who helped "to shift tattoos away from fashionable little rainbows, flowers, and unicorns to the larger, fine-arts-related custom designs."

She was also heavily tattooed at a time when it was unusual to see women with major tattoo work outside of sideshows. Asked about the public's perception of her full-sleeve tattoos, she said "I always felt strong and powerful about it, and I still do. But I try to keep my arms covered if I'm taking care of business -- I sorta wear a uniform according to what I'm doing. I want to get my business done quickly and easily, and I don't like having any hindrance or prejudice against me" (Vale and Juno 1989:125).

In her words:

I have always done art, ever since I could remember, from the age of about 2. Anything I could pick up and draw with I did. I remember once I got in trouble for drawing on all of the furniture and walls with crayons when I was about 3. The tattoo muse struck me in the early 1970s after I had seen an article done about tattoos in a men's magazine. The article was on Cliff Raven and his work. At that time there were no tattoo magazines so this venue seemed to be the only happening way for a tattooist to show their work.

I first tattooed on the original "skid road" in Seattle. It was called that because around the turn of the century when they were building the city, they would skid the lumber down the hill to the waterfront where it would be cut and processed for all the new buildings. This became the hub of nightlife for all the sailors during WWI and WWII. My shop is now located in one of the main historical buildings in the Pike Place Market, about 2 blocks from the waterfront. It's also about 2 blocks from where I started out on 1st Ave., skid road in Seattle. I learned tattooing from one of the old timers, C.J. Danny Danzl, who was a sailor during WWII and retired seaman with Foss Tug Boat Company. When I first heard that someone was opening a tattoo shop in Seattle I immediately ran down there to talk with him to just feel the situation out. I approached him with the idea of me being his "Go For" and helper. He really liked the idea, so that is how it started. It never occurred to me that you could create works of art on the skin until I had seen Cliff Raven's work. I thought how beautiful it would be to create not only a work of art but to be able to carry a talisman around on your skin until you died. This seemed like a very powerful way to make the ultimate affirmation for yourself. After serving a 7-year apprenticeship with Danny I struck out on my own and decided to take tattooing off of skid road to a neighborhood called Capital Hill. I had that shop for a few years and then moved around after that and wound up in San Francisco. Living and working in San Francisco was like going to school in a way. I got more streetwise. I had a shop in the outer Mission for several years and learned to adapt to Hispanic culture. After a couple of years of that I moved to lower Haight Street and started developing a very good clientele base. I made friends with some of the local tattooists there like Henry Goldfield, Ed Hardy, Bill Salmon, Lyle Tuttle, Erno and Captain Don. It was fun times, especially when Lyle would have some of his parties and all the tattoo groupies would be hanging out outside begging to get in. I met Kurinomo, (Horiyoshi II) when he was still alive at one of Lyle's parties. It was such a great honor. After the earthquake of '89 I moved back to Seattle. My place was pretty well ruined in the earthquake so I packed up what I could and moved back to Seattle where I knew I could start over very easily. That was when I opened a shop in Pike Place Market and I have been happy here ever since.

I recently changed my business name from Vyvyn's Tattoo to Madame Lazonga's Tattoo, because I had that name for many years early on in my career but had changed it to Vyvyn's for numerological reasons. Now I feel it's time to go back to Madame Lazonga because it sort of conjures up it's [sic?] own mythological imaginings and it's more playful. I have also recently opened a larger shop in the Market and added some talented artists. I'm hoping to establish a top line tattoo shop where there is a lot of creativity as well as varied and talented artists working as a team to reach for new things in the tattoo world.

== Current works ==
Lazonga has been featured in many magazines and books and currently writes columns for various tattoo magazines, including a regular column in Skin and Ink. She has also won numerous awards, including the artist's choice award at the 2005 National Tattoo Association convention. She still owns and operates her own studio in a historic building in the Pike Place market, in Seattle.

== Publications ==
2015 "100 Years of Tattoos," by David McComb, Laurence King Publishing Ltd

2015 "World Atlas of Tattoo," by Anna Felicity Friedman, Yale University Press

2014 Stylist Magazine, "Vyvyn Lazonga: La Première á Avoir Jeté L'encre," May Issue

2014 Tätowier Magazine, "Kosmetische Tätowierungen," January Issue

2010 "Inked," Inked Scene, Interview, April Issue

2010 Tattoo Flash, "The Time of Her Life," July Issue

2010 Skin Art, "Lessons from a Legend," Issue #130

2007 Tattoo Magazine, "Vyvyn Lazonga," April Issue #221

2007 San Francisco Gate, Interview: "Finding My Religion," February 20 Issue

2006 Skin & Ink

2006 Tattoo Magazine

2006-2008 Skin & Ink, Staff Writer

2005 Venus Zine, Summer Issue

2005 Tattoo Magazine

2005 Total Tattoo Magazine, August Issue

2004 The Market News, August Issue

2004 Tattoo Flash

2002 "Tattoo Road Trip," by Bob Baxter, Schiffer Publishing

2002 International Tattoo Art Magazine, "Vyvyn Lazonga: In a Studio All Her Own," November Issue

2002 New York Times, Sunday Style Section, December Issue

1998-1999, The Tattooist's Yearbook, Milano, Italy

1998-1999, CNN Broadcast, "Women of the Ink"

1998 "Bodies of Subversion," by Margo Mifflin, Powerhouse Books

1998 International Tattoo Magazine

1998 Skin & Ink

1996 "New Tattoo," by Victoria Lautman, Abbeville Press

1996 Skin Art

1996 Tattoo Magazine

1993 Tattoo Magazine

1993 Skin Art

1991 Elle Magazine

1989 RE/search, "Modern Primitives," by Andrea Juno & V. Vale, Issue #12

1988 Marks of Civilization, Museum of Cultural History, Los Angeles, CA

1977 "The Tattooists," by Albert L. Morse, San Francisco, CA

1976 Esquire Magazine
