= Manu Farrarons =

French-born Polynesian tattoo artist

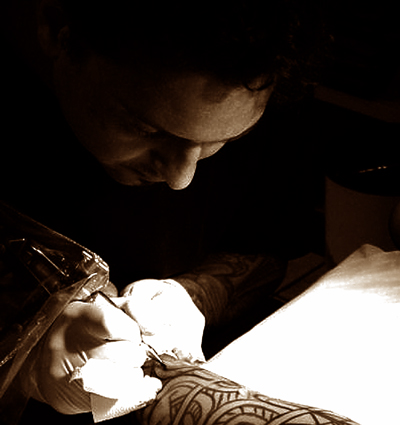
Manu Farrarons

Manu Farrarons (born 1967) is a French-born Polynesian tattoo artist. Farrarons' art is a mix of Polynesian styles and designs, mostly Tahitian and Marquesan, which he mixes with Māori and Hawaiian influences.

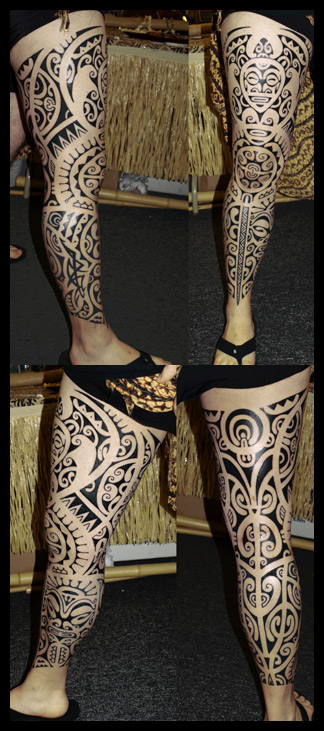
Full leg tattooed by Manu Farrarons. Freehand creation.

== Biography ==
Born in 1967 in Cholet, France, to a painter mother and tattoo artist father, he spent his childhood in Tahiti and was immersed in Polynesian life and culture. At an early age he started drawing Tahitian and Marquesan designs.

After finishing high school, he studied to become a school teacher. Even during his time as a school teacher, he increased his knowledge of Polynesian designs by researching them in Tahiti and Hawaii, where he had access to anthropological archives stored at Bishop Museum of Honolulu.

Manu has been tattooing professionally since 1991, after he left his job as a school teacher in order to fulfill his passion. His father opened the first professional tattoo shop in Tahiti, which he owned until he passed it down to Manu. He started tattooing when he was age 15. He took over his father’s tattoo shop in Papeete, Tahiti, and renamed it "Mana’o Tattoo". In the Tahitian language the word "Mana’o" means "idea, knowledge or thought".

== Prizes and honors ==
- 2018 - Featured in December issue of Tattoo Magazine USA
- 2016 - Best of Day - NZ Tattoo & Art Festival, Taranaki, New Zealand
- 2016 - Best Tribal artist - Art Gathering LA, Long Beach CA
- 2015 - Best Tribal Artist - INK N IRON, Long Beach CA
- 2015 - Air Tahiti Nui ambassador
- 2013 - 1st Place open category Polynesia Tatau Convention, Tahiti
- 2011 - Best Tribal Artist - INK & IRON, Long Beach CA
- 2010 - 2nd Best Polynesian (male) Sydney Tattoo Expo, Australia
- 2010 - 2nd Best Polynesian (female) Sydney Tattoo Expo, Australia
- 2008 - Best Tribal Artist - INK & IRON, Long Beach CA
- 2005 - Best of day, Tattoonesia convention, Moorea, French Polynesia

== Gallery ==
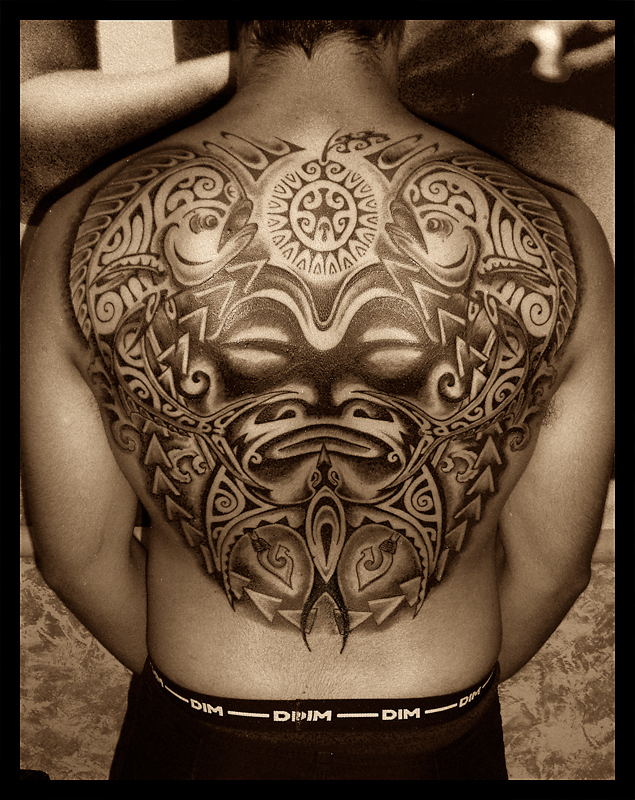
"Ocean Spirit" Full back by Manu Farrarons

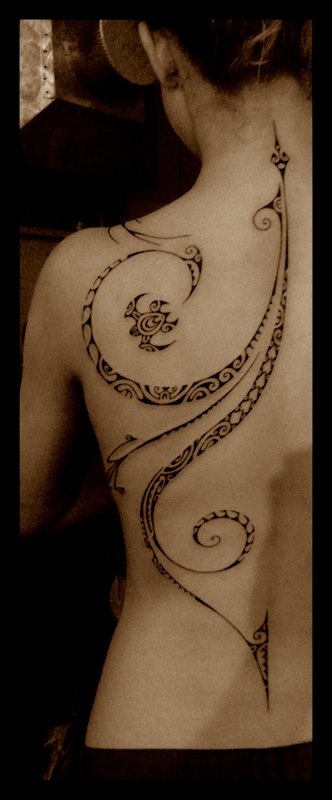
Flowing feminine freehand tattoo by Manu Farrarons

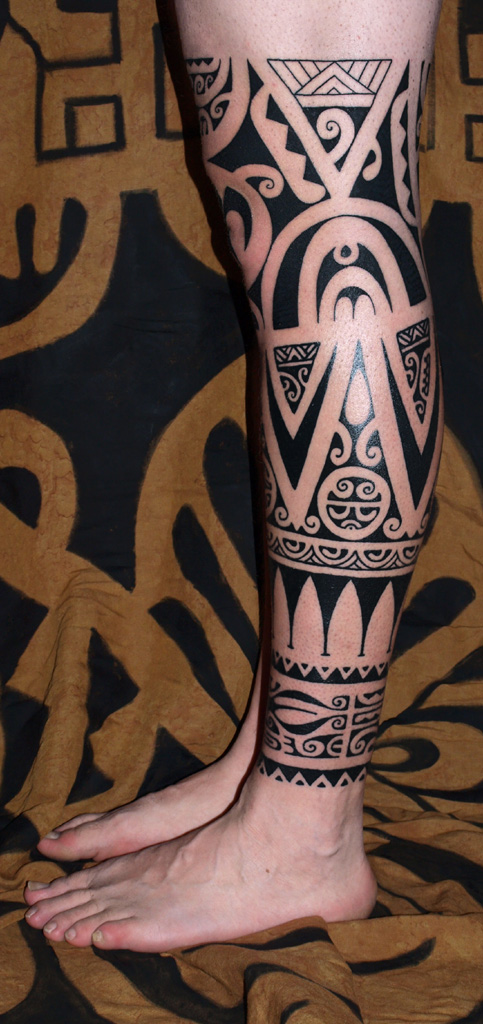
Leg tattooed by Manu Farrarons. Freehand
