= Cliff Raven =

American tattoo artist (1932–2001)

- Born: Clifford H. Ingram; August 24, 1932; East Chicago, Indiana
- Died: November 28, 2001 (aged 69); 29 Palms, California
- Other name: Cliff Raven Ingram
- Occupation: Tattoo artist

Cliff Raven Ingram (August 24, 1932 – November 28, 2001) was one of a handful of tattoo artists (along with Sailor Jerry Collins and Don Ed Hardy) who pioneered the adoption of the Japanese tattoo aesthetic in the United States. Born in Indiana as Clifford H. Ingram, Ingram later shortened his first name and adopted his business name of "Raven" as his legal middle name, largely to facilitate mail delivery.

== Biography ==
After attending Indiana University and receiving a BA in Fine Arts, Cliff took on part-time contract work in print and graphic arts for Chicago's Spiegel retail stores amongst other projects. Cliff gave himself his first tattoo and later received tattoos from the legendary Phil Sparrow and soon found himself immersed in the tattoo subculture. After some part-time work as a tattoo artist in an arcade Cliff went on to open the Cliff Raven Tattoo Studio which is now known as Chicago Tattoo and Piercing Company. Cliff also founded Chicago Tattoo Supply and ran it out of his shop. To this day Chicago Tattoo and Piercing Company is the oldest continuously running Tattoo Studio in Chicago and has some of Cliff's original flash still hanging on the walls.

After winning the Tattoo Artist of the Year award from the First Annual International Tattoo Convention in February 1976, Cliff and his partner Buddy Mac McFall, and partner Dale Grande bought out Lyle Tuttle’s Sunset Strip Tattoo Shop in California as Cliff was looking to expand his work in the area of full body Japanese aesthetic Tattooing. Cliff subsequently swapped his interest in the Chicago operations for a full ownership of the West coast operations. He and a partner quickly established Tattoo Works—two sister studios, with one in Los Angeles (Cliff Raven Studios, now known as Sunset Strip Tattoo) which was, for years, located on the edge of West Hollywood on the famed Sunset Strip, and one in San Francisco (now defunct). While in Hollywood, Cliff had various Hollywood clientele, and he tattooed iconic celebrities such as Cher, Ringo Starr and many others. The Cliff Raven Studio was one of only six studios featured in the 1982 publication The Rock Star Tattoo Encyclopedia, by Patricia Steur, who stated, "In other words - this is one of THE places throughout the world where it's worth going to get a tattoo."

Throughout his career, Cliff mentored other prominent tattoo artists such as Bob Oslon, Pat Fish, Larry "Bone$" Haddick, Robert Benedetti, Robert "Mad Dog" Roberts, Bruce Lee, and Greg James, amongst others. Cliff was unusual in that he was an openly gay man in a profession that, at the time, was strongly homophobic.

In 1985, Cliff semi-retired from tattooing and moved to 29 Palms, California. There he wrote editorial cartoons for the Hi-Desert Star and ran a used/rare bookstore, Raven's Books, until his death in 2001. While retired, he infrequently continued to tattoo a select group of long-term clients who sought him out although he was largely withdrawn from the world of tattooing. His legacy lives on at The Chicago Tattoo Co., 1017 w. Belmont Avenue in Chicago, one block west of the original location.

== Cultural impact and legacy ==
Raven was interviewed on a 1978 episode of The Jim Nabors Hour, which is available for streaming on Amazon Prime. Dick Clark and Rodney Bingenheimer appeared on the same episode.

An oral history and some of Raven's tattooing memorabilia is housed at the Leather Archives & Museum in Chicago.
