= Horiyasu =

Japanese tattoo artist (born 1953)

Asakusa Horiyasu
- 彫やす
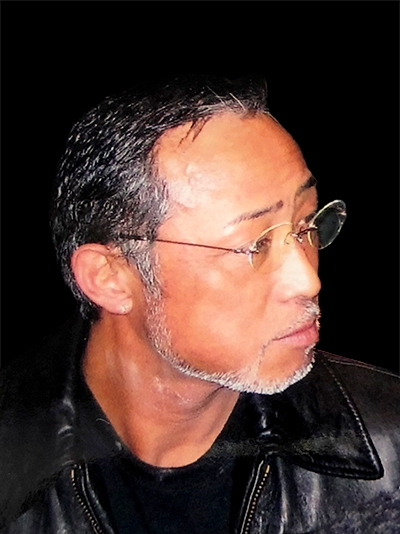
- Horiyasu at the Milan Tattoo Convention, 2007
- Born: Shinji Yasuda; 1953 (age 72–73); Hyogo Prefecture, Kobe City
- Style: Irezumi
- Website: www.horiyasu.com

Horiyasu (Japanese: 彫やす, Hepburn: Horiyasu; born 1953) is a Japanese tattooist, specializing in Irezumi (traditional Japanese tattoos). He is one of the most respected contemporary tattooists in Japan.

== Biography ==
Horiyasu, otherwise known as Asakusa Horiyasu, was a samurai-sword smith. He started working with blades at the age of 20 and mastered the craft for 16 years in Iwate Prefecture. He got his first tattoo at the age of 21. Horiyasu turned to tattooing at the age of 36.

He learned by studying works of such Ukiyo-e artists as Utagawa Kuniyoshi, Tsukioka Yoshitoshi and Katsushika Hokusai. In a 2013 Skin Deep Magazine interview he recalled that at first he didn't know anything and learned by watching an older horishi in Morioka. At first he was doing tattoos by hand (tebori), but learned how to work with the tattoo machine from Gifu Horihiro. In an interview with Tattoo Master magazine he acknowledged that “the edge of the sword teeth, the tattoo needle point… the parallels in the tactile sensation when one makes swords, and when one tattoos”.

Unlike some of the traditional masters who will only accept clients by introduction, he became known for working with foreigners. In 2004, he travelled to New York to take part in the New York Tattoo Convention, where he won two top prizes. In the following years he took part in various tattoo conventions around the world, including conventions in New York, Milan, San Jose, China and Taiwan.

In 2011, Horiyasu's works were featured in BloodWork: Bodies, a limited edition book series showing works of 53 of the best masters from all over the world, published by Analog Tattoo Arts Kolectiv.

== Style ==
Horiyasu executes only large-scale pieces. His style is described as bold and striking.

He is mainly focused on traditional tattooing themes such as Buddhist deities, dragons, tigers, samurai warriors, historical protective personalities, water and floral motifs (such as goldfish and peonies or carps), working mostly for male clients. Horiyasu often uses vivid colors that radiate from the skin. He is also known for using colors of the darker end of the spectrum, which create a heavy opacity.

Despite his use of traditional imagery, Horiyasu uses a tattoo machine rather than the tebori needles. In a 2013 interview with Japanese tattoo artist Genko for Tattoo Society magazine he recalled that for the first year he worked with tebori needles and it wasn't practical so he switched to an Ed Hardy Magnetic machine. Some time around 2011 he started using a coil machine. Horiyasu also explained that machines allow “an infinite number of settings, research and techniques.” He thinks that working with the machine is not only quicker but also inflicts less amount of pain.

== Awards ==
Horiyasu has participated in various tattoo conventions and competitions such as the New York Tattoo Convention, where he received first place for “Best Overall” in 2007 as well as first place for “Best Chest or Back”. Also in 2007, he won three first place awards at the Milan Tattoo Convention and first place “Best Bodysuit” at the San Jose Tattoo Convention. In 2013, he won first prize for the "Best Back Piece or Full Body" nomination at the Mondial du Tatouage Paris Tattoo Convention and won first place for "Best Color" and "Best Overall" at the first Hong Kong China Tattoo Convention.

== Bibliography ==
- Izumi, Akiba (December 2003). 日本伝統刺青・浅草彫やすの世界 [Traditional Japanese Tattooing. The World of Asakusa Horiyasu] (in Japanese). Japan: Core Magazine. pp. 95–103. ISBN 978-4877346829.
- McCabe, Michael (November 2005). "Tokyo Shita-machi Culture and the Tattoos of Asakusa Horiyasu". Japanese Tattooing Now: Memory and Transition. USA: Schiffer Publishing. pp. 140–150. ISBN 9780764321429.
- Ishiki, Shinobu (2006). Best Tattoo Collection (in Japanese). KM Agency. ISBN 9784861352713.
- Okazaki, Manami (May 14, 2008). "Horiyasu – traditional spirits with contemporary sensibilities". Tattoo in Japan: Traditional and Modern Styles. Editions Reuss. pp. 35–36. ISBN 978-3934020641.
- Okazaki, Manami (2009). "Horiyasu: From swords to Suikoden". Tattoo Master (4): 28–34.
- Lee, Adrian (2011). BloodWork: Bodies. Analog Tattoo Arts Kolectiv. ISBN 978-0972857857.
- Kaplan, Michael B. (2011). Kakoulas, Marisa (ed.). Tattoo World. Abrams Books. p. 40. ISBN 978-0-8109-9789-9.
- Okazaki, Manami (October 25, 2013). Wabori, Traditional Japanese Tattoo: Classic Japanese tattoos from the masters. Kingyo Press. ISBN 9789881250742.
- Aigbedion, Irenae A. (2013). "The Art of Crime (Senior Theses)". Trinity College (Connecticut). pp. 20–21. Archived from the original on September 11, 2015.
- McLaren, Hayley (March 20, 2015). "Needling Between Social Skin and Lived Experience: An Ethnographic Study of. Tattooing In Downtown Tokyo (Doctoral Dissertation)" (PDF). Hitotsubashi University. Archived from the original (PDF) on April 2, 2019.
