= Tattoo artist =

Individual who applies permanent decorative tattoos

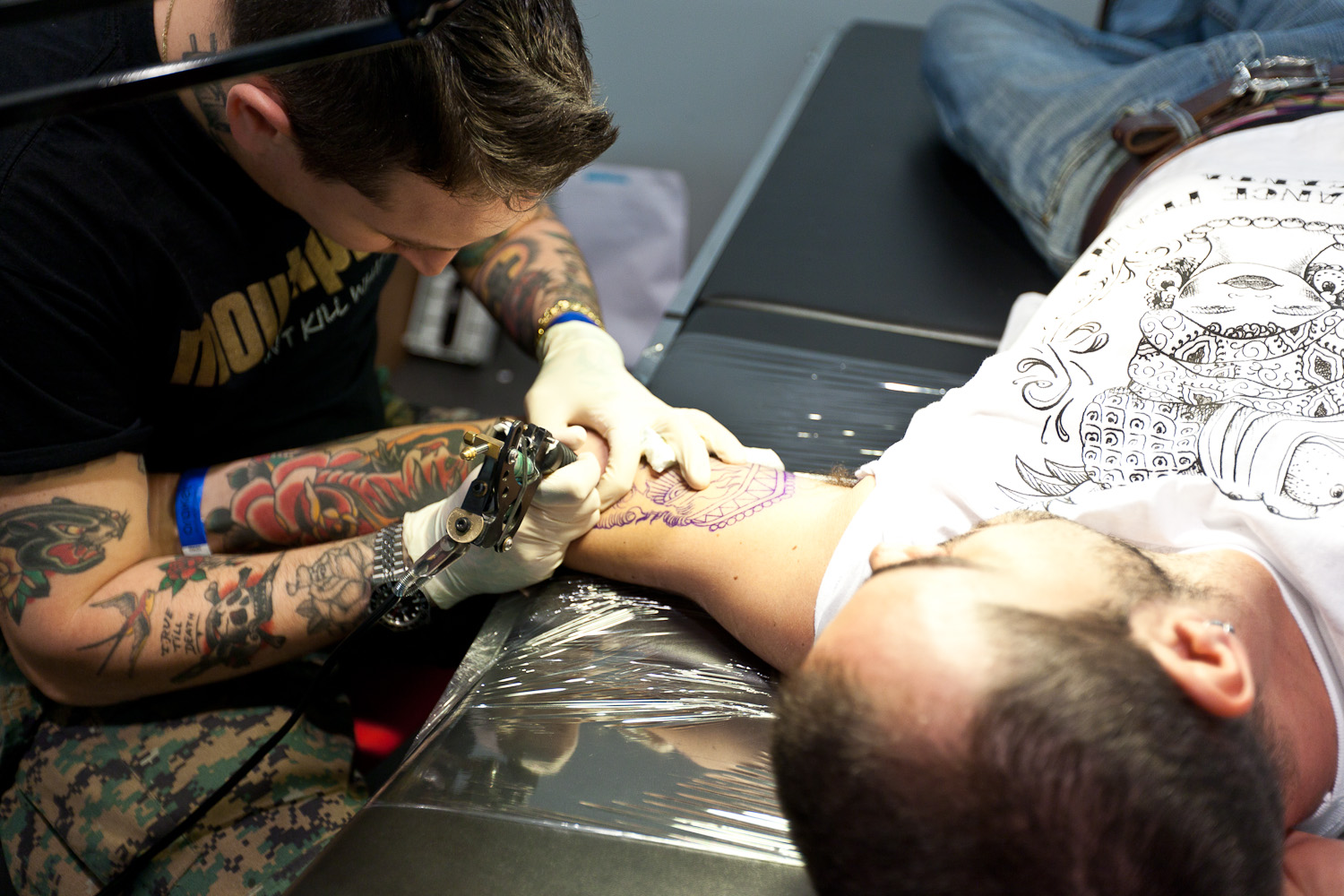
Tattoo artist working at the Florence Tattoo Convention, Italy, 2010

A tattoo artist (also tattooer or tattooist) is an individual who applies permanent decorative tattoos, often in an established business called a "tattoo shop", "tattoo studio" or "tattoo parlour". Tattoo artists usually learn their craft via an apprenticeship under a trained and experienced mentor.

== Apprenticeships ==
A tattoo artist traditionally earns the title by completing an apprenticeship under the strict guidelines of an experienced senior tattoo artist. The typical recommended length of tattoo apprenticeship is a minimum of three years. The apprentice will be trained in sanitation and proper safety techniques, typically during the first six months to a year of the apprenticeship. During this time, the apprentice is not allowed to tattoo, but will be expected to maintain the cleanliness of the studio and learn by observation. The cost of apprenticing can range from free labor around the shop to tens of thousands of dollars. Apprentices are generally expected to be excellent at drawing, with an ability to excel at customizing design ideas and genres, as well as various other styles of art in general.

== Artwork ==
Tattoo artists may use flash (pre-drawn images), often adapting the design based on a customer's requests, or work with customers to create original tattoo designs based on customer ideas and preferences.

== Tools ==
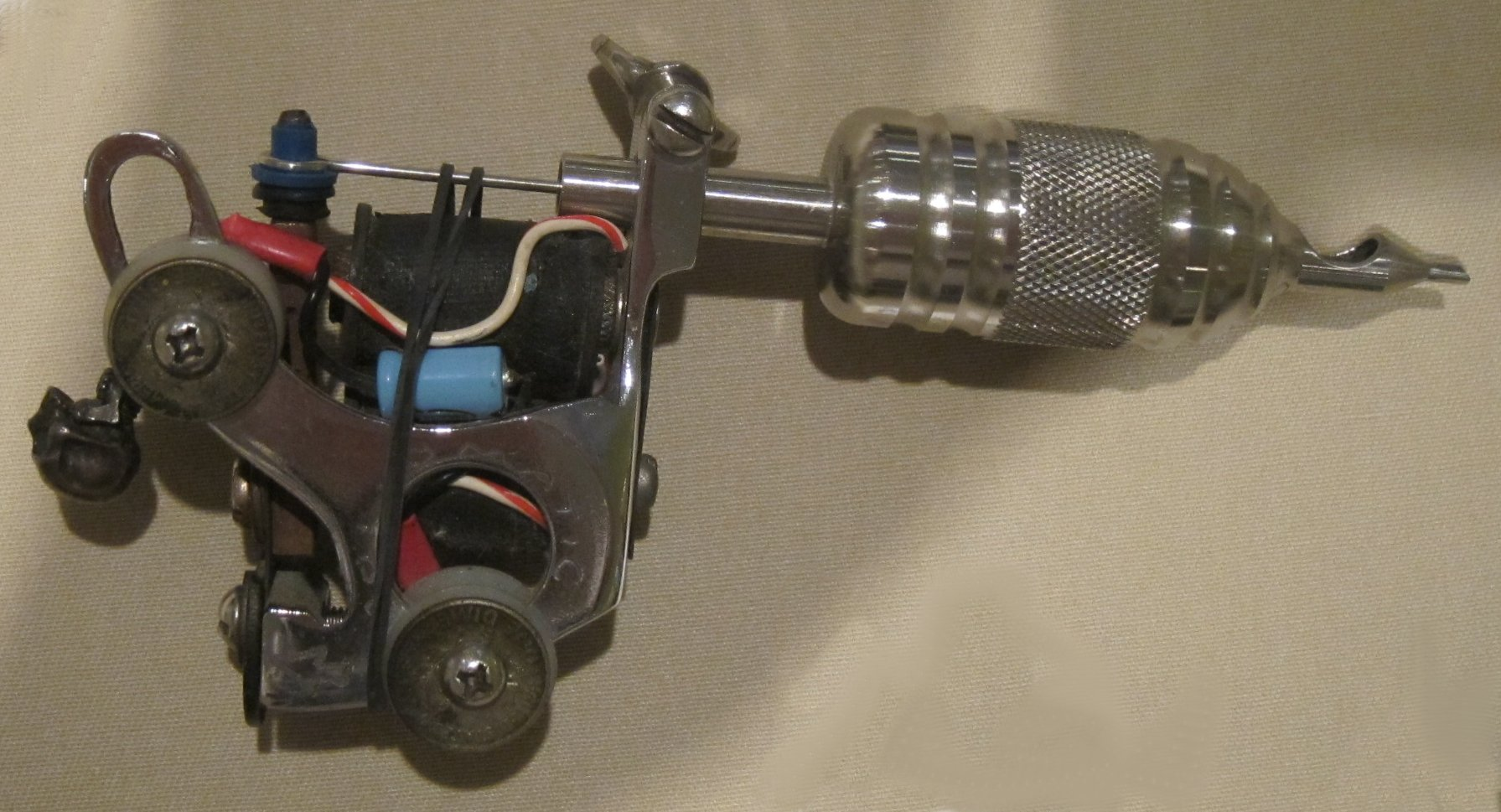
"Rollomatic" tattoo machine used for lining

Most professional tattoo artists use electric tattoo machines, first developed in the 1890s, although some artists specialize in "stick-and-poke" methods that derive from traditional tattooing practices.

There are a range of tattoo machine types and styles, including coil machines and newer pneumatic machines, mostly invented by tattoo artists. Tattoo artists often have multiple machines that they use for different purposes, such as lining and shading. Tattoo machine equipment also includes power supply, clip cord, foot pedal, grip, tips, and grip stem.

A practitioner may use many different needle sets with their machines, such as round liner needles, round shader needles, flat shaders, and magnum (mag) needles. The number of needles attached to the needle bar change, as well. For instance, magnum needle groups range from 5 to 55 needles on one bar.

Tattoo artists use tattoo ink that is specially formulated in a range of colors.

In the UK equipment must only be sold to registered studios who are provided a certificate by their local environmental health department.

== Tattoo studio ==
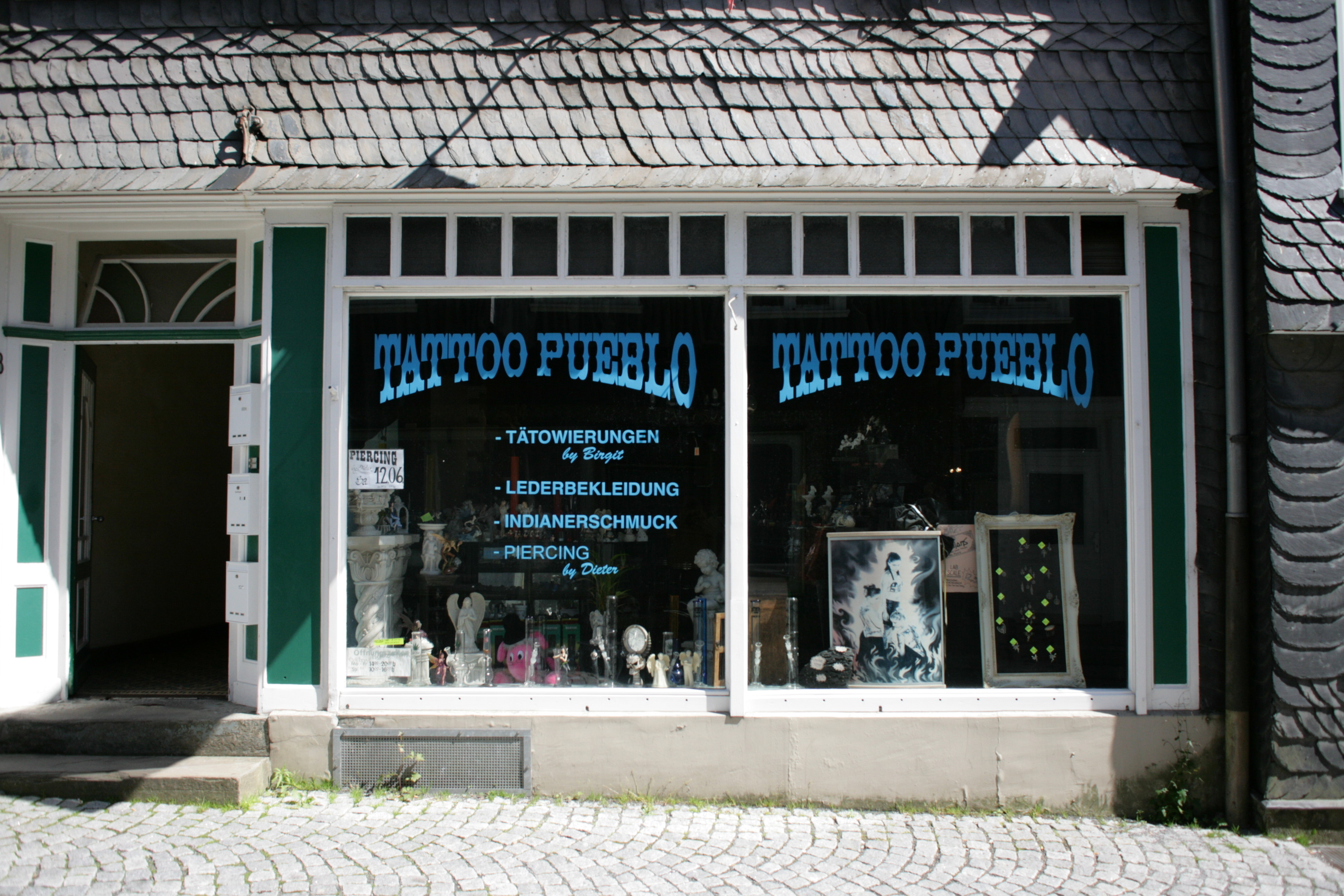
Tattoo studio in Hückeswagen, Germany

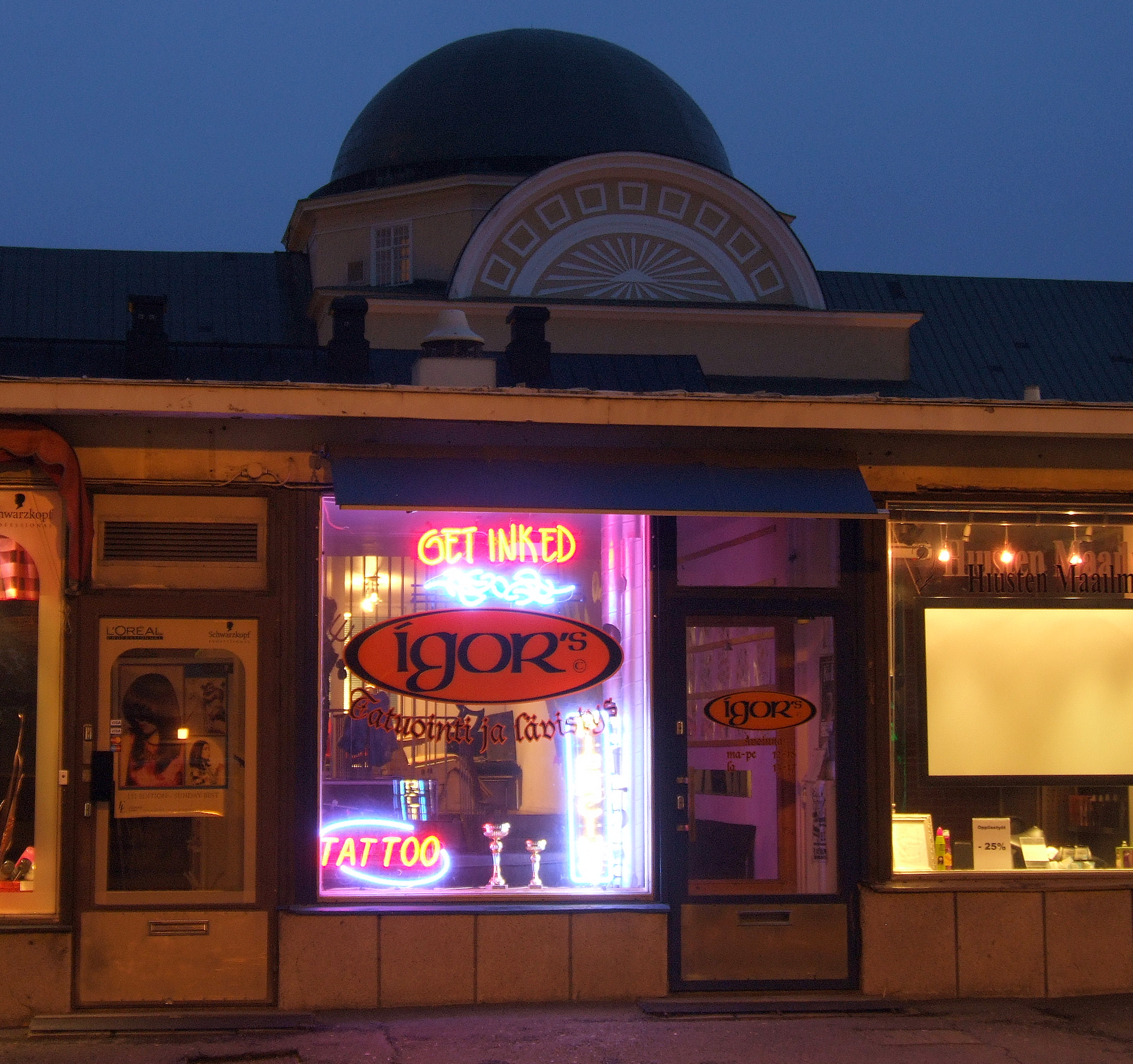
Tattoo studio in Oulu, Finland

The properly equipped tattoo studio will use biohazard containers for objects that have come into contact with blood or bodily fluids, sharps containers for old needles, and an autoclave for sterilizing tools. Certain jurisdictions also require studios by law to have a sink in the work area supplied with both hot and cold water.

Proper hygiene requires a body modification artist to wash his or her hands before starting to prepare a client for the stencil, between clients, after a tattoo has been completed, and at any other time where cross contamination can occur. The use of single use disposable gloves is also mandatory. In some countries and U.S. states it is illegal to tattoo a minor even with parental consent, and it is usually not allowed to tattoo impaired persons (e.g. someone intoxicated or under the influence of drugs), people with contraindicated skin conditions, those who are pregnant or nursing, or those incapable of consent due to mental incapacity. Before the tattooing begins the client is asked to approve the position of the applied stencil. After approval is given the artist will open new, sterile needle packages in front of the client, and always use new, sterile or sterile disposable instruments and supplies, and fresh ink for each session (loaded into disposable ink caps which are discarded after each client). Also, all areas which may be touched with contaminated gloves will be wrapped in clear plastic to prevent cross-contamination. Equipment that cannot be autoclaved (such as countertops, machines, and furniture) will be cleaned with a low level disinfectant and then wiped with an approved high level disinfectant.

The local health department can/will do a hands on inspection of tattoo studios every four months in the state of Tennessee. The venue will be graded based on the areas being inspected. If the studio passes an inspection, the health department will sign off on a passing scorecard and the studio will be required to show their score publicly. If the studio fails an inspection, they will be given the opportunity to correct the mistakes (if minor) or be fined (major health risks) and can also be placed out of business on the spot.

Also, the possession of a working autoclave is mandatory in most states. An autoclave is a medical sterilization device used to sterilize stainless steel. The autoclave itself will be inspected by the health department and required to submit weekly spore tests. However, if these jurisdictions are up to date, they will not require an autoclave if the practitioners are using 100% disposable tubes and grips which are made of plastic and some grips are made of rubber. These come pre-sterilized for one time use.

Membership in professional organizations, or certificates of appreciation/achievement, generally helps artists to be aware of the latest trends. However, many of the most notable tattooists do not belong to any association. While specific requirements to become a tattooist vary between jurisdictions, many mandate only formal training in blood-borne pathogens, and cross contamination. The local department of health regulates tattoo studios in many jurisdictions. For example, according to the health departments in Oregon and Hawaii, tattoo artists in these states are required to take and pass a test ascertaining their knowledge of health and safety precautions, as well as the current state regulations. Performing a tattoo in Oregon state without a proper and current license or in an unlicensed facility is considered a felony offense.

== Representation in popular culture ==
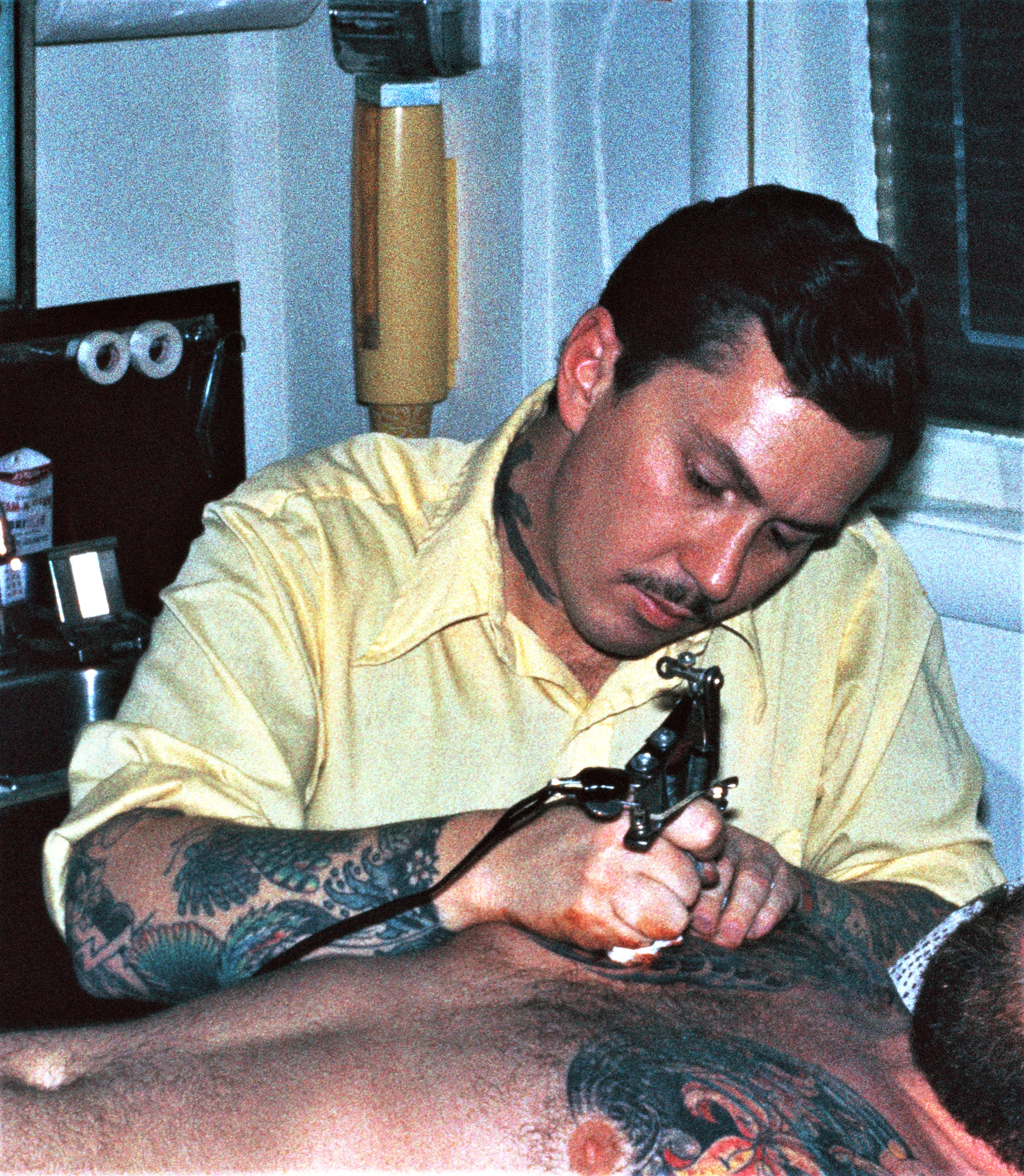
Don Ed Hardy in 1980

Even though the practice of tattooing dates back thousands of years, in the 90s there was a social stigma around tattooing and their practitioners. Many tattoo artists as well as people that had tattoos were perceived as social outsiders.

In recent years media coverage on [TV] and [social media] have transformed how modern society feels about tattooing and tattoo artists. Reality TV shows such as Ink Master, Miami Ink and LA Ink created a "hype" around the subject of tattooing which ultimately educated the public on the art of tattooing in detail. These events did not only make tattoos socially acceptable but created a "trend" and "catapulted" tattoos into popular culture. Nowadays, in the United States alone, more than a quarter of the population has at least one tattoo, in other countries that number reaches even higher.

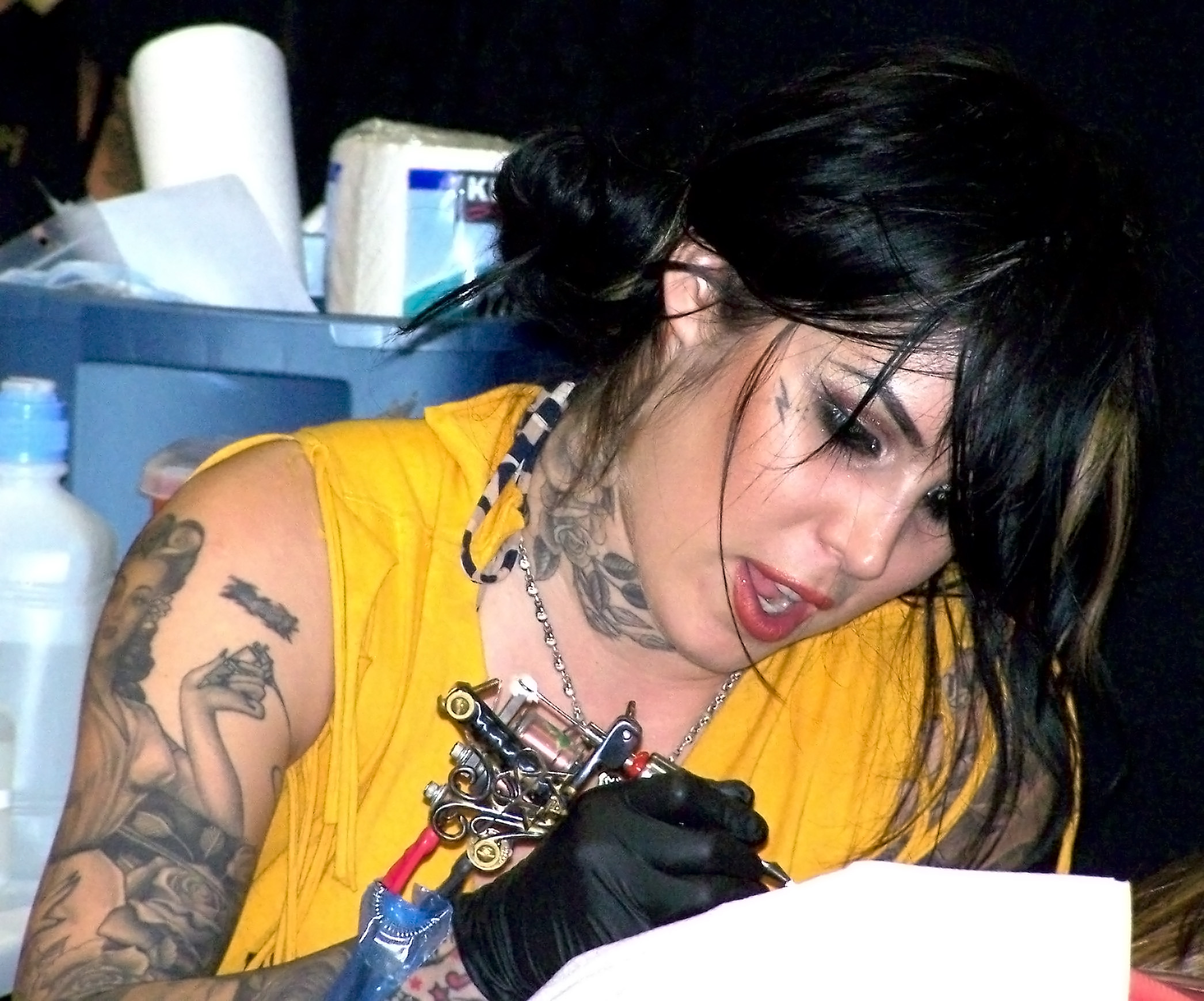
Kat Von D in 2007

As the popularity of reality TV shows grew, so did the idolization of the tattoo artists these shows featured. Artists like Kat Von D and Ami James attained a celebrity status, which drove other media icons such as Rihanna and David Beckham to get tattooed by them.

Tattoo artists also gained great popularity due to social media. Today, most tattoo artists display their art on social media platforms such as Instagram, Facebook, and Pinterest. Many tattoo artists have gained thousands of followers, admirers, and clientele through these platforms.

Contemporary minimalist and geometric tattoo artists such as Chaim Machlev (DotsToLines) have gained international recognition for large-scale line-based works created freehand to follow the body's structure.

== "Scratchers" ==
People who tattoo without proper training in the art of tattooing are commonly known as "scratchers". Scratchers often operate from home, but may also operate from an unlicensed studio. In addition, scratchers may offer reduced rates to attract customers away from professional tattoo shops. In the US, practicing without a license is a criminal offense in many states.

The practice of tattooing without proper training also carries serious health risks. Studies have shown that there is a significant risk of contracting Hepatitis C when tattoos are carried out using cheap, non-sterilized tattooing equipment. These risks are found to be higher on unregulated premises.

In the UK, Plymouth City Council launched a campaign in 2014 to crack down on scratchers operating within the city "in an attempt to reduce infection and injury through better awareness and training around infection control".

== See also ==
- List of tattoo artists
- Tattoo convention
