= Amundson =

Amundson is a Swedish patronymic surname meaning "son of Amund". Notable people with this surname include the following:

== People ==
- Karl Amundson (1873–1938), Swedish ballooner, military attaché and major general
- Kristen J. Amundson, American politician
- Lou Amundson, American basketball player
- Monti Amundson, American guitarist
- Neal Amundson, American chemical engineer and professor
- Norman E. Amundson, Canadian professor
- Robert Amundson (1938–2024), American judge

== See also ==
- Amundsen (surname)
