= Amundsen (disambiguation) =

Roald Amundsen was a Norwegian polar explorer.

Amundsen may also refer to:

- Amundsen (surname), people with the surname
  - Sophie Amundsen, a fictional character from the novel Sophie's World
  - Nautika Amundsen, a fictional character from the mobile game Reverse: 1999
- Amundsen (crater), a large crater on the Moon
- Amundsen (film), a 2019 Norwegian film about Roald Amundsen
- CCGS Amundsen, a Canadian Coast Guard icebreaker and Arctic research ship
- Amundsen High School, in Chicago, Illinois
- Amundsen, one of two probes on the NASA Deep Space 2 mission

== See also ==
- List of things named after Roald Amundsen
- Amundsen–Scott South Pole Station
- Amundson (disambiguation)
