= Amund =

- Gender: Male
- Language: Old Norse

Origin
- Meaning: Respectful protector

Other names
- See also: Åmund, Aamund, Ommund, Ogmund, Agmund

Amund (Old Norse: Agmundr), is a Norse masculine given name. It derives from the Old Norse Agmundr, meaning respectful protector.

Notable people with the name include:

- Amund B. Larsen (1849–1928), Norwegian linguist
- Amund Dietzel (1891–1974), Norwegian-American tattoo artist
- Amund Helland (1846–1918), Norwegian geologist, politician and non-fiction writer
- Amund Grøndahl Jansen (born 1994), Norwegian cyclist
- Amund Rydland (1888–1967), Norwegian actor and theatre director
- Amund Rasmussen Skarholt (1892–1956), Norwegian politician
- Amund Sjøbrend (born 1952), Norwegian speed skater
- Amund Skiri (born 1978), Norwegian footballer
- Amund Svensson (born 1978), Norwegian guitarist, The Kovenant
- Lars Amund Vaage (born 1952), Norwegian author and playwright
- Master Amund (Mäster Amund), Swedish 15th-century painter known for his paintings in Södra Råda Old Church

== See also ==
- Aamund
- Amundson
- Olukayode Oladipo Amund, a Nigerian academic administrator
- Amund, Iowa, an unincorporated community, United States
- Amund Ringnes Island, one of the Sverdrup Islands in Nunavut, Canada
