= Anundsen =

Anundsen is a surname. Notable people with the surname include:

- Anders Anundsen (born 1975), Norwegian politician
- Brynild Anundsen (1844–1913), Norwegian-American newspaper editor and publisher
- Sara Anundsen (born 1985), American tennis player

== See also ==
- Amundsen (surname)
