= American traditional =

Tattoo style

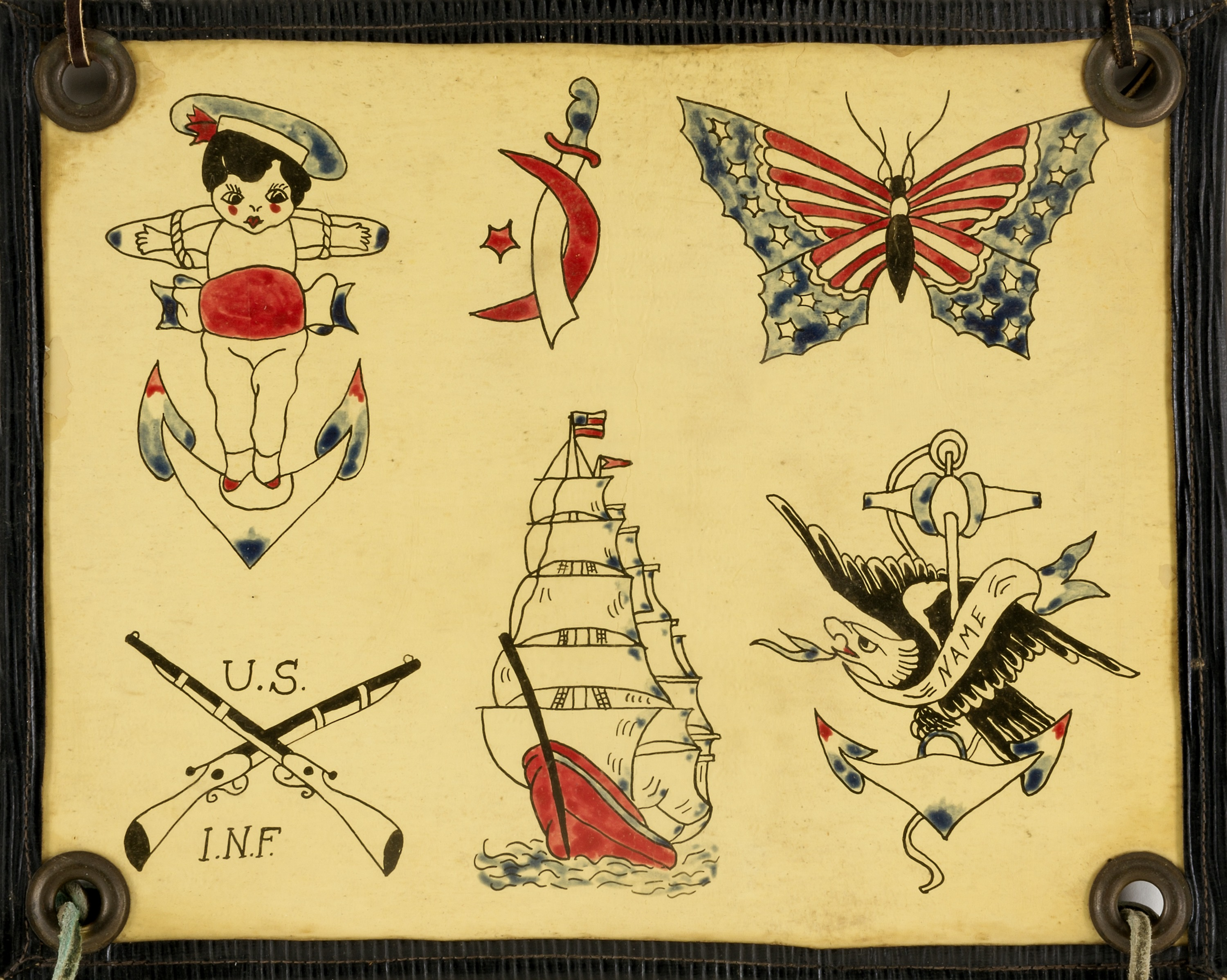
Naval-inspired flash, 20th century

American traditional, Western traditional or simply traditional is a tattoo style featuring bold black outlines and a limited color palette, with common motifs influenced by sailor tattoos. The style is sometimes called old school and contrasted with "new school" tattoos, which it influenced, and which use a wider range of colors, shading, and subjects.

Flash designs are often American traditional.

== Artists ==
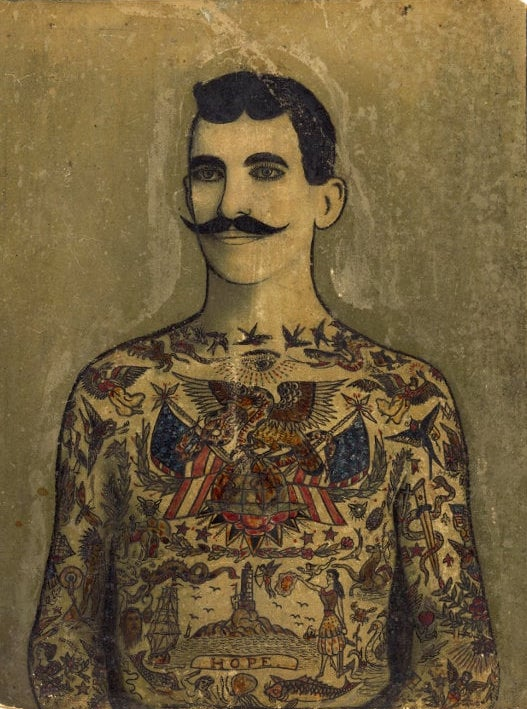
Self-portrait by tattoo artist Gus Wagner circa 1910-1930

- August "Cap" Coleman (1884–1973) had a significant influence on his generation of tattooists.
- Amund Dietzel (1890–1974), Norwegian-born artist who began his career as a sailor, before settling in the United States. Known as the "Master in Milwaukee".
- Milton Zeis (1901–1972), commercial artist and tattoo supplier who sold a large amount of flash.
- Franklin Paul Rogers (1905–1990), artist, mentor, and tattoo machine builder, contributed to the development of the American traditional style.
- Bert Grimm (1900–1985). Began his career in the city of St. Louis and then moved to Long Beach, California, to set up a shop at the Nu-Pike. His parlour was said to be the oldest continually running in the continental US and the place for sailors to get inked. Grimm sold the shop to Bob Shaw in 1970.
- Samuel Steward (1909–1993), one of the "old masters", best known for his memoir Bad Boys and Tough Tattoos, which continues to be used to teach apprentice tattoo artists.
- Tino "Rosie" Camanga (1900-?), moved to Honolulu from the Philippines and started tattooing there in 1944. He's a big influence in what is called folk art (sub-genre of the American traditional style).
- Norman Keith Collins (1911–1973), better known as Sailor Jerry, was one of the most well-known traditional tattoo artists.
- Herbert Hoffmann (1919–2010), began tattooing in Germany during the 1930s. Together with fellow artists Karlmann Richter and Albert Cornelissen, he was featured in the 2004 film Blue Skin (German: Flammend' Herz).
- Bob Shaw (1926–1993), American artist who learned tattooing from Bert Grimm in St. Louis. Later worked with Grimm and became the president of the National Tattoo Association from 1983–1988.
- Don Ed Hardy (born 1945), a driving force in incorporating Japanese tattoo aesthetics and techniques into American traditional.

== Common motifs and features ==
Patriotic flash circa 1940

Many old school motifs derive from tattoos popular among military service members during World War II, including patriotic symbols, such as eagles and American flags, along with pin-up girls.

American traditional tattoos are characterized by multiple features, including bright and saturated yellow, red, and green colors, as well as black shading. These primary colors are applied in a way such that they remain clear on the skin over a person's lifetime. In addition, American traditional tattoos use designs of recognizable shapes and objects, such as hearts and flowers.

Other old school tattoo designs include:

- Swallow (sometimes confused with sparrows and bluebirds)
- Heart
- Anchor
- Eagle
- Panther
- Snake
- Luck (black cats, 13, four-leaf clover, horseshoe, etc.)
- Navy and sailing symbols
- Dagger
- Rose
- Nautical star

As a result of these designs becoming increasingly popular and common, tattoo parlors would frequently prepare displays of these designs in front of their shops, and were referred to as flash tattoos.

== Examples ==
20th century flash in the collection of the Smithsonian American Art Museum:

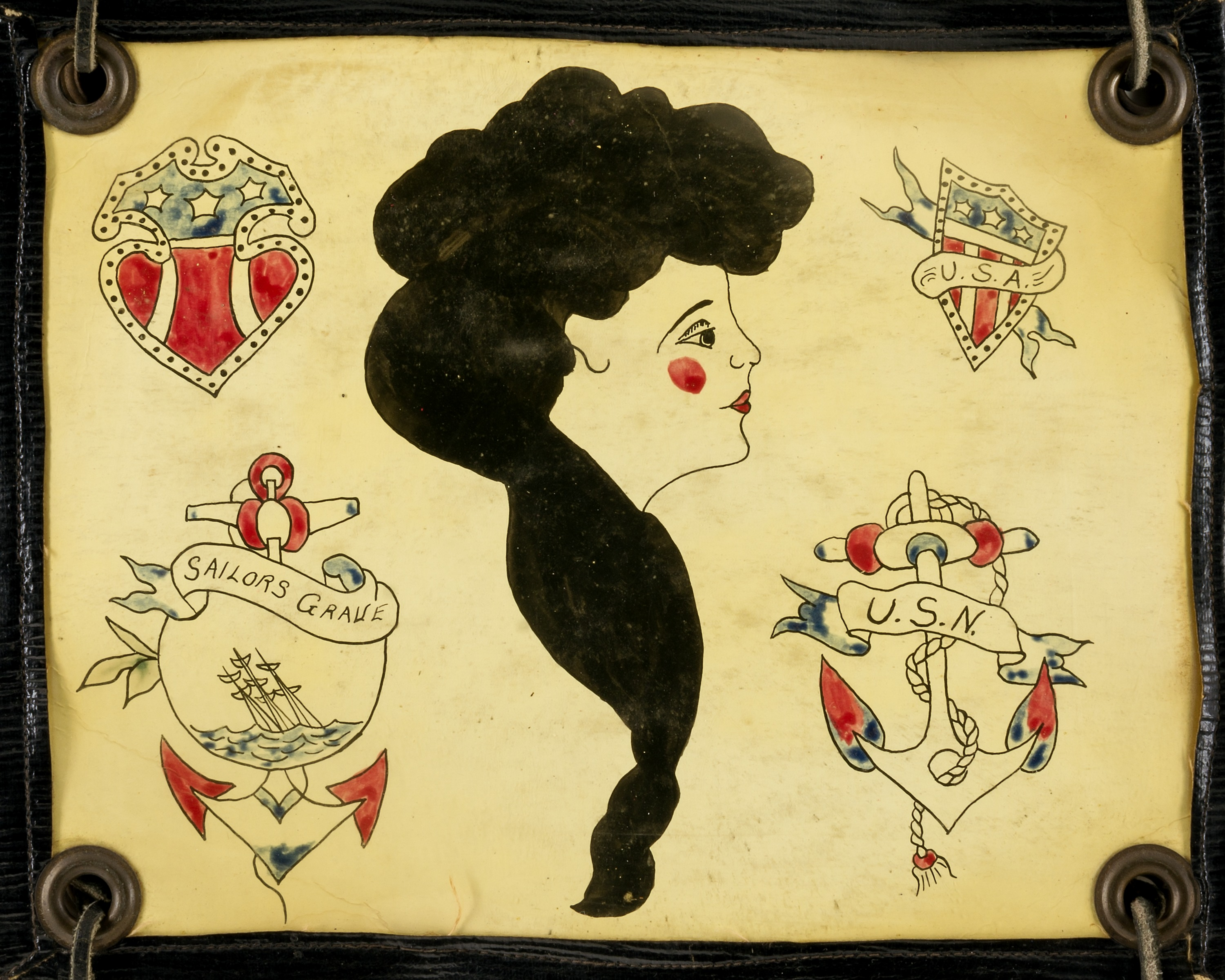
Lady head, "Sailor's Grave", U.S. Navy symbols

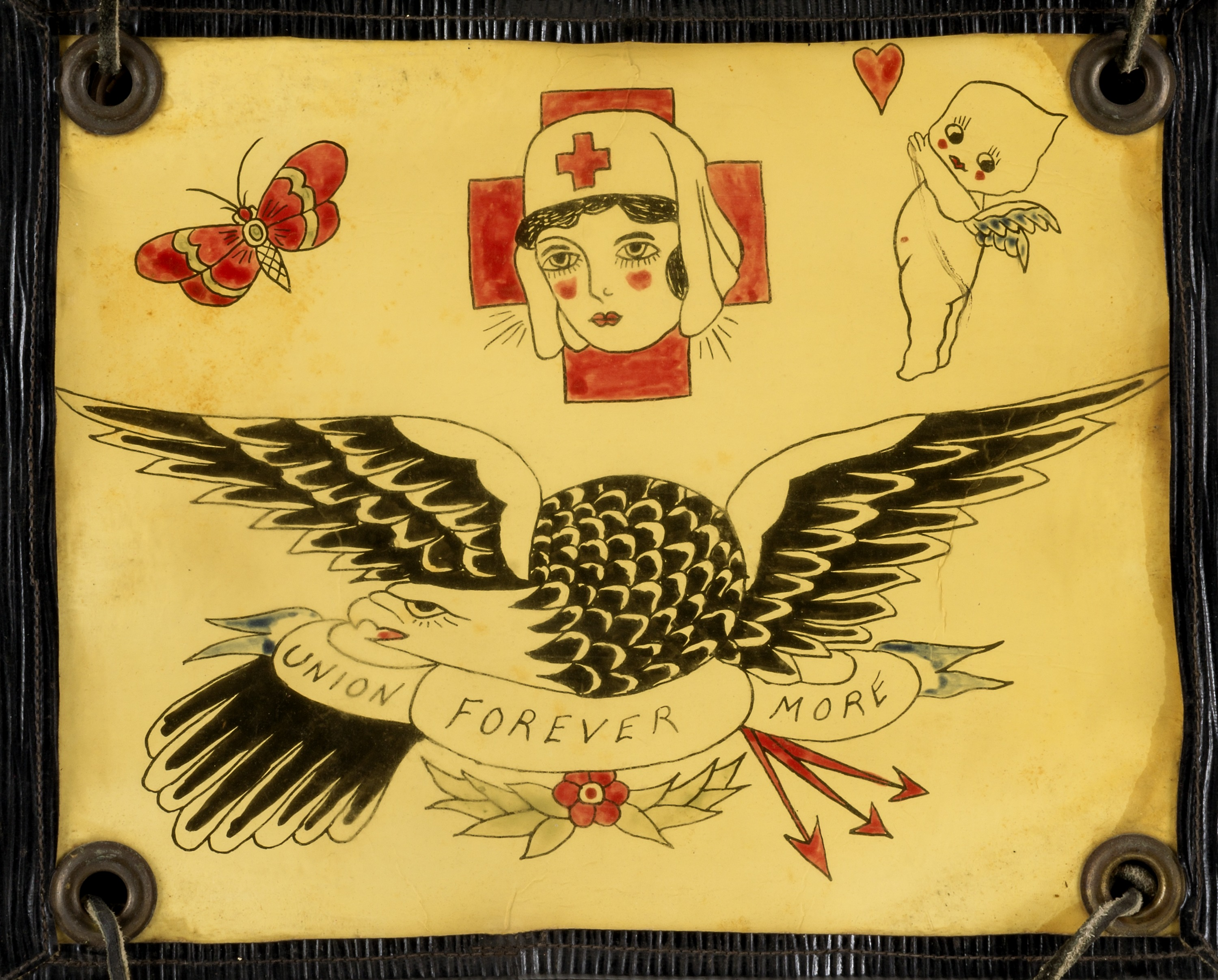
Nurse, "Union Forever More", Kewpie

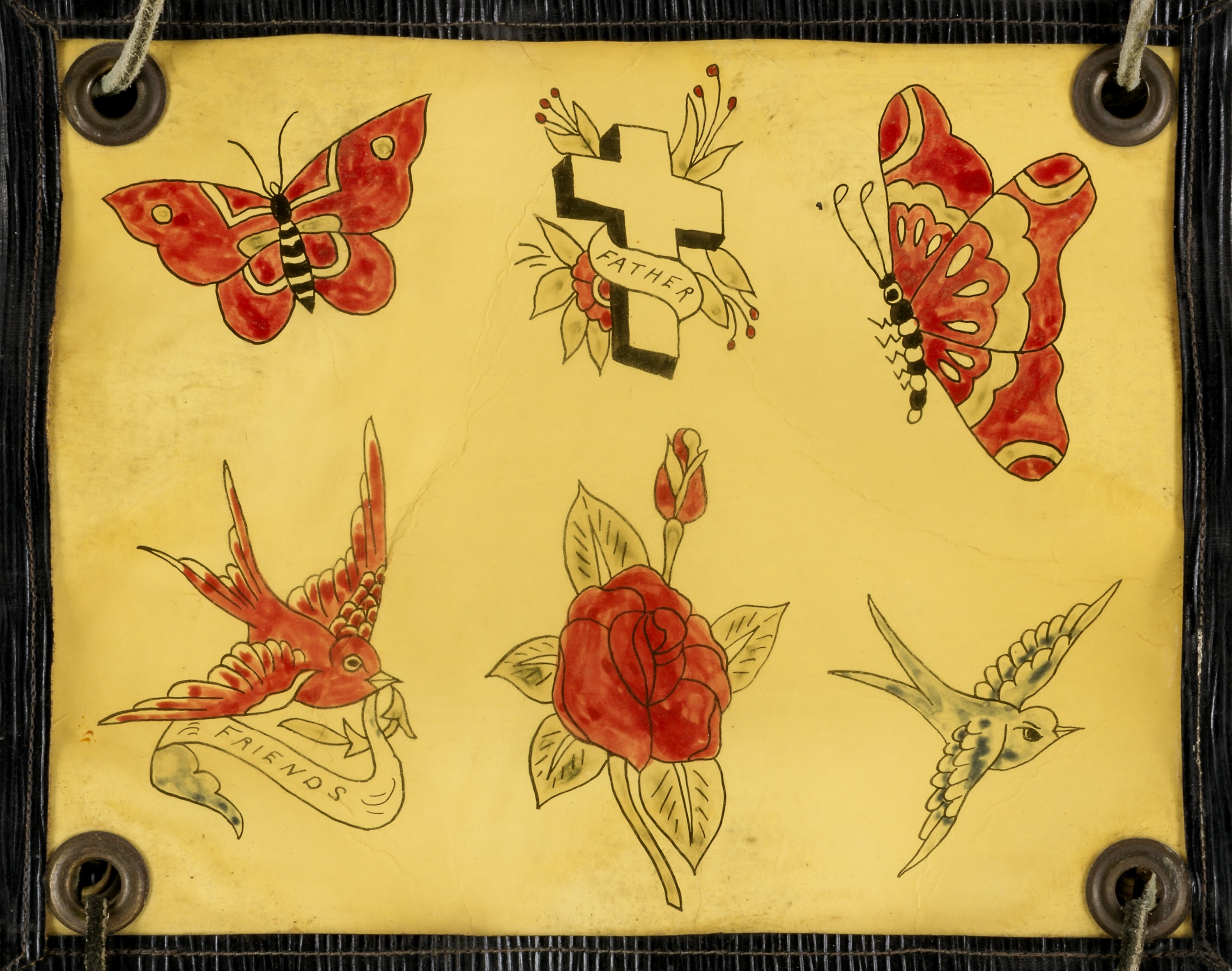
Butterflies, cross, birds, rose

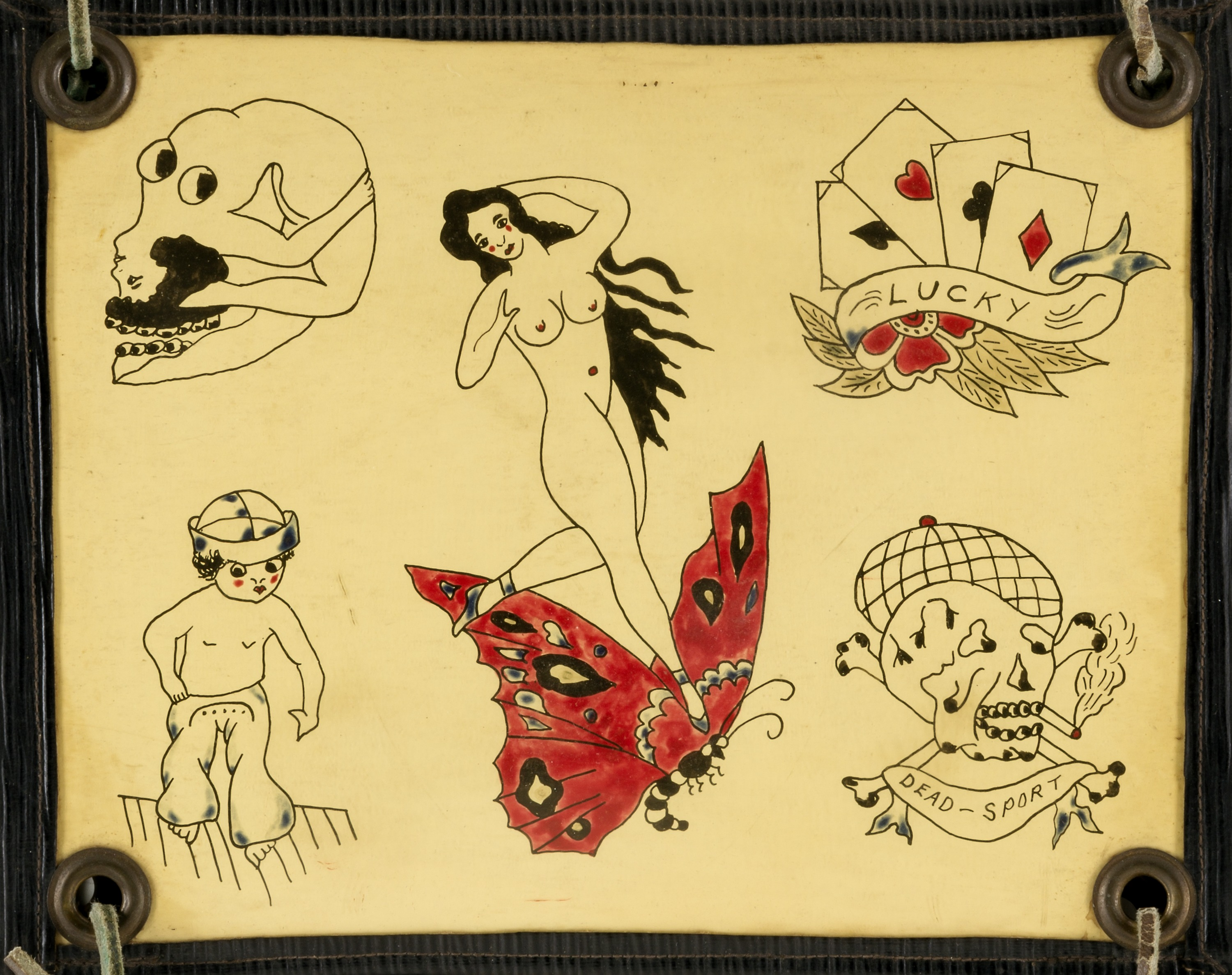
Woman, playing cards, skull

Sketchbook of designs circa 1900–1945 in the collection of the Metropolitan Museum of Art:

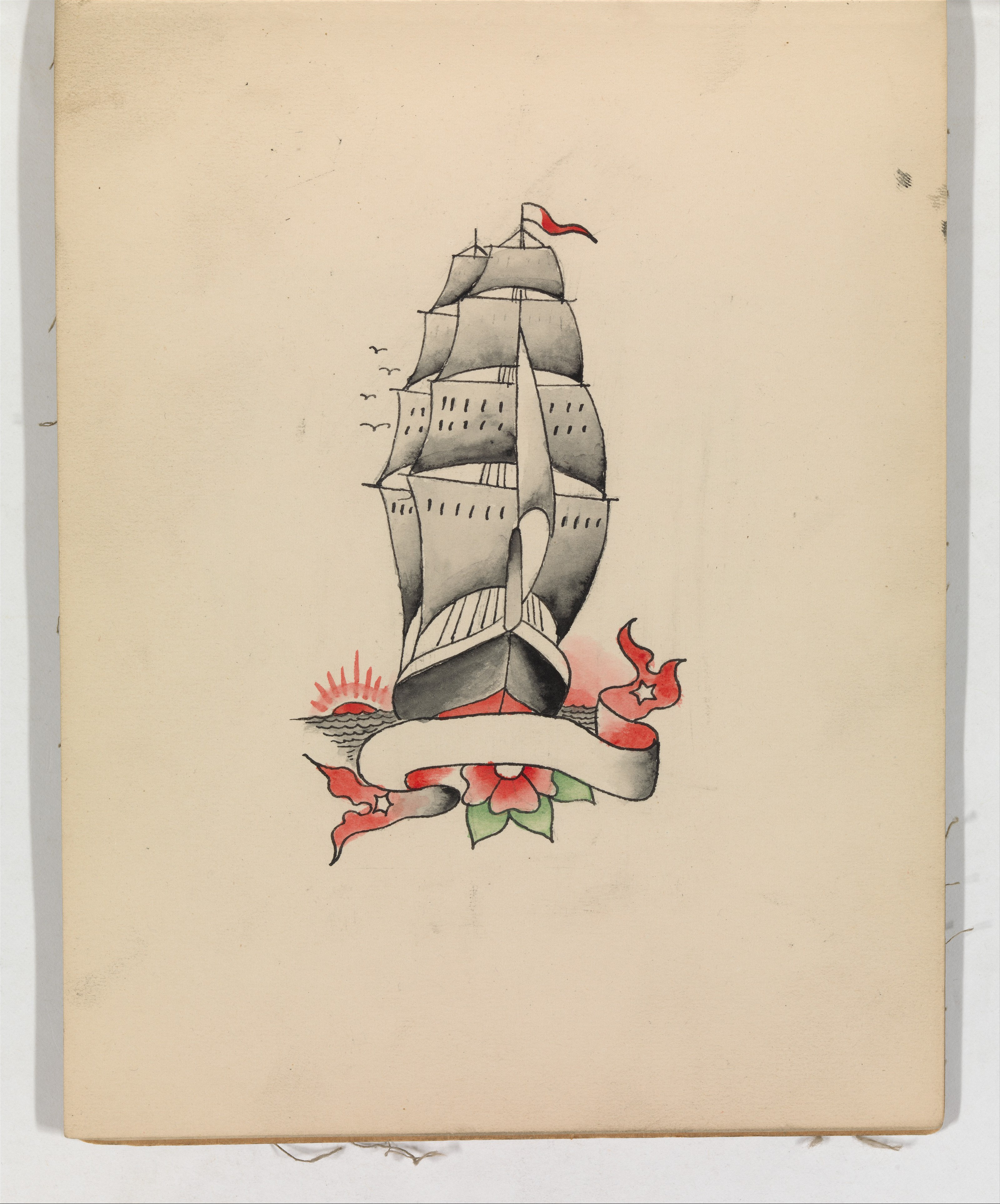
Ship

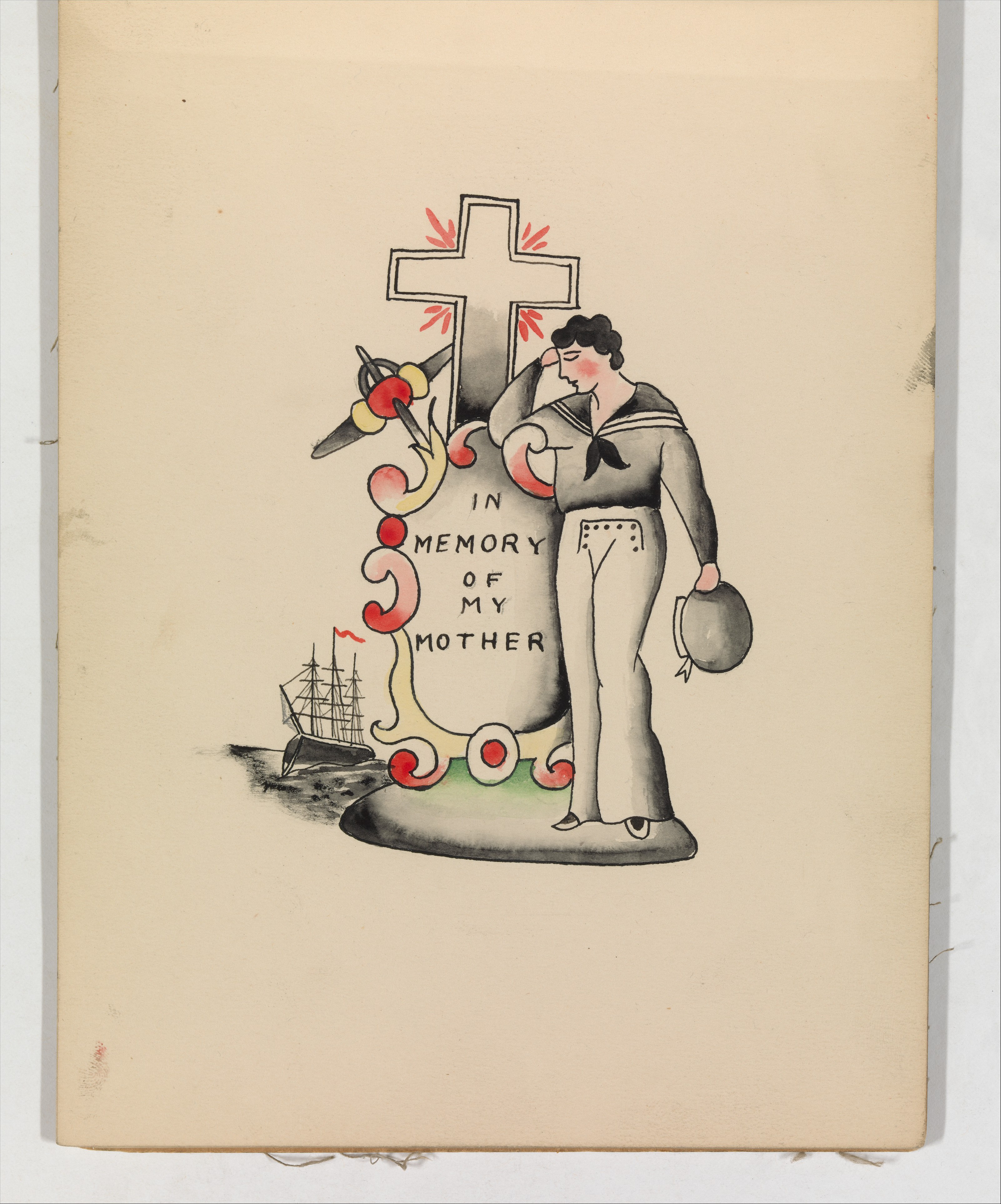
"In memory of my mother"

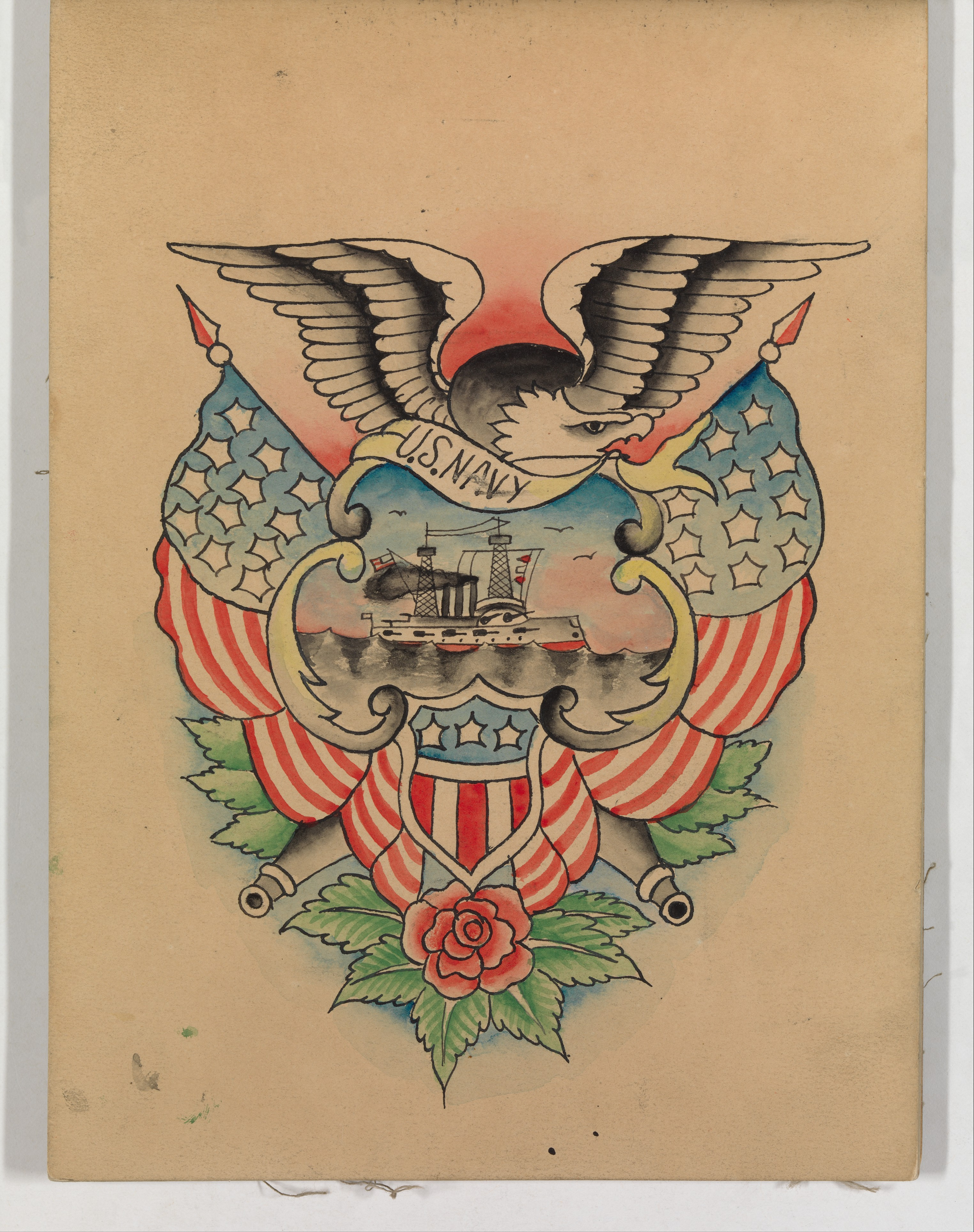
U.S. Navy motif

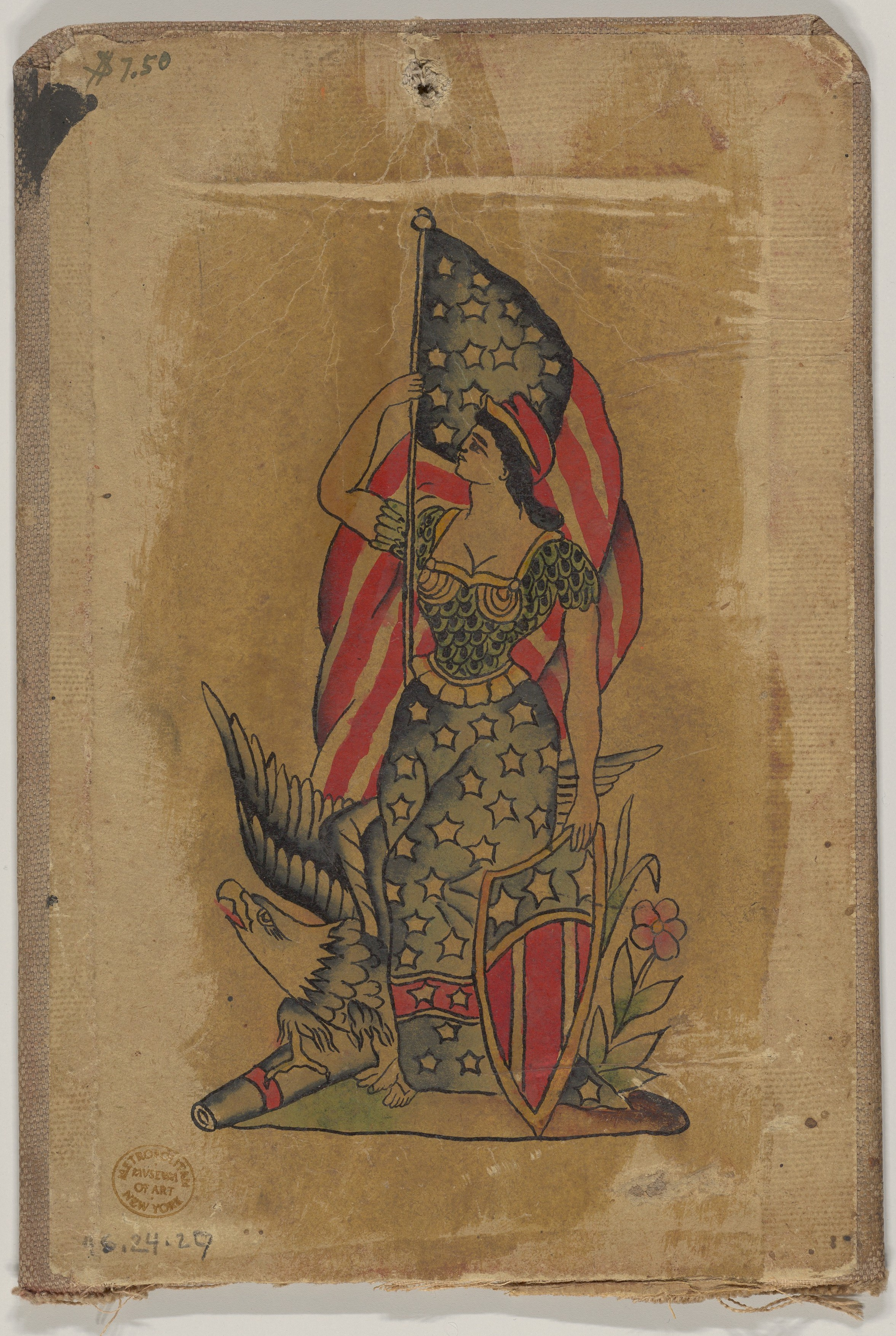
Lady Columbia

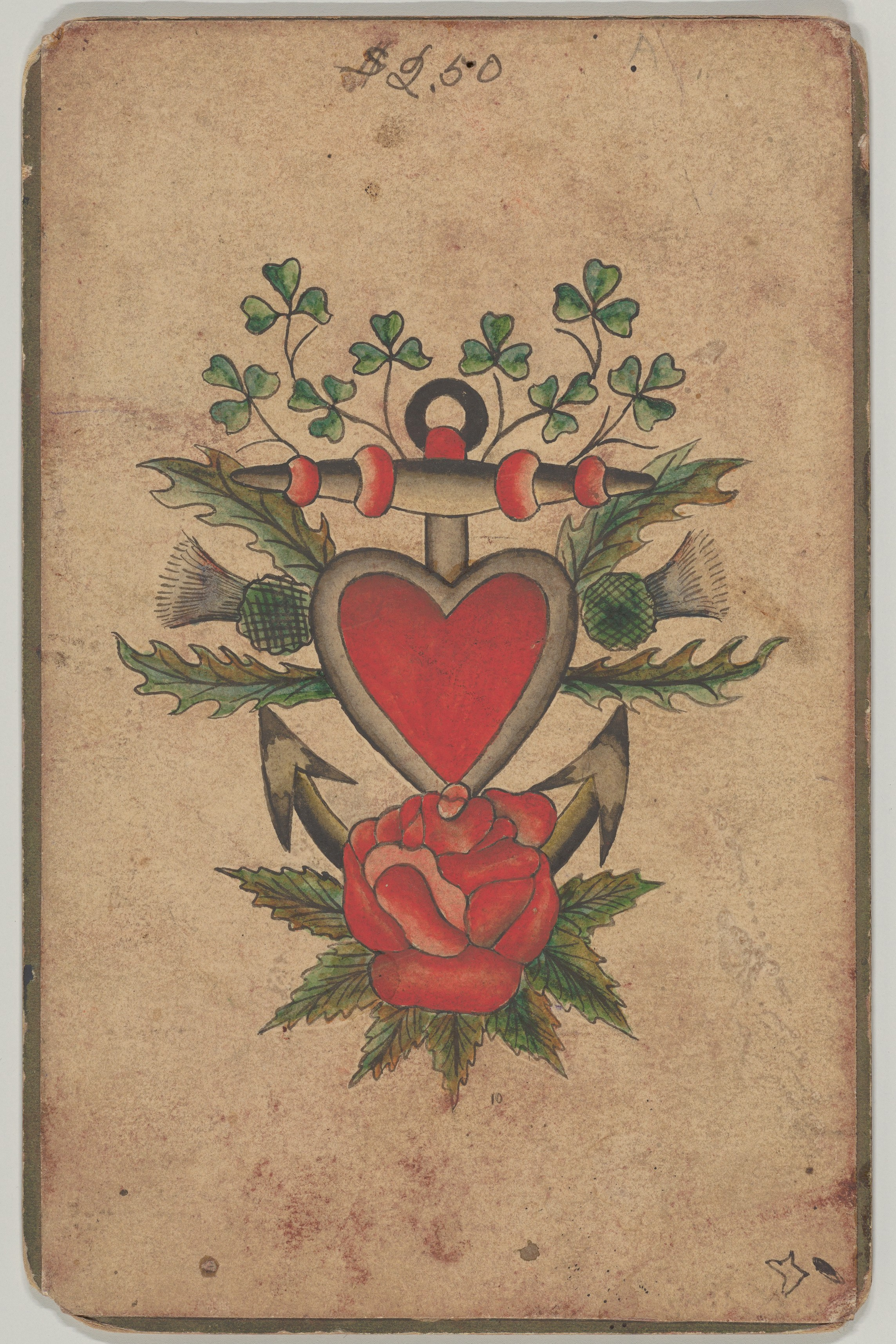
Anchor with heart, rose, shamrock, and thistle

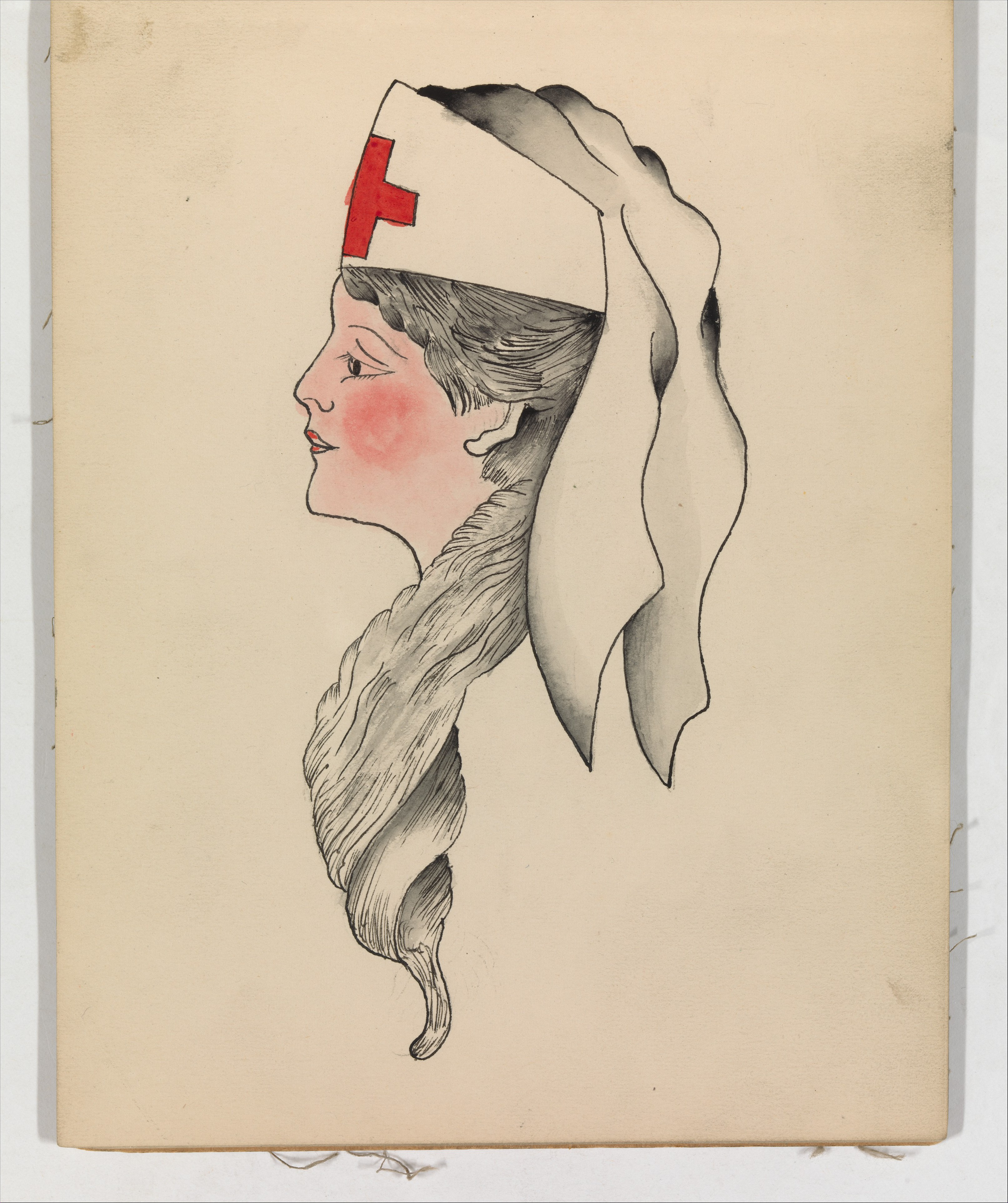
Army nurse

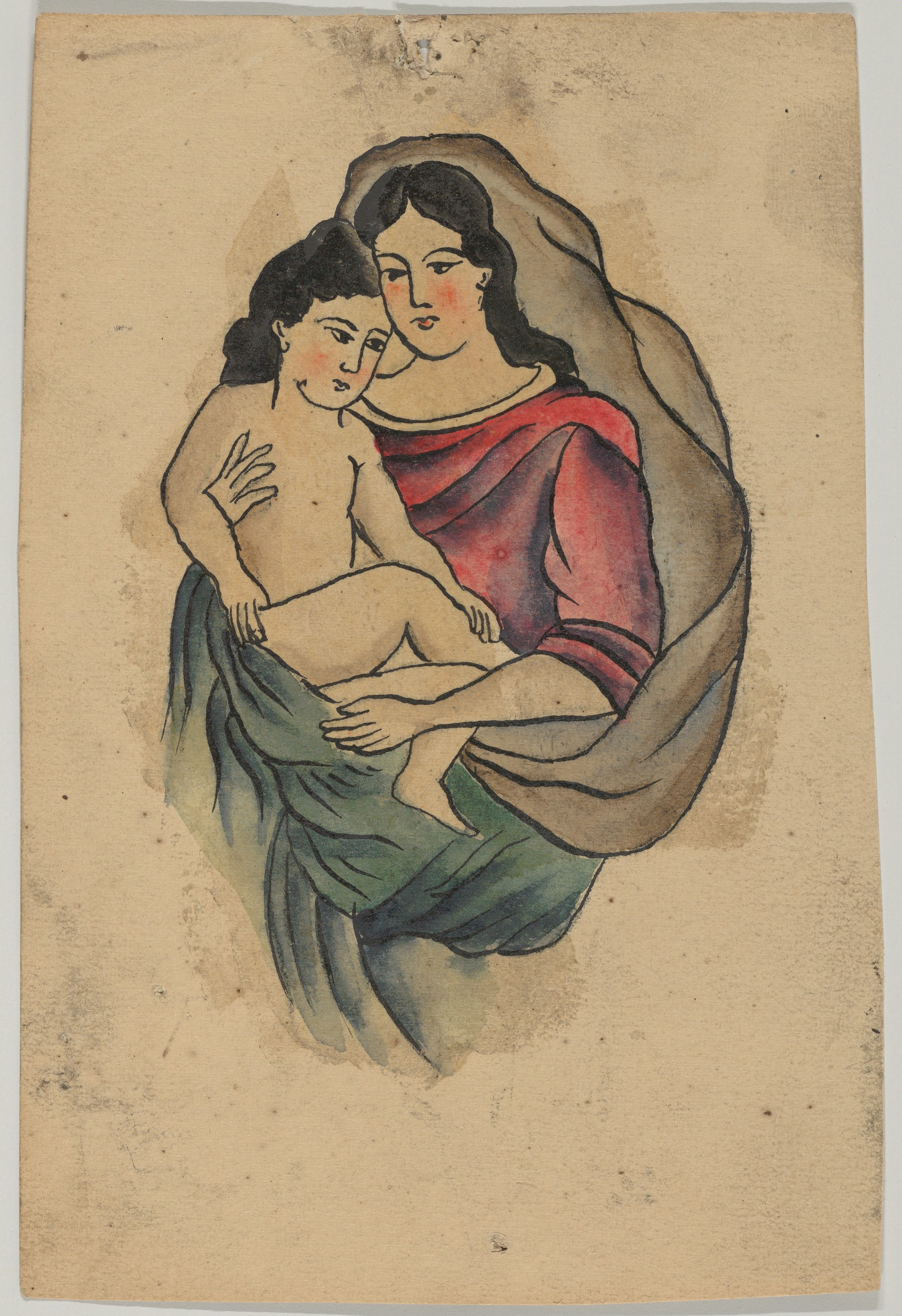
Madonna and child

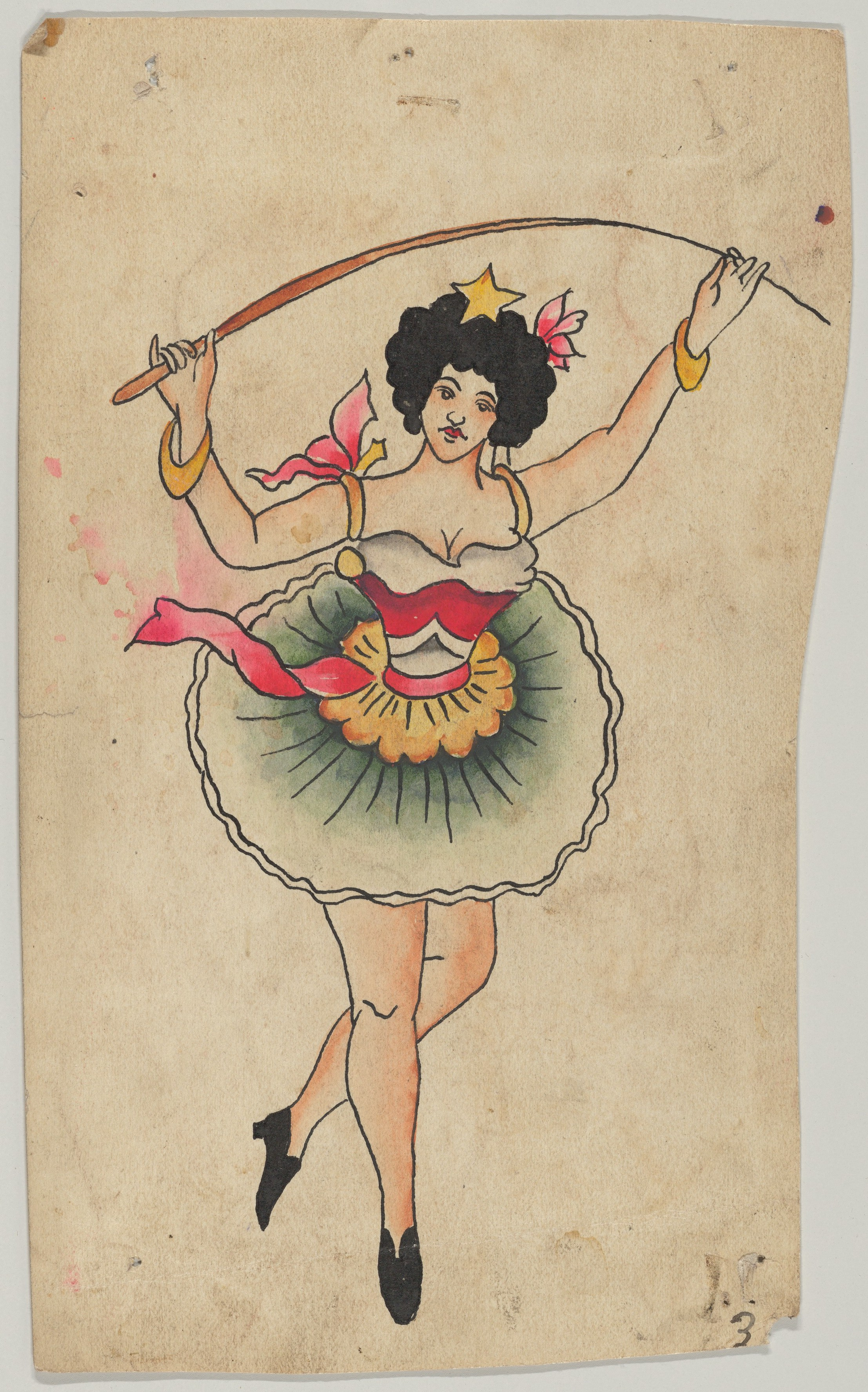
Tightrope walker

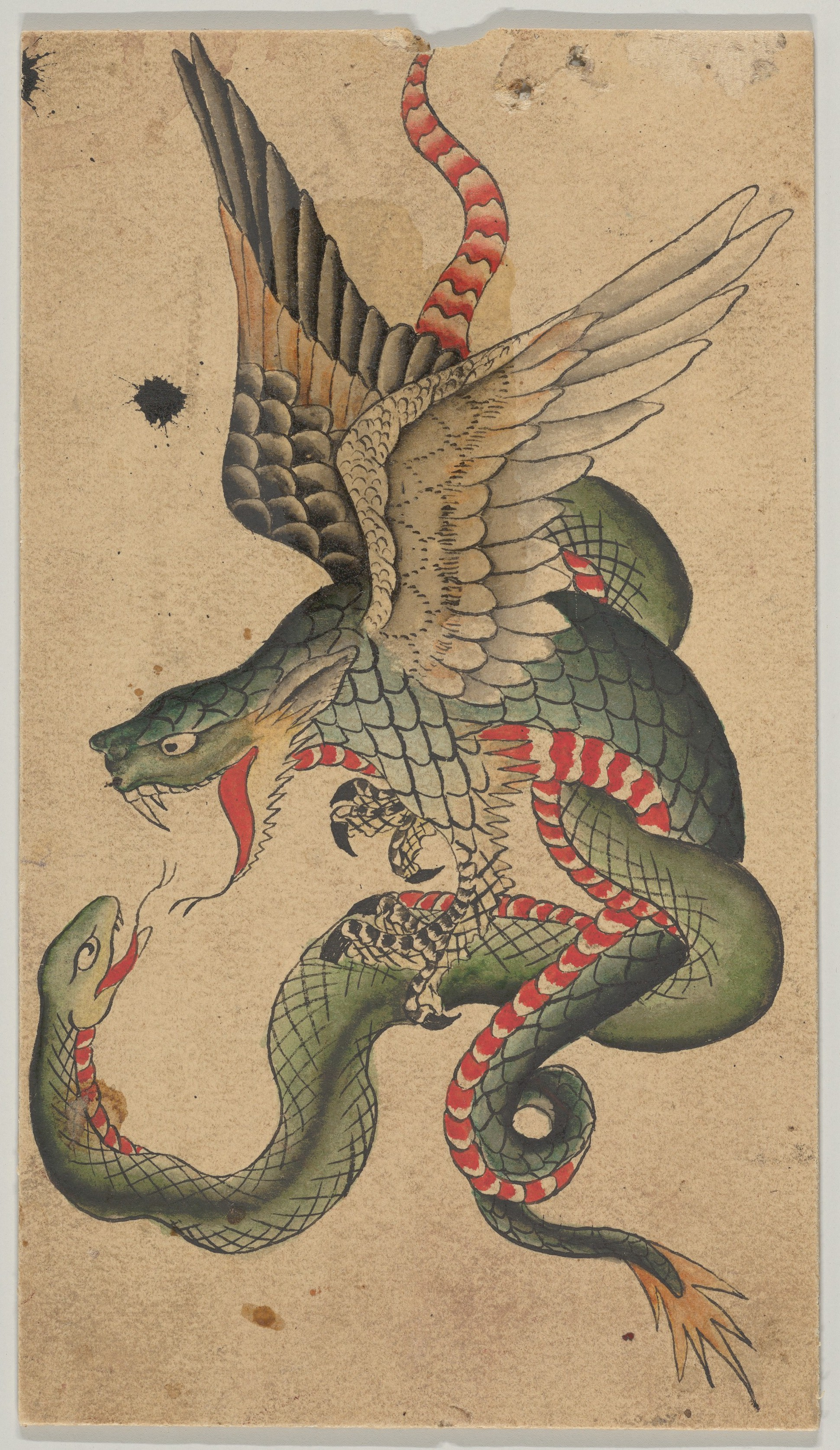
Dragon and snake

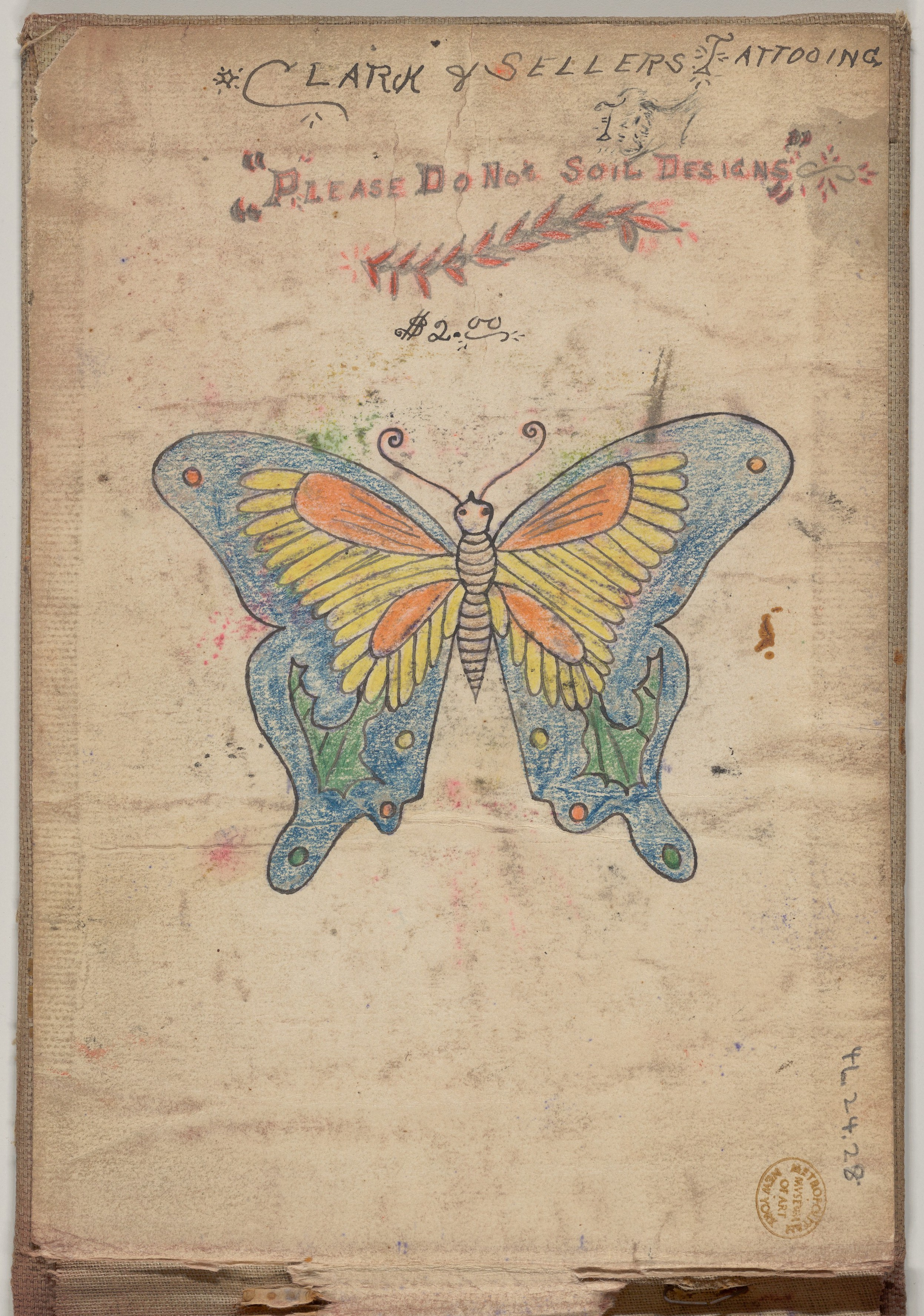
Butterfly
