= Flash art =

Flash art may refer to:

- Flash Art
- Flash (tattoo)
