= List of things named after Roald Amundsen =

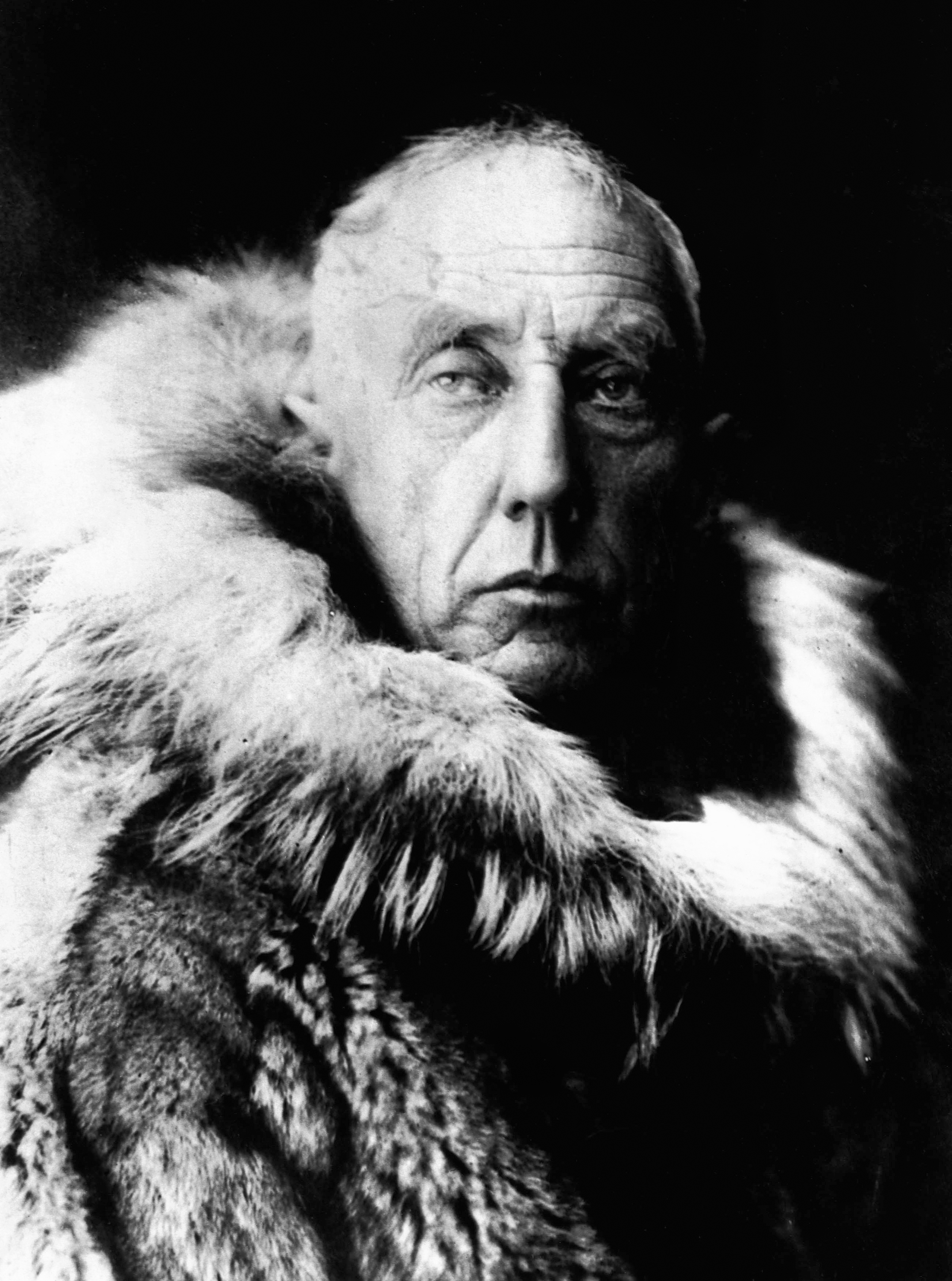
Roald Amundsen (1872–1928)

Roald Amundsen (1872–1928) was a Norwegian polar explorer who made a number of notable achievements during his lifetime, including leading the first expedition to the South Pole in 1911.

In recognition of Amundsen's accomplishments, a number of places in the Arctic and Antarctic have been named after him, as well as numerous entities in other fields.

== Places ==
=== Antarctic ===
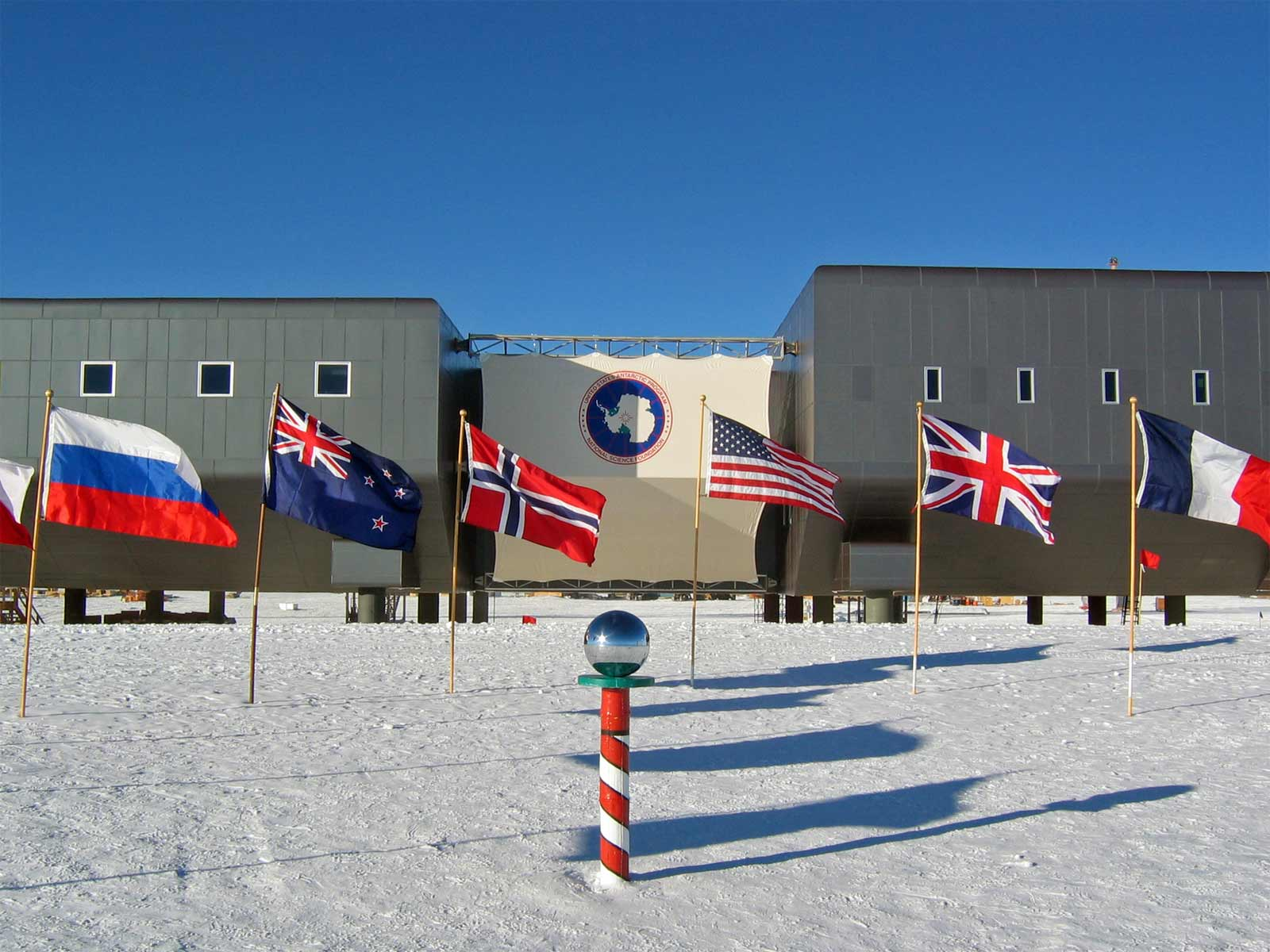
Amundsen–Scott South Pole Station

- Amundsen–Scott South Pole Station, jointly named with his rival Robert Falcon Scott
- Amundsen Sea, arm of the Southern Ocean
- Amundsen Plain, abyssal plain in the Southern Ocean
- Amundsen Bay
- Amundsen Coast
- Amundsen Glacier
- Amundsen Icefall
- Mount Amundsen

=== Arctic ===
- Amundsen-Nobile Climate Change Tower, research tower in Svalbard, jointly named with Umberto Nobile
- Amundsen Basin, abyssal plain in the Arctic Ocean
- Amundsen Gulf, arm of the Arctic Ocean
- Amundsen Land, Greenland
- Roaldryggen, mountain ridge in Svalbard

=== Elsewhere ===
- Amundsen Circle, in Staten Island, New York
- Amundsena Street, in Moscow, Russia

== Extraterrestrial ==
- Amundsen, crater near the Moon's south pole
- 1065 Amundsenia, asteroid

== Ships ==
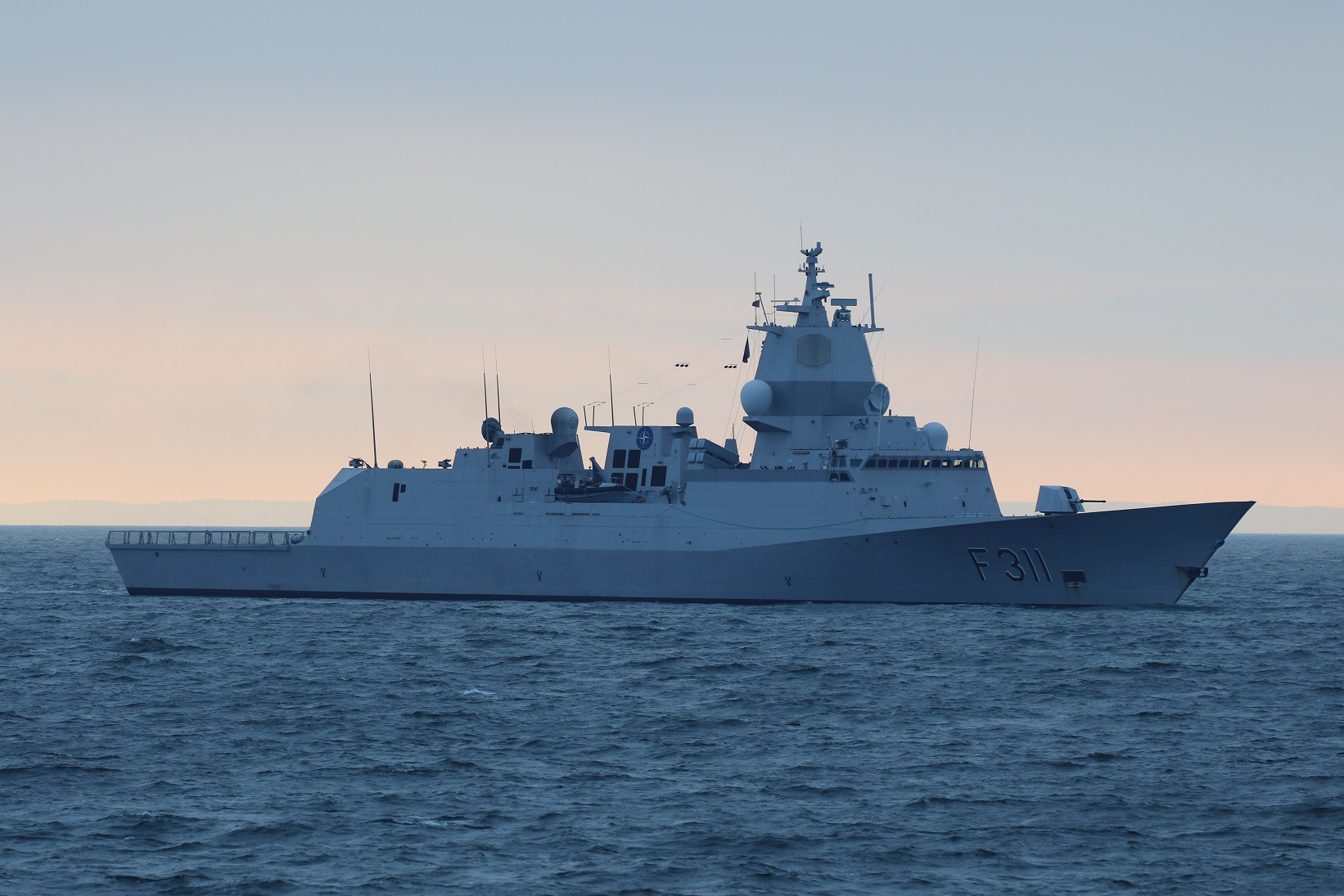
HNoMS Roald Amundsen

- HNoMS Roald Amundsen, frigate of the Royal Norwegian Navy
- CCGS Amundsen, icebreaker and Arctic research vessel of the Canadian Coast Guard
- MS Roald Amundsen, Norwegian cruise ship
- Roald Amundsen, German brig

== People ==
- Roald Dahl, British author
- Roald Hoffmann, American chemist and Nobel Prize laureate
- Roald Sagdeev, Russian physicist

== Other ==
- Roald Amundsen (PH-BTE), Boeing 737 of KLM
- Roald Amundsen (LN-LNE), Boeing 787 of Norwegian Long Haul
- Roald Amundsen, a private railway car built by the Pullman Company
- Amundsen, one of two probes on the Deep Space 2 mission
- Amundsen High School, in Chicago, Illinois
- Amundsen, 2019 biographical film about Amundsen's life
- Amundsenia which is a genus of saxicolous lichens in the family Teloschistaceae

== See also ==
- Amundsen (disambiguation)
