= New school (tattoo) =

Tattoo style

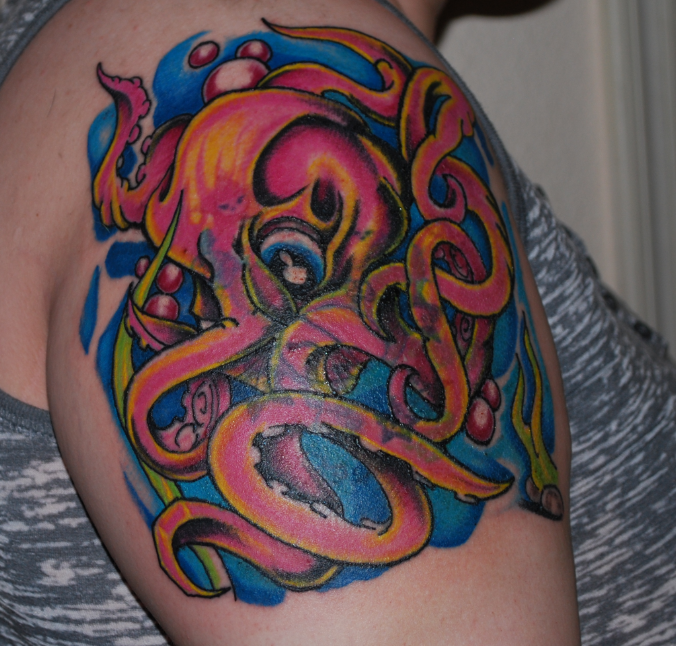
Arm tattoo of an octopus done in the new school style

New school is a style of tattoo characterized by heavy outlines, vivid colors, and exaggerated depictions of the subject. It originated as early as the 1970s and is influenced by some features of old school tattooing in the United States. New school also represents a transition towards openness in the sharing of techniques in tattooing.

== Origin ==
There are multiple accounts regarding how new school tattooing began. One scholar noted that California tattoo artists began experimenting with multiple design styles as early as the 1970s and included subject matter such as film actors, Disney characters, and Star Trek. The scholar argued during this time, new cultural designs came from the demands of customers, and less so from the inspiration of tattoo artists. Other accounts place the emergence of new school tattooing during the late 1980s and 1990s. Tattoo artist Marcus Pacheco is one artist recognized for popularizing new school tattooing early on.

== Characteristics ==
New school tattooing incorporates elements from many tattooing traditions including irezumi, old school, and folk art. It is similar to old school tattooing in that they both generally employ heavy outlines. In contrast to the restricted palette in old school, however, new school tattoos frequently use a range of bright colors. New school tattoos are not realistic in that they exaggerate details in the subject; they are sometimes compared to styles seen in cartooning, graffiti art, and themes seen in hip hop culture such as jagged edges and bubble letters.

New school tattoos are not restricted to traditional subjects such as hearts and eagles. They feature fantastical subjects, novel patterns, and generally allow for a great deal of customization. However, old school subjects are commonly done in a new school style as a way of expressing homage or irony.

== Changes in artist secrecy ==
New school reflects a transition in artists' attitudes towards sharing information on their work and techniques. The craft of old school tattoos was often protected by artists during the 1970s and 1980s for fear of losing business to competitors. However, this also meant that innovation was stifled in the tattooing community. New school artists were more open with this information and pushing the boundaries of tattooing, and explains why there is some tension between older and newer tattooers; regarding this transition, traditional tattooers remark that "tattooing has lost some of its charm," whereas newer tattooers consider this openness to be progressive.
