= Aamund =

Aamund is a Danish surname. Notable people with the surname include:

- Jane Aamund (1936–2019), Danish author and journalist
- Malou Aamund (born 1969), Danish politician and businesswoman, niece of Jane

== See also ==
- Amund
