= Amund Dietzel =

Norwegian-American tattoo artist (1891–1974)

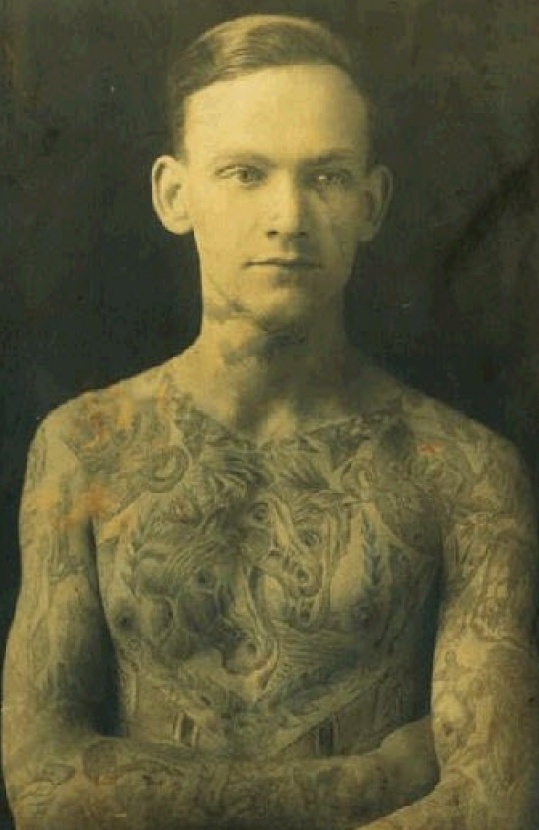
- Dietzel in 1914. His chest includes Pharaoh's Horses, a classic design inspired by a painting by John Frederick Herring Sr.
- Born: 28 February 1891; Kristiania, Norway
- Died: 9 February 1974 (aged 82); Oconomowoc, Wisconsin, U.S.
- Occupation: Tattoo artist

Amund Dietzel (28 February 1891 – 9 February 1974) was an early American tattoo artist who tattooed tens of thousands of people in Milwaukee, Wisconsin, between 1913 and 1967. He developed a substantial amount of flash art, influenced many other tattoo artists, and helped to define the American traditional tattoo style. He was known as the "Master of Milwaukee" and "Master in Milwaukee".

He learned to tattoo as a young Norwegian sailor, but after a shipwreck in Canada, he decided to immigrate to the United States. He became a traveling performer as a tattooed man, then settled in Milwaukee as a professional tattoo artist.

== Early life ==
Dietzel was born on 28 February 1891, in Kristiania, Norway. After his father died, Dietzel joined the Norwegian merchant fleet at the age of 14. Scandinavia had a maritime tattooing tradition, and Dietzel soon received his first tattoo. Dietzel may have been mentored by a Norwegian ship's carpenter and tattoo artist named Johan Fredrik Knudsen. While working on a ship that transported timber between Canada and England, he began to tattoo his shipmates using a needle tool that he made. In July 1907, when Dietzel was 16, his ship wrecked near Quebec, and he decided to work in the lumber yards there rather than return to sea.

== Career ==
=== Art school and traveling carnivals ===
After working in Quebec for two months, Dietzel hopped a train and moved to New Haven, Connecticut. In New Haven, he took some art classes at Yale University while working as a tattoo artist at night. He wanted to be a fine-art painter, but he could not afford to continue studying art at Yale, so he became a full-time tattoo artist instead. Around this time, he started using an electric tattoo machine. He made friends with William Grimshaw, an English immigrant who was also a developing tattoo artist. Grimshaw gave Dietzel a suit of tattoos, and Dietzel may have tattooed Grimshaw in return. Together, they performed in traveling carnivals and circus sideshows as tattooed men, where they sold photos of themselves and tattooed customers in between shows. Dietzel and Grimshaw used tattoo ink made with carbon black, "China red" (vermilion), "Casali's green" (viridian), Prussian blue, and a yellow pigment that may have been arylide yellow.

=== Milwaukee ===
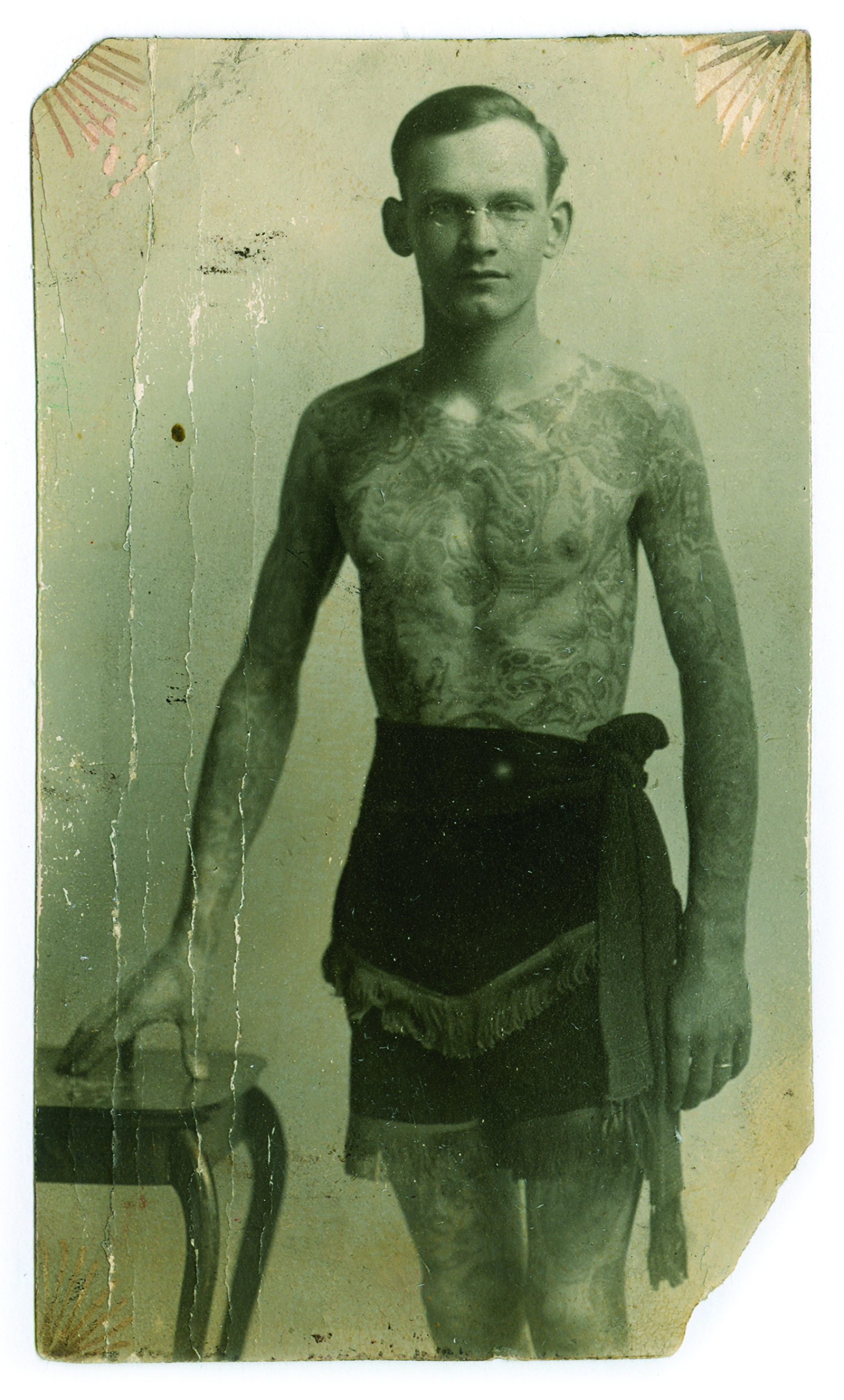
Dietzel in 1914

In 1913, Dietzel arrived in Milwaukee and found that nobody was tattooing there. He decided to stay and set up shop in an arcade. His business occupied various downtown locations over the years, and he sometimes shared space with a sign painter. Dietzel was known to wear formal clothes at work, such as a vest and tie with rolled-up shirtsleeves, and even sleeve garters. Many of his customers were soldiers and sailors who served in World War I and World War II. By 1949, business had declined, so he also worked as a sign painter.

In the early 1950s, most of his customers were sailors on leave from Naval Station Great Lakes. He said that the Navy was discouraging tattoos of naked women, so he was often asked to add clothes to existing tattoos. His designs at that time included a full-rigged sailing ship labeled "Homeward Bound", a woman wearing a sailor cap, dragons, peacocks, mermaids, and skull and crossbones. In the mid-1950s, he said that he had tattooed more than 20,000 customers.

He became known as the region's leading tattoo artist. Many tattoo artists came to Milwaukee to get tattooed by Dietzel and to learn from his techniques, including Samuel Steward. He developed a large quantity of flash art — at one point, he said that he had developed more than 5,000 designs — and contributed to the development of the American traditional tattoo style. He was called the "Master in Milwaukee", "Master of Milwaukee", and "Rembrandt of the rind".

Dietzel also painted landscapes and birds, and he took classes at Layton School of Art in Milwaukee.

=== End of career ===
In 1964, at age 73, Dietzel sold his shop to his friend and collaborator Gib "Tatts" Thomas. In February 1967, Thomas said that he and Dietzel had "covered more people for exhibition than any two people in the United States", but that few people wanted to become tattooed sideshow performers anymore; most of their recent customers were sailors or businessmen. Dietzel and Thomas continued to tattoo together until the Milwaukee city council banned tattooing on 1 July 1967.

== Personal life and death ==
Dietzel was married four times. In the 1940 census, he is listed as living in Wauwatosa, Wisconsin, with his wife and daughter.

Dietzel died of leukemia on 9 February 1974. The probate section of The Waukesha Freeman newspaper stated that he was from Oconomowoc, Wisconsin, and had left $28,725.02 (equivalent to $187,527 in 2025) to his heirs.

== Legacy ==
Samuel Steward, who had learned from Dietzel and kept some of Dietzel's flash in his shop, trained Don Ed Hardy. Hardy went on to revive and promote the American traditional tattoo style that Dietzel had worked in.

Jon Reiter, a tattoo artist who grew up in Milwaukee, heard about Dietzel but could not find much information about him. Reiter started collecting flash art by Dietzel and got in contact with Dietzel's grandsons, who shared boxes of memorabilia and photos with him. He wrote two books about Dietzel and worked with the Milwaukee Art Museum to hold an exhibit of Dietzel's art in 2013.
