= Franklin Paul Rogers =

American tattoo artist (1905–1990)

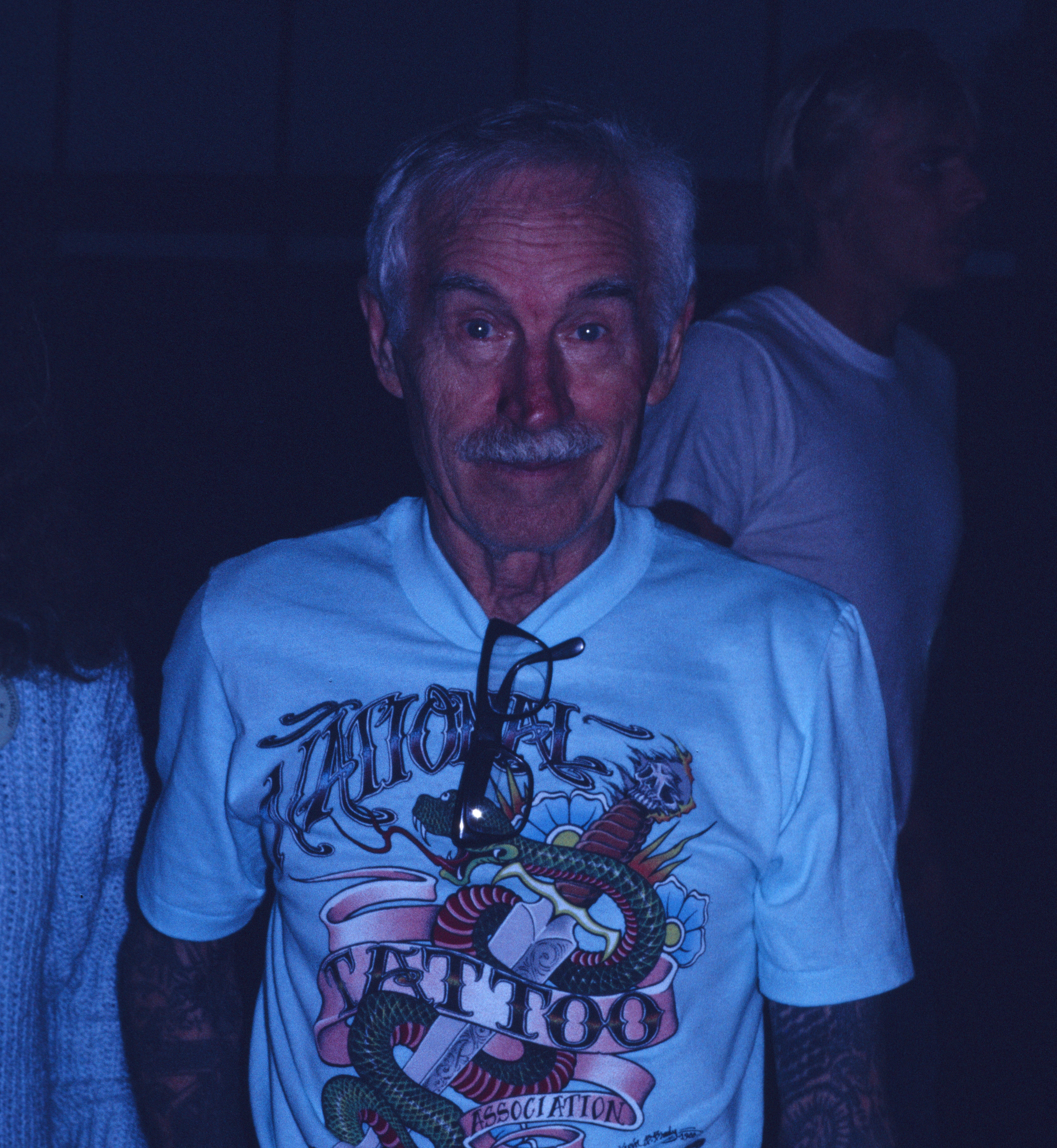
- Paul Rogers, National Tattoo Convention 1988 Orlando.
- Born: 9 September 1905; Swain County, North Carolina, US
- Died: 27 February 1990 (aged 84); Jacksonville, Florida, US
- Burial place: Greenlawn Memorial Park Cemetery, Chesapeake, Virginia, US
- Other names: Paul Rogers
- Occupation: Tattoo artist
- Spouse: Helen Gertrude Rogers

Franklin Paul Rogers (1905–1990) was an American tattoo artist. He trained under Cap Coleman in Norfolk, Virginia from 1945–1950. He designed tattoo machines, which he called "irons", a term he coined that is used in the industry. People from all over the world would visit him in his "Iron Factory" where he taught them about tattoo machine building. In his early life, he was in the traveling circus. He also helped start a mail-order supply business, Spaulding & Rogers. He is buried at Greenlawn Memorial Park Cemetery in Chesapeake, Virginia.

Rogers contributed to the development of the American traditional tattoo style. Don Lucas, a tattoo artist and tattoo historian, wrote a book based on interviews with him, titled The Father of American Tattooing (1990).

== Early life ==
Born in a cotton mill town in North Carolina, Rogers began working in the mills at age thirteen. In 1926, at the age of 21, he received his first tattoo from artist Chet Cain, an experience that prompted him to mail-order his first tattoo kit from E.J. Miller in 1928.

== Career ==
=== Early work ===
During the 1930s and the Great Depression, Rogers maintained a nomadic lifestyle, tattooing in carnival tents and bedrooms. He spent winters working in the cotton mills to support his family and summers traveling with shows such as the J.J. Page Show and the John T. Rea Happyland Show. During this period, he met his wife, Helen, who worked as a snake charmer. Rogers was also an acrobat, and his physical discipline was credited for his steady hand and professional demeanor, eschewing the "drunken sailor" stereotype often associated with tattooers of that era.

=== Norfolk ===
In 1945, Rogers began a collaboration with August "Cap" Coleman in Norfolk, Virginia, who was one of the most well-known tattoo artists in the U.S. at the time. Working with Coleman, Rogers helped solidify the foundational rules of American Traditional tattooing, emphasizing bold outlines, heavy black shading (the "black is the backbone" philosophy), and saturated, limited color palettes. Although the partnership was successful, Norfolk prohibited tattooing in 1950, leading Rogers to launch new ventures in Virginia and North Carolina with Lathan Connelly.

=== Spaulding & Rogers ===
Rogers later entered the industrial side of the trade, co-founding the mail-order supply firm Spaulding & Rogers with Huck Spaulding. The company became a major supplier of tattoo equipment, a business that mirrored the catalogs Rogers had used to start his own career. While his direct participation in the daily operations fluctuated, his association with the brand lasted until 1961.

=== Tattoo machines ===
Between 1961 and 1970, Rogers traveled extensively, working with Sailor Eddie Evans in New Jersey and Bill Williamson in Florida. In 1970, Rogers bought a mobile home in Florida, where he established a 12x12 tin shed known as the "Iron Factory."

In the Iron Factory, Rogers engineered tattoo machines that are considered among the best-running in history. His innovations included the "J-Frame", a specific frame geometry that improved balance and handling, and the "Cut-back Liner", a mechanical adjustment allowing for faster, more consistent line work. These machines were sought after by artists such as Don Ed Hardy, Kari Barba, and Bob Roberts, and remain collector's items.

== Legacy ==
Rogers was known for his openness and "friend to all" attitude. He was a dedicated mentor who advocated for the inclusion of women in the tattooing community.

Following his death in 1990 at the age of 84, Rogers' left his large collection of flash art, machines, and correspondence to the Tattoo Archive. This donation led to the formation of the Paul Rogers Tattoo Research Center (PRTRC), a non-profit organization dedicated to preserving the history of tattooing.

== See also ==
- History of tattooing
