= August Coleman =

American tattoo artist

August Bernard Coleman
- Born: 15 October 1884; Near Cincinnati, Ohio, US
- Died: 20 October 1973 (aged 89); Norfolk, Virginia, US
- Body discovered: Elizabeth River (Virginia)
- Other names: Cap
- Occupation: Tattoo artist
- Spouse: Lena Hewlett (d. 1956)

August B. "Cap" Coleman (15 October 1884 – 20 October 1973) was an American tattoo artist. Dubbed "The Godfather of American Tattooing", Coleman's tattoo flash designs had a significant influence on his generation of tattooists, and inspired artists including Franklin Paul Rogers and Sailor Jerry.

Born in about 1884 near Cincinnati, Ohio, little is known about Coleman's early life, although he claimed his father, Anthony, was a tattoo artist, and his family was believed to have lived and traveled in the carnival scene. Coleman was tattooed by Jesse Frederick Barber in Cincinnati. Coleman then enlisted with various carnival shows (Sheeshley Shows, Greater Smith Shows and Johnny J. Jones) as a tattooed attraction and tattoo artist, sometimes alongside female counterpart Lenora Platt. During his time in the carnivals he became known as "The Human Picture Gallery". In 1912, Coleman took a break from the Greater Smith Shows to work in Barber's studio where he learnt the craft of tattooing.

In 1918, Coleman relocated to Norfolk, Virginia and opened a tattoo parlor on East Main Street. The outbreak of World War I and a new naval port in Virginia brought thousands of US servicemen and sailors to Norfolk, who comprised the majority of Coleman's clientele. When Norfolk's City Council ruled tattooing illegal in June 1950 by passing Ordinance No. 15,668, Coleman and many other tattooists were forced out of the city. Many of the Norfolk tattooists, including Coleman, moved across the Elizabeth River to Portsmouth. Coleman went to work with Tex Peace there.

Coleman died October 20, 1973.

== Legacy ==
The Mariners' Museum and Park in Newport News, Virginia, holds a collection of materials purchased from Coleman in 1936, including hand-painted flash, a figurine of a man with tattoos painted on him, tattoo machines, and inks. The museum sent a photographer to take photos of Coleman and his shop.

Coleman also painted tattoos on a figurine of a woman, nicknamed Battleship Kate. The figurine was acquired by the Museum of Fine Arts, Boston, in 2020.
