= Monti Amundson =

American guitar player

"Big" Monti Amundson is an American guitar player who plays blues and rock and roll. His style has been compared to that of Stevie Ray Vaughan, and while commercial success has eluded him, he has built a reputation as a live act in the United States and in Europe, first as a power trio called Monti Amundson & The Blubinos, then under his own name.

== Career ==
Amundson's first band of note was the Generic Rock Band. A popular bar band in 1982 they mostly covered current MTV favs of the day. Shortly after GRB, a local favorite of the Eugene bar scene and college crowd broke up, Monti moved on to form a new band called Boys Club. Boys Club competed in a Battle-of-the-Bands competition at B.J. Kelly's in the Spring of 1983. They won against another very popular local bar band at the time called The Fabulous Secrets. Boys Club broke up not long after and he moved to Portland and formed The Blubinos, variously marketed under that name and as Monti Amundson & The Blubinos. Besides Amundson, the band consisted of Debbie Smith (bass) (later replaced by Stan Becraft, then Johnny Wilmont) and Cory Burden (drums), and played Texas blues in clubs in Eugene, Oregon, from the 1980s on. The band recorded half a dozen records in Portland and Eugene, and was signed to a Dutch label after the second album, Mean Eighteen. The band played a farewell show in Eugene in 1992, but recorded two more albums until 1997. Distribution in the United States was problematic, and Amundson was so frustrated that in 1997 he had bootlegs printed of his own Man on the Floor to sell at shows in the US ("Man, I've done some bone-head shit in my time," as he later acknowledged), which led to a conflict with his Dutch company which, in the end, was amiably settled. Bothered by personal problems and a lack of commercial success, he was without record deal and didn't record any albums between 2000 and 2005, when he hooked up with Billy Triplett, a Portland studio engineer, and recorded Big Monti, now without the Blubinos, which was released in 2005.

A side project of his is the Sultans of Slide, a group of slide blues guitar players that performed occasional shows starting in 2009, when it consisted of Amundson, Franck "Paris Slim" Goldwasser, Jim Mesi, Bob Shoemaker, and Ben Bonham. In 2011, the Sultans of Slide consisted of Amundson, Henry Cooper and Goldwasser, and released a record, Lightning Strikes, which was promoted with a tour in Europe.

In 2010 he released a 4-CD compilation, gathering "30 years of songwriting"; he noted that he's been writing the same song since he was thirteen and penned "Woman": "I've been writing pretty much the same song ever since. Yeah, there's broke down cars and drinking songs, but mostly it's about love and loss. I've had both in spades."

== Discography ==
=== With the Blubinos ===
- Straight Out! (1990)
- The Mean Eighteen (1991)
- The Obvious Rock (1995)
- Unglued (1996)
- I See Trouble (1996)
- Man on the Floor (1997)
- Bootleg (1997)

=== As Monti Amundson ===
- Big Monti-Live! (1998)
- Prove Me Wrong (2000)
- Big Monti Blues (compilation, 2001)
- Big Monti (2005)
- Somebody's Happened to Our Love (2006)
- Continental Breakfast (2007)
- Rock Treatment (2009)
- The Songwriter (2010)

=== With the Sultans of Slide ===
- Lightning Strikes (2011)
