= Norman E. Amundson =

Canadian academic

Norman E. Amundson is a professor of counseling psychology at the University of British Columbia.

== Biography ==
Amundson has undertaken research on career development and on Canadian immigration issues. One reviewer said he has "a well-established, international reputation as a scholar and leader in career counselling, but what makes his work singular is that he is a public intellectual whose scholarship can be taken up by diverse communities."

In 2014, Amundson received the NCDA Eminent Career Award, which is the highest honor given by the National Career Development Association.

== Publication ==
- Amundson, Norman (1997). "Myths, Metaphors, and Moxie: The 3Ms Of Career Counseling". Journal of Employment Counseling. 34 (2): 76–84. doi:10.1002/j.2161-1920.1997.tb00461.x.
- Amundson, Norman E. (1995). "Action Planning Through the Phases of Counseling". Journal of Employment Counseling. 32 (4): 147–153. doi:10.1002/j.2161-1920.1995.tb01092.x.
- Amundson, Norman E. (1994). "Negotiating Identity During Unemployment". Journal of Employment Counseling. 31 (3): 98–104. doi:10.1002/j.2161-1920.1994.tb00178.x.
- Amundson, Norman E. (1993). "Mattering: A Foundation for Employment Counseling and Training". Journal of Employment Counseling. 30 (4): 146–152. doi:10.1002/j.2161-1920.1993.tb00173.x.
- Klein, Hal; Amundson, Norman; Borgen, William (1992). "The Dynamics of Unemployment for Social Assistance Recipients". Journal of Employment Counseling. 29 (2): 88–94. doi:10.1002/j.2161-1920.1992.tb00159.x.
- Amundson, Norman; Borgen, William; Westwood, Marvin (1990). "Group Employment Counseling in Canada". Journal of Employment Counseling. 27 (4): 181–190. doi:10.1002/j.2161-1920.1990.tb00378.x.
- Amundson, Norman E. (1989). "A Model for Individual Career Counseling". Journal of Employment Counseling. 26 (3): 132–138. doi:10.1002/j.2161-1920.1989.tb00943.x.
