= Flash (tattoo) =

Pre-prepared tattoo design

"Death before dishonor" flash circa 1940

Tattoo flash is any tattoo design ready-made for customers to avoid the need for custom designs, or as a starting point for custom work. Tattoo flash was designed for rapid tattooing and used in "street shops"—tattoo shops handling a large volume of standardized tattoos for walk-in customers. Pieces of flash are traditionally drawn, painted, or printed on paper, and displayed for walk-in customers in binders or on the walls of tattoo shops. Today they may also be advertised online and on social media.

== History ==
The term "flash" is derived from the traveling carnival and circus trade in the late 1800s: an attraction needed to be eye-catching to draw in the crowd, and that visual appeal was called flash. Tattoo artists working at those carnivals would hang up their designs in front of their booths to catch people's attention, so they adopted "flash" as a term for this artwork. Traveling tattoo artists developed sketchbooks of designs that were easy to transport and show to potential customers.

Sketchbook of designs circa 1900–1945

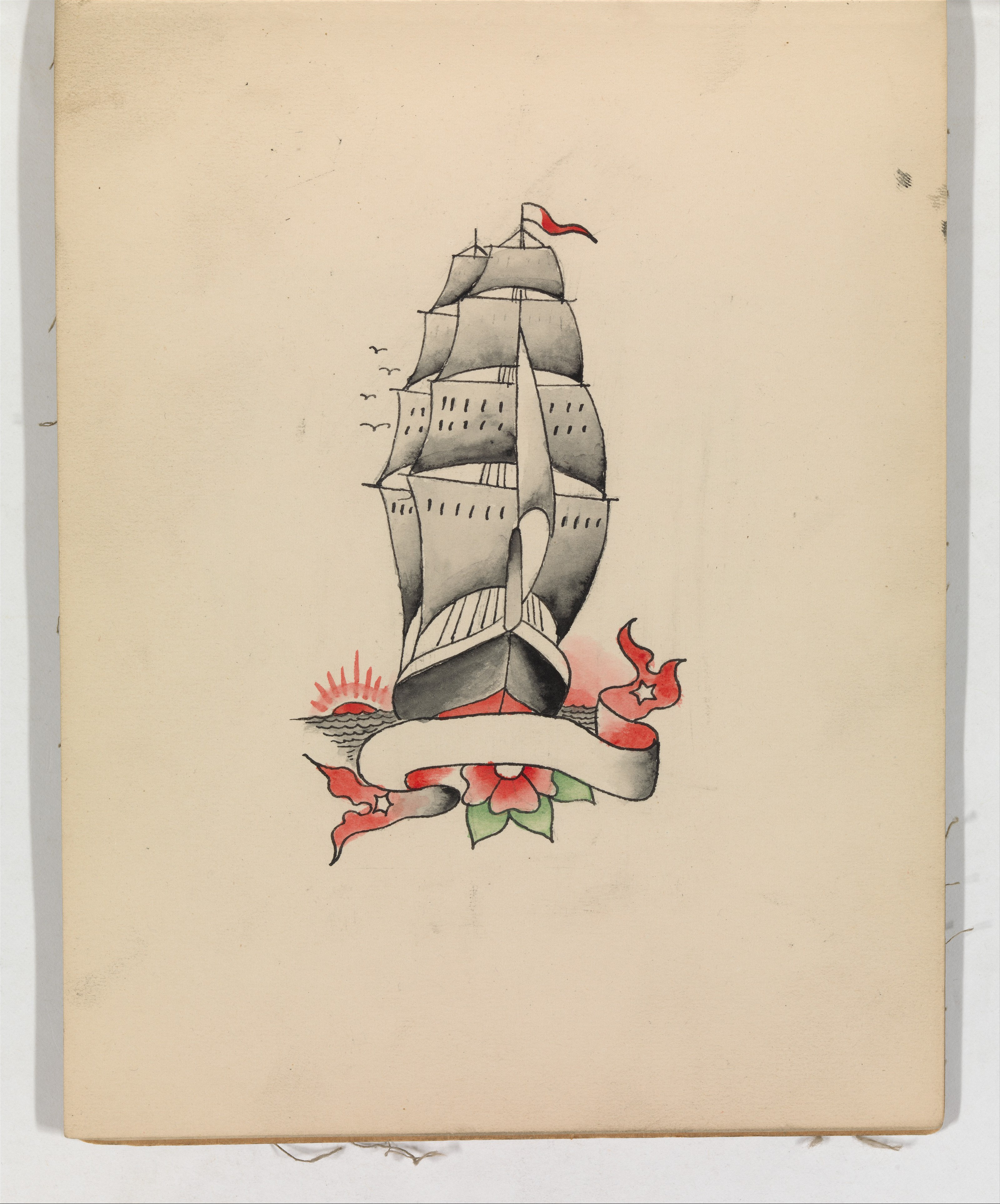
Ship

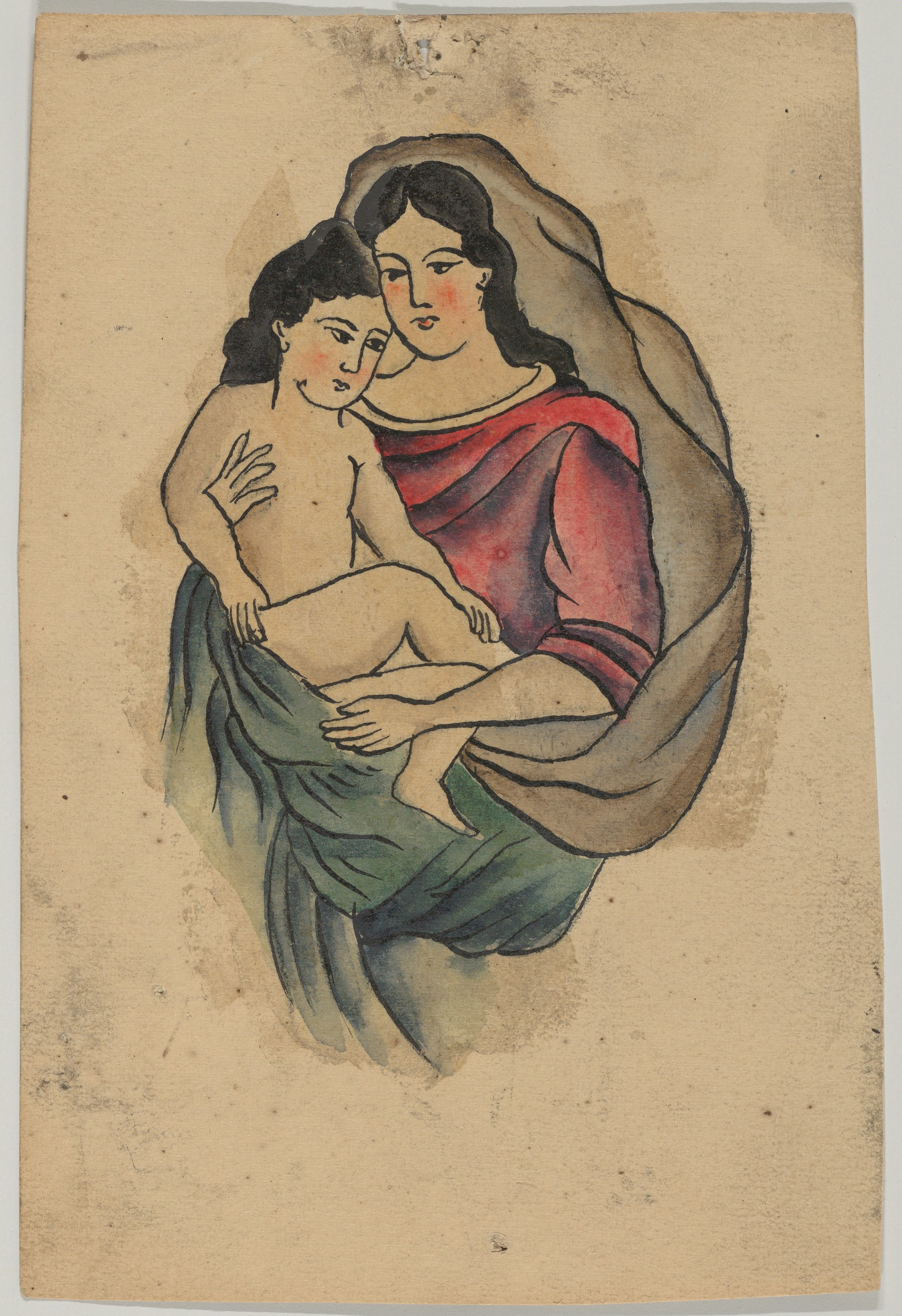
Madonna and child

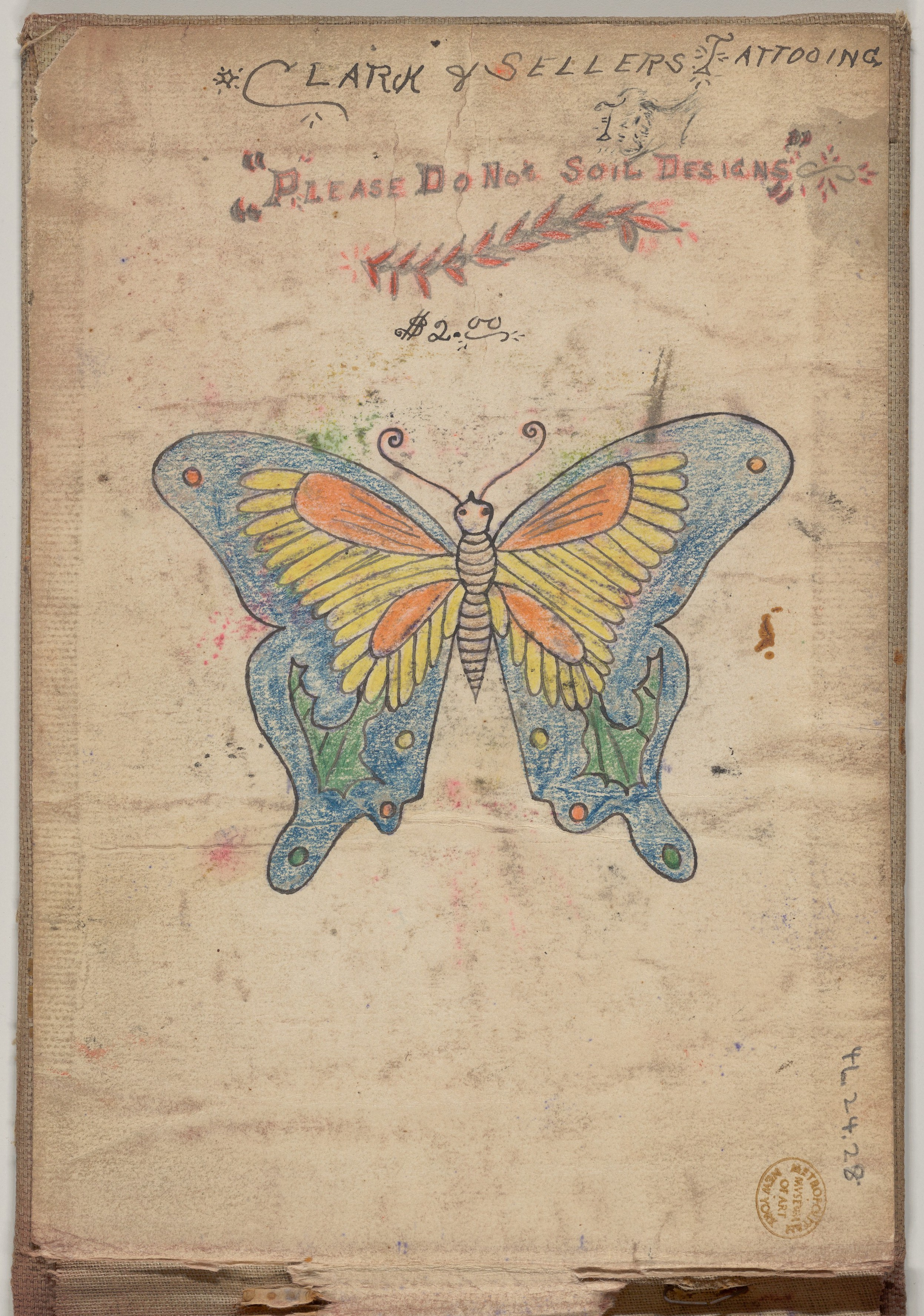
Butterfly

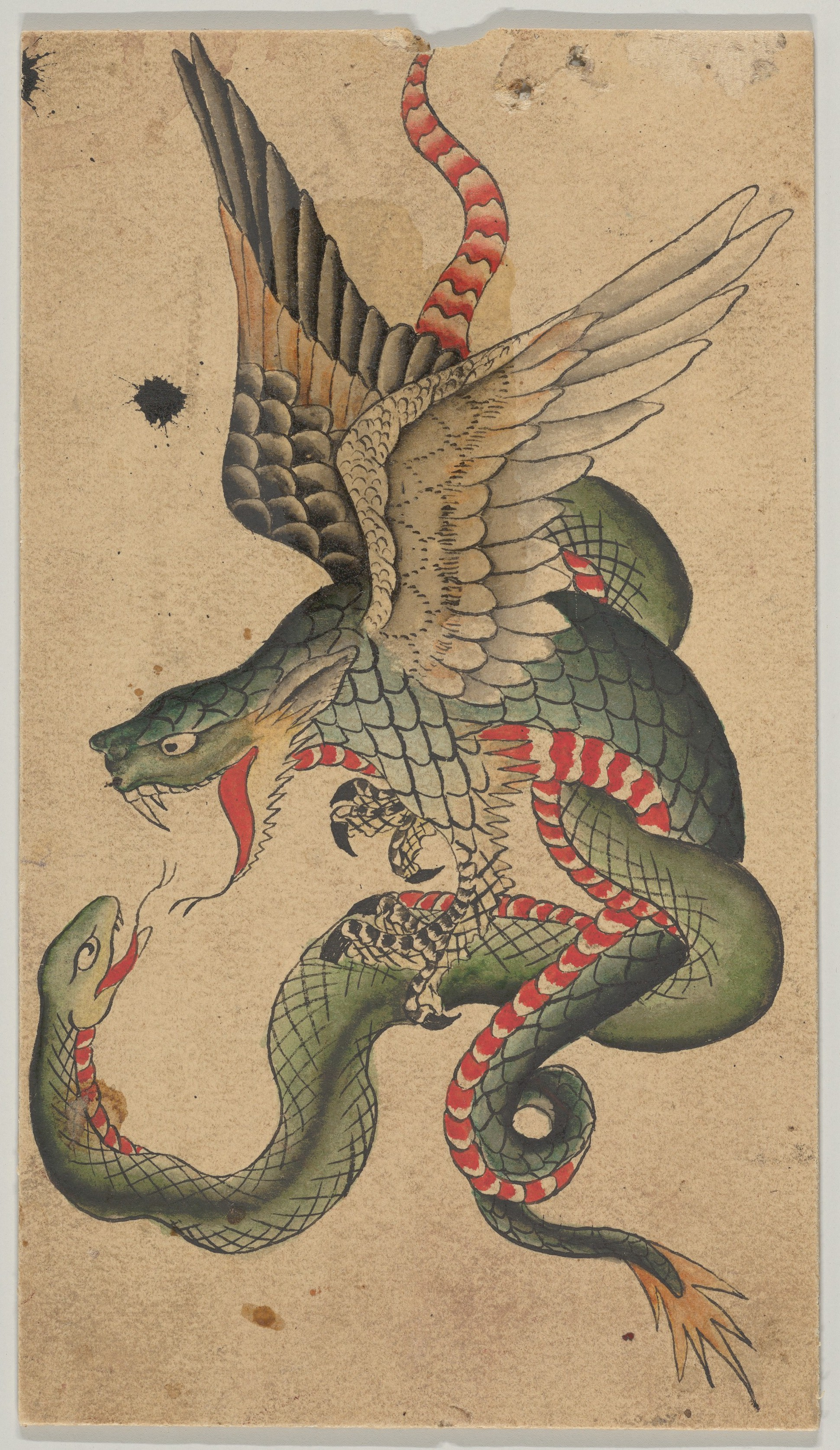
Dragon and snake

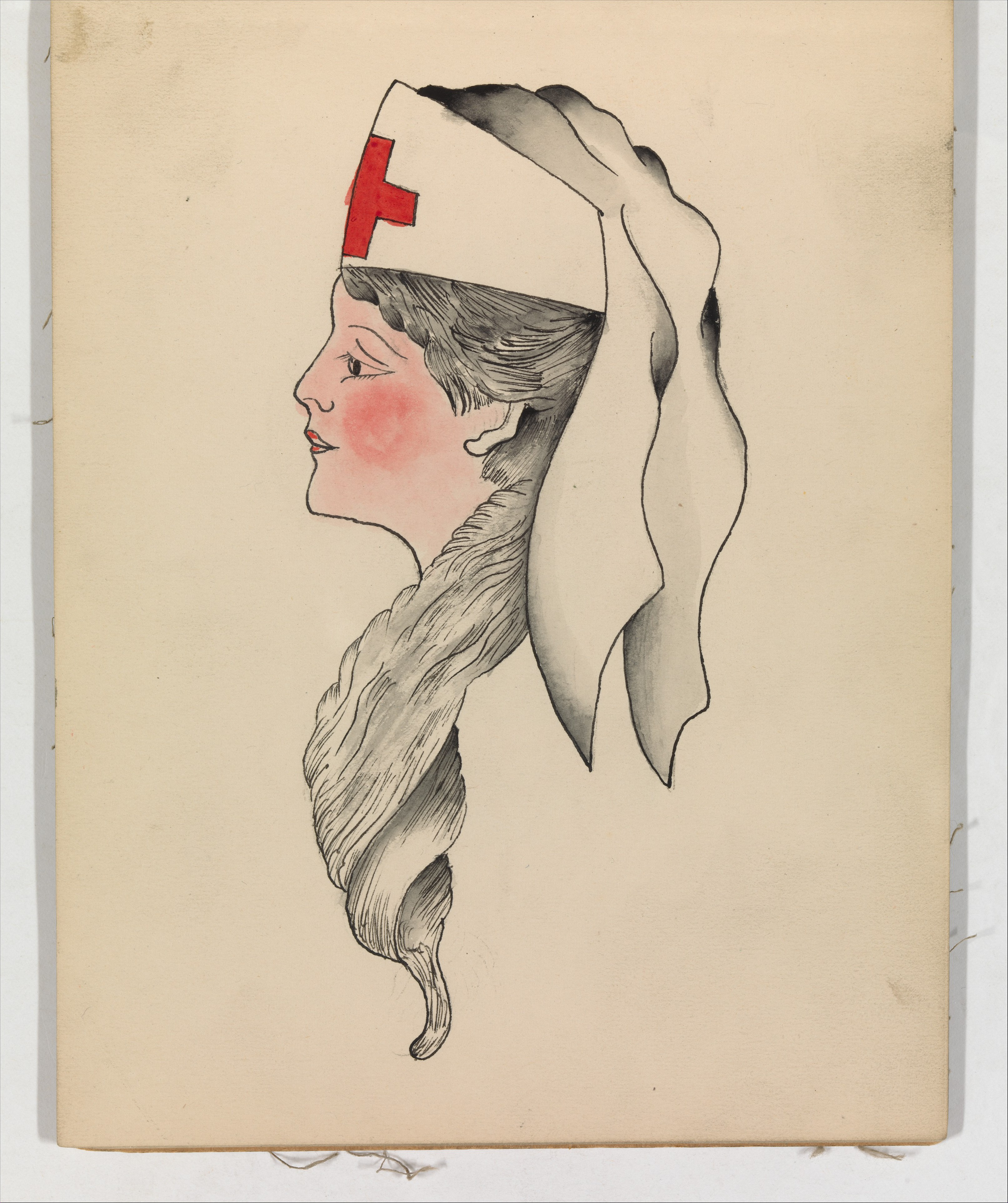
Army nurse

The development of electric tattoo machines in the 1890s enabled faster and more precise tattooing. More tattoo artists started to work from shops as a full-time profession. To fulfill increased demand for tattoos, especially sailor tattoos, artists bought and sold sets of pre-drawn designs. These "flash" designs were on larger sheets of paper than sketchbook pages, intended to be framed and hung on walls. Many of these designs were relatively simple — with black outlines, limited colors, and limited shading — to enable quick work. Skilled professional tattoo artists sold flash to other artists, who sought out quality designs to advertise to potential customers. This process of selling and buying attractive sets of designs helped shape American traditional tattooing into a more consistent genre.

Many common flash designs are still in this "old school" style. For example, Lew Alberts (1880–1954), known as Lew the Jew, was a prolific tattoo artist who created and sold many sheets of tattoo patterns. In 2009, a scholar wrote that a large amount of the conventional designs on the walls of contemporary shops were based on designs by Alberts. August "Cap" Coleman (1884–1973) also contributed to the development of American traditional flash, refining designs to be more readable and durable with strong black outlines and black shading. Milton Zeis (1901–1972) sold thousands of flash designs to tattoo artists through his mail-order tattoo supply business, including in the 1940s and 1950s.

20th century flash

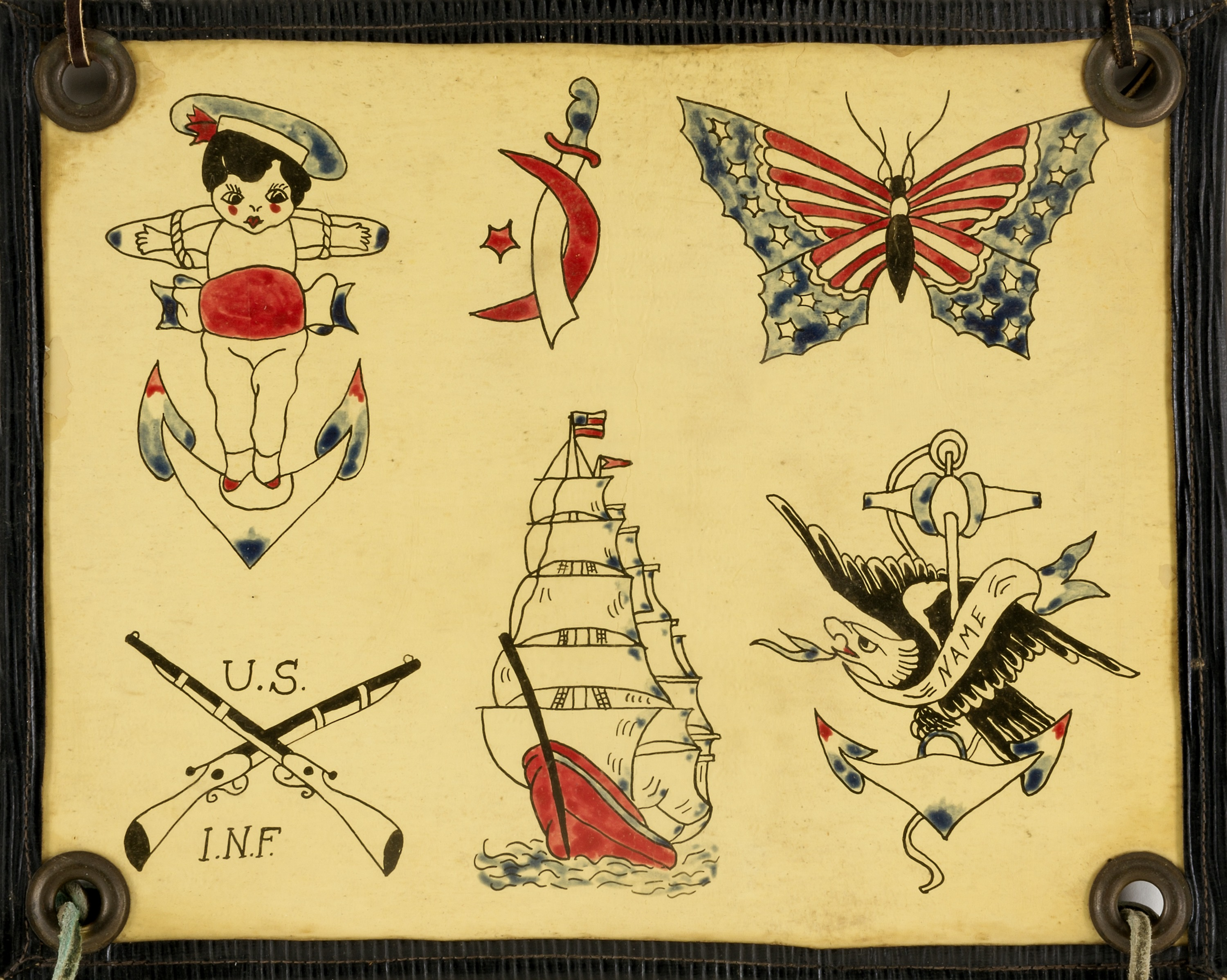
Ship, military symbols

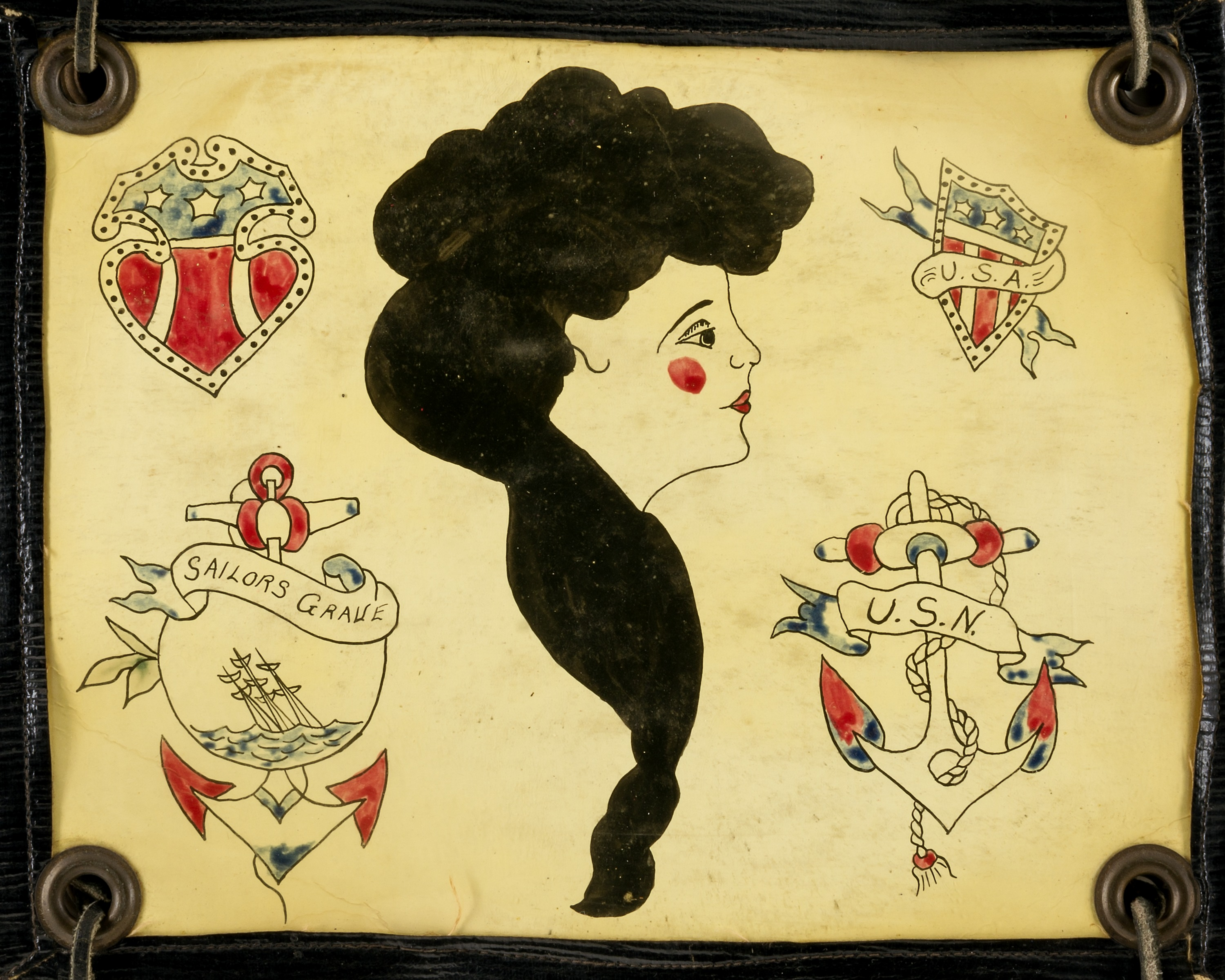
Lady head, Navy symbols

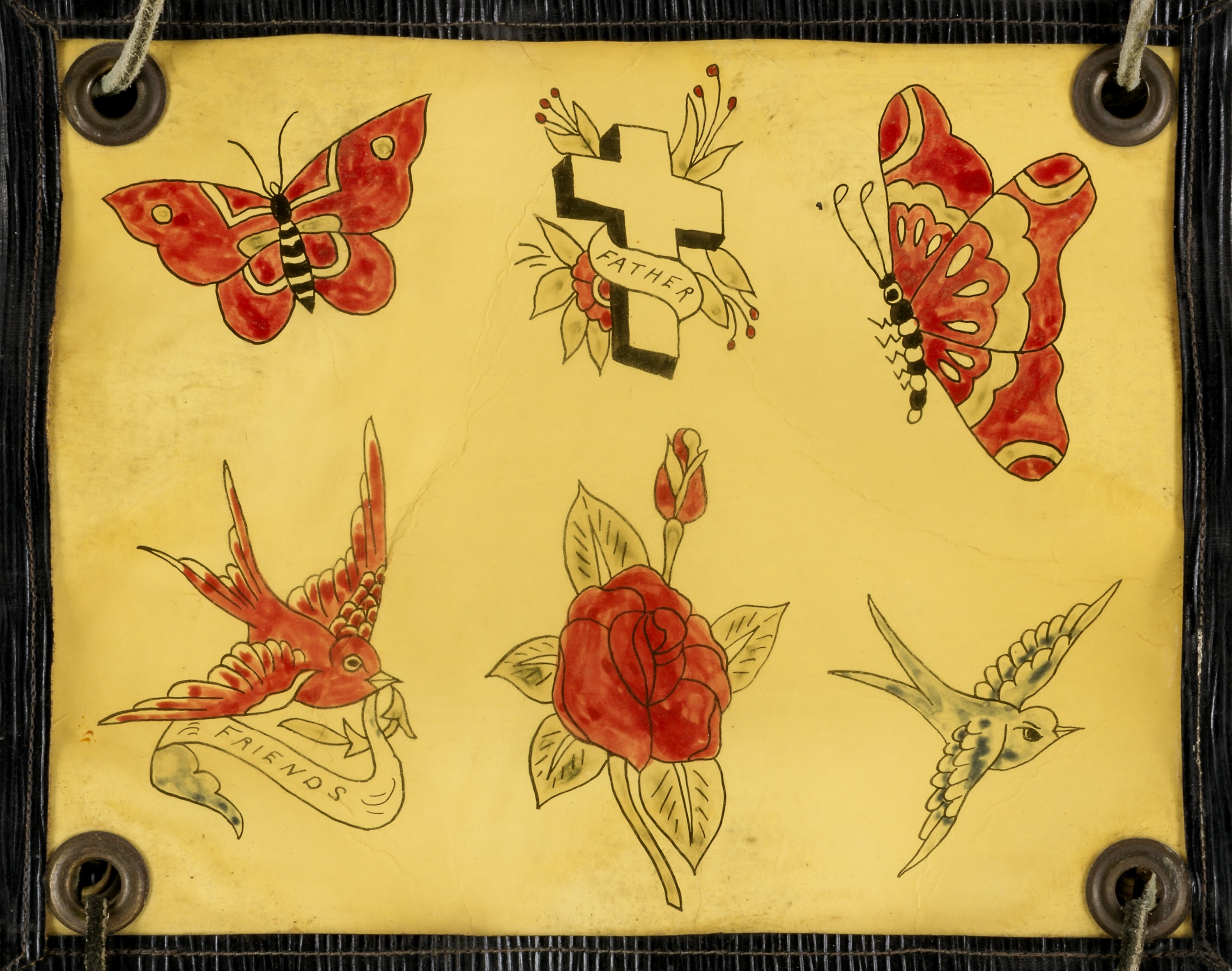
Butterflies, cross, birds, rose

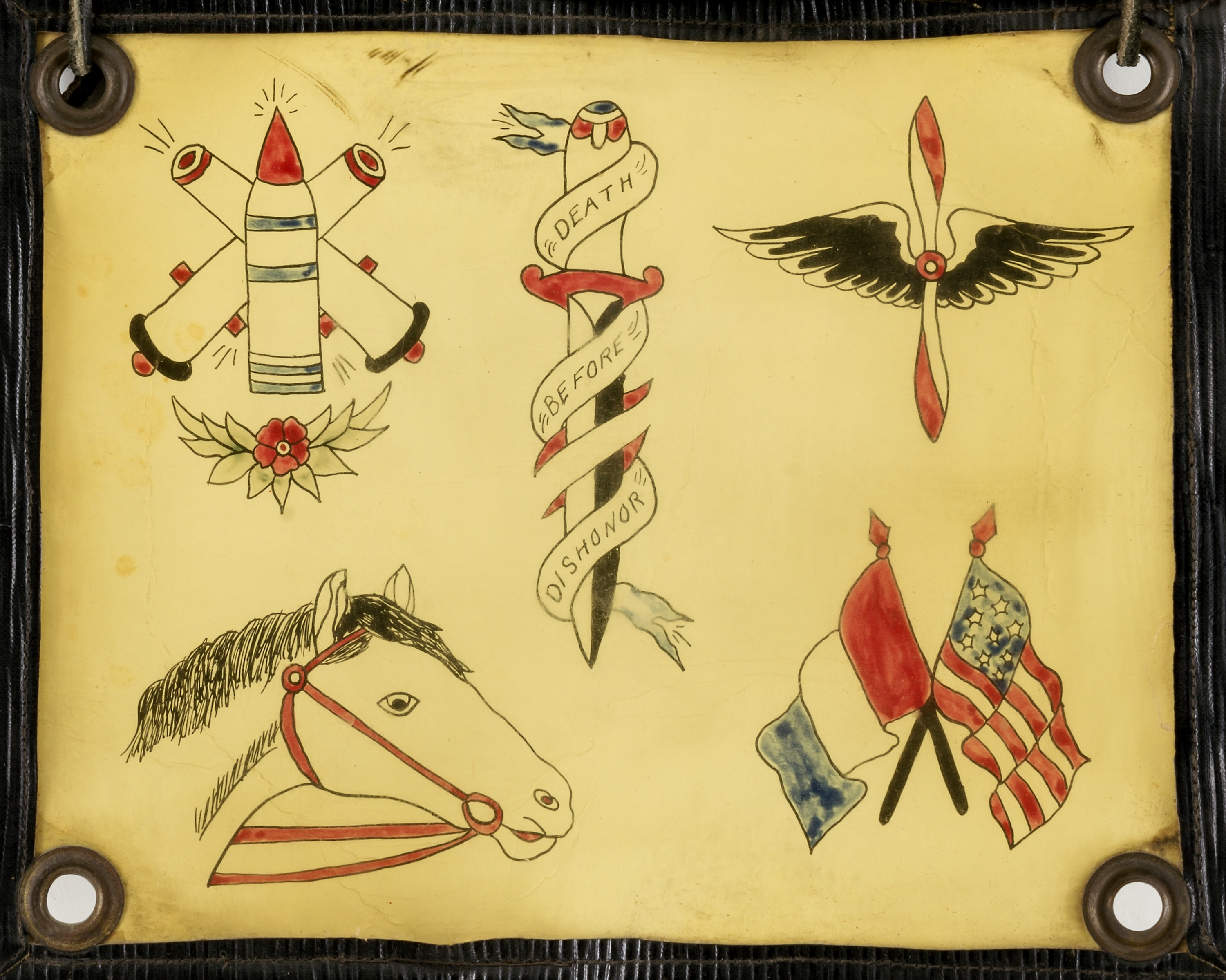
"Death before dishonor"

In the 1980s there was a shift in iconography from badge-like images based on flash to customized large tattoos influenced by Polynesian and Japanese tattoo art, such as sleeves. By the year 2000, most tattoo studios had become custom shops, with the flash serving largely as a reference for ideas. Most tattoo designs are created by the tattoo artist developing an idea brought in by the customer.

== Materials ==
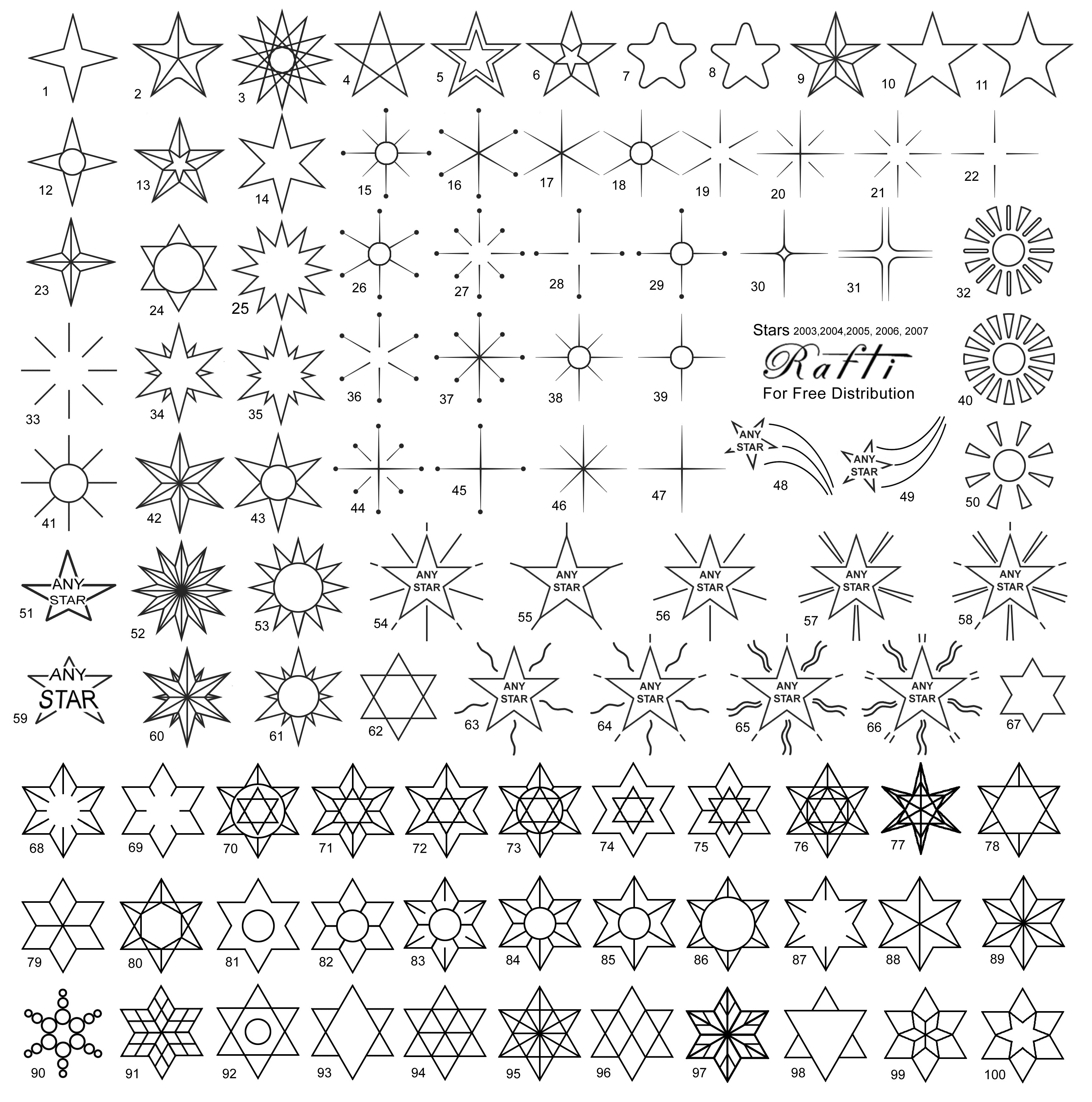
Tattoo flash sets include a black and white stencil sheet, and they may include a pre-colored sheet as well

Flash may be drawn by the individual tattooist for display and use in their own studio, or traded and sold among other tattooists. Hand-drawn, local tattoo flash has been largely replaced by professional flash artists who produce prints of copyrighted flash to sell at conventions or through the Internet.

Tattoo flash is commonly printed on 11x14 inch sheets in North America. Tattoo flash may come with an outline, also known as a line drawing, printed on a separate sheet, so that tattoo artists do not need to draw the linework themselves.
