= Amundsen (surname) =

Amundsen is a Norwegian surname. Amundsen literally means son of Amund. Notable people with this surname include the following:

- Arthur Amundsen (1886–1936), Norwegian gymnast who competed in the 1908 and 1912 Summer Olympics
- Asle Amundsen (born 1952), Norwegian politician for the Socialist Left Party
- Carl Morten Amundsen (born 1961), Norwegian dramaturge and theatre director
- Harald Amundsen (born 1962), Norwegian sprint canoer
- Harald Østberg Amundsen (born 1998), Norwegian cross-country skier
- Hedda Østberg Amundsen (born 1998), Norwegian cross-country skier
- Jan Tore Amundsen (born 1983), Norwegian football midfielder
- Marius Amundsen (born 1992), Norwegian footballer
- Mauritz Amundsen (1904–1982), Norwegian Olympic sport shooter
- Monte Amundsen (1930–2011), American opera and musical singer
- Olaf Amundsen (1876–1939), Norwegian politician for the Liberal Party
- Per-Willy Amundsen (born 1971), Norwegian politician and MP for the Progress Party
- Roald Amundsen (1872–1928), Norwegian explorer of the polar region
- Steinar Amundsen (1945–2022), Norwegian sprint canoer who competed in the 1968 Summer Olympics
