= Moravian axe-shaped bars =

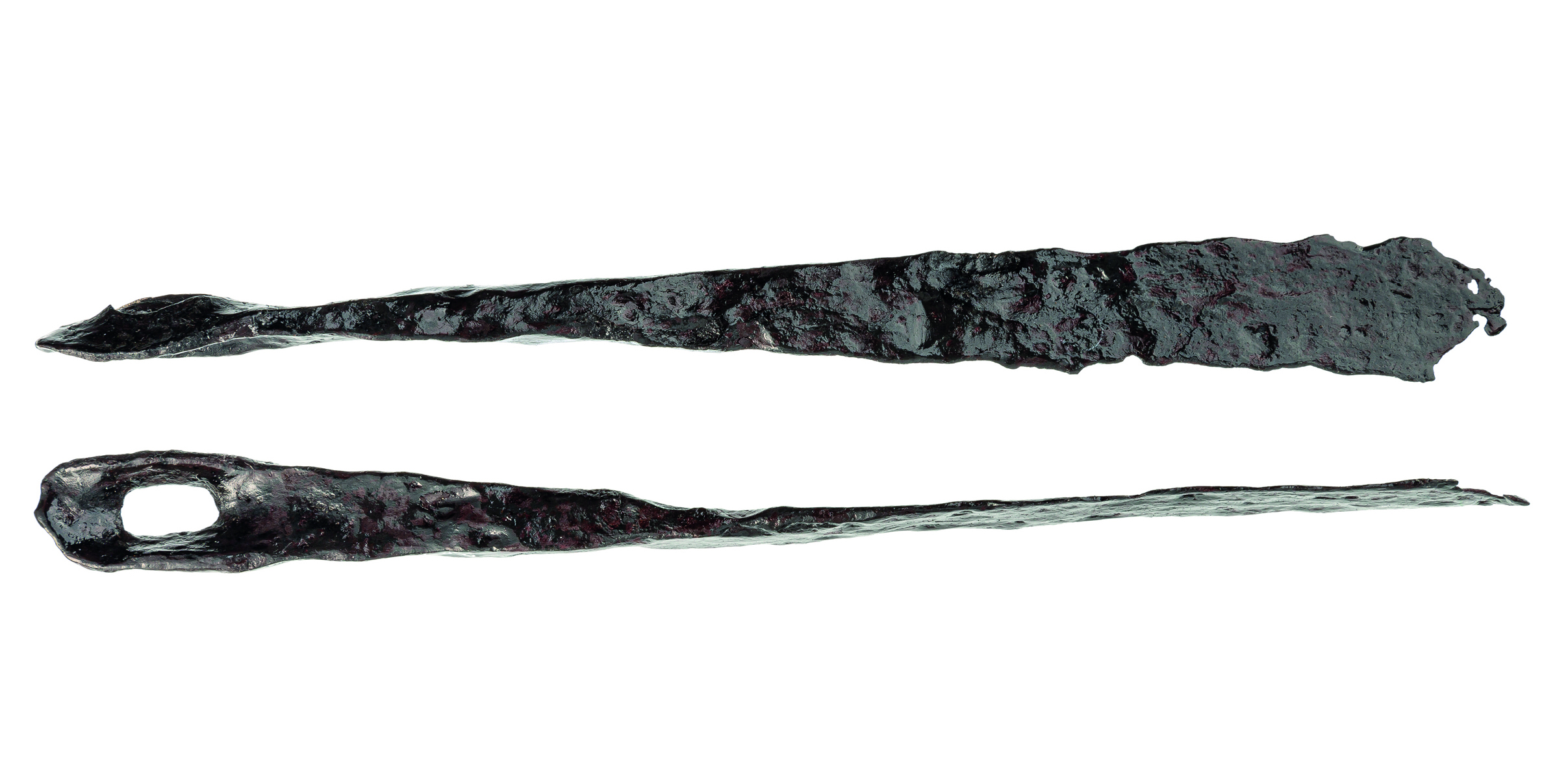
- Axe-shaped bar from the Great Moravian centre in Mikulčice-Valy

Occurrence
- Moravia, Slovakia, Lesser Poland

Chronology
- 9th–10th centuries AD

Function
- Pre-commercial currency, monetary tokens

Moravian axe-shaped bars are iron bars stylized into the shape of long axes made by the Great Moravians during the 9th and early 10th centuries AD. These archaeological finds have primarily been found in the former core of Great Moravia, in what is today the region of Moravia in the Czech Republic, and western Slovakia. However, they have also been found in Silesia, in eastern Slovakia, and in Lesser Poland. In Lesser Poland, a large hoard of over 4,000 axe-shaped bars was found near Kraków.

Outside of the Central European region, archaeologists have found similar bars in Russia along the Volga and Kama rivers in modern-day Tatarstan and Udmurtia, dating back to the 4th and 5th centuries AD. They have also been found in southern Norway. In this area, their occurrence is the earliest, dating back to the early Iron Age. They also survived there the longest; written mentions of them date back to the 13th century. Similarly stylized iron bars referring to other types of axes are also known from Sweden.

== Terminology ==
Although the term axe-shaped hryvnia is used for these iron artefacts in Czech, Slovak and Polish archaeology (Czech: sekerovité hřivny; Slovak: sekerovité hrivny; Polish: grzywny siekieropodobne), referring to the chronologically later silver currency of Kievan Rus, their original early-medieval name is unknown. The first Czechoslovak archaeologists investigating the former Great Moravian centers tried to recognize practical tools in them; therefore, they referred to them as carpenter's axes, cleavers, or narrow chisels. Archeologist Antonín Zelnitius, investigating the Great Moravian center in Staré Město (Uherské Hradiště District), reports on them for the first time as iron hryvnias around 1945. Archaeologist Josef Poulík subsequently took over the name, discovering similar artifacts in one of the other important period centers in Mikulčice-Valy. With the increase in the intensity of archaeological excavations after World War II and the increasing number of finds from other Great Moravian centers, the term axe-shaped hryvnia became commonly used in the regional archaeological community.

However, the question of the original naming of the artifacts is still open. The contemporary legal text Zakon Sudnyi Liudem preserves in the list of fines for various offenses the name of the local accounting unit called stljaz, in which the fines are measured together with the weight of gold. Due to the assumed linguistic affinity of the original Old Slavic form *stьlęzь with words close in meaning to today's words connected with chopping or cutting (Czech: sekat, rubat), there is a possibility that it could also have been the original early medieval designation of the axe-shaped bars or the monetary unit that these artefacts represented.

== Shape and size ==
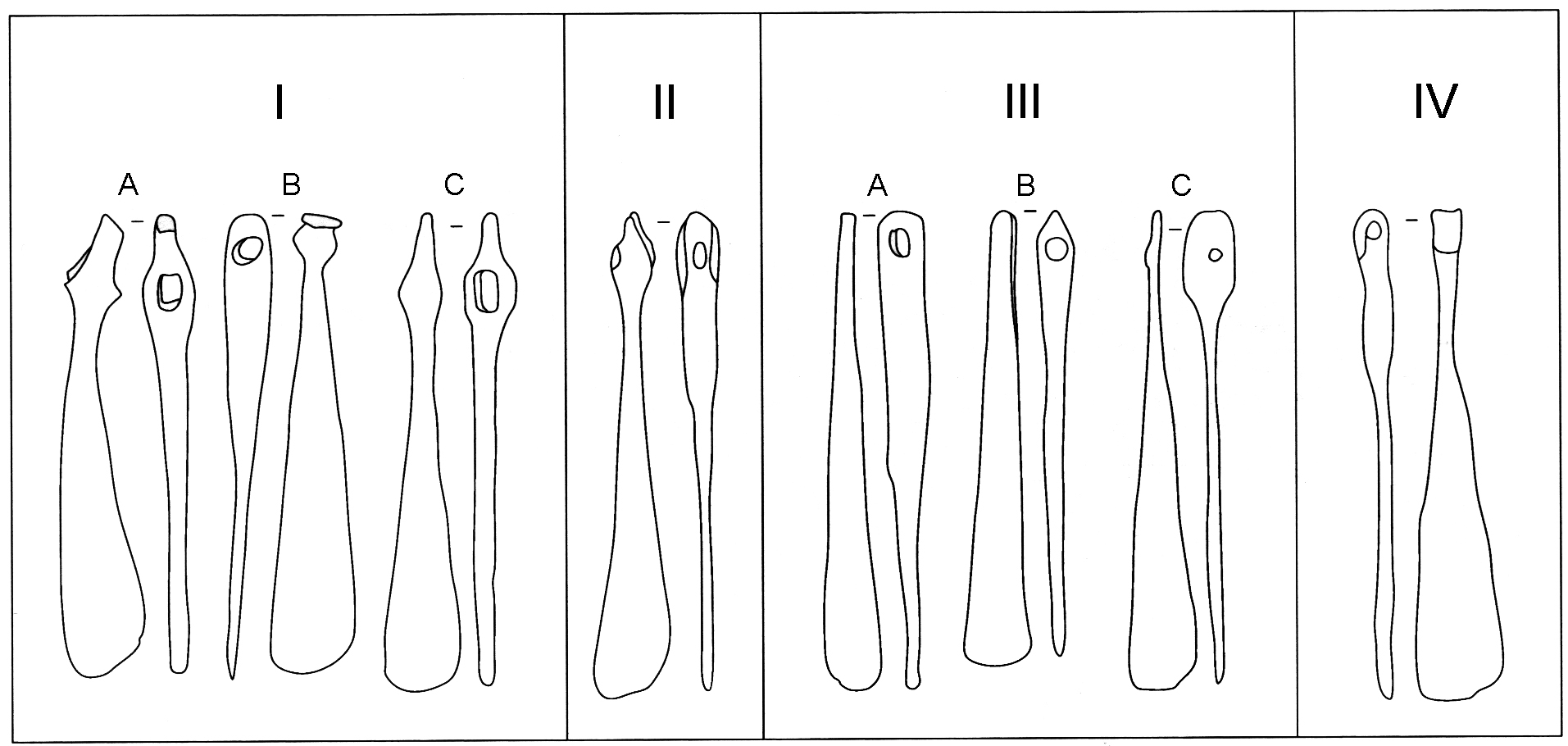
A stylistic typology of Moravian axe-shaped bars.

The source for the production of axe-shaped bars was square iron rods of various sizes. A substantial part of the rod was hammered into a gradually widening sheet imitating the blade of a long axe. The eye of the axe was then represented by the occipital part of the bar pierced with a punch pin. However, the "blade" of axe-shaped bars no longer had a sharpened and carburized cutting edge, and the eye in the vast majority of cases was not able to hold the wooden handle. In terms of length, Moravian axe-shaped bars ranged from massive pieces almost half a meter long and weighing around 1 kg to miniature specimens with a length of just a few centimeters and weighing only several grams. Archaeologists have tried to capture their characteristic length and stylistic diversity through several typologies. Archaeologist Radomír Pleiner distinguishes three length categories – large bars (40 to 47 cm), medium bars (21 to 28 cm), small bars (15 to 17 cm), and miniature bars (5 to 8 cm). Due to the much greater length and weight variability of the finds however, this division must be considered only approximate, rather than reflecting the former standardization of production. Archaeologist Darina Bialeková attempted a classification based on the nature of the piercing of the eyes in the occipital parts of the bars. The typology distinguishes four basic types (which are further divided into several subtypes). Type I bars are the closest in shape to the original axes, and the piercing of the eye is completed by pulling out the side lobes originally used to stabilize the wooden handle. Type II bars are characterized by a simplified design of the eye, the original lobes are only symbolically indicated by the groove of the occipital part in the vicinity of the piercing. This groove then completely disappears in type III bars, which are punched quite simply, without any additional modifications. Type IV bars are then no longer pierced at all, but the eye of the occipital part is created by bending the rod. Both above-described typologies are then combined by the latest typochronological model, which considers the pieces that are the largest and most similar in shape to real axes as chronologically the oldest, and perceives further simplification of shape and shortening of length as a parallel consequence of the gradual transformation of their social and economic function.

== Evolution and function ==
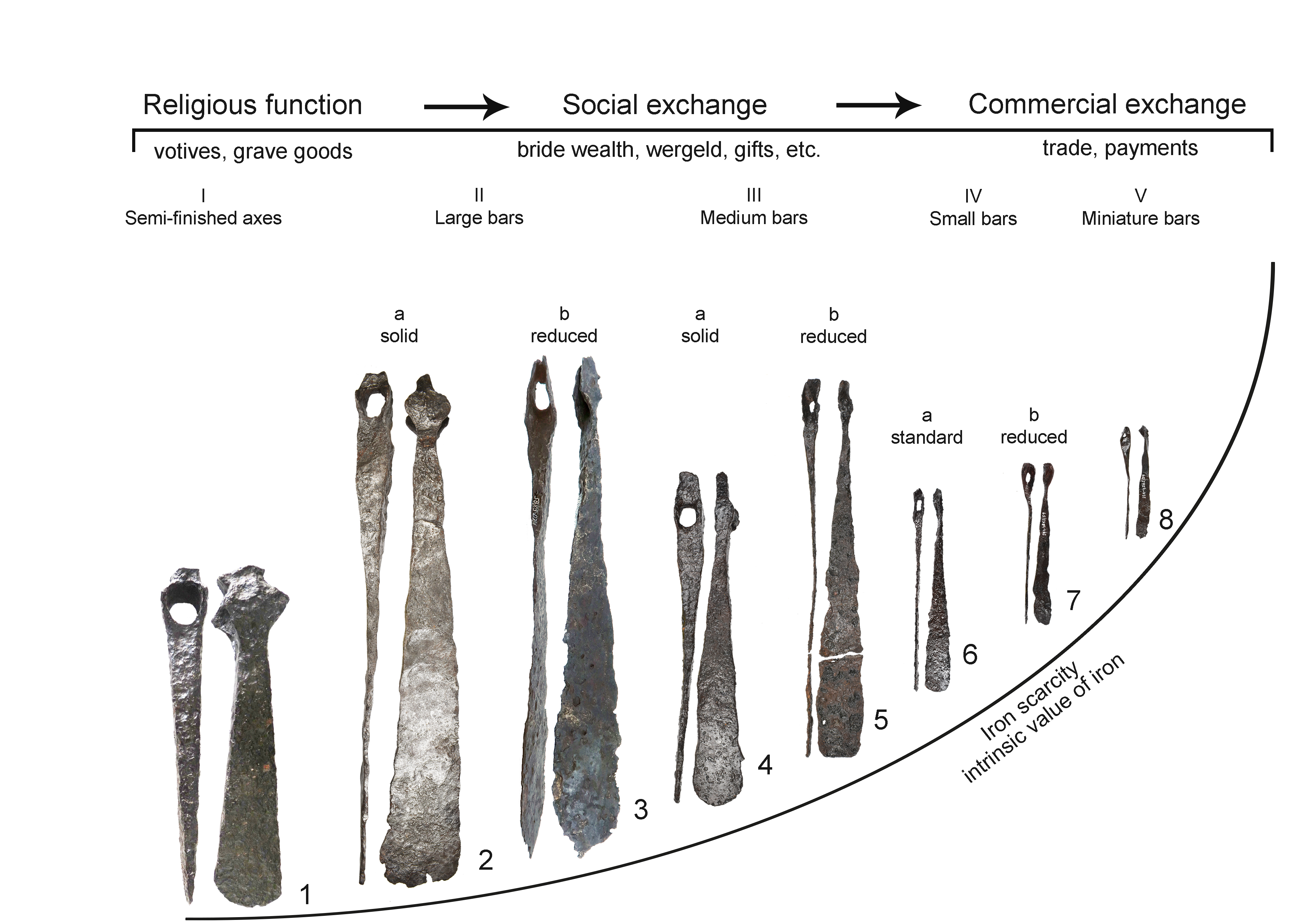
Scheme of the presumed evolution of axe-shaped bars and the transformation of their function in the Moravian society of the 9th century.

Originally, archaeologists thought of Moravian axe-shaped bars as practical tools or even weapons. One opinion even suggested that the bars were used as a type of boomerang. However, due to the unsuitability of their shape for crafting and the poor quality of their blades, these hypotheses were soon abandoned. Problematic were also the opinions that these bars were just idiosyncratic iron semi-finished products used for transporting iron from smelting sites to forges, where they were to be further processed. There is no archaeological evidence of forges from the Great Moravian period located directly at smelting sites. It is thus quite improbable that the bars were produced there. Additionally, there is no evidence of the occurrence of any axe-shaped bars on smelting sites from that time. Moreover, experimental production of axe-shaped bars and their subsequent processing clearly demonstrated that their shape is completely unsuitable for further processing and leads to noticeable losses of iron mass. Current research thus leans towards the opinion that Moravian axe-shaped bars were a regional variant of primitive money (or, in D. Graeber's term, social currency), i.e., pre-coin currency, which has countless analogies around the world. These stylized objects usually circulated in pre-commercial economies and were used for gift-giving and payments, leading to the establishment, strengthening, or correction of relationships between individuals, clans, or entire communities. Examples of such payments include payments for brides or blood money (e.g., weregild).

The origins of the axe-shaped bars are assumed to be in the pre-Christian period, where axes most likely played a specific role as ritual offerings or grave gifts. The neglect of the practical function of these axes at the expense of their symbolic function, together with the increasing demand for iron, probably led to their gradual simplification until the stage when they took on a stylized shape, from which it was no longer possible to create a full-fledged axe. These difficult-to-practical products then began to circulate in contemporary society as currency, and their smaller variants were probably later also integrated as a medium of exchange in the nascent Great Moravian market. Moravian axe-shaped bars disappear from archaeological finds during the 10th century, i.e., at the time when Great Moravia and its economic system collapsed. However, evaluations of some Great Moravian central sites show that axe-shaped bars could still circulate for some time after the collapse. The onset of minting, which penetrated Moravia around this time, could also have played a role in the definitive disappearance of the Moravian axe-shaped bars from the archaeological record.
