= Sailor tattoo =

Nautical tradition of body art

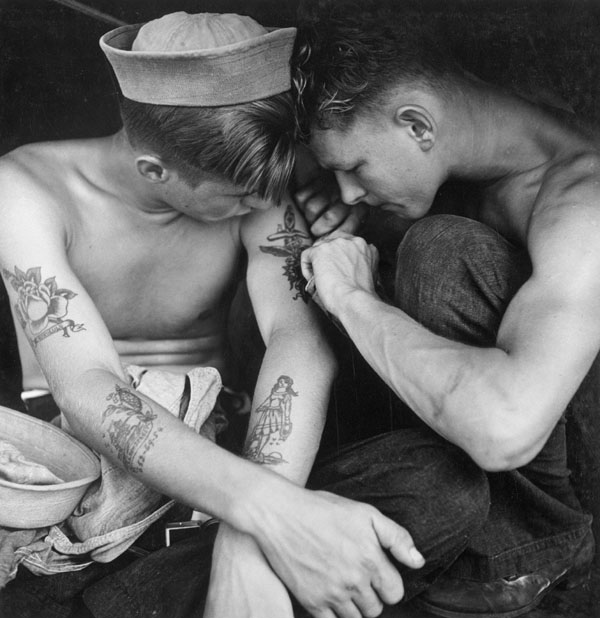
Aboard the USS New Jersey, 1944

Sailor tattoos are tattooing traditions among European and American seafarers, including naval service members and merchant mariners, and tattoo designs and styles influenced by those traditions. These practices date back to at least the 16th century among European sailors, and they spread to sailors in British colonies, including those that became the United States and Canada. People participating in these traditions have included military service members in national navies, civilian mariners on merchant ships, and fishermen. In particular, there are records of significant numbers of tattoos on U.S. Navy sailors in the American Revolution, Civil War, World War I, and World War II. Sailor tattoos have served as a form of identification, protective talismans in sailors' superstitions, records of experiences, markers of identity, and means of self-expression.

For centuries, tattooing among sailors mostly happened during downtime at sea, applied by hand with sewing needles and tattoo ink made with simple pigments such as soot and gunpowder. These informal tattooists applied a folk art vocabulary including crucifixes, heart symbols, and nautical images such as anchors, mermaids, and tall ships, along with names and initials. Starting around the 1870s, some former sailors began opening professional tattoo shops in port cities in the United States and Europe. This trend increased after the development of the electric tattoo machine in the 1890s, which enabled faster application of tattoos and more elaborate tattoo designs. Many customers of these early professional tattoo artists were sailors.

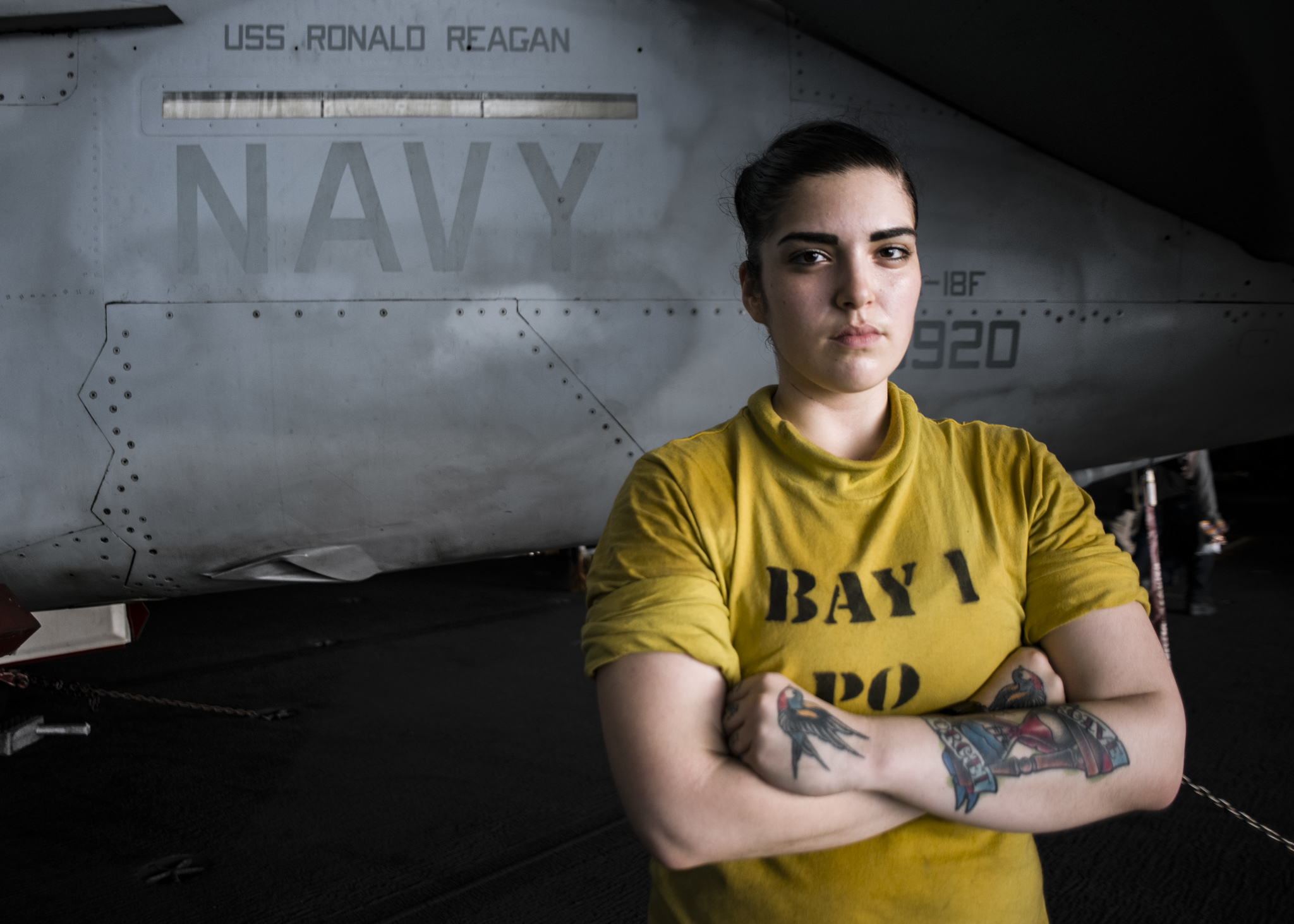
On USS Ronald Reagan, 2016

American tattoo artists in the late 1800s and early 1900s tended to offer simple designs with black outlines and limited colors, which enabled quick work. By the 1920s–1930s, some of them created and sold sets of pre-drawn designs (flash) in this style, including many maritime-inspired motifs. This style became known as American traditional (old school). This style was further popularized in subsequent decades through the work of prolific tattoo artists such as Sailor Jerry in Honolulu. After a period of fading interest, tattoo artists including Don Ed Hardy promoted a nostalgic revival of American traditional tattooing in the late 1990s and early 2000s. Many sea service members continue to participate in sailor tattoo traditions, and the style remains popular among the general public as well.

In creative works including literature, visual art, and advertising, sailors are often portrayed with tattoos as a distinctive sign of their profession. Tattooed sailors are sometimes used as a character archetype. Since the late 2000s, several maritime museums in the U.S. and Canada have hosted exhibits about the history of sailor tattoos and their influence on popular tattoo styles.

== History ==
=== Origin ===
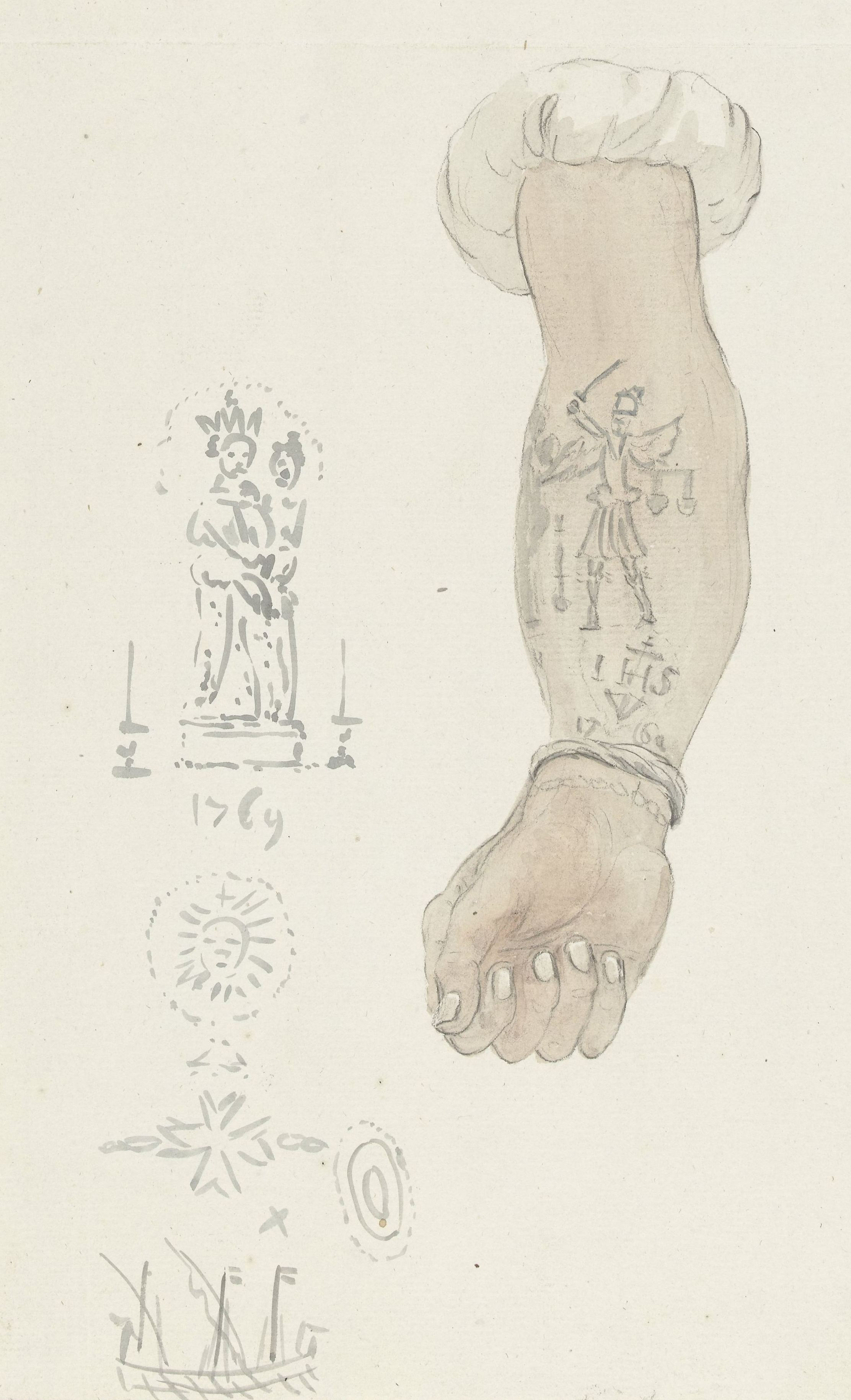
"Figures printed on the arms of our Tarentine sailors" from Voyage en Italie, en Sicile et à Malte, 1778 by Louis Ducros

Tattooing among European sailors likely derived in part from an indigenous European tattooing tradition, reinvigorated by cultural exchange during the Age of Discovery. While tattoo, from the Polynesian root "tatau", only entered English and other European languages in the late 18th century, European sailors have practiced tattooing since at least the 16th century.

We should be wrong to suppose that tattooing is peculiar to nations half-savage; we see it practised by civilized Europeans; from time immemorial, the sailors of the Mediterranean, the Catalans, French, Italians, and Maltese, have known this custom, and the means of drawing on their skin, indelible figures of crucifixes, Madonas [sic], &c. or of writing on it their own name and that of their mistress.

— Charles Pierre Claret de Fleurieu, Voyage autour du monde (1798)

According to ethnographer Joanna White, the development of an "identifiable tattooing tradition" among sailors may be an extension of their "choice of social self-demarcation through distinctive dress and accessories." Maritime historian Ira Dye said that the sailor was proud of his profession and "wanted people to know that he went to sea." Tattoos are also practical: they help to identify the body of a drowned sailor.

=== 18th century ===
Sailors in Britain and its colonies circa 1700–1750 used ink or gunpowder to create tattoos by pricking the skin and rubbing the powder into the wound. For example, in the 1720s–1730s in Virginia and Maryland, there were multiple mentions in newspapers of sailors who had blue markings on their arms, including initials and crucifixes, made with gunpowder. By 1740, seamen were recognizable at a glance by their distinctive dress and tattoos.

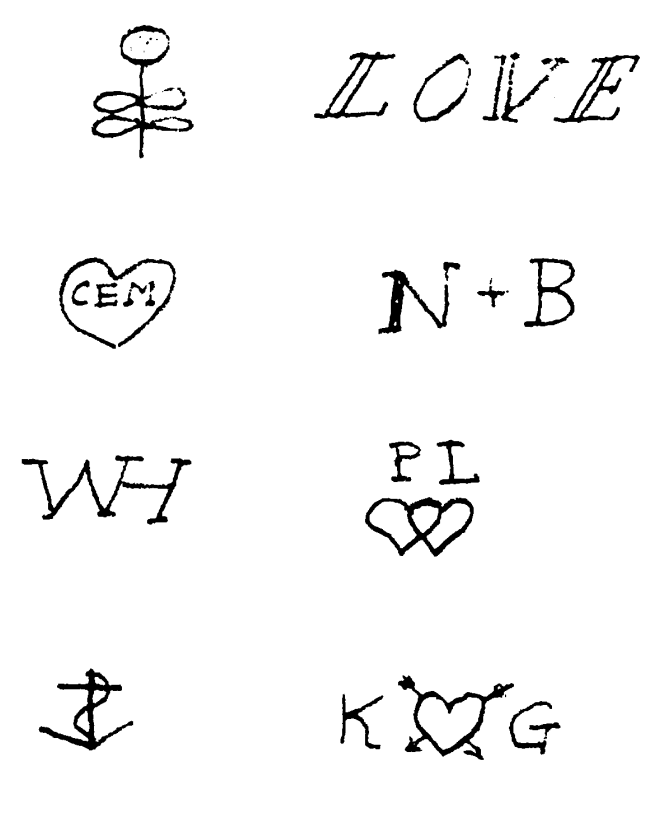
Tattoos, including initials, hearts, and an anchor, recorded in protection papers around 1796–1818

There is a persistent myth that tattoos on European sailors originated with Captain James Cook's crew, who were tattooed in Tahiti in 1769, but Cook brought only the word tattoo to Europeans, not the practice itself. Ira Dye wrote that "the tattooing of American (and by strong inference, European) seafarers was a common and well-established practice at the time of Cook's voyages." Scholars debate whether Cook's voyages increased the popularity of tattooing among sailors, or whether the rise of print culture and surveillance-based recordkeeping that happened around the same time made tattoos more visible in the historical record.

The U.S. Naval History and Heritage Command says that "by the late 18th century, around a third of British and a fifth of American sailors had at least one tattoo." (Note: "The records for 1796–1803 show 20.6 percent of all American seamen applying for Protection Certificates at that time to have been tattooed.") Following the American Revolution (1765–1783), American sailors' tattoos were listed in their protection papers, an identity certificate issued to prevent impressment into the British Royal Navy. The details in these protection papers are an important source of information about tattoo practices at the time. After the 1789 mutiny on the Bounty, in the Royal Navy, lieutenant William Bligh wrote letters about 25 mutineers to help capture them and described tattoos on 21 of them. They had European-American tattoos, such as hearts, stars, dates, initials, and a triskelion, as well as Tahitian tattoos.

=== 19th century ===
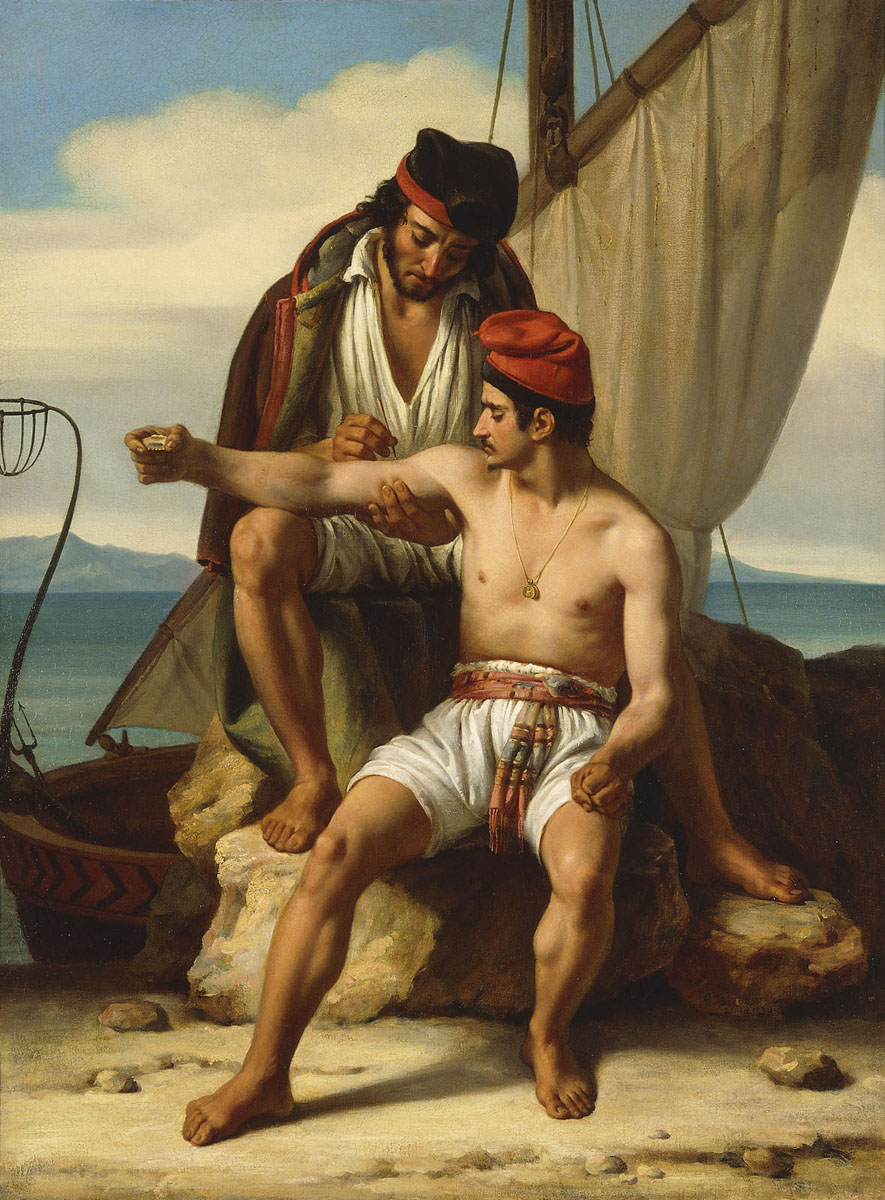
Le tatouage du matelot by Constantin Jean Marie Prevost, 1830

Sailor tattoo motifs had already solidified by the early 19th century, with anchors, ships, and other nautical symbols being the most common images tattooed on American seafarers, followed by patriotic symbols such as flags, eagles, and stars; symbols of love; and religious symbols. Sailors used similar motifs from their visual culture in other crafts at sea, such as engraving tobacco tins, scrimshaw, and coins.

Sailors were skilled with sewing needles for making and repairing sails and their clothes, and they repurposed needles for tattooing with simple inks made from soot or gunpowder. They also used India ink. Some sailors brought kits of needles and inks aboard ship to tattoo each other at sea. Herman Melville, who served in the U.S. Navy in 1843–1844, recounts:

Others [of my shipmates] excelled in tattooing, or pricking, as it is called in a man-of-war. Of these prickers, two had long been celebrated, in their way, as consummate masters of the art. Each had a small box full of tools and coloring matter; and they charged so high for their services, that at the end of the cruise they were supposed to have cleared upward of four hundred dollars. They would prick you to order a palm-tree, an anchor, a crucifix, a lady, a lion, an eagle, or any thing else you might want.

— White-Jacket; or, The World in a Man-of-War (1850)

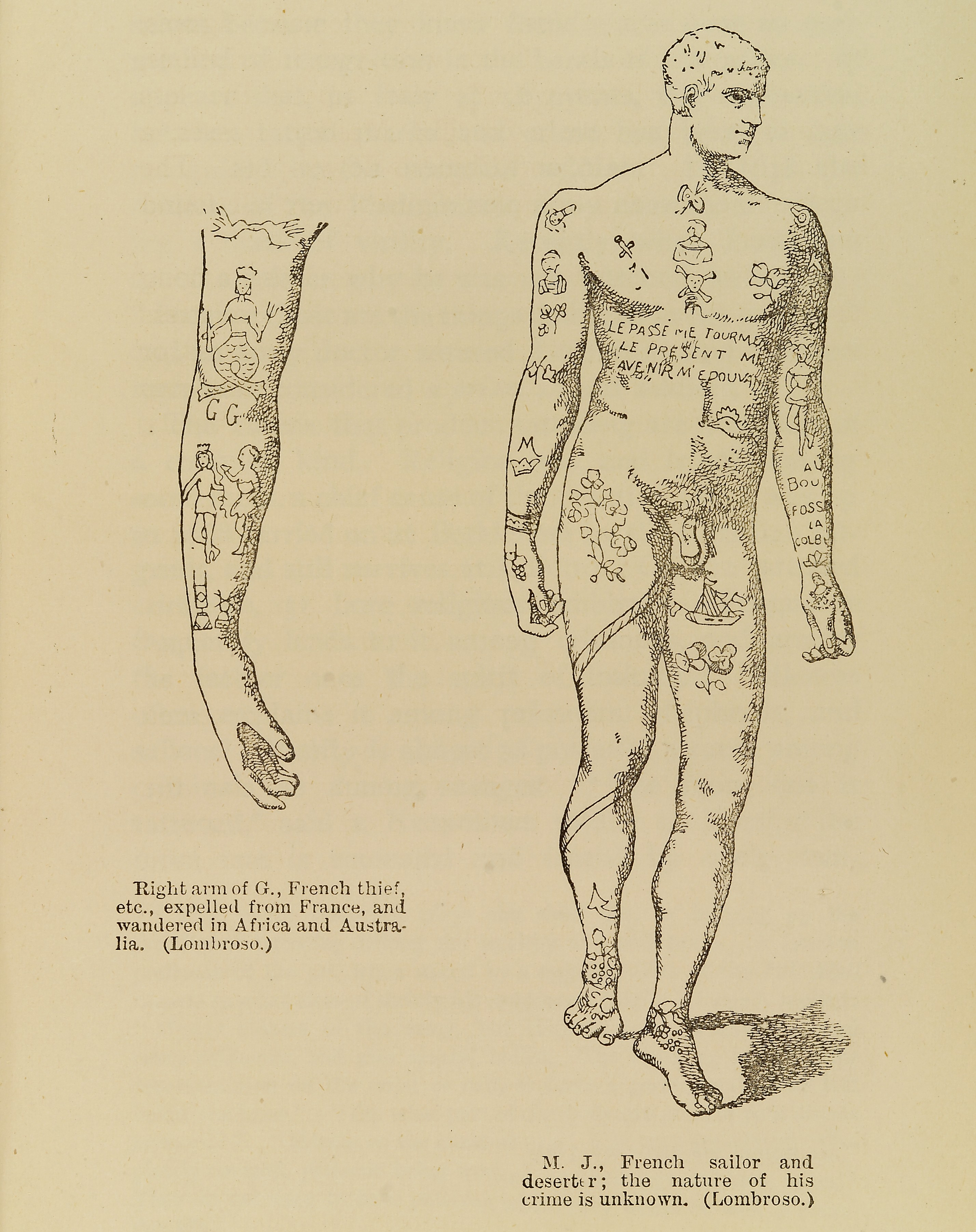
"French sailor and deserter" (Note: This may be a composite image that does not depict a specific individual.) (right) from The Criminal by Havelock Ellis, 1890; first printed by Cesare Lombroso, 1888

A letter from a sailor serving aboard the USS Monitor during the American Civil War described his "old salt" shipmates as significantly tattooed:

I wish you could see the body's of some of these old saylors: they are regular Picture Books. [They] have India Ink pricked all over their body. One has a Snake coiled around his leg, some have splendid done pieces of Coats of Arms of states, American Flags, and most all have the Crusifiction [sic] of Christ on some part of their body."

— George Geer, May 24, 1862

Personnel records from the USS Adams from 1884 to 1889 show that 18% of its crew had tattoos. Rates of tattooing varied between the occupational groups aboard the ship, with 29% of men who actually sailed the ship having tattoos, compared with only 4% of men who provided specialized services, such as apothecaries and carpenters.

Historian Jane Caplan said that while French and Italian criminologists linked tattoos to criminality, tattooing was "sufficiently normalized that it attracted virtually no official or scholarly attention" among British criminologists. By the late 19th century, tattoos were common among officers as well as enlisted men in the Royal Navy, whereas tattoos among French and Italian officers were less common. While serving in the Royal Navy, Princes George and Albert Victor acquired tattoos in Japan in 1881. American naval officers were also tattooed, some by Japanese tattoo artists, who had a reputation for finer work than ship's tattooers.

In the late 19th century, tattooing among sailors began to shift from a pastime on ships to professional shops in port cities, including in sailortown districts. In the early 1870s, Martin Hildebrandt, who had learned tattooing from a fellow sailor in the U.S. Navy, opened one of the first tattoo parlors in the United States. In 1884, Danish tattoo artist Hans J. Hansen opened the first tattoo shop in Copenhagen's Nyhavn waterfront district for sailors seeking tattoos. The development of electric tattoo machines in the 1890s enabled faster and more precise tattooing. To fulfill increased demand for tattoos, artists began to buy and sell sets of pre-drawn designs (flash), especially simple designs with black outlines and limited colors, to enable quick work.

=== 20th century ===
==== Early 20th century ====
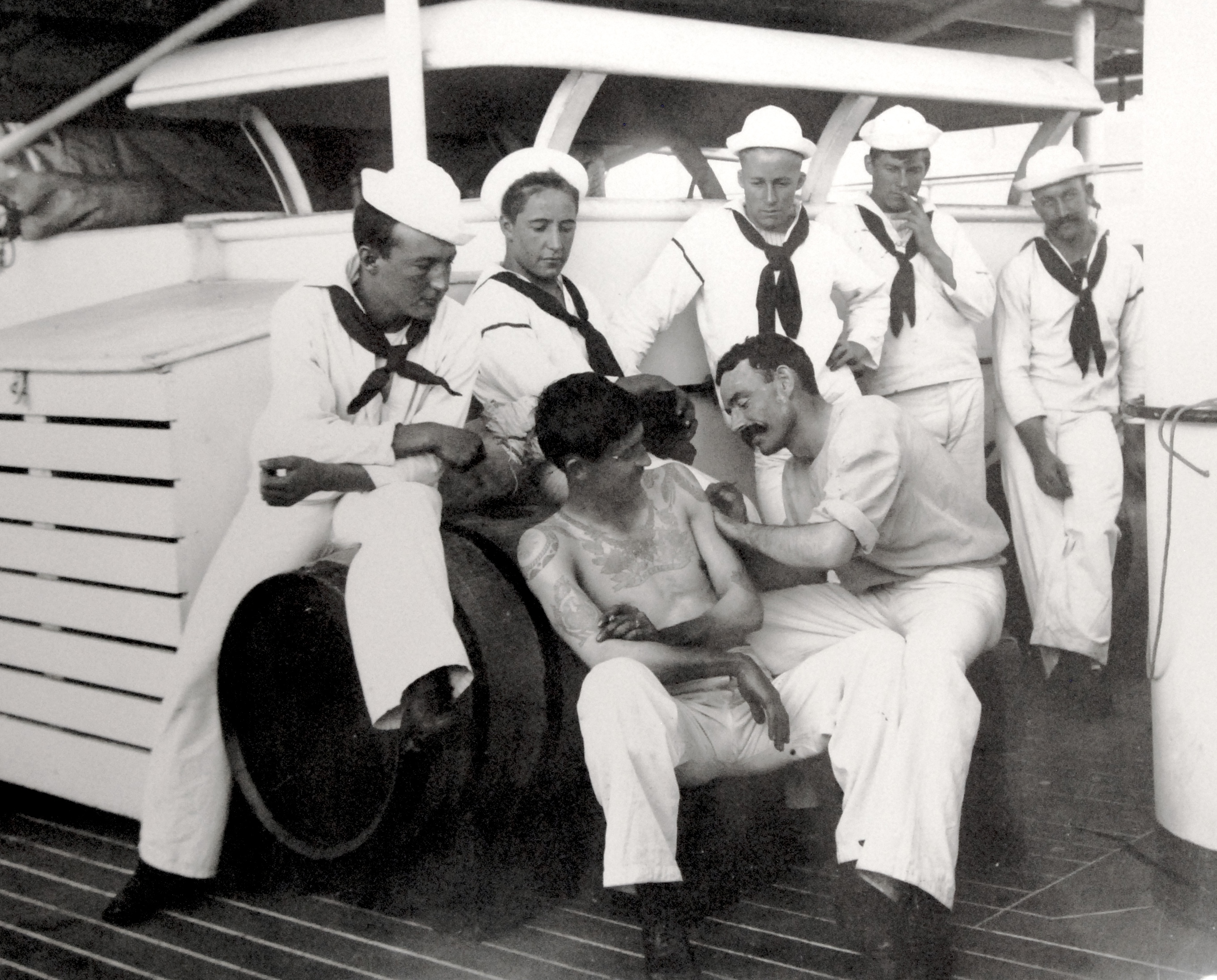
Tattooing by hand on USS Olympia, c. 1899

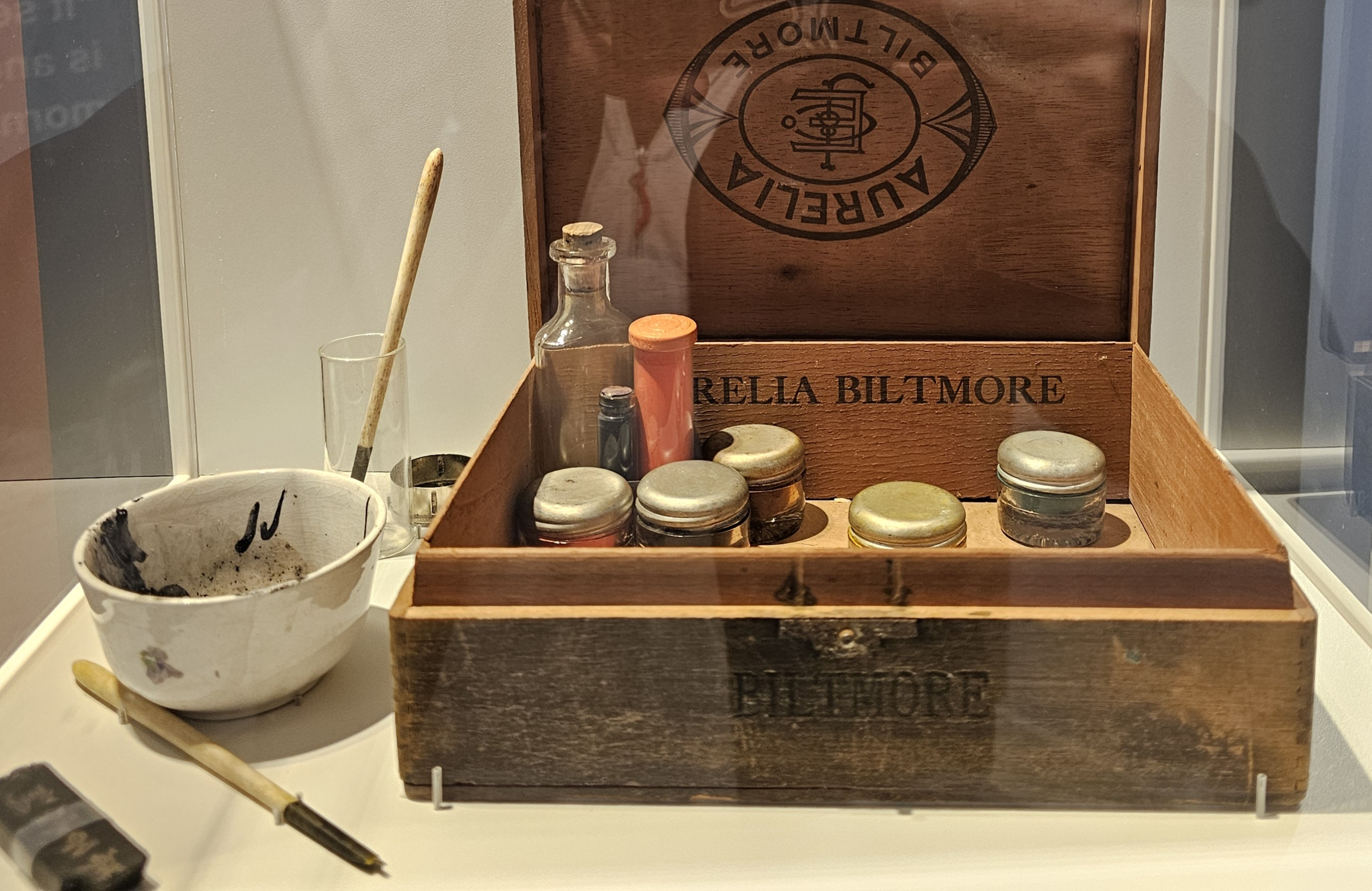
Kit used by a U.S. Navy sailor for his side business tattooing shipmates while serving between 1901 and 1906

In records from 1900–1908, among the more than 3,500 sailors who passed through the USS Independence, 23% of first-time enlistees in the United States Navy were already tattooed, and an estimated 60% of "old timers" (sailors who had served more than ten years) had at least one tattoo. The common images were, in order of popularity: coats of arms, flags, anchors, eagles and birds, stars, female figures, ships, clasped hands, daggers, crosses, bracelets, and hearts. Comparative records show that sailors acquired tattoos more frequently than Marines or soldiers. In 1908, anthropologist A. T. Sinclair, who examined "many hundreds" of sailors, reported that 90% of American man-of-war men and deep-water sailors were tattooed, along with slightly smaller majorities of merchant marines and sailors on coastal trading vessels, compared with only 10% of New England fishermen. Sinclair reported that 90% of "Scandinavian (Sweden, Norway, and Denmark) deep-water sailors" were tattooed, whereas "other Scandinavians never use the practice."

Some sailors and service members became professional tattoo artists. Amund Dietzel learned to tattoo as a sailor on Norwegian merchant ships in about 1905–1906. Dietzel opened a tattoo shop in the United States in 1913 or 1914 and became an influential tattoo artist who worked on many sailors and soldiers. England had prominent tattoo artists in the early 1900s, including George Burchett, Sutherland Macdonald, and Tom Riley, who had served in the Royal Navy or British Army. In Germany, Christian Warlich, who said he had gone to sea as a young man, started tattooing in the port city of Hamburg in about 1919.

By 1906, the U.S. Navy discouraged certain tattoos among recruits: "Indecent or obscene tattooed designs are causes of rejection, but the applicant should be given an opportunity to alter the design." During World War I, to avoid being disqualified from service, sailors sometimes had a tattoo artist "dress" their tattoos of nude women. By the early 1920s, the Navy discouraged tattoos in general. Between the late 1910s and early 1930s, some tattoo artists complained that newer sailors were getting fewer tattoos, possibly due to being less superstitious than old sailors or considering patriotic tattoos old-fashioned. The Great Depression also reduced demand for tattoos among sailors. In 1936, the Mariners' Museum and Park in Norfolk, Virginia, acquired materials from tattoo artist August "Cap" Coleman with the intent to preserve a maritime art that seemed to be dying out.

King Frederik IX of Denmark acquired several tattoos during his service in the Royal Danish Navy, including dragons during travels in Asia around 1930.

==== World War II ====
Gunner's mate in 1944 with tattoos commemorating service on USS Vincennes (CA-44) and shipmates lost in the Battle of Savo Island

A study of Honolulu, Hawaii, in 1943 found that 65% of customers visiting the city's tattoo shops were non-commissioned Navy personnel, 25% were enlisted Army personnel, and the remaining 10% were defense workers. All of the shops used electrical tattooing machines. Sailors continued to use tattoos as permanent identification: according to the study, Social Security number or service number tattoos were available for $1.50 (equivalent to $28 in 2025).

In Halifax, Nova Scotia, members of the Royal Canadian Navy and Canadian Merchant Navy frequented tattoo shops, where the traditional designs of "A Sailor's Grave" (a sinking ship) and "Death before Dishonour" (a skull pierced by a knife) were popular, along with patriotic images and pigs ("a pig on the knee means safety at sea").

==== Growth in popularity among non-sailors ====
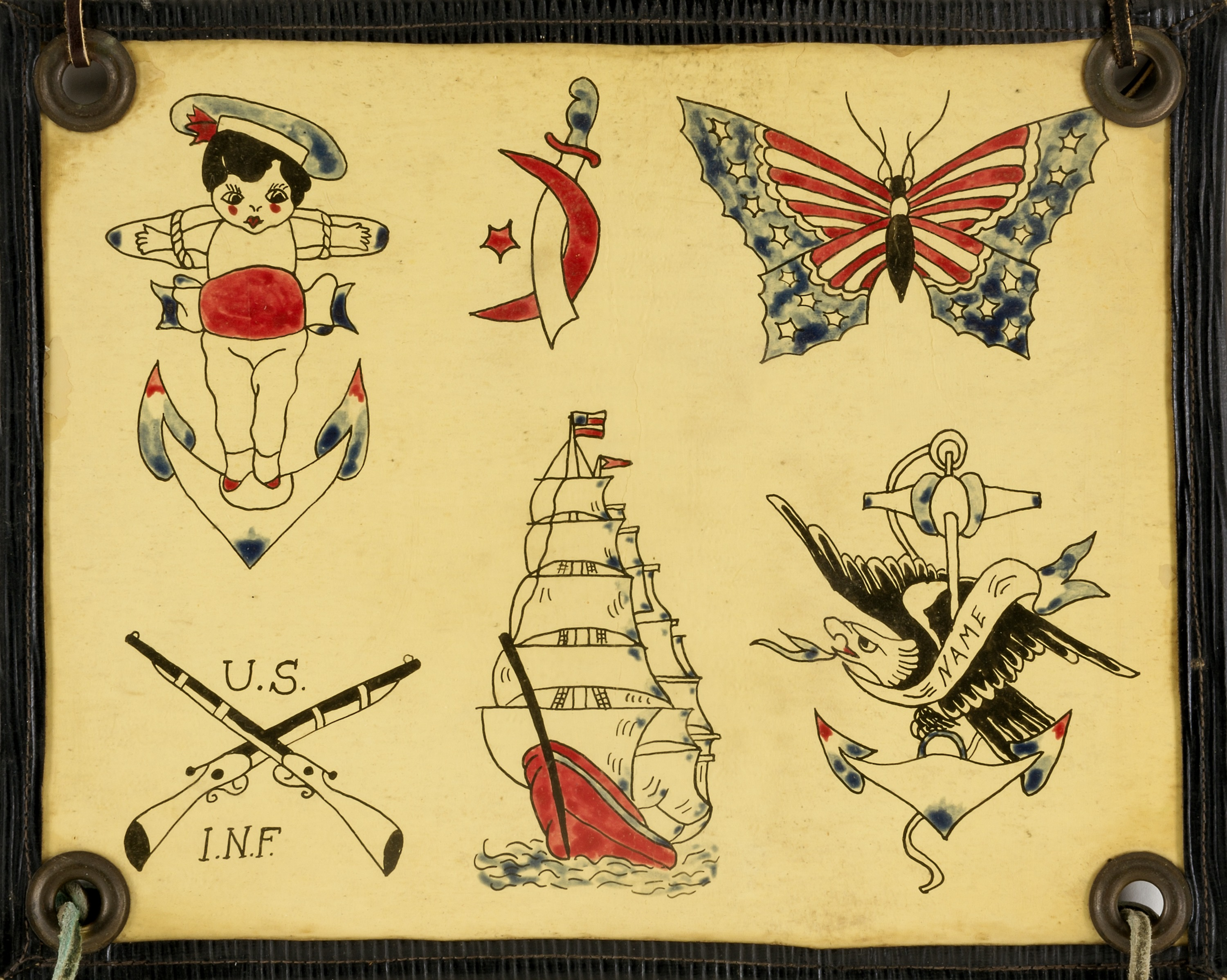
Patriotic flash, 20th century

By the 1920s–1930s, American artists including Lew Alberts, Cap Coleman, and Milton Zeis developed and sold large quantities of American traditional flash to tattoo artists serving military service members and the general public, including many maritime-inspired motifs inked in black lines with a limited color palette. This style was further popularized in subsequent decades through the work of prolific tattoo artists such as Norman Collins (known as Sailor Jerry) in Honolulu and Lyle Tuttle in San Francisco. In particular, Collins reworked 1920s–1930s designs with influences from Japanese tattoo artists, creating stylized images that appealed to a wider audience in the 1950s–1960s. The diffusion of sailor tattoos to a wider audience was also happening in Canada during those decades: tattoo artists working in port cities and near Navy bases reported that, in the 1950s–1960s, while they mostly served sailors, they also had other customers who wanted sailor-style tattoos. At the same time, a Time article in 1953 said:

Since World War I, tattooing has steadily declined. It is too conservative, for one thing, holding to such dull, outmoded motifs as Mickey Mouse, foul anchors, and bathing belles of yesteryear. Ebensten laments: "No atom bomb explodes on any lusty chest."

==== Decline and revival in the 1990s ====
By the early 1990s, interest in sailor tattoos had waned among sailors and non-sailors alike. In 1995, artists at Bert Grimm's tattoo studio in Long Beach, California, near the Long Beach Naval Shipyard that was scheduled to close in 1997, spoke about a decline in customers: fewer sailors seemed interested in getting traditional tattoos that marked them as Navy "lifers", and the Navy was discouraging tattoos.

Despite a general decline in interest, the "old school" style had remained popular among tattoo artists, and in the 1990s and 2000s, artists such as Don Ed Hardy promoted a revival. Hardy had been trained by a tattoo artist, Samuel Steward, who learned from Amund Dietzel and had some of Dietzel's flash in his shop. In 1995, Hardy published a book that supported renewed interest in older designs, Flash from the Past: Classic American Tattoo Designs 1890–1965. In 1999, Hardy, Steven Grasse, and Michael Malone started Sailor Jerry Ltd. to use Collins' flash designs on products including Sailor Jerry Rum. Hardy's own tattoo designs blended American and Japanese traditional styles. Hardy started licensing his tattoo-inspired art for a line of clothing in the early 2000s (2000s in fashion § Ed Hardy), and subsequently many other products have been sold under his brand. This themed merchandise contributed to the popularity of American traditional tattoos among the general public.

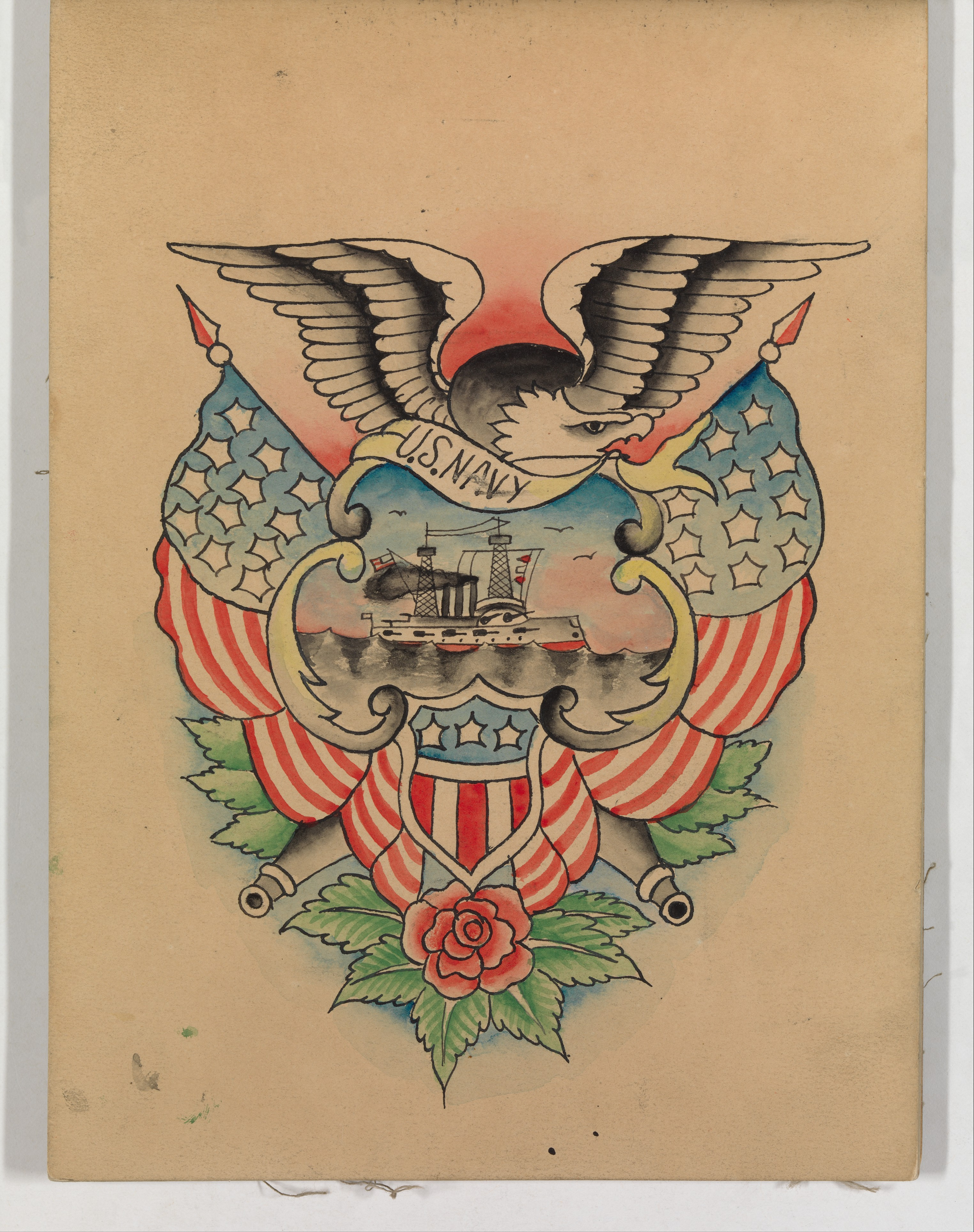
Flash c. 1900–1945

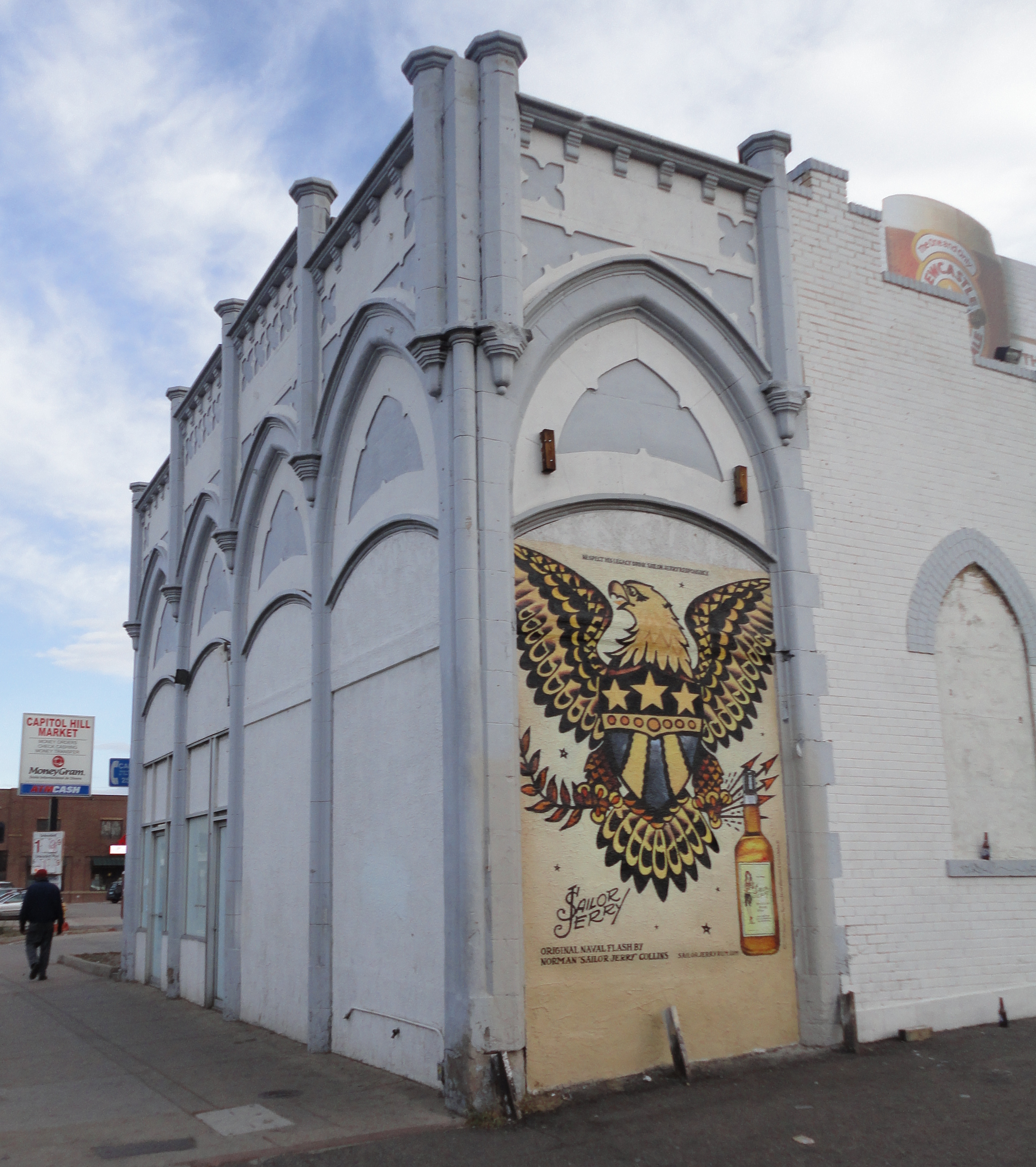
Ad for Sailor Jerry Rum in 2010

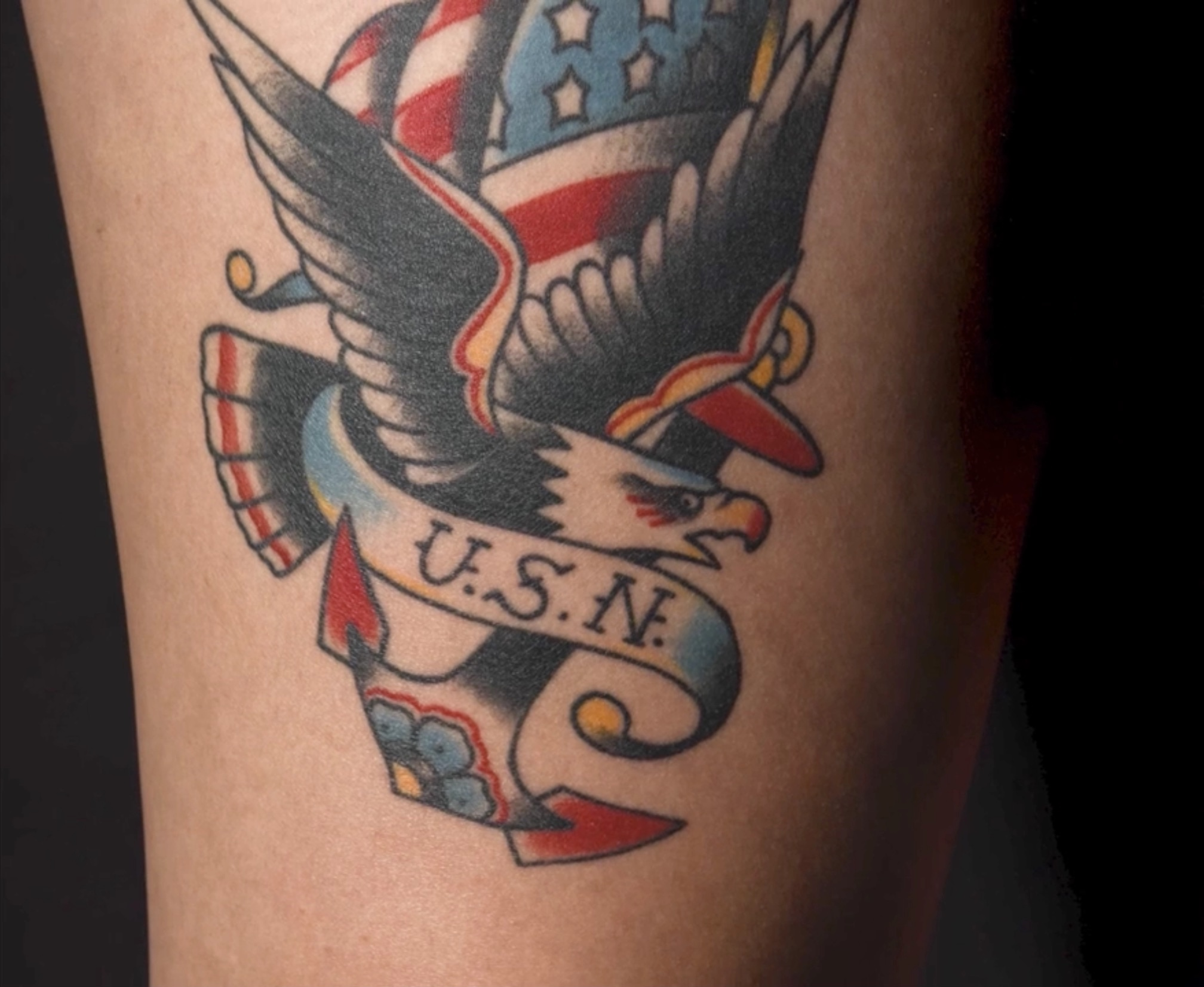
Traditional motif on a sailor in 2019

=== 21st century ===
==== Seafarers ====
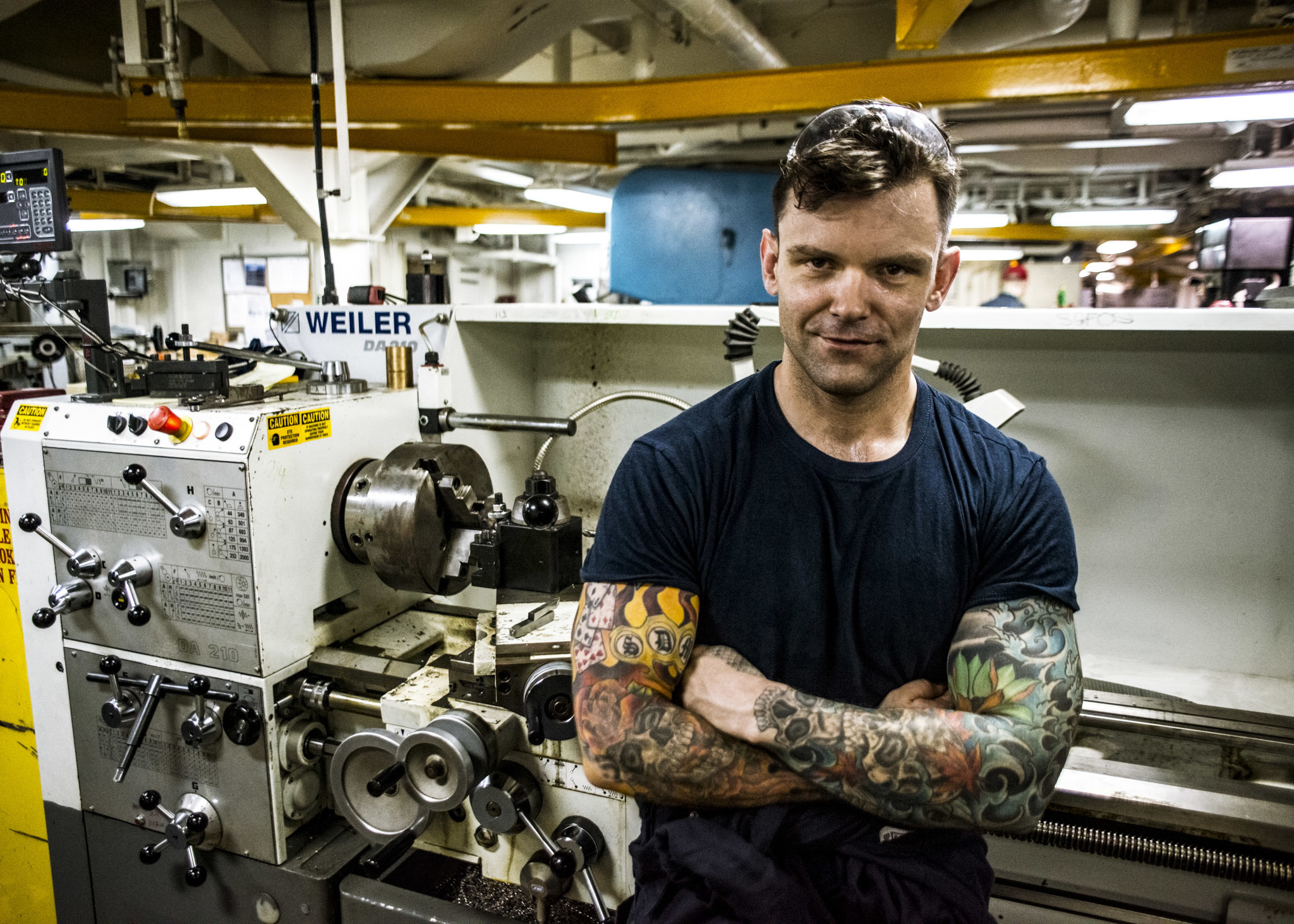
Machinery repairman in 2016: "A lot of unique experiences come with being a service member and our stories become complex at times. With tattoos we are able to record those experiences with a time-honored tradition."

Tattoos remain popular with U.S. sea service members and other seafarers, such as crew on ocean research vessels. In 2016, the U.S. Navy liberalized its tattoo policies, allowing sailors to have tattoos below the knee and on the forearms and hands, as well as tattoos up to 1 inch (25 mm) by 1 inch on the neck, including behind the ear. Sailors with visible tattoos became eligible for recruiting duty and training recruits at boot camp. The U.S. Coast Guard changed its policies in 2016 and 2019 to allow arm and hand tattoos, respectively, with the aim of supporting recruitment efforts. In 2020, the U.S. Navy considered opening tattoo parlors on bases as part of Navy Exchange shops and services.

Like in the U.S., military tattoo policies and cultural practices influence tattoo choices among seafarers in other countries. Sailors in the Royal Australian Navy have incorporated symbolic tattoos as part of their traditions. In 2017, the Royal New Zealand Navy gave its first approval to an active sailor to receive a traditional Māori tā moko; since then, more people have received moko while in Navy service. Norwegian tattoo artist and historian Tor Ola Svennevig published a book in 2013, Norske sjømannstatoveringer (Norwegian Sailors' Tattoos), with photos of and stories about older Norwegian sailors with tattoos.

==== General population ====
In the 2010s, "retro" sailor-style tattoos continued to be popular. One tattoo artist in London said, "People don't want the tattoos their dad had, they want the tattoos their granddad had", referring to crests and traditional sailor motifs from the 1940s–1950s. Regarding the practice of modern people getting new tattoos of old flash designs, many of which are derived from sailor motifs, art historian Matt Lodder wrote:

To tattoo a tall ship on a sailor in 1920 was a reasonable, and perhaps inevitable undertaking; to tattoo such a ship on a millennial suburbanite is, like Menard's Quixote, 'almost infinitely richer'; though identical in form it is buoyed by several centuries of accumulated cultural resonance, to which the very act of repetition only adds.

== Traditional designs ==
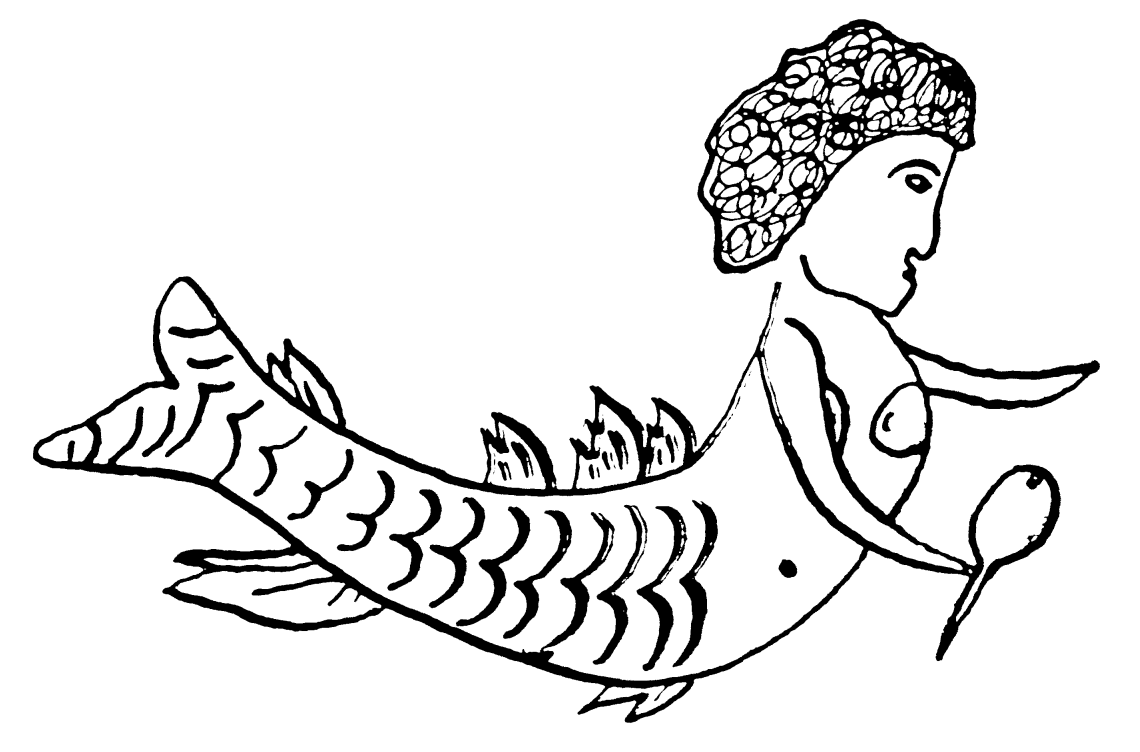
A sailor's tattoo of a mermaid holding a mirror from 1808

Matt Lodder says that "tattooing largely reflects the visual culture from which it emerges", including tattoos chosen by Western sailors. Protection papers for American seafarers between 1796 and 1818 provide an important source of information about tattoo designs. Along with the United States coat of arms, Masonic lodge symbols, hearts, and religious symbols, nautical images were popular: anchors, mermaids, fish, whales, ships, the mariner's compass, and the carpenter's axe and adze. Anchors on the backs of the hands were especially common. Sailors frequently wore the names and initials of themselves and their loved ones. Crucifixes and other Christian religious motifs were also common tattoos for sea service members, including with the intent of ensuring a Christian burial if they died away from home.

=== Superstitions ===
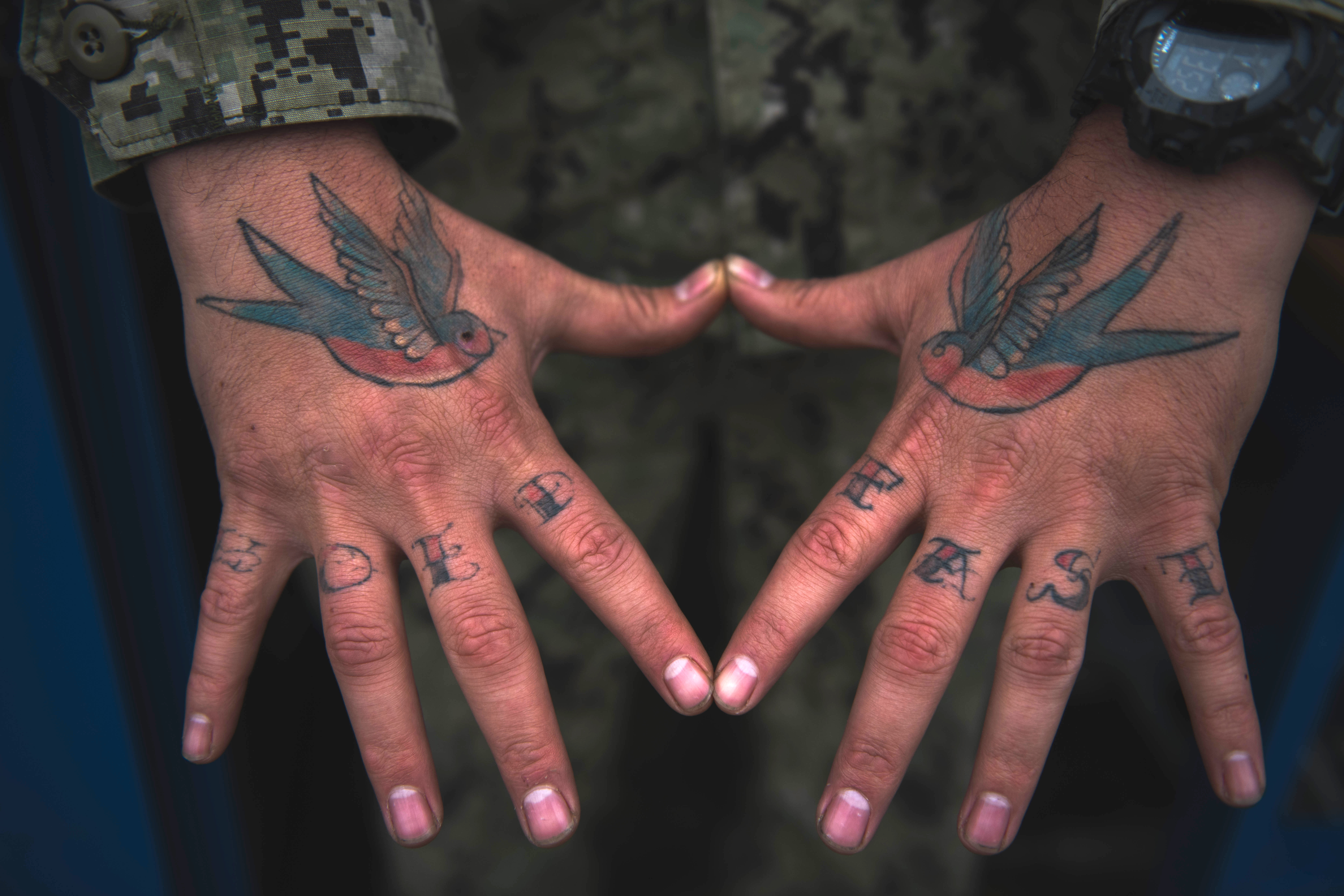
Seabee with "Hold Fast" and swallow tattoos in 2020

Claims that particular designs reflect long-held sailors' superstitions, including certain symbols as lucky talismans, have circulated since at least the 1930s. It is not clear how old some of these traditions are, as the associated designs do not show up in the surviving protection papers from 1796–1818. In 1850, Herman Melville recorded that crosses on the feet were meant to prevent shark attacks if a sailor went overboard. In a superstition noted in 1908 as common among older sailors, (Note: In an article by a US Navy surgeon, describing tattoos encountered 1900–1908: "pig on dorsum of foot, which among the older men was supposed to shield its possessor from death by drowning.") a pig and a chicken, tattooed on each foot (pig on the left, chicken on the right), protected against drowning in a shipwreck. "Hold Fast" across the knuckles was described in 1911 as "worn by English sailormen since the words were coined" to prevent falling from the masts or rigging. Historian B. R. Burg did not find evidence of tattooed pigs on feet or "Hold Fast" in records of 310 U.S. Navy sailors who served in 1885–1889. Another claim is that sailors believed that a nautical star or compass rose would help them find their way back to port; Sailor Jerry popularized a version of the star in red and black.

=== Experiences and achievements ===
In an influential book about tattoos in 1933, historian Albert Parry reported that he was told "certain devices adorning sailors' bodies used to have a special significance...the observance of which was rigidly adhered to". This included: "an anchor signified that the wearer had made a cruise on the Atlantic Ocean, a full-rigged ship that the sailor had sailed around Cape Horn, and a dragon that the wearer had actually been on the China station." Tattoo artist Samuel Steward said that Parry published stories without verification, although he considered Parry's work largely sound. B.R. Burg did not find records of tattooed dragons among U.S. Navy sailors earlier than shortly before World War I.

Tattoo artist Doc Webb said in 1985 that sailors could get a bluebird tattoo after traveling 5,000 nautical miles (9,260 km), and a second for traveling 10,000 nautical miles (18,520 km), on either side of the chest. A 1974 book described a similar tradition with a swallow or bluebird at the base of each thumb. Webb also said that a sailor may get a tattoo after a line-crossing ceremony, such as a shellback or King Neptune tattoo to reflect crossing the equator, or a golden dragon to mark crossing the International Date Line (Domain of the Golden Dragon). Sailors have come up with more variations, such as a golden shellback turtle to represent having crossed the equator and international date line at the same time.

There are many more stories told about tattoos that reflect work at sea, travels, and battles won and lost. Navy members may choose to wear the insignia of their rating (occupation) as a tattoo, such as crossed anchors for a boatswain's mate or crossed cannons for a gunner's mate. A deckhand may decide to get a rope tattooed around the wrist. Some sailors who served in the Pacific acquired tattoos as souvenirs from ports of call, such as in Hong Kong, Japan, and the Philippines. Influenced by their travels, some chose images of dragons and "Suzie Wong" girls. Sailors in Hawaii also picked up tattoos as souvenirs, such as Pearl Harbor memorials or hula girls.

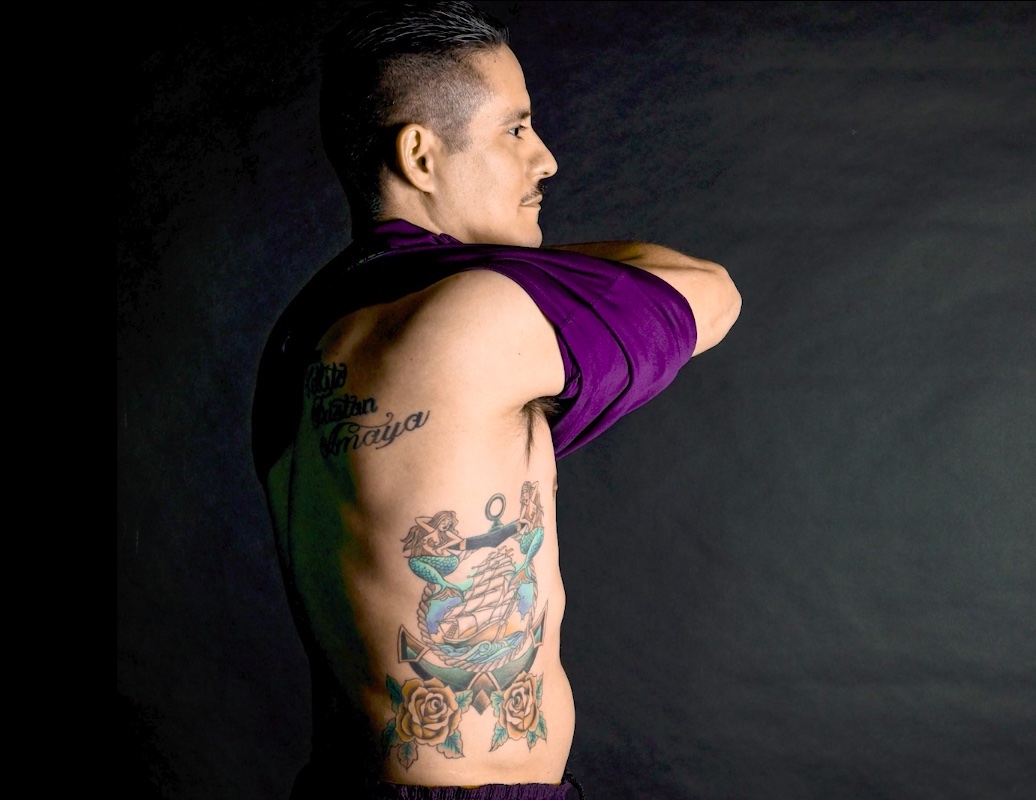
Sailor on USS Theodore Roosevelt with a tattoo including mermaids, a tall ship, and an anchor

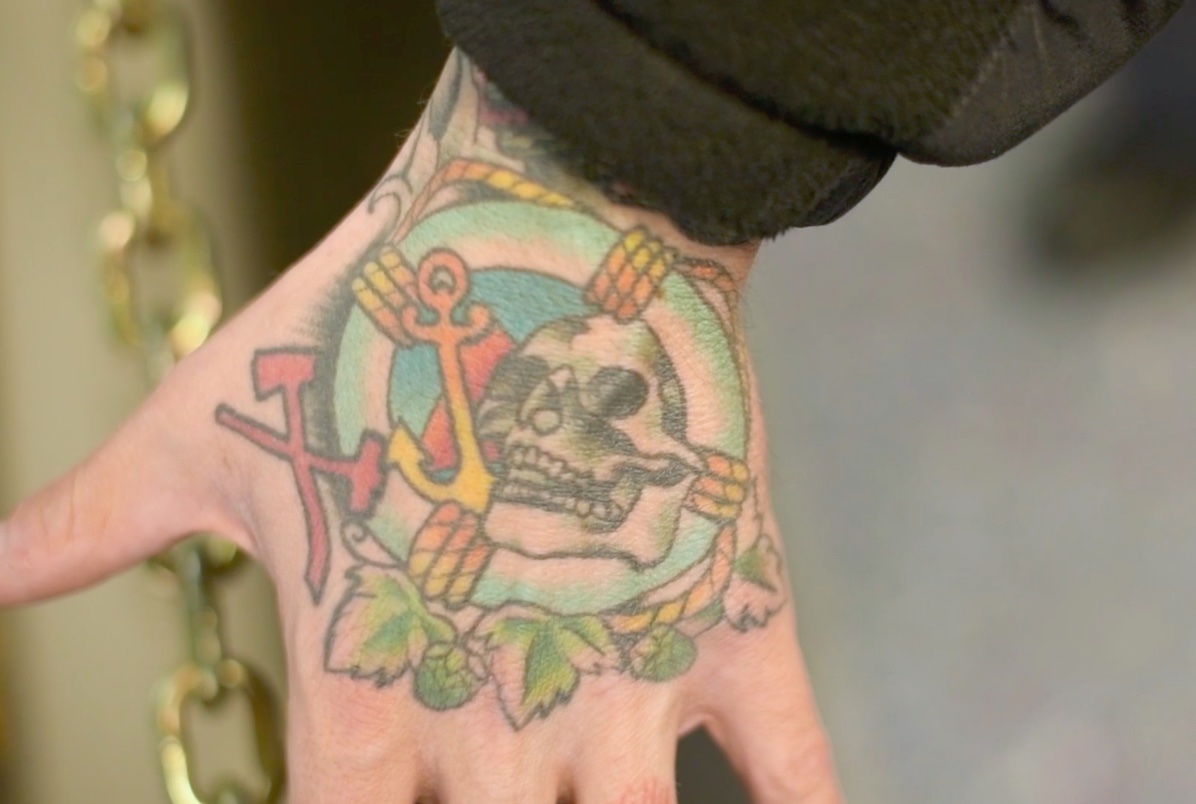
Sailor's hand with a tattoo of a skull, anchor, lifebuoy, and damage controlman insignia (axe and maul)

== Representations in media ==
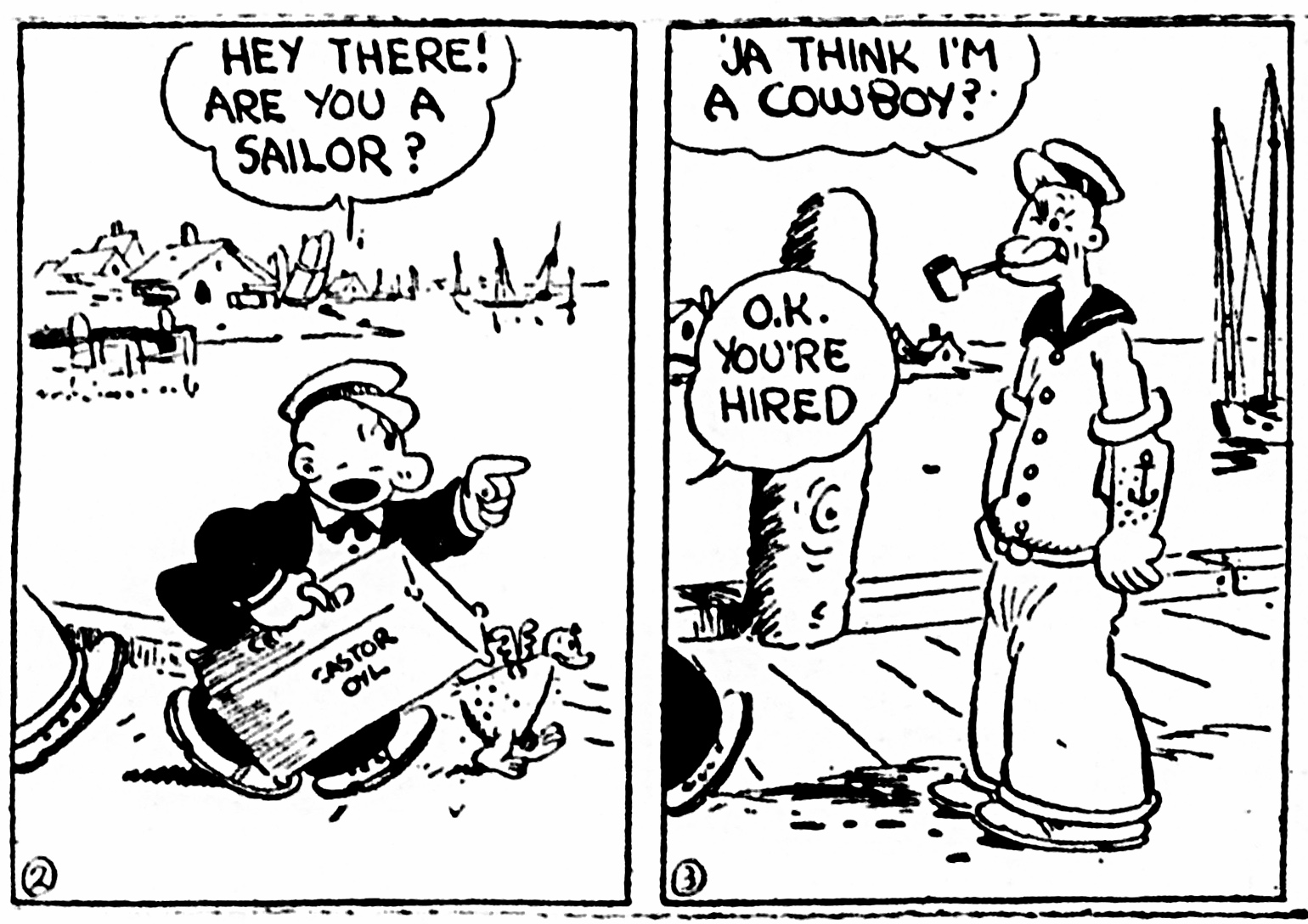
Excerpt from first appearance of Popeye in 1929, showing tattoo on arm

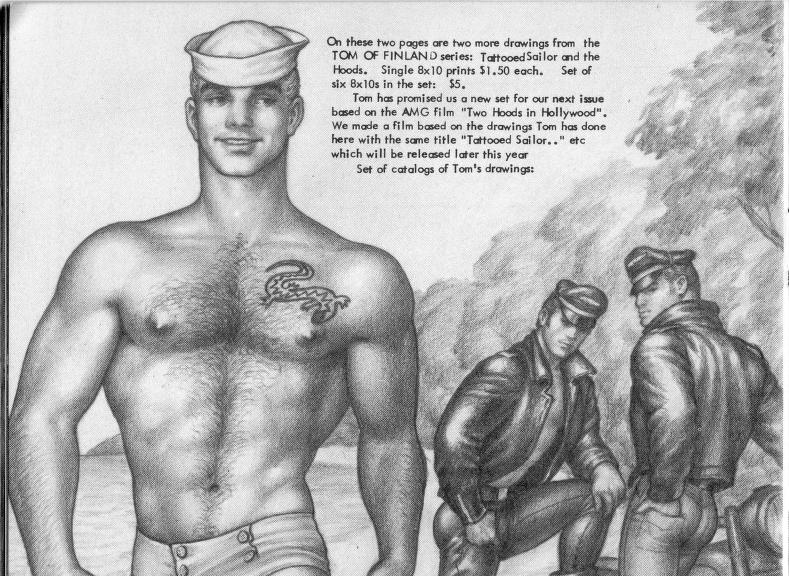
Excerpt from "Tattooed Sailor and the Hoods" by Tom of Finland, published in Physique Pictorial in 1962

Creators of literature, comics, movies, and other stories have portrayed sailor characters with tattoos as one of the distinctive signs of their profession. This is part of a larger theme of sailors, also called Jack Tars, as a kind of stock character. For example, a Nathaniel Currier lithograph shows a young sailor with a small anchor tattoo, likely printed between 1838 and 1856. (Note: Signature of "N. Currier" and address of "152 Nassau St" line up with 1838–56 according to the American Historical Print Collectors Society.) Tattooed sailors were a minor trope of Victorian literature; in A Study in Scarlet (1887), Sherlock Holmes is able to identify a retired Marine on the basis of an anchor tattoo on the back of his hand. Norman Rockwell's painting "Sailor Dreaming of Girlfriend", on the cover of the January 18, 1919 issue of The Saturday Evening Post, also shows a sailor with an anchor tattoo on the back of his hand. The 2003 historical drama film Master and Commander: The Far Side of the World, set in 1805, portrayed an older crewman with "Hold Fast" knuckle tattoos.

The tattooed sailor has been used as a humorous figure. The cartoon character Popeye the Sailor Man, who first appeared in a comic strip in 1929, has prominent anchor tattoos on his forearms. Another Rockwell painting, for the cover of the Post in March 1944, shows a tattoo artist adding a woman's name to a sailor's shoulder below several crossed-out names, among many other tattoos. With typical fidelity, Rockwell borrowed a tattoo machine to use as a reference. In the 1954 film There's No Business Like Show Business, Ethel Merman and Mitzi Gaynor cross-dress in sailor outfits and sing "A Sailor's Not a Sailor ('Til a Sailor's Been Tattooed)" to each other.

Some representations of tattooed sailors are sexual fantasies. In Tom of Finland's illustrations in the 1960s, the tattooed young sailor represented a masculine, gay archetype of sexual availability. French fashion designer Jean Paul Gaultier, influenced by Popeye and Tom of Finland, has used the stereotyped gay sailor and sailor tattoos in his work involving camp and ambiguity in gender and sexuality. Gaultier has used images of eroticized tattooed sailors to advertise Le Male, a men's fragrance, since its launch in 1995. His fragrance advertisements portray sailors with "old style" tattoos as masculine objects of male desire, with some tattoos that suggest a comic exaggeration of masculinity, while other tattoos have an element of decoration and thereby femininity.

== Museum collections and exhibits ==
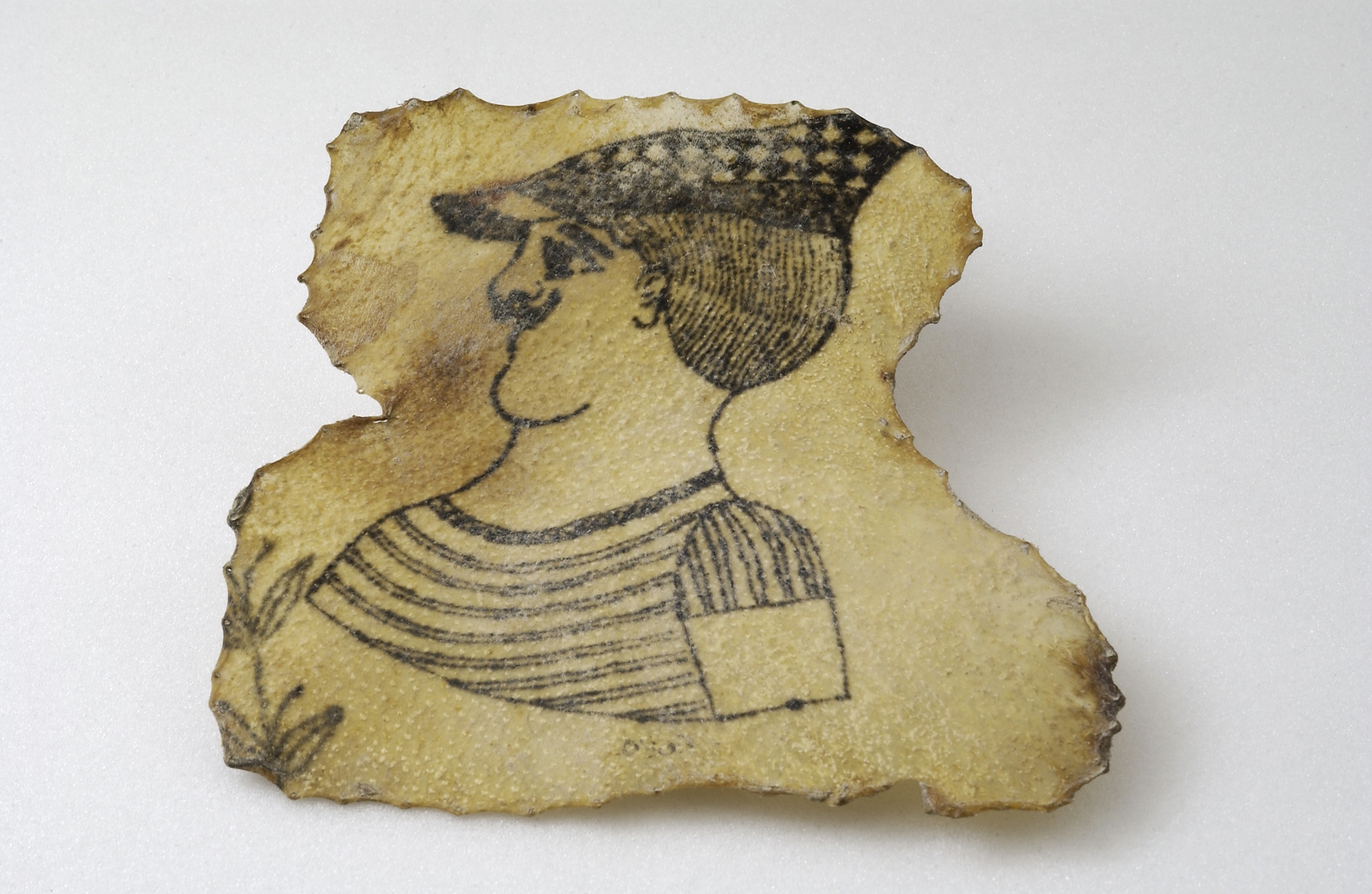
Tattoo of a French Navy sailor in a marinière c. 1830–1929, in the Wellcome Collection

The Wellcome Collection in London has approximately 300 pieces of preserved tattooed skin from between about 1830 and 1929 in France. The collection has tattoos applied by and to French army and navy service members, including military and naval motifs.

Several maritime museums have hosted temporary exhibits about the history of sailor tattoos. In 2009, the Independence Seaport Museum in Pennsylvania curated "Skin and Bones: Tattoos in the Life of the American Sailor" with material from the museum's collection as well as the Kinsey Institute and Whitney Museum of American Art. The exhibit was also shown at Mystic Seaport in 2011 and included antique flash books, tattoo tools, photographs, and other artifacts. In 2013, the Vancouver Maritime Museum collaborated with a tattoo artist to present "Tattoos and Scrimshaw: The Art of the Sailor", which displayed historic materials and contemporary photographs of U.S. Navy service members. The South Street Seaport Museum in Manhattan held an exhibit in 2017, "The Original Gus Wagner: The Maritime Roots of Modern Tattoo", with materials from its collection related to merchant seaman and tattoo artist Gus Wagner (1872–1941).

The U.S. Naval History and Heritage Command has curated related exhibits at U.S. Navy museums. In 2015, the Puget Sound Navy Museum showed "Skin Deep: The Nautical Roots of Tattoo Culture", with tattoo machines, needles, scrimshaw, stencils, and other materials, along with biographies of tattoo artists who worked in American ports. The National Museum of the American Sailor presented "Marked by the Sea: Tattoos in the U.S. Navy" in 2021, including a tattoo kit from 1899 and stories from service members and veterans.
