= Military tattoo policies =

Military restrictions on body modifications

In the military forces of many countries, ink tattoos in skin are either regulated under policies or strictly prohibited as part of dress code rules.

== Australia ==
=== Royal Australian Navy ===
In the Royal Australian Navy, the acceptability of tattoos is assessed on a case-by-case basis.

== India ==
=== Indian Army ===
The Indian Army tattoo policy has been in place since 11 May 2015. The government declared all tribal communities who enlist and have tattoos are allowed to have them all over the body only if they belong to a tribal community. Indians who are not part of a tribal community are only allowed to have tattoos in designated parts of the body such as the forearm, elbow, wrist, the side of the palm, and back and front of hands. Offensive, sexist and racist tattoos are not allowed.

== United Kingdom ==
=== Royal Navy ===
As of 2022, the Royal Navy permits most tattoos, with certain restrictions: unless visible in a front-facing passport photo, obscene or offensive, or otherwise deemed inappropriate. The National Museum of the Royal Navy has presented an exhibit about the long history of tattoos among Navy service members, part of the tradition of sailor tattoos.

== United States ==
=== United States Air Force ===
The United States Air Force regulates all kinds of body modification. Any tattoos which are deemed to be "prejudicial to good order and discipline", or "of a nature that may bring discredit upon the Air Force" are prohibited. Specifically, any tattoo which may be construed as "obscene or advocate sexual, racial, ethnic or religious discrimination" is disallowed. Tattoo removal may not be enough to qualify; resultant "excessive scarring" may be disqualifying. Further, Air Force members may not have tattoos on their neck, face, head, tongue, lips or scalp.

=== United States Army ===
The United States Army regulates tattoos under AR 670–1, last updated in 2022. Soldiers are permitted to have tattoos as long as they are not on the neck, hands, or face, with exceptions existing for of one ring tattoo on each hand, a tattoo on each hand, not exceeding one inch diameter, one tattoo behind the ear, not to exceed one inch in diameter, and permanent makeup. Additionally, tattoos that are deemed to be sexist, racist, derogatory, or extremist continue to be banned.

=== United States Coast Guard ===
The United States Coast Guard policy has changed over the years. It changed its policies in 2016 and 2019 to allow arm and hand tattoos, respectively, with the aim of supporting recruitment efforts.

Tattoos should not be visible over the collarbone or when wearing a V-neck shirt. Tattoos or military brands on the arms should not surpass the wrist. But only one hand tattoos of a form of ring are permitted when not exceeding 0.25 in (6.4 mm) width. Face tattoos are also permitted as permanent eyeliners for females as long as they are appropriately worn and not brightly colored to fit uniform dressing code. Disrespectful derogatory tattoos and sexually explicit tattoos are prohibited on the body.

=== United States Marine Corps ===
In 2016, the United States Marine Corps disclosed a new policy of standards of appearance, substituting any previous policy from the past.

The policy unauthorized tattoos in different parts of the body such as the wrist, knee, elbow and above the collar bone. Wrist tattoos should be two inches above the wrist, elbow tattoos two inches above and one inch below, and the knee two inches above and two below.

=== United States Navy ===
In 2016, the United States Navy liberalized its tattoo policies, allowing sailors to have tattoos below the knee and on the forearms and hands, as well as tattoos up to one inch by one inch on the neck, including behind the ear. Sailors are also allowed to have tattoos of any size on the arms and legs, as long as they are not deemed to be offensive tattoos. Sailors with visible tattoos became eligible for recruiting duty and training recruits at boot camp.

Tattoos in the Navy have been regulated since at least 1909, when it published restrictions on indecent and obscene tattoos.

== New Zealand ==
=== Royal New Zealand Navy ===
In 2017, the Royal New Zealand Navy gave its first approval to an active sailor to receive a traditional Māori tā moko.
