= Protection papers =

Documents formerly issued to protect American sailors

Protection papers, also known as "Seamen Protection Papers", "Seamen Protection Certificates", or "Sailor's Protection Papers", were issued to American seamen during the last part of the 18th century through the first half of the 20th century. In 1796, federal legislation regarding Seaman's Protection Certificates was enacted for merchant seamen. These papers provided a description of the sailor and showed American citizenship. They were issued to American sailors to prevent them from being impressed on British men-of-war, during the period leading to and after the War of 1812.

The certificates could be issued for a fee of 25 cents, and required proof of citizenship, although this was later changed to require only a notarized affidavit of citizenship.

Protection papers were also offered to those who remained loyal to the crown during the American Revolution. The day Richard Stockton was captured, General William Howe had written a proclamation offering protection papers and a full and free pardon to those willing to remain in peaceable obedience to the king, George III. Although many took the pardon, Stockton never did and was marched to Perth Amboy, where he was put in irons, and treated as a common criminal.

== Use as freedom papers ==
Because protection papers were used to prove American citizenship, many Black sailors also used them to show that they were freemen if they were stopped by officials or slave catchers. They also called them "free papers" because they certified their non-slave status. These protection papers often had vague descriptions of the individuals. Frederick Douglass used a "protection paper" of a free Black sailor to escape. He said:

It was the custom in the State of Maryland to require of the free colored people to have what were called free papers. This instrument they were required to renew very often, and by charging a fee for this writing, considerable sums from time to time were collected by the State. In these papers the name, age, color, height and form of the free man were described, together with any scars or other marks upon his person which could assist in his identification. This device of slaveholding ingenuity, like other devices of wickedness, in some measure defeated itself—since more than one man could be found to answer the same general description. Hence many slaves could escape by impersonating the owner of one set of papers; and this was often done as follows: A slave nearly or sufficiently answering the description set forth in the papers, would borrow or hire them till he could by their means escape to a free state, and then, by mail or otherwise, return them to the owner. The operation was a hazardous one for the lender as well as for the borrower. A failure on the part of the fugitive to send back the papers would imperil his benefactor, and the discovery of the papers in possession of the wrong man would imperil both the fugitive and his friend. It was therefore an act of supreme trust on the part of a freeman of color thus to put in jeopardy his own liberty that another might be free. It was, however, not infrequently bravely done, and was seldom discovered. I was not so fortunate as to sufficiently resemble any of my free acquaintances as to answer the description of their papers. But I had one friend—a sailor—who owned a sailor's protection, which answered somewhat the purpose of free papers—describing his person and certifying to the fact that he was a free American sailor. The instrument had at its head the American eagle, which at once gave it the appearance of an authorized document. This protection did not, when in my hands, describe its bearer very accurately. Indeed, it called for a man much darker than myself, and close examination of it would have caused my arrest at the start.

A review of many of these protection papers reveals the number of Black men who were sailors. "By 1800, about 18 percent of the one hundred thousand Americans at sea were African Americans. It is possible to trace the number of African Americans in vessels belonging to the United States (an unknown number sailed for other nations) because Seamen's Protection Certificates were drawn up for all 'citizens'—as they specified, such that blacks used them to claim citizenship they were commonly denied—so that in theory they could not be seized by other nations. The records show great statistical variations depending on the port: In Philadelphia and Baltimore, the proportions of African Americans hovered around 15 percent from 1800 to 1860. New York's percentage fell from between 14 and 18 percent annually before 1830 to between 7 and 8 percent from 1830 to 1860; that of Savannah, Georgia, dropped from around 13 percent before 1830 to under 2 percent by 1836. The proportion of black mariners in New Orleans, Louisiana, also fell from averages in the high teens before 1820 to around 10 percent in the 1830s and between 1 and 7 percent in the 1840s and 1850s."

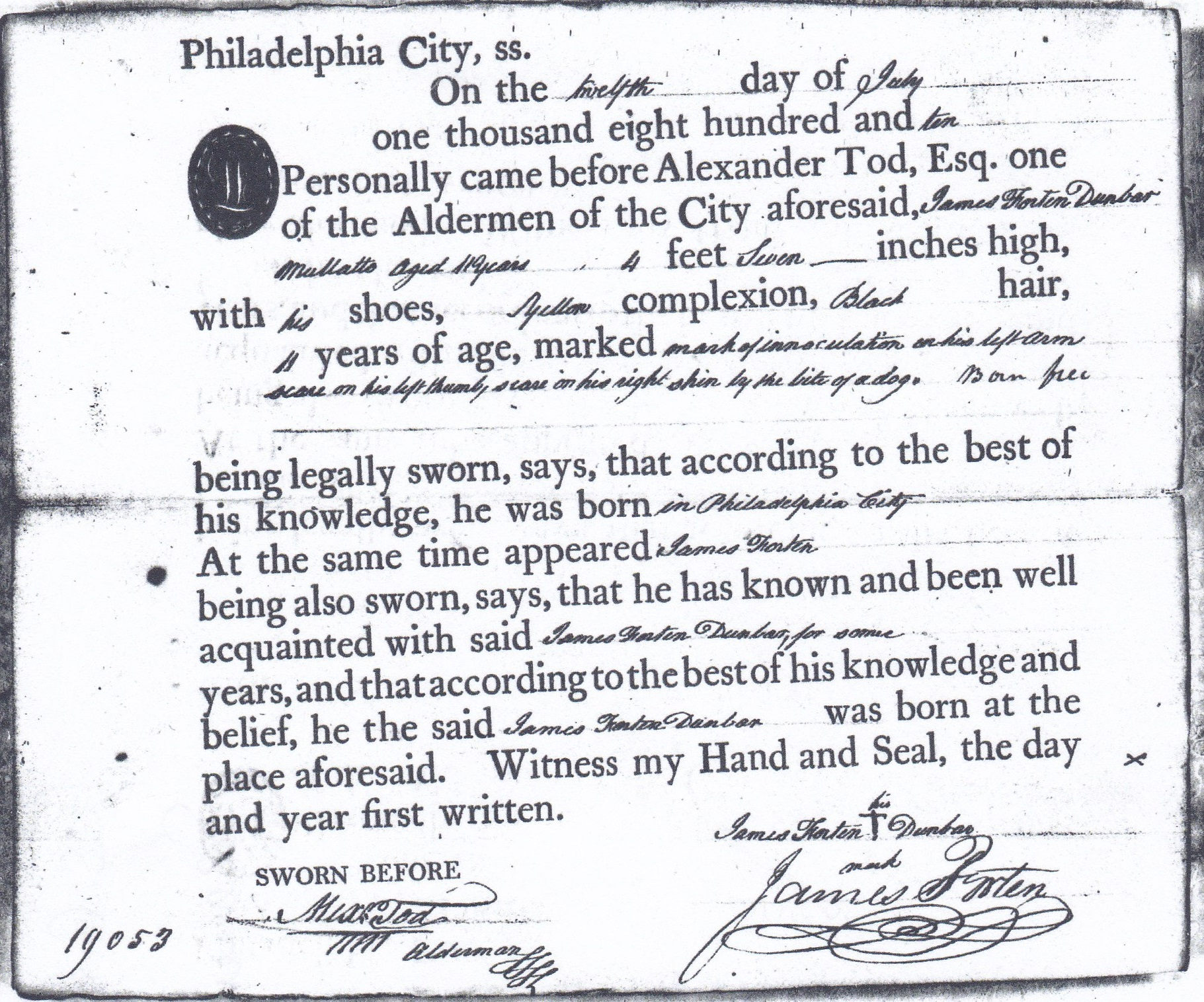
Seaman's Protection Certificate issued to James Forten Dunbar on 12 July 1810 in Philadelphia

A 12 July 1810 protection certificate issued in Philadelphia identifies the bearer as James Forten Dunbar, a "mulatto" (a person of mixed white and Black ancestry), age eleven, and height 4' 7" tall. Dunbar was described as having black hair and yellow complexion. He had a smallpox inoculation scar on his left arm, a scar on his left thumb, and on his right shin the mark of a dog bite. Dunbar was born a "free man of color" in Philadelphia, Pennsylvania, on 1 July 1799. Dunbar was the fourth and last child of William Dunbar and Abigail Forten Dunbar. His mother Abigail was the sister of African American abolitionist and sail-maker James Forten. Dunbar’s father William died young, and it was his uncle, James Forten, who signed for and made sure "Born Free" was included in the description. James Forten Dunbar attested the document by his X mark; it is unclear if he ever became fully literate. Dunbar would later spend most of his life as a sailor and sail-maker aboard merchant and naval vessels. During his long career he served aboard such naval vessels as the USS Constellation, USS Niagara, USS Brooklyn and the USS Tuscarora.

== Tattoos ==
Many of the protection certificates were so general, and it was so easy to abuse the system, that many impressment officers of the Royal Navy paid no attention to them. "In applying for a duplicate Seaman's Protection Certificate in 1817, James Francis stated that he 'had a protection granted him by the Collector of this Port on or about 12 March 1806 which was torn up and destroyed by a British Captain when at sea.'"

One way of making them more specific was to describe a tattoo, which is highly personal, and thus use that description to identify the seaman. As a result, many of the certificates carried information about tattoos and scars, as well as other specific information. This also perhaps led to an increase and proliferation of tattoos among American seamen. "Frequently their 'protection papers' made reference to tattoos, clear evidence that individual was a seafaring man; rarely did members of the general public adorn themselves with tattoos."

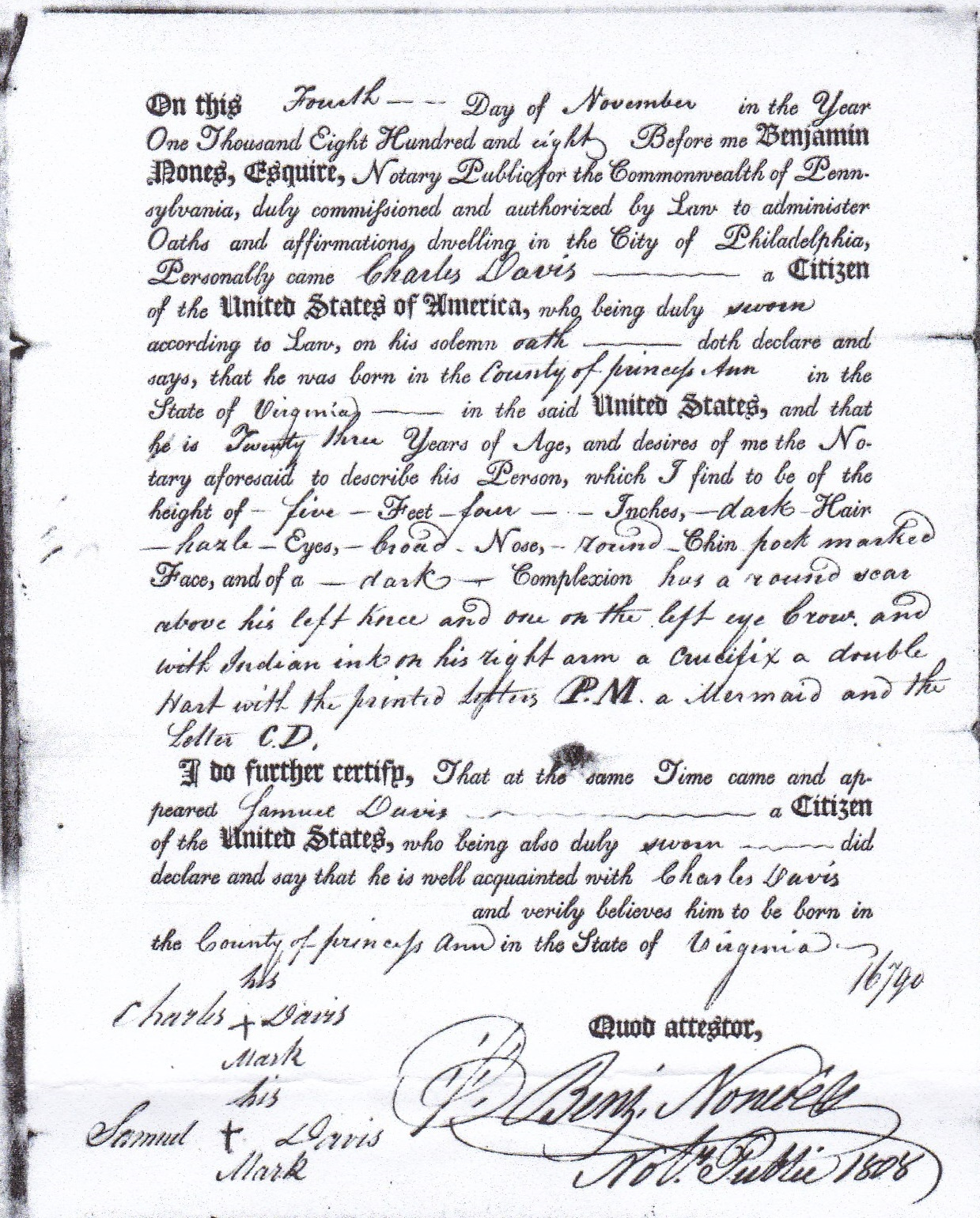
Protection certificate issued to Charles Davis on 4 November 1808, age 23, which noted that his right arm was marked in India ink with a crucifix, a double heart with the initials P.M., a mermaid, and the initials C.D.

The protection certificate issued on 4 November 1808 in Philadelphia to Charles Davis is a good example of an early certificate listing a sailor's tattoos and scars. Davis is described as a citizen of the United States, and a native of Princess Anne County, Virginia. Davis was listed as 23 years of age, five feet four inches tall, dark hair, hazel eyes, broad nose, round chin, pock-marked face, and of dark complexion. He has a round scar above his left knee and one on the left eyebrow. His tattoos are described, as are their locations on his body. He is listed as having in India ink on his right arm a crucifix, a double heart with printed letters P. M., a mermaid, and the letters C.D. Charles Davis attested this document by making his X mark, as did his witness Samuel Davis. "Among tattooed seamen the crucifix inked on Charles Davis was by far the most common religious tattoo, Davis, while illiterate, may have been a Roman Catholic who derived comfort from this symbol of salvation." Author Herman Melville while a sailor aboard the frigate USS United States (1844) was a close observer of nautical life and customs. Melville wrote, "the Roman Catholic sailors on board had at least the crucifix pricked on their arm, and for this reason. If they chanced to die in a Catholic land they would be sure of a decent burial in consecrated ground."

"In the late eighteenth and early nineteenth centuries, tattoos were as much about self-expression as they were about having a unique way to identify a sailor's body should he be lost at sea or impressed by the British navy. The best source for early American tattoos is the protection papers issued following a 1796 congressional act to safeguard American seamen from impressment. These proto-passports catalogued tattoos alongside birthmarks, scars, race, and height. Using simple techniques and tools, tattoo artists in the early republic typically worked on board ships using anything available as pigments, even gunpowder and urine. Men marked their arms and hands with initials of themselves and loved ones, significant dates, symbols of the seafaring life, liberty poles, crucifixes, and other symbols."

== Discontinuance ==
The Seamen's Protection Certificates were discontinued in the 1940s, as other forms of identification of American sailors were instituted. Several reports to the United States House of Representatives and the United States Senate demonstrated that they were no longer needed. "As the threat to American freedom on the high seas began to disappear, Protection Certificates became more valuable as identification, and they were used as such until 1940, when the Continuous Discharge Certificate replaced them. These documents are common items in maritime collections and are important research sources for an study [sic] of American seamen."

== Bibliography ==
- Computer-processed Tabulations of Data from Seamen's Protective Certificate Applications to the Collector of Customs for the Port of Philadelphia, 1812–1815. Washington: National Archives and Records Service, General Services Administration, 1976. Print. Washington: National Archives and Records Service, General Services Administration, 1976. Series: National Archives microfilm publications., Pamphlet describing; M 972. OCLC 8152551. Notes: Cover title. Records described are from Records of the Bureau of Customs, Record Group 36. Description: 9 pages; 23 cm.
- Cutler, Charles R, and Stephen Stilwell. Seamen's Protection Papers. 1828. Archival material. OCLC 76892148. Abstract: Seamen's protection papers issued to Stephen Stilwell at Providence, R.I., in 1828 and to Charles Russell Cutler at Bristol and Warren customs district of Rhode Island in 1841. Both Stilwell and Cutler became captains of whaling vessels of Warren, R.I.
- Deeben, John P. Seaman's [sic] Protection Certificates 1792–1869. Arlington, Va: National Genealogical Society, 2007. Sound recording. OCLC 156974522. Abstract: This session explores the creation and use of seamen's protection certificates as a proof of nationality, including the historical and legislative background, and demonstrates how they provide valuable personal information for modern researchers. This program was recorded at the 2007 National Genealogical Society Conference in the States, "Rediscover Virginia," held May 16–19 in Richmond, Virginia.
- Discontinuing Seamen's Protection Certificates: Report (to Accompany S. 4316). Washington, D.C.: U.S. G.P.O, 1940. Print.
- Dixon, Ruth, and Katherine G. Eberly. Index to Seamen's Protection Certificate Applications, Port of Philadelphia,–1823 with Supplement, 1796–1851 [i.e. ] 1861: Record Group 36, Records of the Bureau of Customs, National Archives and Records Administration, Washington, Dc. Baltimore, Md: Clearfield, 2001. Print.
- Ira Dye, "The Philadelphia Seamen's Protection Certificate Applications," Prologue 18 (Spring 1986): 46–55; reprinted in Our Family, Our Town: Essays on Family and Local History Sources in the National Archives, comp. Timothy Walch (1987), pp. 60–65.
- Dye, Ira. "The Tattoos of Early American Seafarers, 1796–1818." Proceedings of the American Philosophical Society. 133.4 (1989): 520–54. Print. Abstract: Examples of Tattoos Depicted on Seamen's Protection Certificate Applications. Clerks Writing the Documents Often Sketched the Tattoos as Well as Describing Them.
- Lamar, Christine. Register of Seaman's Protections: Index, 1796–1883. Providence, R.I: Rhode Island Historical Society, 1790. Print. OCLC 25221613. Notes: Index is for Original material in the Collection of the Rhode Island Historical Society Library : United States Custom's House (Providence, R.I.) – Records. MSS 28, Subgroup 1, Series 14, SubSeries A, Volumes 1–6. "Only item ... found in the original records ... not included on the indexed copy is the height of the seaman." "...Age, birthdate and place, and his complexion are all transferred from the original document." Spine title. Indexed source records are on microfilm. See: RIHS Library Reading Room mFilm HA730.P9 A6. For abstracts of the indexed entries see: Register of Seaman's Protection Certificates from the Providence, Rhode Island Custom District, 1796–1870, introduction by Maureen Taylor (Clearfield Co., 1995). See RIHS Library Reading Room HD 8039 .S4 R34.
- Pencak, William. "Maritime Trades." Encyclopedia of African American History, 1619–1895: From the Colonial Period to the Age of Frederick Douglass. OCLC 5037520299. Oxford: Oxford University Press, 2006.
- Seaman's Protection Certificates: Report (to Accompany H.R. 10381). Washington, D.C.: U.S. G.P.O, 1940. Print.
- Taylor, Maureen; Rhode Island Historical Society. Collections. Register of Seamen's Protection Certificates from the Providence, Rhode Island Custom District, 1796–1870: From the Custom House Papers in the Rhode Island Historical Society. Rockport, Me. Picton Press, 1998. ISBN 0-89725-218-7.
- Various. Seamen's Protection Documents. 1777–1860. Archival material. Peabody Essex Museum, Salem, MA. OCLC 660831783. Abstract: Collection includes Seamen's Protection Papers, which served as passports for merchant mariners to prevent impressment while sailing. Collection also includes a blank Certificate of Registry of the United States and membership certificate for John B. Dale at the Naval Library and Institute.
