= Knuckle tattoo =

Kind of tattoo on hands

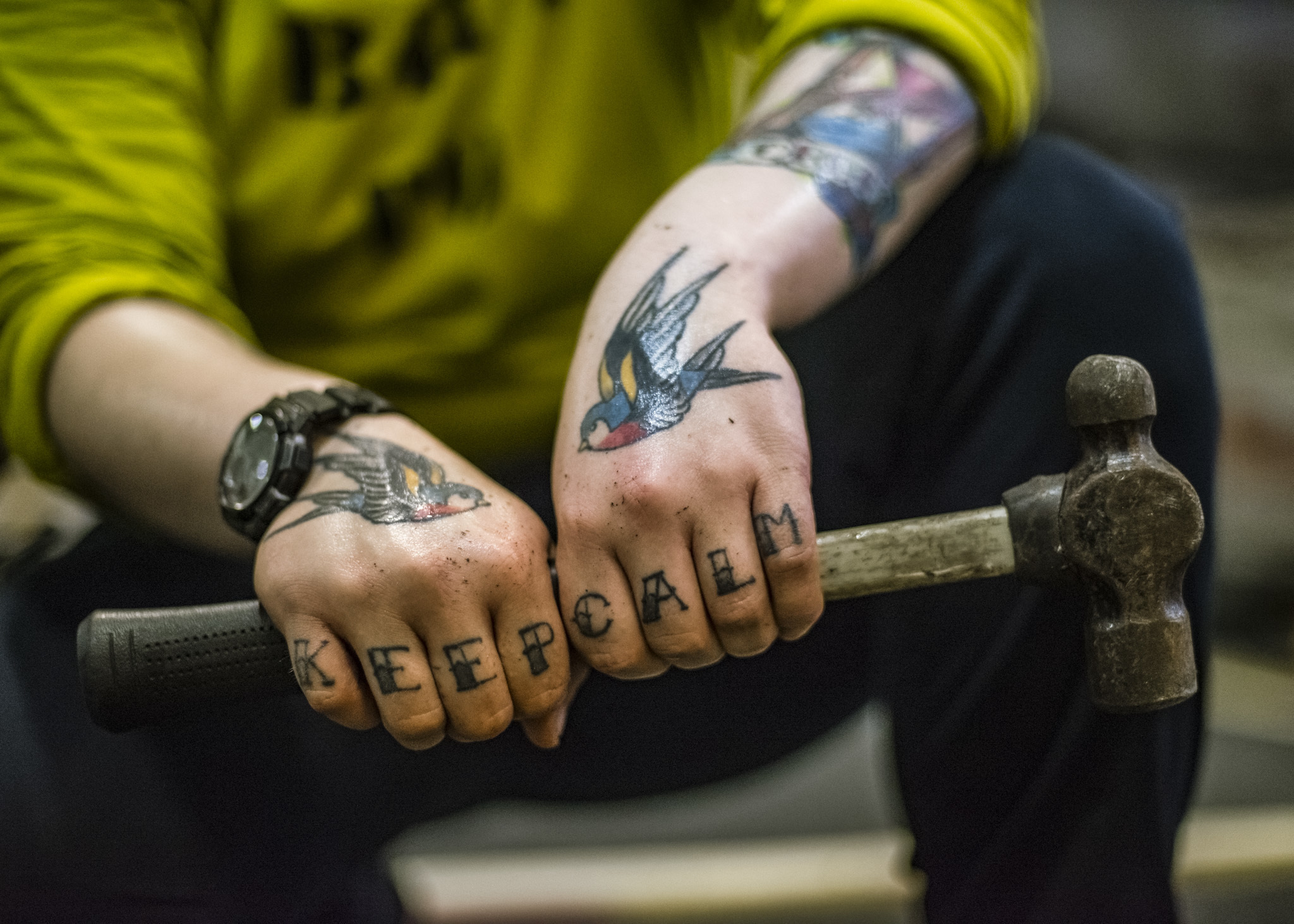
U.S. Navy service member, "Keep Calm", 2016

A knuckle tattoo is a tattoo on the tops of a person's fingers, between the knuckles, commonly two groups of four-letter words or one eight-letter word. It is not necessarily a prison tattoo, as sometimes believed, but remains an unpopular form of tattoo—alongside hand tattoos in general—due to the difficulty of hiding it in situations such as a formal setting where it would be seen as crass. Some people also use their knuckles to tattoo drawings and images, sometimes in groups of four, such as the four symbols of a deck of playing cards.

In sailor tattoo traditions, deckhands may get HOLD / FAST as a charm to support their grip on rigging. The 2003 historical drama film Master and Commander: The Far Side of the World, set in 1805, portrayed a crew member with HOLD / FAST knuckle tattoos. Robert Mitchum's character Preacher Harry Powell wears LOVE / HATE in the 1955 horror-thriller film The Night of the Hunter. In the 1980 action comedy film The Blues Brothers, the main characters have JAKE / ELWO/OD on their knuckles. Musician Flea wears LOVE / LOVE. Metallica frontman James Hatfield wears RIFF / LIFE. Professional wrestler CM Punk wears DRUG / FREE. Filmmaker Lars von Trier wears FUCK on his right hand.
