= Carpenter's axe =

Woodworking tool

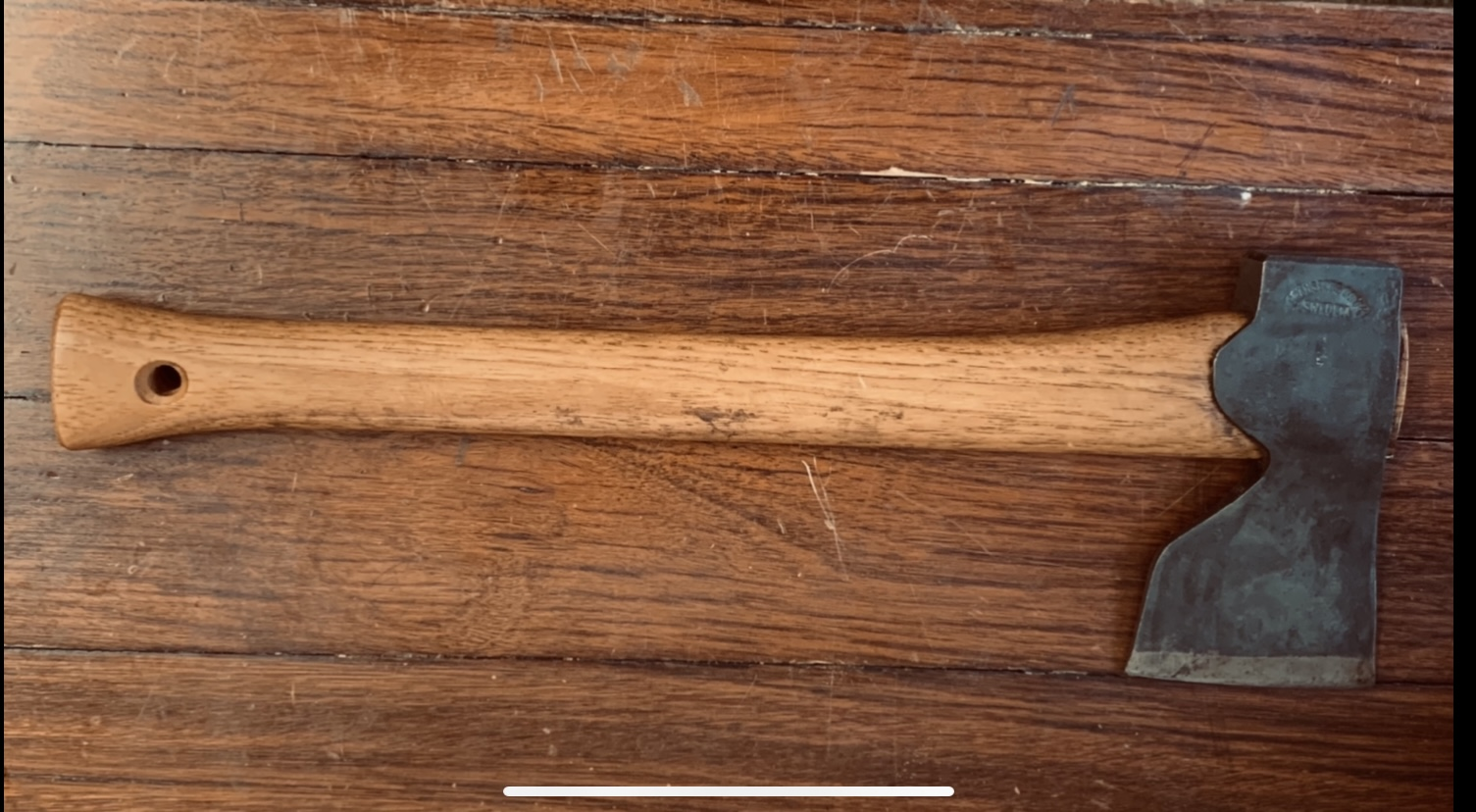
Swedish carpenter's axe with straight handle/cutting edge, beard and notch ideal for choking up on.

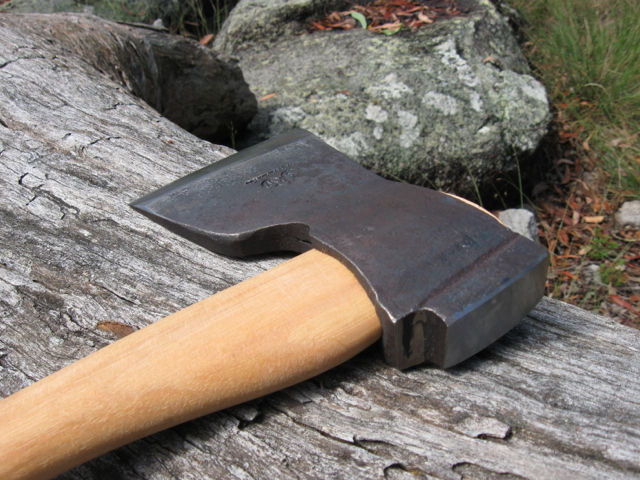
A Swedish carpenter's axe

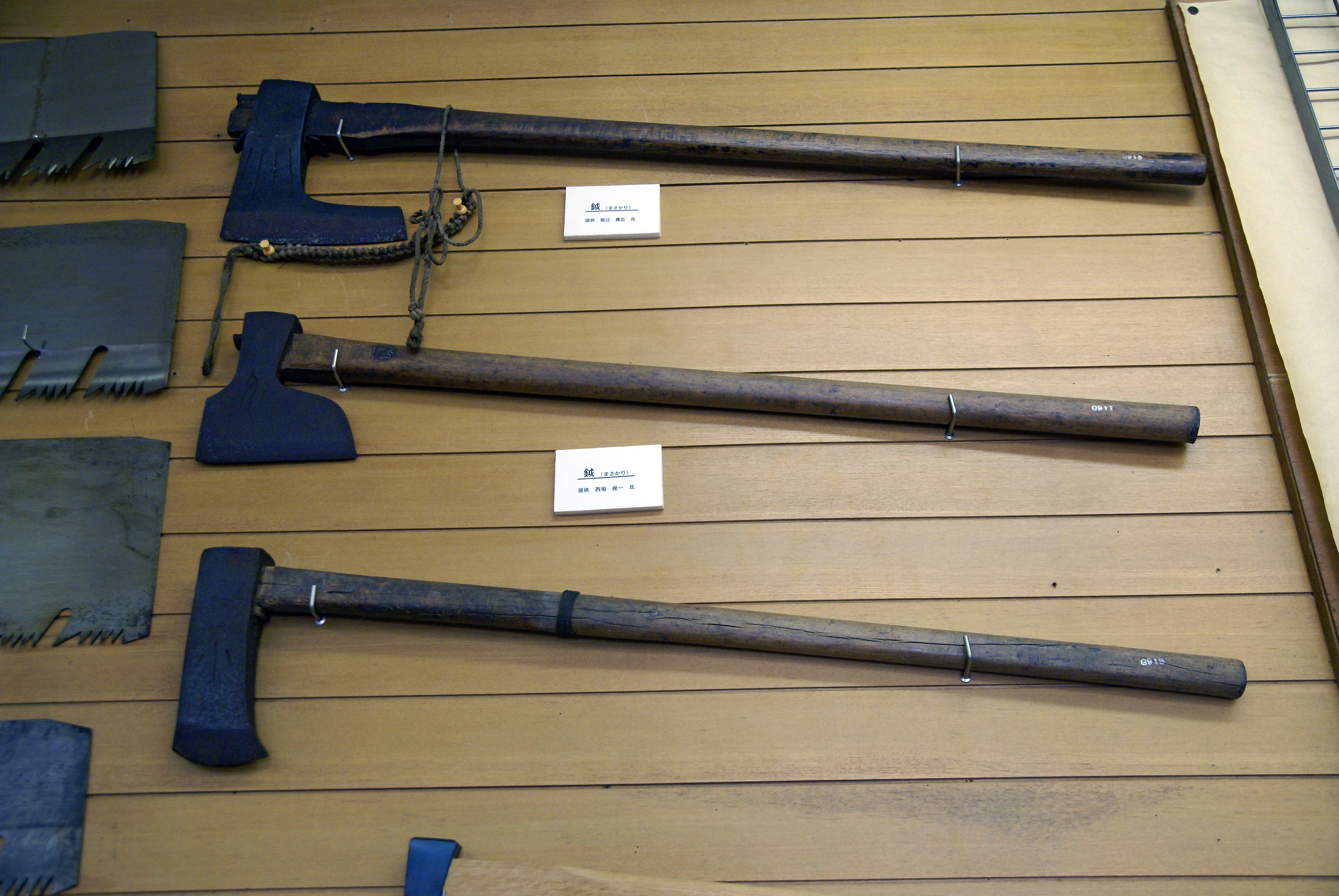
Examples of Japanese carpenter's axes.

Carpenter's axes or carpenter's hatchets are small axes, usually slightly larger than a hatchet, used in traditional woodwork, joinery, and log-building. They have pronounced beards and finger notches to allow a "choked" grip for precise control.

Carpentry axes have straight, long cutting edges and thin blades with a low bevel angle, making them ideal for working with dry wood. These axes also have straight handles, as the curved handles typical of felling and chopping axes would get in the way of the smaller, more precise cuts that carpenters would tend to make. These features allow carpenter's axes to be capable of detailed work such as cutting a plank's end to a desired angled with a planed surface and even rudimentary woodcarving.

The long straight edge of carpentry axes provides a good degree of stability when cutting as well as being the ideal shape for guiding the blade by eye.

The poll, or butt, is generally designed for use as a hammer. Newer carpenter's axes will often have a groove for pulling nails.

== Use in Japanese carpentry ==
In traditional Japanese architecture, wood is the primary building material, as opposed to the western tradition of using stone and brick. Therefore, in the construction of buildings, carpentry axes are vital for quickly removing large amounts of wood in the initial stages of building, such as the construction of columns and support structures. Japanese carpentry axes have wooden handles that are fitted to a socket and have laminated steel blades, which have two different steels: a harder steel for the cutting edge, with a more soft and flexible steel for the back portion of the head.

== Sources ==
"Woodworking Axes". Handyman Tips. 4 November 2016.
