= Matt Lodder =

British tattoo historian

Matthew C. Lodder
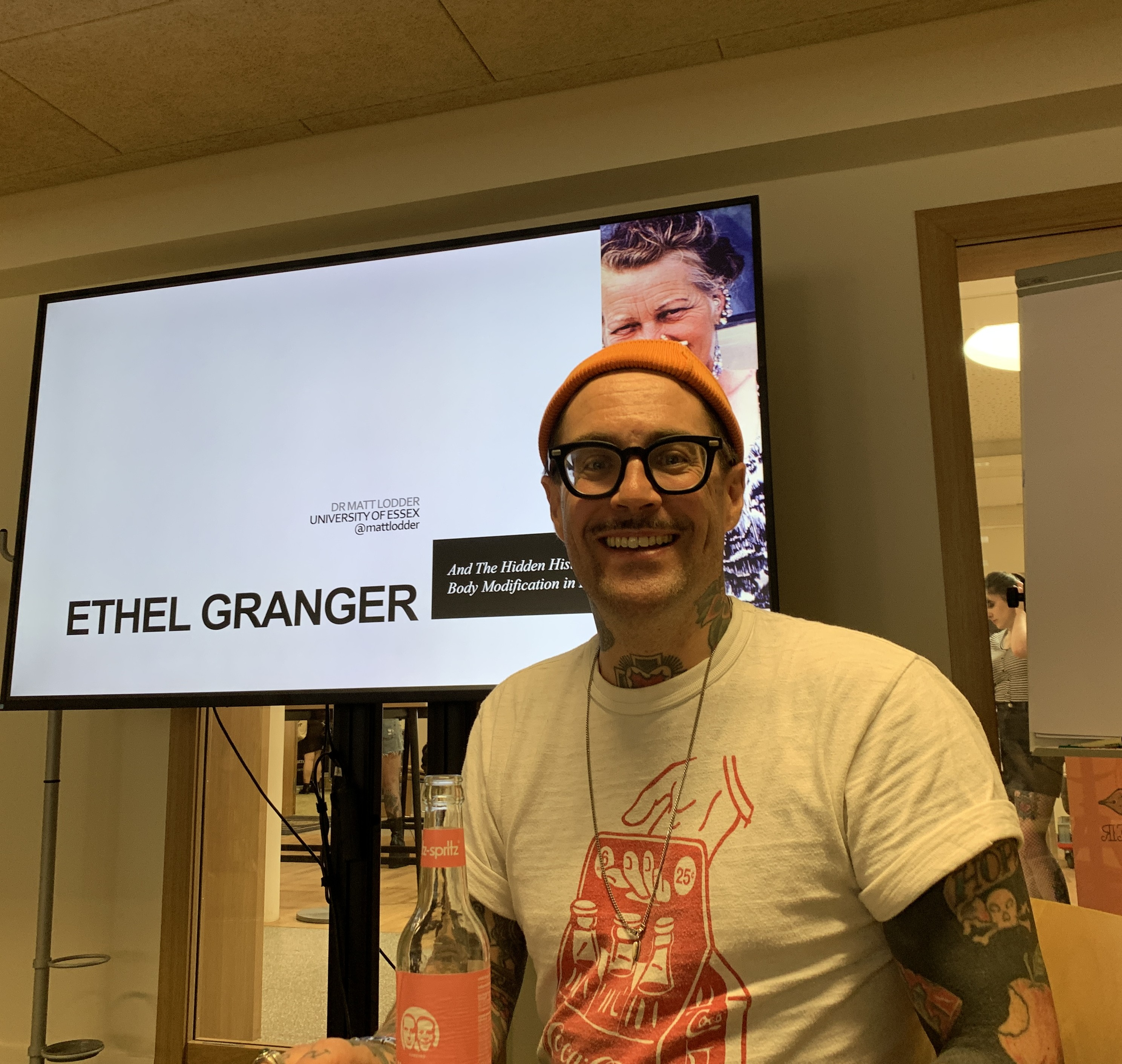
- Matt Lodder in Berlin in 2023
- Known for: Art-historical methodologies to the history of Western tattooing from the 17th century to the present day.

Academic background
- Education: BA (Hons) French & German University of Bradford, MA Critical Theory (The Body and Representation) University of Reading; PhD History of Art - University of Reading.; Senior Lecturer in Art History and Theory

Academic work
- Discipline: Art history
- Institutions: School of Philosophical, Historical and Interdisciplinary Studies, University of Essex
- Website: www.essex.ac.uk/people/LODDE23007/Matt-Lodder

Matthew C. Lodder (born 1980) is a British senior lecturer in art history and theory, director of American studies and an expert in the history of tattooing at the University of Essex. He is also an exhibition curator and one of the University of Essex's Public Voice Scholars. Lodder completed his PhD in 2010, having submitted a thesis entitled Body Art: Body Modification as Artistic Practice. Lodder is a Fellow of the Royal Historical Society.

In 2018, Lodder served as the presenter of 'Art of Museums' for German TV channel ZDF.

Lodder's podcast 'Beneath the Skin' was awarded "Best History Podcast" at the Independent Podcast Awards 2023.

In 2021, he explained to the Guardian how a student in California had impersonated him for years, stealing his academic work and even copying his tattoos.

== Selected works ==
=== Books ===
- Matt Lodder (author): Tattoos: The Untold History of a Modern Art.Yale University Press 2024, ISBN 0-3002-6939-0
- Matt Lodder (author): Painted People: Humanity in 21 Tattoos. HarperCollins Publishers 2022, ISBN 978-0-0084-0206-8
- Matt Lodder (author): Painted People: 5,000 Years of Tattooed History from Sailors and Socialites to Mummies and Kings. HarperCollins Publishers 2023, ISBN ISBN 978-0-0084-0210-5
- Lepine, A., Lodder, M. and McKever, R., (eds.) (2015). Revival: Memories, Identities, Utopias. The Courtauld Institute of Art. ISBN 978-1-907485-04-6

=== Book Sections ===
- Matt Lodder: Hans and "Lady Tattoo Artist" Jessie Knight. In: Manfred Kohrs, Ole Wittmann (Publ.): From the Living Room to Far-off Lands – Tattoo Culture in the Mid-20th Century. IDTG, Wedemark 2025, ISBN 978-3-00-076184-3 (German and English)
- Matt Lodder (co-author): Manfred Kohrs: Vorlagenalbum des Tätowierers Horst "Tattoo-Samy" Streckenbach. IKARUS, Wedemark 2024, ISBN 3-00-076502-6
- Alexa MacDermot (editor), Kathrina Rupit, Matt Lodder: Goblin Market: Irish New Contemporary Art. White Lady Art Books 2012, ISBN 978-0-9573-2230-1
- Matt Lodder (2022) 'Mr Sebastian's Tattooing and Piercing in the context of Operation Spanner'. In Alan Oversby: Documentary Evidence. Editor: King, Paul. Body Piercing Archive. ISBN 978-0-578-36480-3
- Matt Lodder, (2022). 'A Medium, Not a Phenomenon: An Argument for an Art-Historical Approach to Western Tattooing'. In: Tattooed Bodies: Theorizing Body Inscription Across Disciplines and Cultures. Editors: Martell, J. and Larsen, E., . Palgrave Macmillan. 13- 42. ISBN 978-3-030-86565-8
- Matt Lodder (2022). ‘”Geijutsu-tekina” Nihon no irezumi to vuikutoria asa Ingurando no shogyo senryaku’ (‘”Artistic” Japanese Tattoos and Commercial Strategy in Victorian England’), trans. Naho Onuki. In: 身体を彫る、世界を印す イレズミ・タトゥーの人類学 (Sculpting the Body, Marking the World: The Anthropology of Irezumi Tattoo). Editors: Yamamoto, Y., Kuwabara, M. and Tsumura, F., . Shunpusha. ISBN 9784861108037
- Matt Lodder (2015). “The New Old Style: Tradition, Archetype and Rhetoric in Contemporary Western Tattooing”. In: Revival: Memories, Identities, Utopias. Editors: Lepine, A., Lodder, M. and McKever, R., . The Courtauld Institute of Art. ISBN 978-1-907485-04-6
- Matt Lodder (2015). Various artist interviews. In: World Atlas of Tattoo. Editors: Friedman, A. Yale University Press. ISBN 978-0-30021-04-84
- Matt Lodder (2015). “From Paper onto Skin”. In: Tattoo Masters Flash Collection: Selected Styles Around the World. Editors: Reuss, M. and Hoill, E. Editions Reuss. ISBN 978-394310-53-08
- Matt Lodder(2013). “Neo-Victorian Tattooing”. In: Victoriana A Miscellany... (ex. cat.) ISBN 978-190279-51-57
- Matt Lodder, (2012). Foreword. In: Forever The New Tattoo. Editors: Klanten, R. Die Gestalten Verlag. ISBN 978-389955-44-27
- Matt Lodder (2009). “A Somatechnological Paradigm: How do you Make Yourself a Body without Organs?”. In: Somatechnics: Queering the Technologisation of Bodies. Editors: Sullivan, N. and Murray, S. Ashgate. 187- 206. ISBN 9780754675303
- Al Overdrive (author,inset photographer), Matt Lodder (author of introduction): No Commercial Value: The Photography of Al Overdrive. AO 2008, ISBN 978-0-9558-6710-1

=== Journal articles ===
- Lodder, M., (2016). Visual pleasure and gonzo pornography: Mason's challenge to convention in ‘the hardest of hardcore’. Porn Studies. 3 (4), 373–385
- Dymock, A. and Lodder, M., (2016). 'The Erotics of Injury: Remembering Operation Spanner Workshops', 10&11 September 2015, University of Essex and Royal Holloway, University of London. Porn Studies. 3 (3), 320–323
- Lodder, M., (2015). ‘Things of the sea’: iconographic continuities between tattooing and handicrafts in Georgian-era maritime culture. Sculpture Journal. 24 (2), 195–210
- Lodder, M., (2013). Art History in the Pub. Journal of Visual Culture. 12 (2), 332–338

== Exhibitions ==
- British Tattoo Art Revealed, described as a "visionary exhibition" by anthropologist and tattoo researcher Lars Krutak, began at the National Maritime Museum Cornwall in March 2017 and toured nationwide through 2020.
- Skin Digging, Art Exchange/University of Essex
