= Anthony Natsoulas =

American sculptor

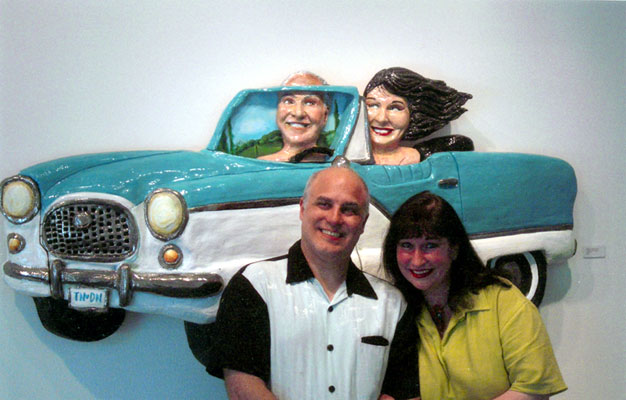
- Born: 1959 (age 66–67)
- Education: University of California at Davis, Davis, CA
- Known for: Sculpture, Ceramics
- Awards: 1998 “New Works”

Anthony 'Tony' Natsoulas (born 1959 in Ann Arbor, Michigan) is an American sculptor and contemporary artist. Numerous galleries and museums such as the San Francisco Museum of Modern Art, the Monterey Museum of Art, Sonoma Valley Museum of Art, and the San Jose Museum of Art have exhibited Tony Natsoulas' work in the past; there are several large-scale pieces in public spaces.

== Biographical and career information ==
Anthony Natsoulas grew up in Davis. In high school, he attended classes taught by Robert Arneson and visited the studio of Clayton Bailey. Natsoulas attended California State University, Sacramento, where he studied with Robert Brady and Ruth Rippon. He returned to UC Davis in 1979 and received his Bachelor of Arts degree in 1982. After a year of study at the Maryland Institute, College of Art, he returned to UC Davis for his MFA and began exhibiting his life-size figurative ceramic sculptures at the Rena Bransten Gallery in San Francisco.

== Work ==
Natsoulas' works generally depict people, often engaged in whimsical activities. The physical features of the subjects are often exaggerated to give them a sense of humor or playfulness.

"His figures range from commissioned works to ceramic portraits of celebrities, sometimes depicted in period costume. Details and themes are influenced by images from popular culture, absurdist television shows, people, toys, cartoons, plays, and nostalgic movies. Natsoulas began making larger-than-life, exaggerated ceramic busts in 1997. He uses a similar sculptural technique to Arneson: his sculptures lack depth from front to back. His figures are caricatures, often with enlarged heads. His approach to the work is influenced by Robert Arneson, his former teacher at the University of California, Davis."

Natsoulas also makes large objects for public spaces. A life-size painted bronze titled Balancing Act Too (1993) has stood in Sacramento's Plaza Cervantes since 2015. The double sculpture The Joggers (1986) stands in front of Davis' historic City Hall, formerly home to the Fire Department and later the Davis Police Department. Another sculpture stands in the University of Davis library.

Natsoulas: I remember what Bob Arneson said to us as students, “Always push your work, never be satisfied, it's art, Experiment!”

== Solo exhibitions (selection) ==
- 2025 Fresno Art Museum
- 2023 Larger than Life, Sanchez Art Center, Pacifica, CA
- 2016 Barro Funky, Avenue 50 Gallery, North Los Angeles, CA
- 2015 Buggin, Morris Graves Museum of Art, Eureka, CA
- 2013 Smith Anderson Gallery, Palo Alto, CA
- 2012 Doing the Basil, Sacramento State University Union Gallery, California State University
- 2007 Axis Gallery, Sacramento, CA
- 2005 James Snidle Fine Arts, San Francisco, CA
- 2004 James Snidle Fine Arts, Chico, CA
- 2003 Triton Museum, Santa Clara, CA
- 2002 Barococo, Crocker Art Museum, Sacramento, CA
- 2001 Oakland Museum Downtown Sculpture Court, Oakland, CA
- 1999 Solomon Dubnick Gallery, Sacramento, CA
- 1996 Patricia Sweetow, Napa, CA
- 1994 Beuhler Alumni Center, UC Davis, CA
- 1993 The Landis Gallery, Berkeley, CA
- 1992 University of the Pacific, Stockton, CA
- 1990 California State University, Chico, CA
- 1989 Rena Bransten Gallery, San Francisco, CA
- 1987 Himovitz/Salomon Gallery, Sacramento, CA
- 1986 Rena Bransten Gallery, San Francisco, CA
- 1985 Gorman Museum, the University of CA at Davis, Masters Exhibition
- 1984 Davis Art Center, Davis, CA

== Trivia ==
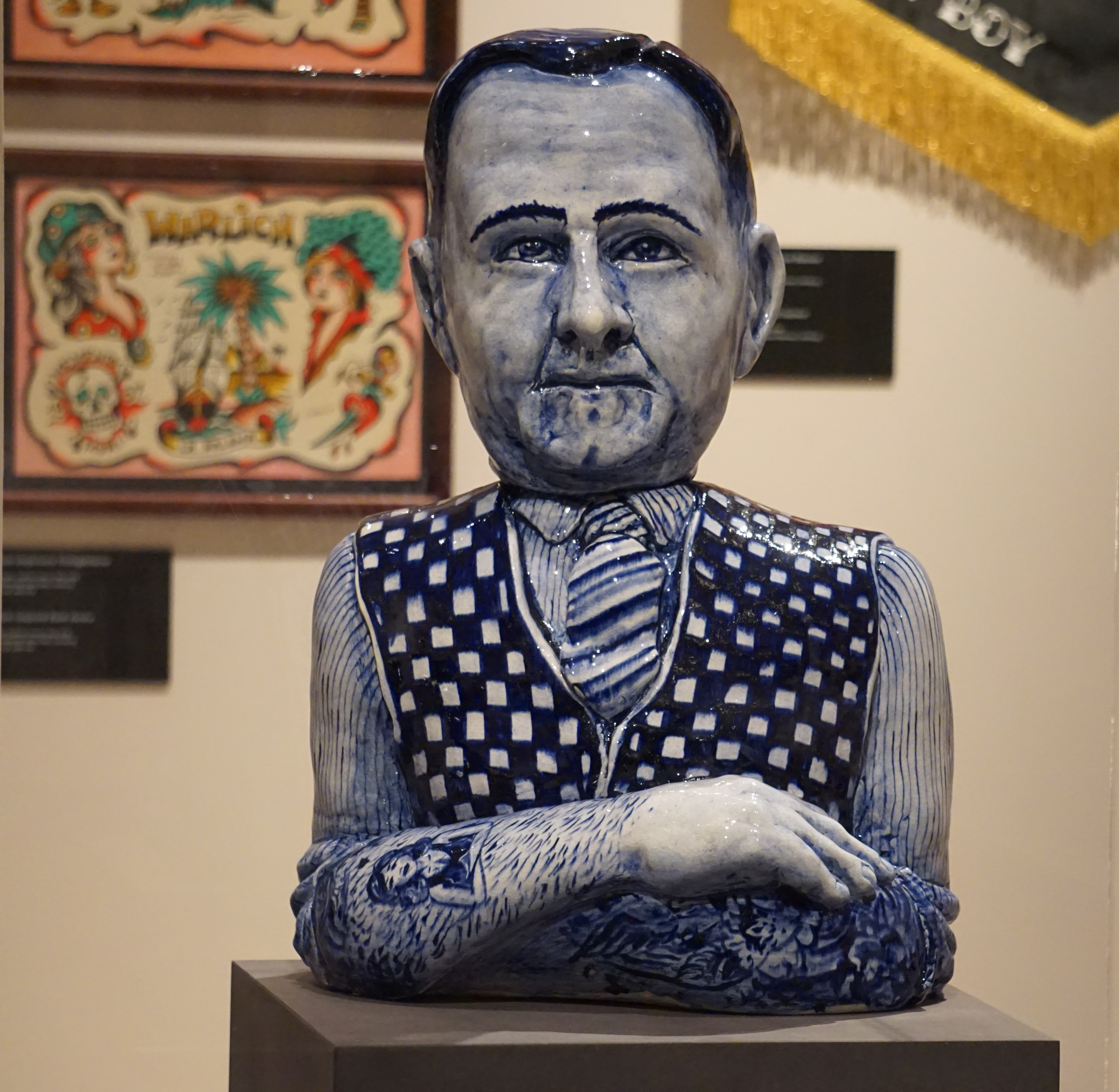
Christian Warlich by Natsoulas 2020

Ceramic bust "Christian Warlich" by Anthony Natsoulas. From November 2019 to May 2020, the Museum für Hamburgische Geschichte presented a special exhibition titled Tattoo Legends. Christian Warlich on St. Pauli, which was curated by Ole Wittmann; technical support and scientific assistant Manfred Kohrs. Natsoulas made a ceramic bust of Warlich, especially for this exhibition, which was presented in the exhibition. The glaze for the work was made by tattoo and ceramic artist Britton McFetridge.

== Awards ==
- 1998 “New Works” Grant
- Nominated for Artist of the Year from the Sacramento Arts and Business Council
- Named by the Smithsonian as one of the top 100 craft artists in the United States
- Recipient of the “Key to the City”, 2000, Lake Charles, Louisiana
- Recipient of the “Community Arts Award, Pence Art Gallery, Davis CA

== Selected bibliography ==
- Martha Drexler Lynn: American Studio Ceramics Innovation and Identity, 1940 to 1979. Yale University Press 2015, ISBN 978-0-3002-1273-0, S. 238
- Brian Elsasser: Tony Natsoulas at the Crocker Art Museum. ArtWeek Magazine November 2002.
- Bill Jones: Sculpture Techniques. Westerville, OH: American Ceramic Society, 2015.
- Brigitte Martin: Humor in Craft. Schiffer Publishing Ltd., Atglen 2014.
- Judith Schwartz: Confrontational Ceramics. University of Pennsylvania Press, Philadelphia 2008.
- Scott Shields: Tony Natsoulas, Camping it Up. Ceramics Art and Perception 2003.
- Philip Linhares, Jo Lauria: Larger Than Life: the Art of Tony Natsoulas. Primedia eLaunch LLC 2023, ISBN 979-8-8912-1500-9.
- Tony Natsoulas' website https://www.tonynatsoulas.com
