= Kohr =

Kohr is a surname. Notable persons with that name include:

- Dominik Kohr (born 1994), German footballer
- Harald Kohr (born 1962), German football coach and player
- Leopold Kohr (1909–1994), Austrian economist, jurist and political scientist

== See also ==
- KOHR
- Kohrs
