= Tätowierkunst =

German tattoo artists organization

Tätowierkunst e.V.
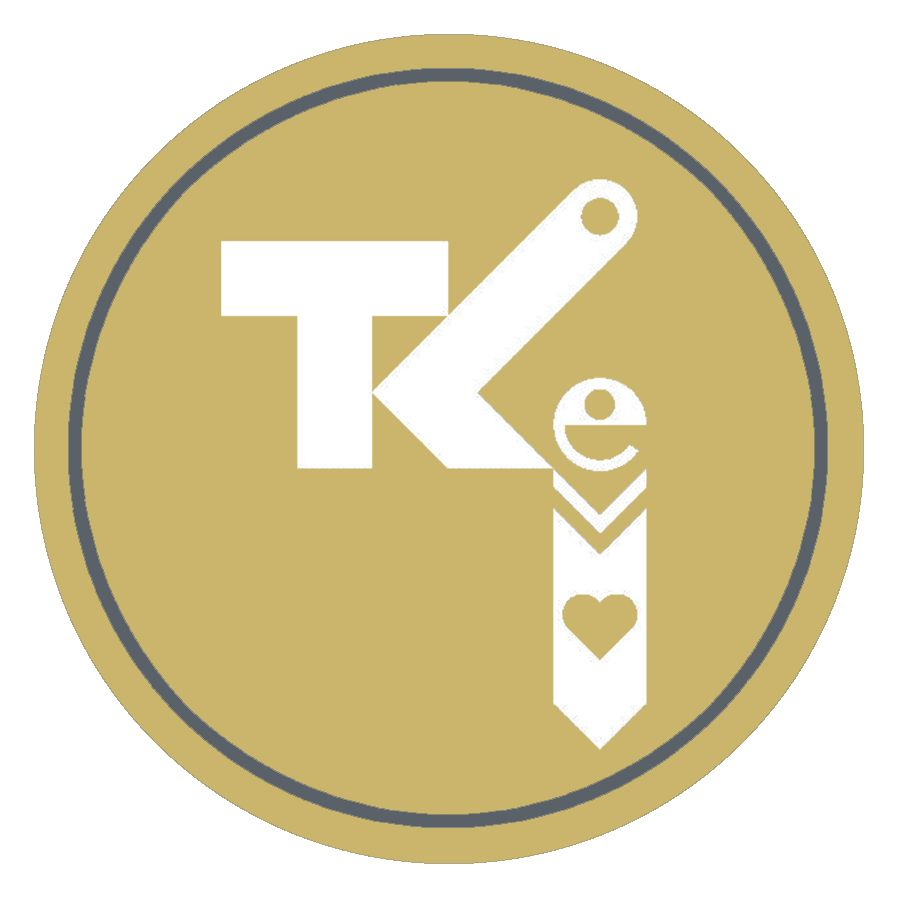
- Founded: 2000; Hanover, Germany
- Type: Nonprofit organization
- Purpose: Tattoo-Art,
- Location: Münster,
- Region served: Germany
- Method: Artivism, social center, research, innovation
- Members: >500 (2022)
- Key people: Tobias Salewski (Chairman); Julia Pucher; Matthias Hanrath
- Website: taetowierkunst.org/

The Tätowierkunst e.V. (abbreviated as TK) is an association of German tattoo artists registered as a formal organization in 2000. The organization promotes recognition of tattooing as a form of fine art and cultural heritage. It hosts educational events and art exhibits, and it encourages scientific research related to tattooing. It has also advocated for tattoo artists to be eligible for the German Artists' Social Security Fund.

== History ==
In 1977, Manfred Kohrs founded the first German tattoo artists' association, the National Tattoo Club Germany, "to have tattooing recognized as a form of visual art", although it was not a registered association. Among the founding members were Horst Streckenbach and Theodor Vetter. This association became the Expo 2000, through entry in the Hanover association register, the KUNSTverein 2000 e.V., which was renamed Tätowierkunst e.V. at a special association meeting on December 2, 2018 and subsequently attained charitable status.

After 18 years, Kohrs handed over the presidency to Heiko Gantenberg, who continued to promote the idea of establishing tattooing as a form of visual art and recognizing it as an intangible cultural heritage. With the election of chairwoman Tanina Palazzolo, the association's headquarters moved to Münster in June 2021. Members include tattoo artists, art historians, lawyers, and scientists.

The TK is "part of the Council of European Tattoo Associations (CETA), a kind of round table for the industry at European level."

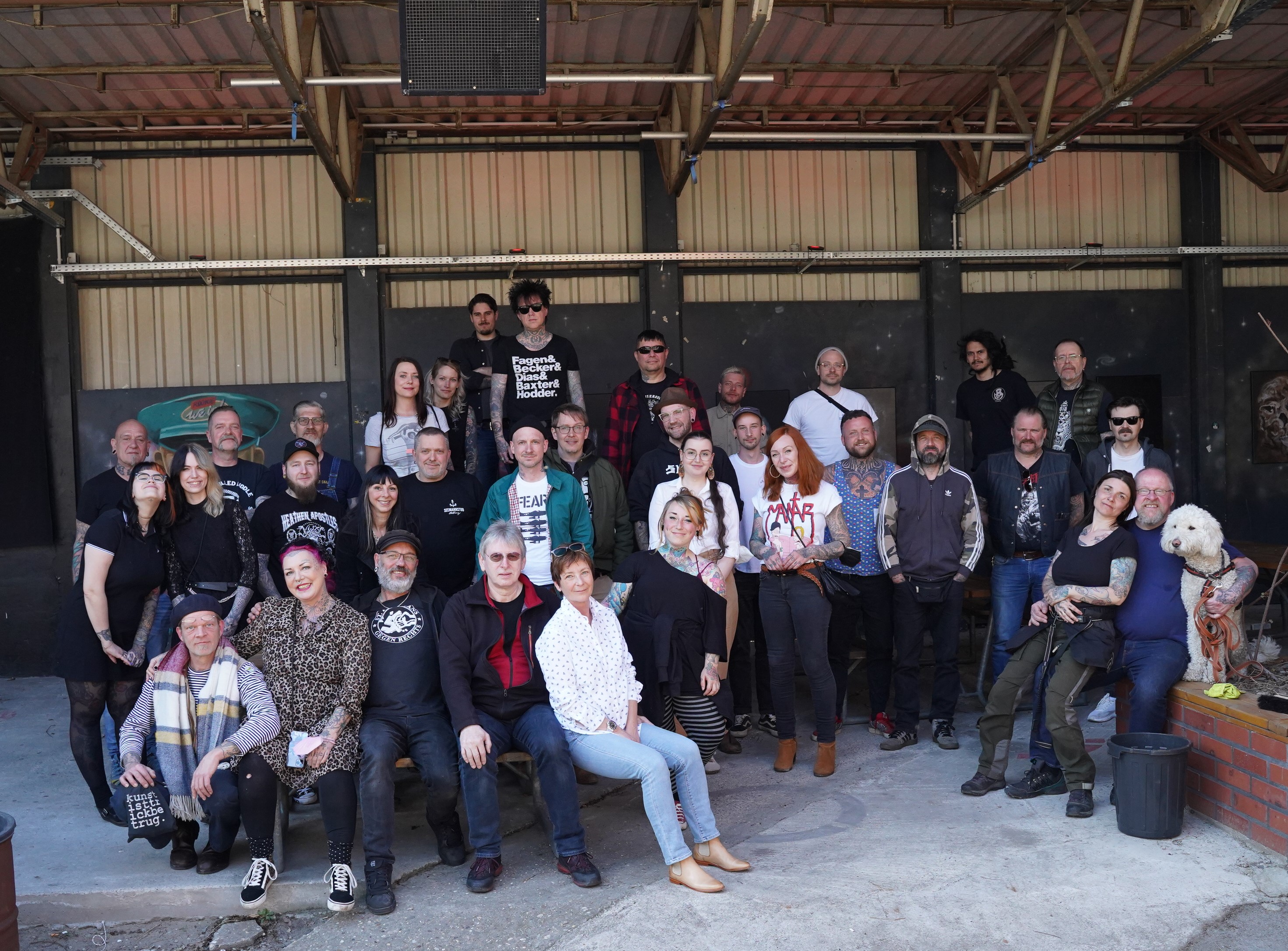
Annual general meeting 2022

″The Tätowierkunst e. V. is a German association for the promotion of art and culture in the field of tattoo art. It is the first and currently the only association dedicated to this art form and its establishment as a manifestation of the visual arts in the German-speaking world; it thus takes a pioneering role″.

== Advocacy ==
The concept of the TK includes the establishment of tattooing as a manifestation of fine art and recognition as an intangible cultural heritage. The purpose of the statute is realized in particular by holding events and exhibitions on German art of tattooing and promoting scientific research in the field of tattooing, lectures and seminars are also offered.

Furthermore, the association is involved in relation to the possibility of tattooing being recognized as an art form in the commercial and tax sense. The possibility of including tattoo artists in the German Artists' Social Security Fund (Künstlersozialkasse) is also being promoted by TK. The TK is supported by several members of the Bundestag, such as Roderich Kiesewetter, Saskia Ludwig, and Helge Lindh.

I therefore suggest, with all the necessary consideration, to clear the way and allow tattooists access to the artists' social security fund, according to the same criteria as other artists. I would be very pleased if you would comply with my suggestion. From my point of view, a good first step could be the inclusion of tattooing in the catalog of recognized artistic activities.

— Saskia Ludwig to the KSK on June 22, 2021.

== Exhibitions ==
- 2021: Unlocked Art exhibition.
- 2021: Gallery Night: Road to Tattoo. Berlin September 24, 2021
- 2022: Tätowierkünstler Zeichnungen, Vanni Prison, Olli Rose and Jens Gössling.
- 2022: DAYGLO EXTRAVAGANZA. A black light group exhibition presented by TK and No Pain No Gain tattoos Ulm.
- 2022: Glaube-Liebe-Hoffnung The exhibition was initially to be shown as an art and culture exhibition from October 29, 2022 to November 25, 2022 in the Church of the Resurrection in Marl. However, the exhibition was canceled at short notice by the parish management due to minor structural defects in the church and the TK took over the execution itself. On October 29, 2022, the vernissage of the exhibition Glaube | Liebe | Hoffnung instead. The city of Marl granted the TK cultural funding for this art event.
- 2023: Erich Haeckel tätowiert von Myriam Black Museum Folkwang, April 13, 2023

== Selected bibliography ==
- Manfred Kohrs, Steven Wrigley, Terry Manton, Lal Hardy: Tattoo Clubs and Associations - A European Review. In: Tattoo Kulture Magazine 49, March 2022, pp. 12–20. (in German)
- Christa Appel, MA: Tätowierkunst e.V. In: Tattoo Kulture Magazine 49, March 2022, pp. 21–24. (in German)
