= Christian Warlich =

German tattooist (1891–1964)

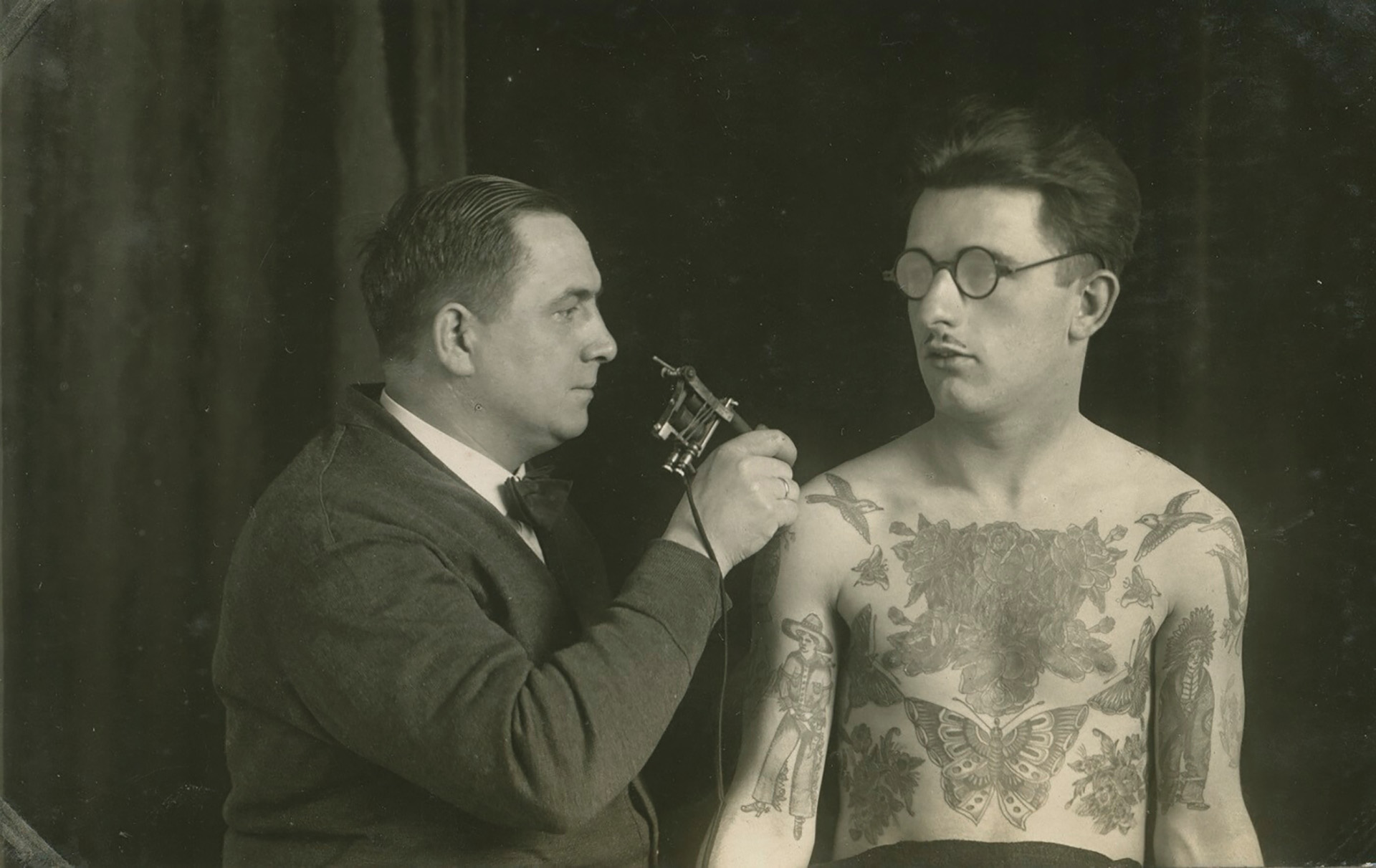
- Christian Warlich (left) in 1930
- Born: 5 January 1891; Hanover, German Empire
- Died: 27 February 1964 (aged 73); Hamburg, West Germany
- Occupations: Tattooist and innkeeper

Christian Warlich (5 January 1891 – 27 February 1964) was a Hamburg-based tattooist who professionalised tattooing in Germany. He may have been the first tattoo artist to use an electric tattoo machine in Germany.

== Biography ==
Warlich was born and raised in Hannover-Linden. He left his parental home at the age of 14, went to Dortmund, and may have apprenticed as a boilermaker. He may have started tattooing by hand, with needles and ink, around age 14. According to Warlich, he also went to sea; he may have been a stoker on passenger ships. He may have had contact with tattooists in the U.S., although there is not much documentation of his early biographical details in general. He got married in 1914 in Hamburg.

Around 1919 or 1921, Warlich opened a pub at Kieler Straße 44 (today Clemens-Schultz-Straße), in the St. Pauli district of the port city of Hamburg. There was a separate area where he tattooed, divided by a curtain. His grandson and Theodor Vetter, a close friend of the family, worked as a business tout for Warlich. According to Warlich, he tattooed "everything the male body should express […] politics, eroticism, athleticism, aesthetics, religion, in all colours, at every location". Though, in the context of a legal dispute about a face tattoo which was done by a competitor, Warlich said "a decent tattooer does not tattoo a face". He created his own tattoo designs, influenced by a wide range of images including American popular culture, Japanese art, and European fine art. He also developed a method for tattoo removal. He mentored tattoo artist Herbert Hoffmann.

In over 40 years of working as a tattooist he had more than 50,000 customers, including Prince Axel and Prince Viggo from the Danish Royal family. Warlich died at work in his pub.

== Legacy ==
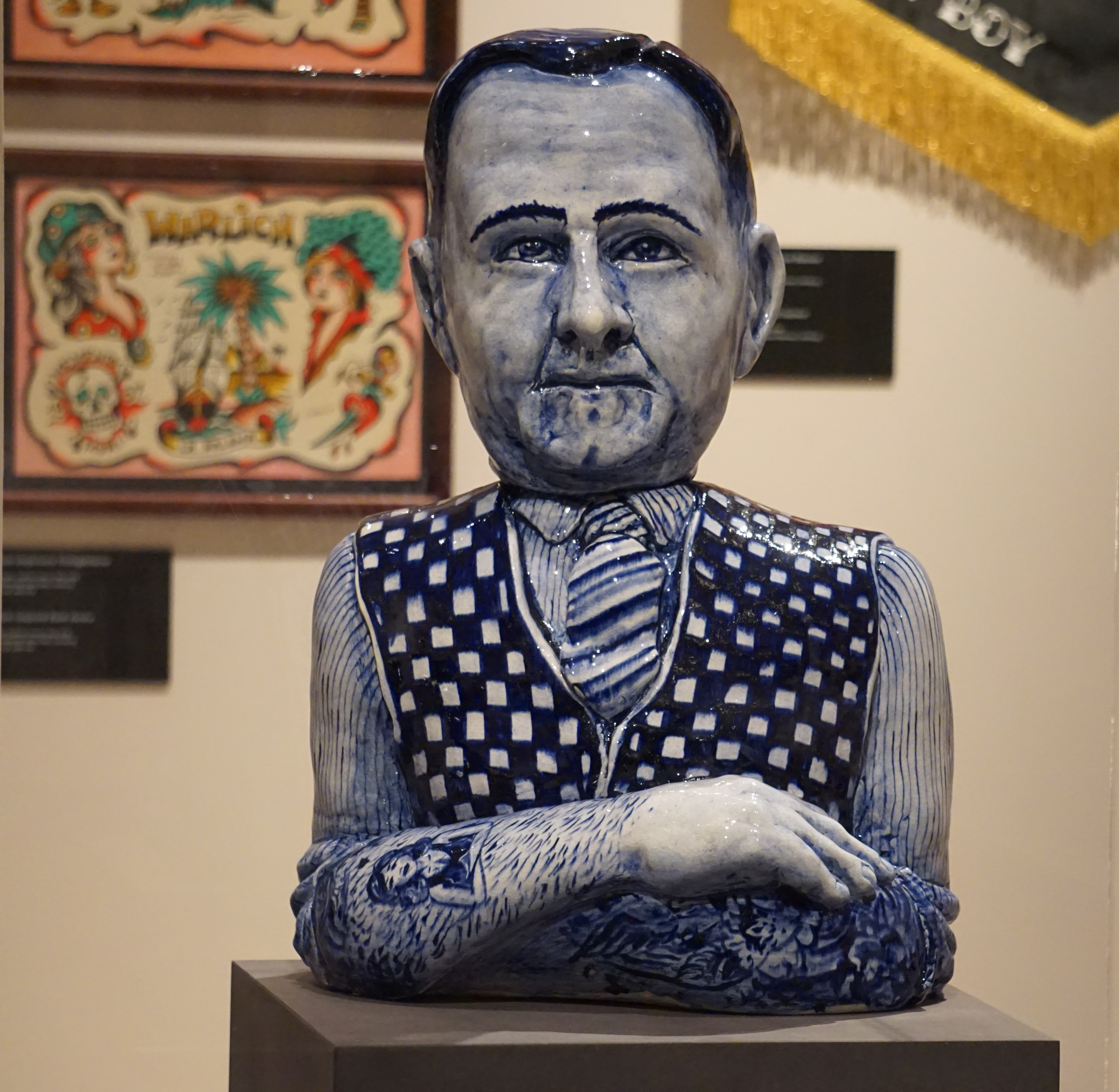
Ceramic artist Anthony Natsoulas created this artwork for the special exhibition "Tattoo Legends. Christian Warlich at St. Pauli"; the artwork was glazed by Britton McFetridge.

After Warlich's death, Theodor Vetter inherited part of his estate. Another part of the estate, including Warlich's famous flash book (Vorlagealbum) and photos, was sold to the Museum of Hamburg History in 1965. In 1981, Stephan Oettermann published Warlich's flash book with an accompanying text in cooperation with the museum, and over the next ten years, three editions of the volume were published. Oettermann's publication was highly valued, but the images from the flash book were reproduced at relatively low quality. The museum published a revised, higher-quality edition in 2019. The museum also showed Warlich's flash book in the exhibit "Wohin mit der Stadt" in 2013.

The Hamburg-based art historian Ole Wittmann was the head of the research project "Der Nachlass des Hamburger Tätowierers Christian Warlich (1891–1964)", also known as "Nachlass Warlich", which was carried out in cooperation with the museum. Wittmann was a postdoc scholarship holder of the Hamburg Foundation for the Promotion of Science and Culture (Hamburger Stiftung zur Förderung von Wissenschaft und Kultur).

The exhibition Tattoo Legends. Christian Warlich in St Pauli was on display in the Museum of Hamburg History in 2019–2020. It was a large-scale show about Warlich, who became known as the "King of Tattooists" and is considered one of the most important tattooists of the 20th century. On 13 March 2020 the museum was suddenly closed to visitors due to the COVID 19 pandemic. On March 20 the exhibition was the only current international special exhibition that could be visited online. A show that had already been declared dead was reanimated only a few days after the sudden lockdown and there was active participation of a community in the topic of tattoo history. In addition, the online tour allowed virtual excursions and curatorial tours, among others for a seminar at the Christian-Albrechts-University of Kiel. The virtual tour was awarded gold at the Annual Multimedia Award 2021 in the category "Events on the Internet".

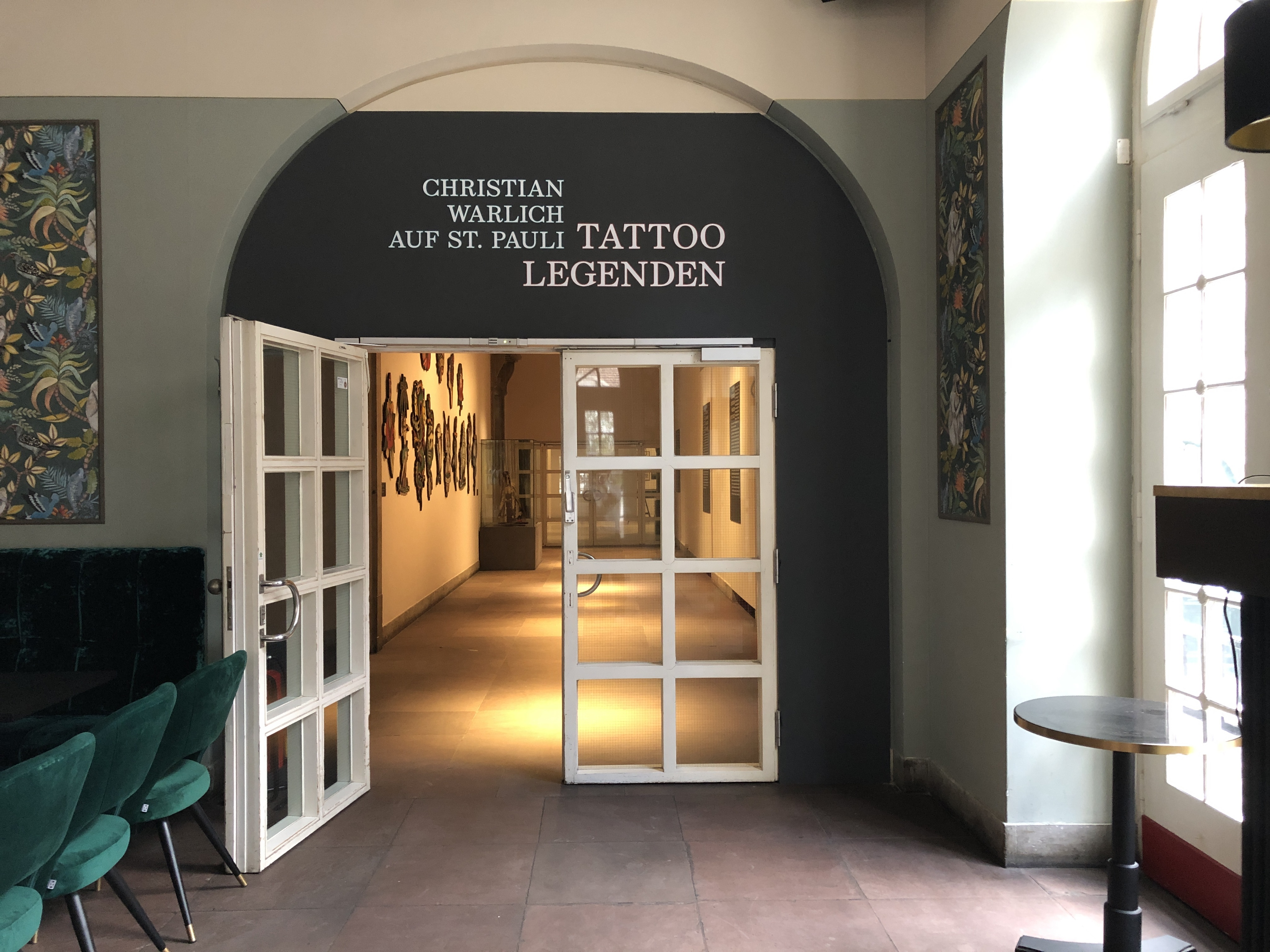

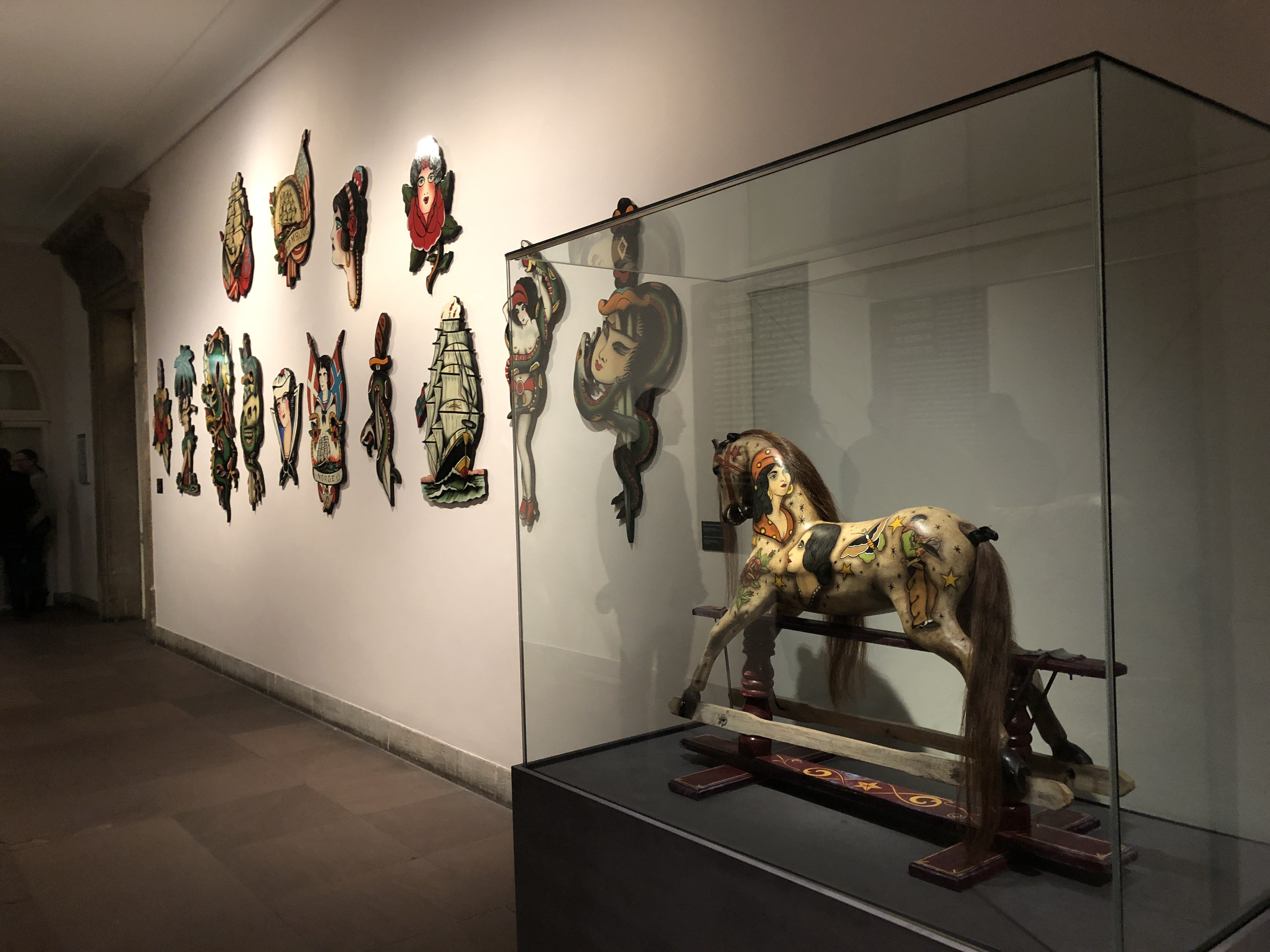

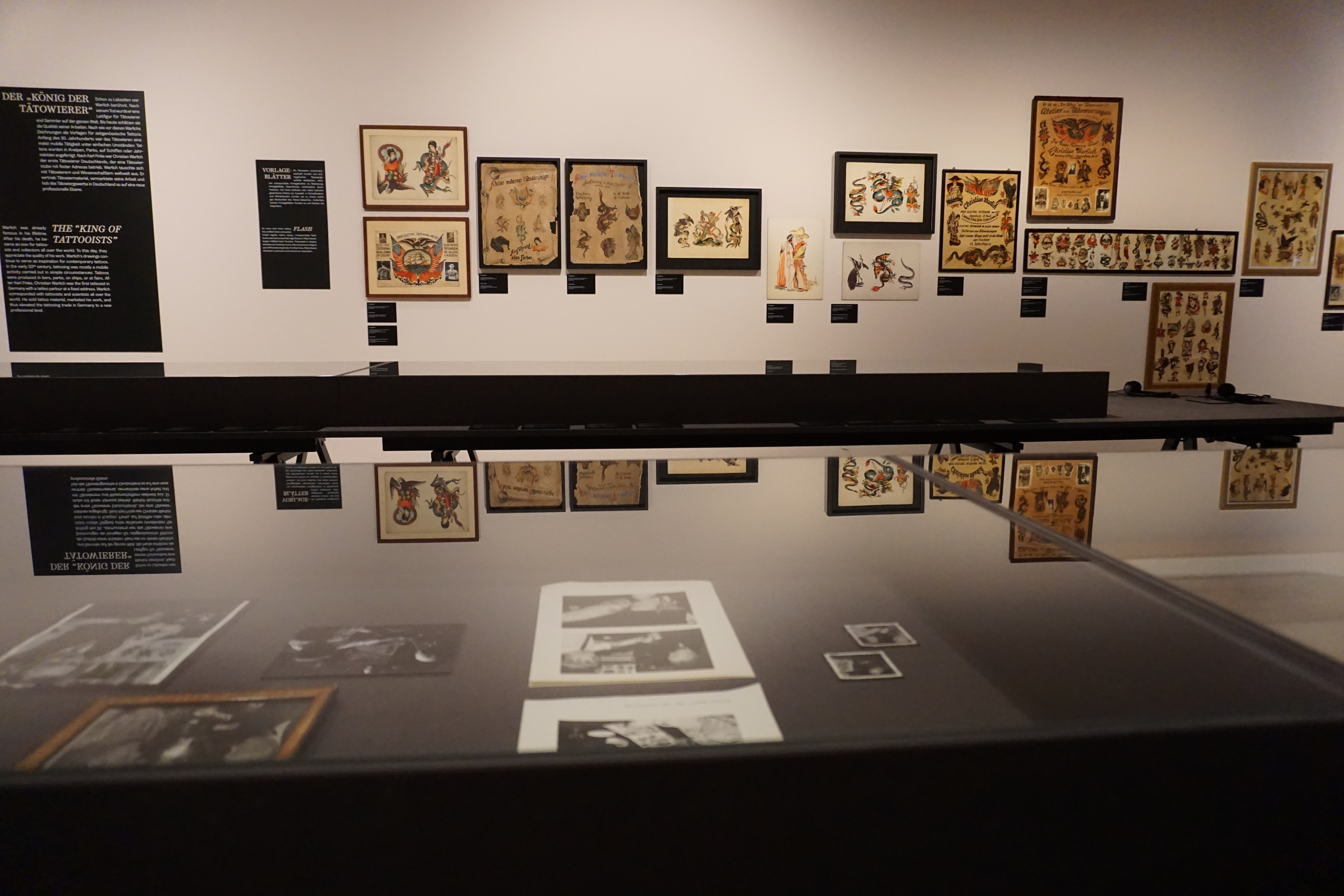

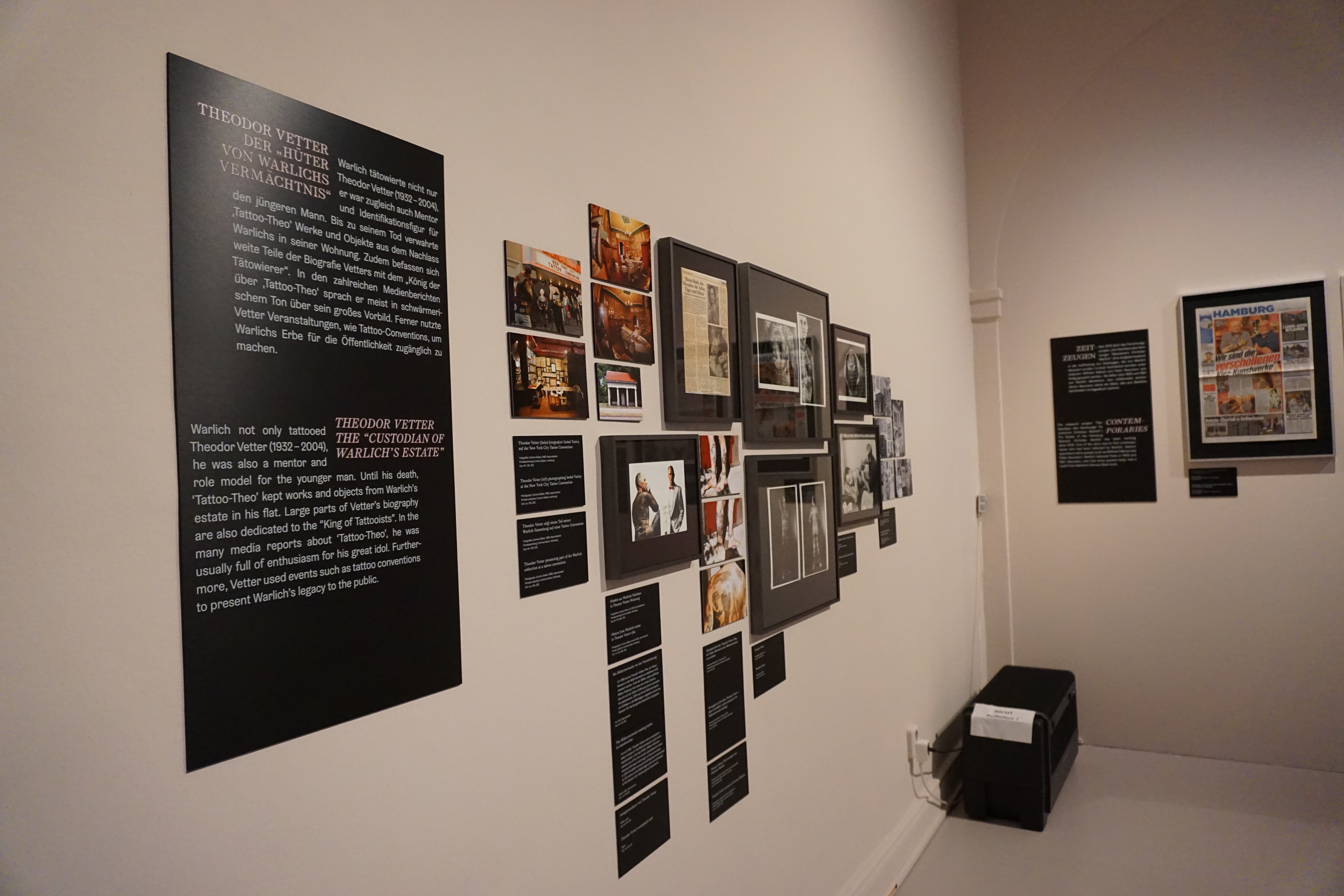

== See also ==
- List of tattoo artists
