= Kohrs =

Kohrs is a surname of German origin. Notable people with the surname include:

- Bob Kohrs (born 1958), American defensive back and linebacker
- Conrad Kohrs (1835–1920), American cattle rancher and politician
- Manfred Kohrs (born 1957), German tattooist and conceptual artist
- Randy Kohrs, American multi-instrumentalist
