= Manfred Kohrs =

German tattooer and conceptual artist (born 1957)

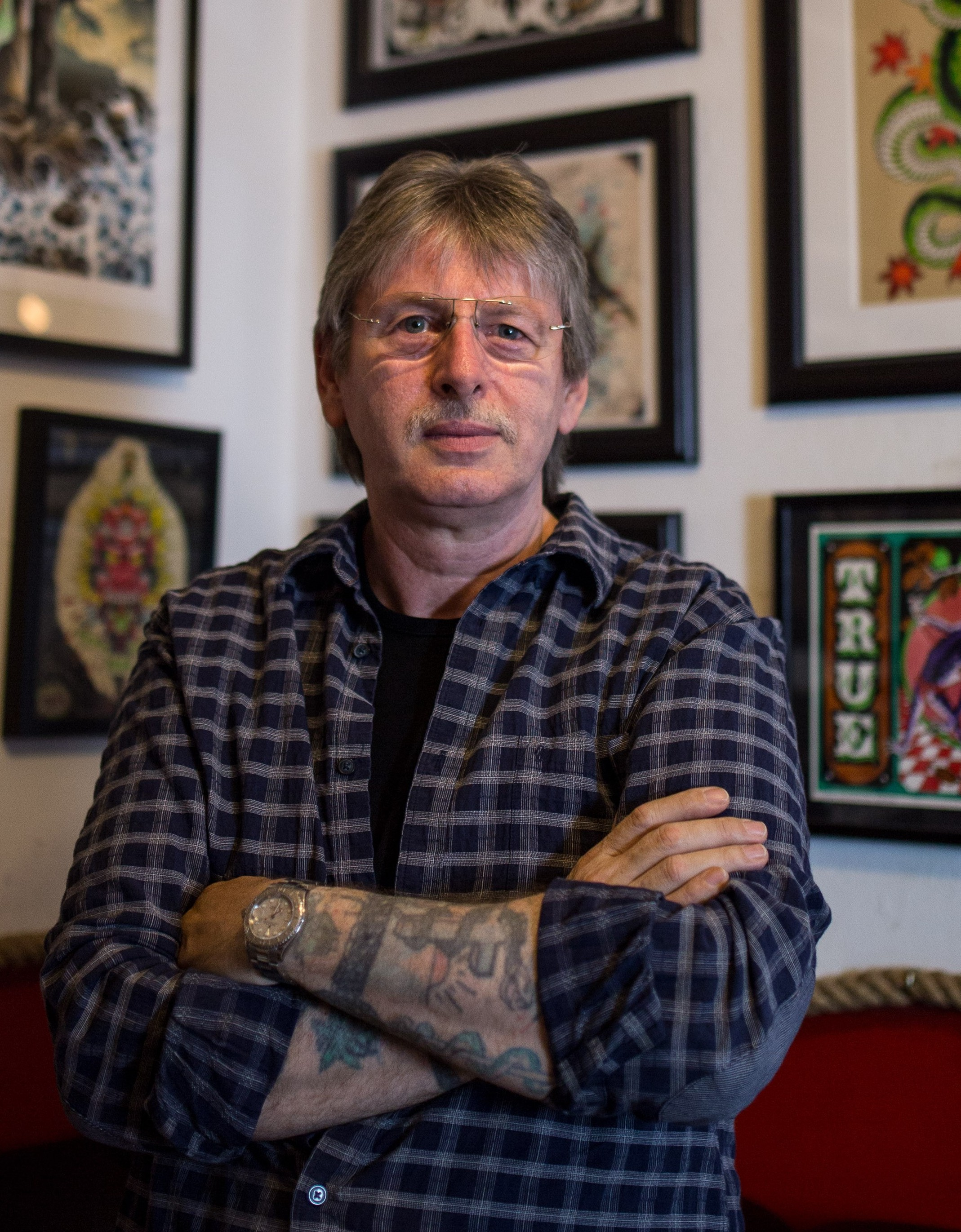
- Born: 24 January 1957 (age 69); Hanover, West Germany
- Occupations: Tattooer; Art-Painter; Master of Economics

Manfred Kohrs (born 24 January 1957) is a German tattooer and conceptual artist, who has been tattooing since 1974. He was a student of Horst Streckenbach ("Tattoo Samy") (5 August 1926 – 27 June 2001). Together they developed the barbell piercing in 1975. Kohrs invented a rotary tattoo machine with main part an electric motor and an ink reservoir. In 1977 Kohrs founded the first German Tattoo Artist Association. Kohrs has been chairman of the board of the Institute for German Tattoo History (IDTG), which he founded 1997. He gave up tattooing in 1990 and began studying economics. He completed his studies in economics and business administration and continues to work as an economist and business administrator in tax consulting even after his retirement in 2022.

== Biographical and career information ==
Kohrs was born in 1957 and grew up in Hanover, West Germany; from 1968 to 1974 he played Rugby in Hanover-List. From 1971 to 1973, he trained as a mechanic at the Deutsche Grammophon Gesellschaft.

At the age of twelve he purchased his first tattoo and in 1975 he was tattooed by Herbert Hoffmann. The integrated nationally recognized tattoo artist Horst Streckenbach took Kohrs in 1975 as a master student. In 1976, he began tattooing professionally. In 1977, he opened his own studio in Hanover.

Manfred Kohrs coined the phrase: "...a tattoo shows who you are. Therefore, when choosing the motif and the body part, you should consider that in the future you may not want to show everyone who you once were.

″To move tattooing forward, German tattoo artist Manfred Kohrs had to take a look backward.″ In 1978 Kohrs "introduced the first new design for a rotary machine in nearly a century. His machine was functionally similar to O'Reilly's except an electric DC motor, rather than electrified magnets, drove the needles. This slimmer and streamlined version became lighter, quieter, and more portable. It also gave artists more control while ensuring the operator's hands and fingers cramped less. While some artists gravitated to this rotary revival, others preferred to stick with their trusty coil machines".

Kohrs tattooed Rio Reiser, Klaus Meine, Rudolf Schenker and other several notable musicians, artists and celebrities of the time.

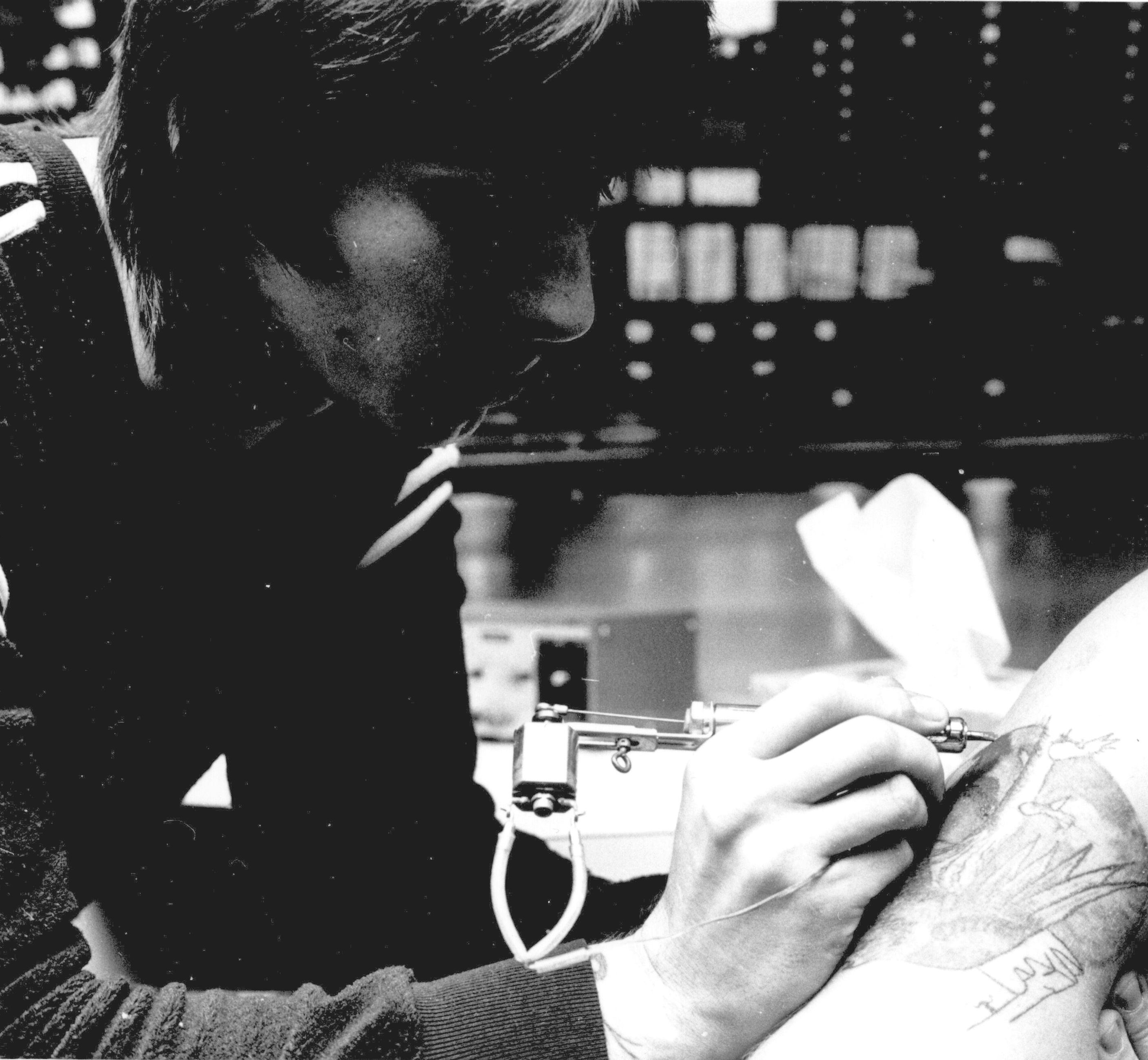
Manfred Kohrs in his studio in 1977

In 1977, Kohrs was an early member of The National Tattoo Club of the World which was renamed 1984 to the National Tattoo Association, (N.T.A.). In the same year Kohrs was the founder-member No. 25 of the European Tattoo Artists Association. In 1977, Kohrs invited all commercially registered tattooists in Germany to an information meeting in Hanover. "At that time there were throughout the country, only 14 self-employed tattoo artist". The purpose of this meeting were the establishment of a national association, and to introduce technical and hygienic standards. At that time, Kohrs and Streckenbach were the only German tattoo artists who used an autoclave for the sterilisation of equipment.

Kohrs attended the first National Convention at the Cosmopolitan Hotel in Denver, Colorado from 23 to 25 March 1979. He made a slide presentation of tattooed people with Tattoo Samy. The speakers on the convention were Terry Wrigley, Peter Tat 2 Poulos, Diane Poulos, Don Ed Hardy, Bob Shaw (who spoke about the importance of using autoclaves and hygiene), Big Walt Kilkucki, Painless Jeff Baker, Dave Yurkew, Arnold Rubin and Jan Stussy. Kohrs, Streckenbach and Terry Wrigley (president of E.T.A.A), were present in October 1980 at the first German Tattoo Convention at Frankfurt. Kohrs gave up tattooing in 1990 and began studying economics in Hanover. Since completing his economics and MBA degree in 1996, he has served as tax consultant and lecturer in economics at a private academy.

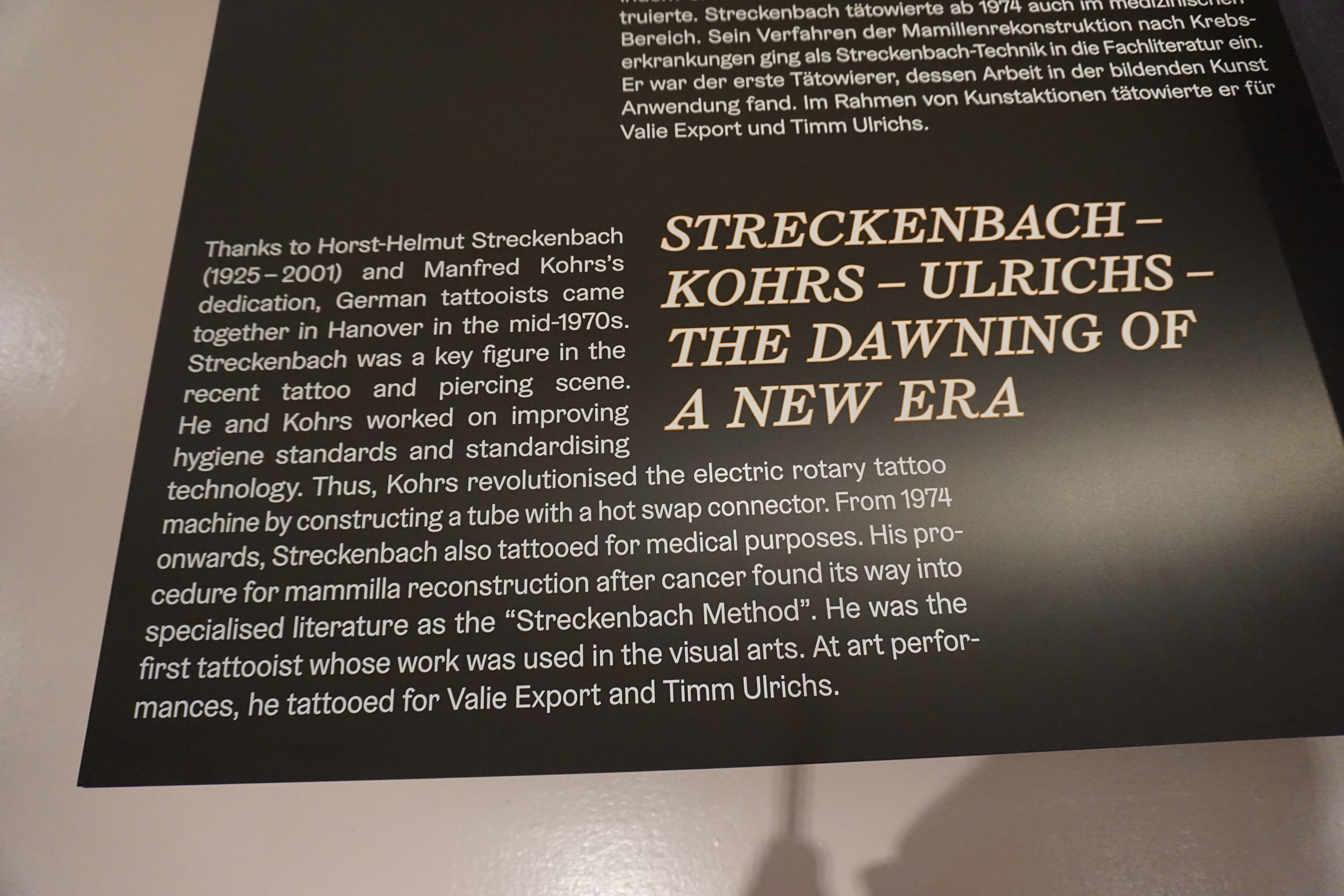
Sonderausstellung Tattoo-Legenden. Christian Warlich auf St. Pauli

In 2016, after more than 45 years, Kohrs appears first again in the tattoo scene, he gave a detailed interview to Stadtkind Hannovermagazin and the Tattoo Kulture Magazine. In December 2016 he visited the exhibition Nailed to the Cross by PMA Tattoo Hanover and November 2017 the 10. tattomenta Kassel. From November 2019, to May 2020, the Museum für Hamburgische Geschichte showed a special exhibition on Christian Warlich with a section on Streckenbach and Kohrs.

=== Military career ===
Kohrs completed his four years of military service as a regular soldier 1977-1981; his last active rank was Staff sergeant at the Aufklärungsgeschwader 51 of the German Air Force.

== Research work ==
Manfred Kohrs is founder and since 1997 chairman of the board of the Institut für deutsche Tätowier-Geschichte, Ole Wittmann executive board member and research director. The non-profit association Institut für deutsche Tätowier-Geschichte e.V. (IDTG) is a close partner of the research and exhibition project Nachlass Warlich. The purpose of the IDTG is to promote science, research, art and culture as well as education and mediation. Since an interdisciplinary approach to tattoo research is of great importance, scientists from different disciplines should be supported in their research on tattoos. The purpose of the statutes is realized by organizing scientific events and research projects on German tattoo history in an international context. The results are to be published in publications and other media in order to make them accessible to a broad public.

Since March 2018, Kohrs has worked as a research associate in the estate project Nachlass Warlich. Since December 2015, Ole Wittmann is a postdoctoral scholarship holder of the Hamburger Stiftung zur Förderung von Wissenschaft und Kultur (Hamburg Foundation for the Promotion of Science and Culture) working on a research project on the estate of the German tattooist Christian Warlich (1891–1964) in cooperation with the Stiftung Historische Museen Hamburg/Museum für Hamburgische Geschichte.

== Documents ==
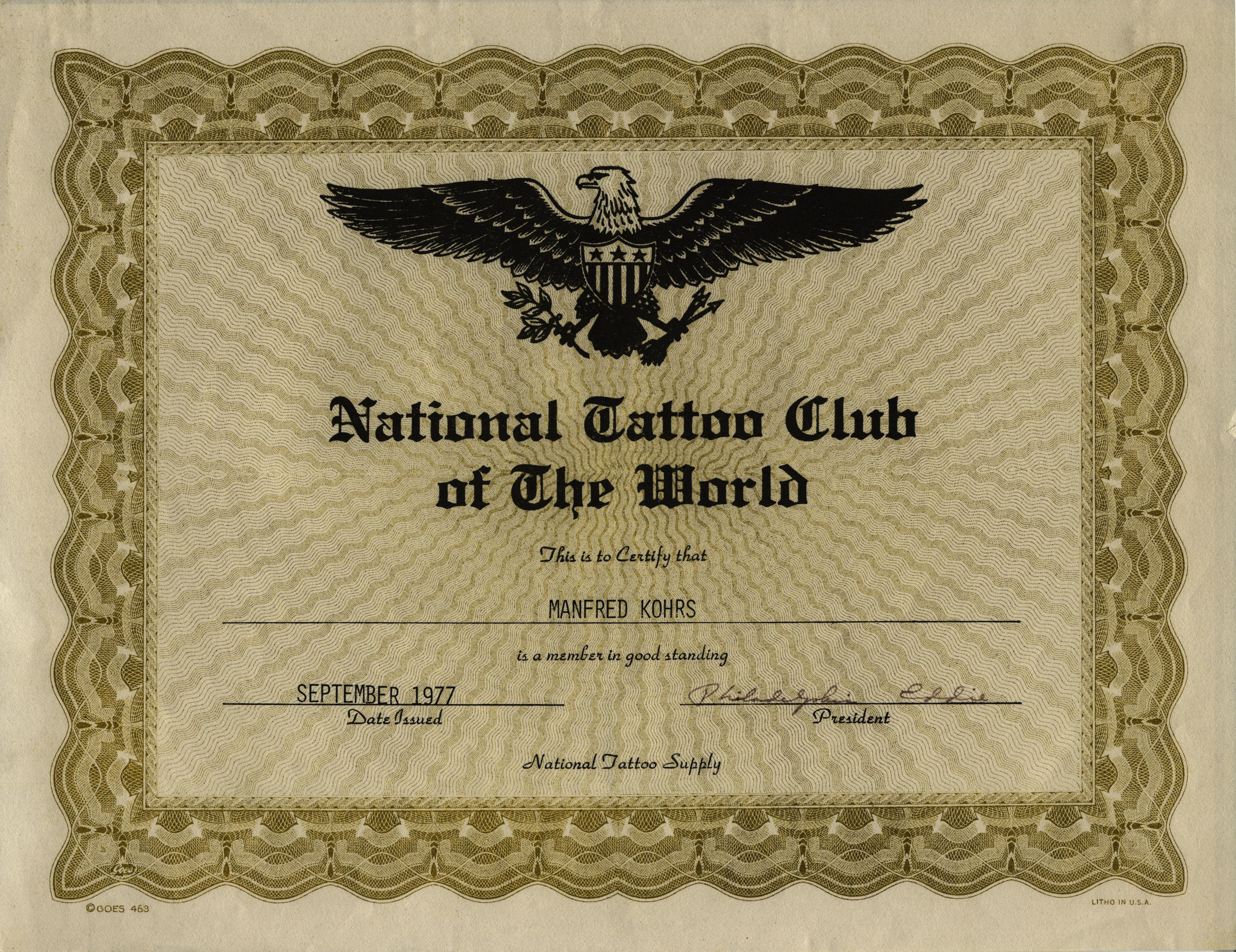
National Tattoo Club of the World, issued from „Philadelphia" Eddie Funk, 1977

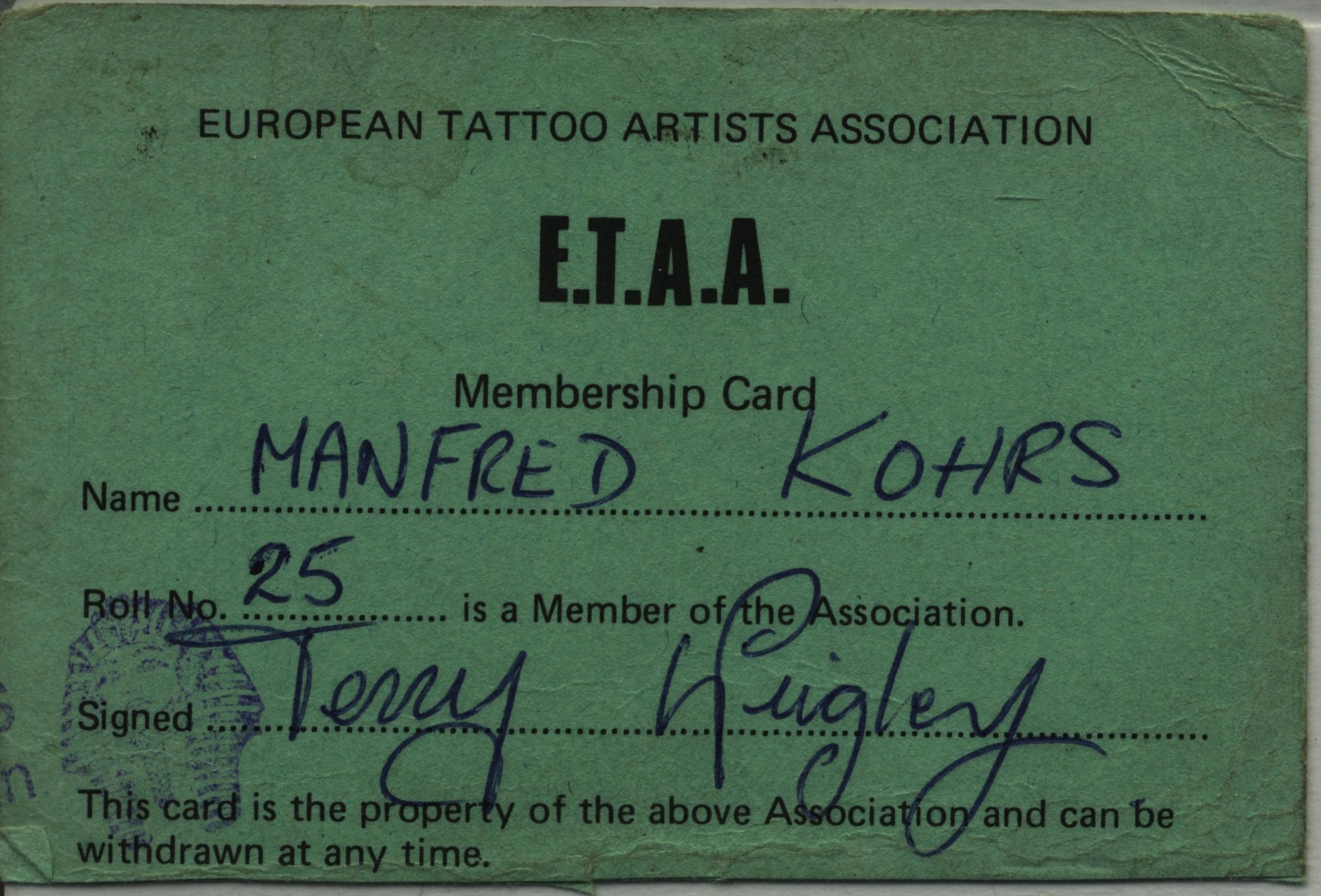
European Tattoo Artist Association, issued from Terry Wrigley 1976

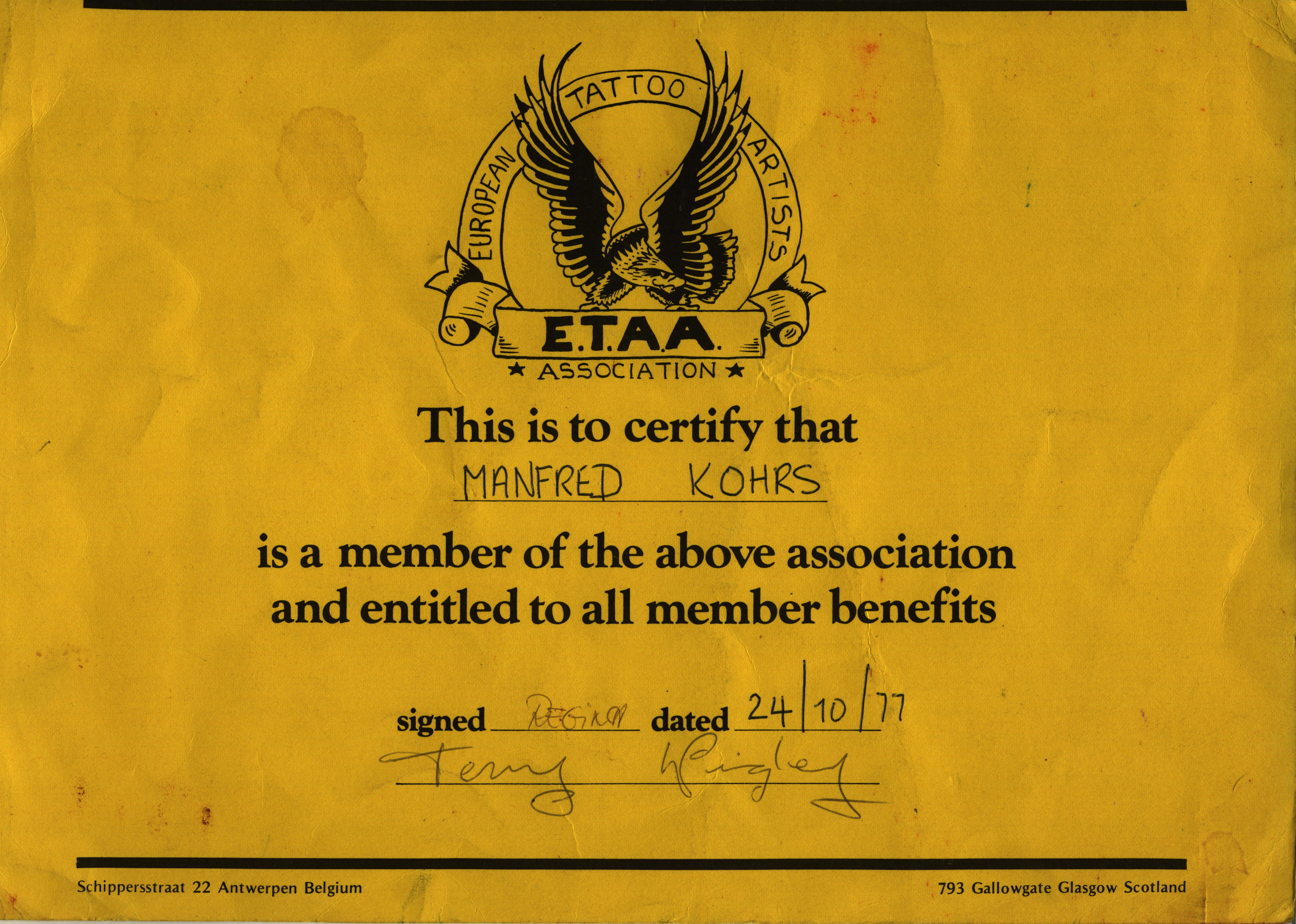
European Tattoo Artist Association, issued from Terry Wrigley 1977

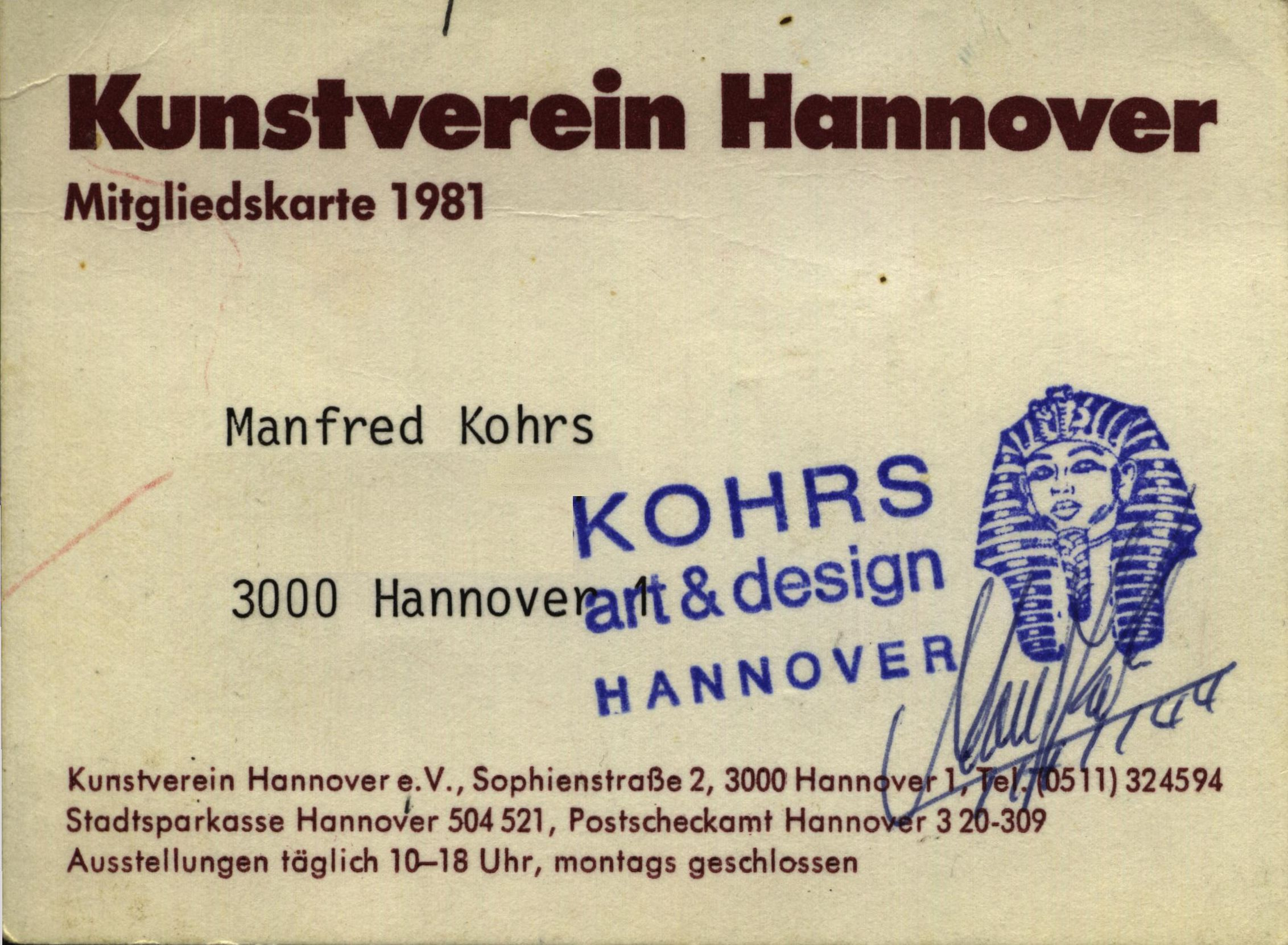
membercard "Kunstverein" Hannover 1981, signed by Kohrs

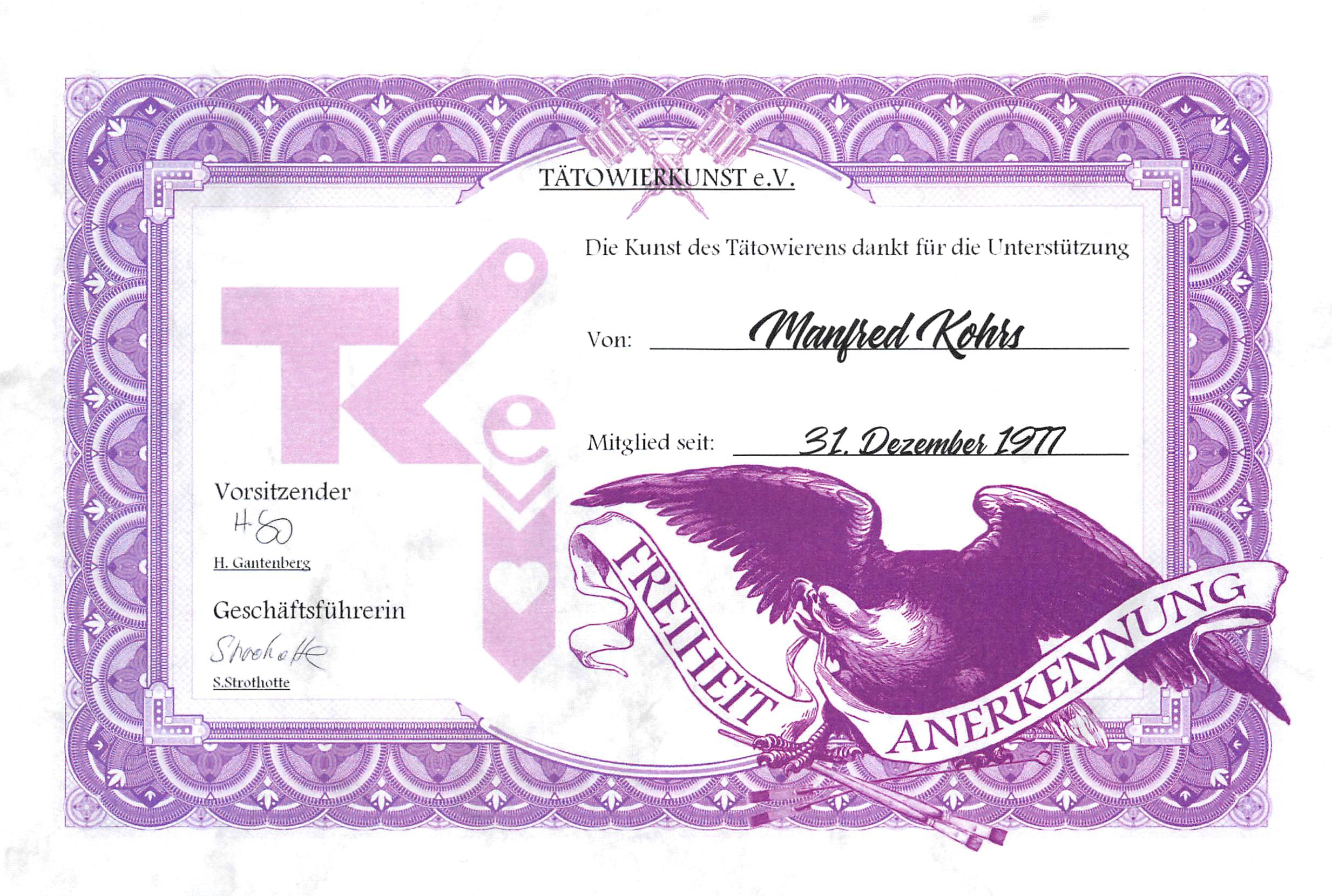
membercard Tätowierkunst e.V. 1977, signed by Heiko Gantenberg, Mia Strothotte

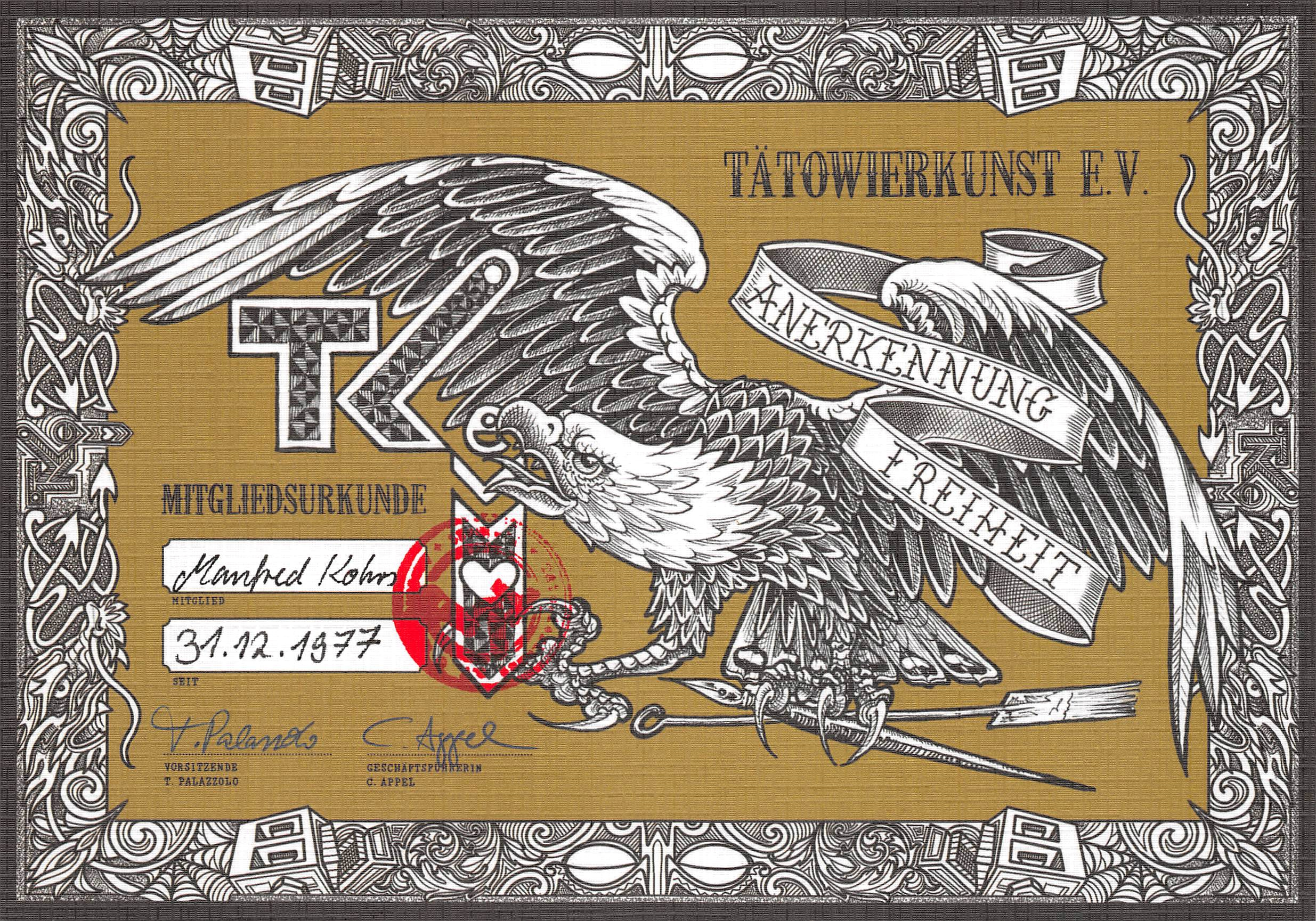
Certificate tätowierkunst e.V., signed by Tanina Palozzolo, Christa Appel, M.A.

== Art and design ==
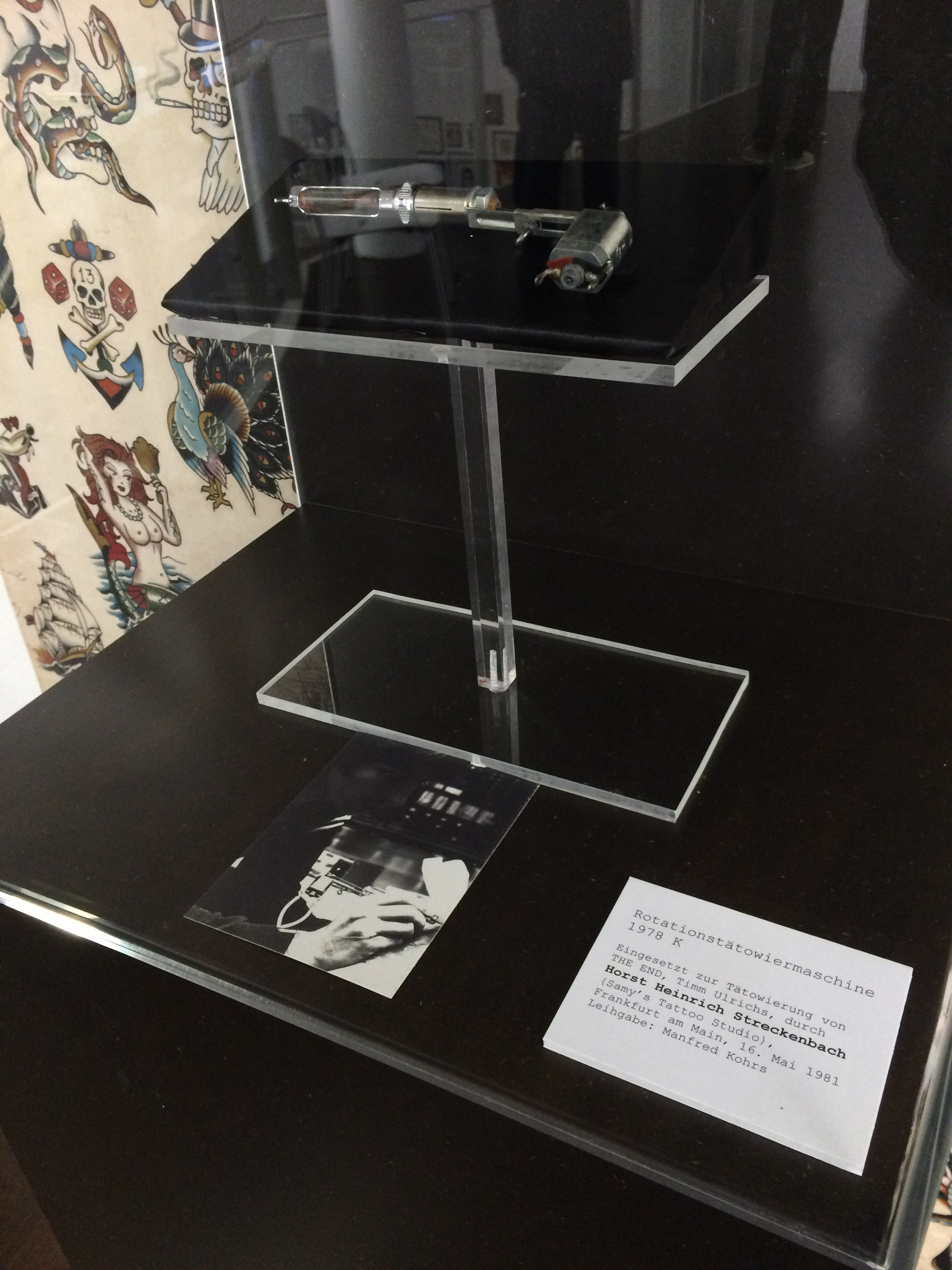
Skin stories - kunst galerie fürth 2015

In 1975, on the German Norddeutscher Rundfunk television show Nordschaumagazin, Kohrs met the well-known German artist Prof. Timm Ulrichs. In 1981, Ulrich was approached about Streckenbach to Manfred Kohrs in Hanover to be tattooed as part of an art project, the words "THE END" refers to an eyelid. In 1981, Streckenbach created that conceptual art-project with Ulrichs.
"Once the moment has finally come when the curtain falls for good, when my eyesight disappears and my eyes are closed for eternal rest, the pulled-down eyelid will reveal as a last, surprising theatrical coup the final punch line, in my view quite memorable: the "Last Picture Show", presented with a weeping and a laughing eye, with a wink, the final performance of a life and a life performance intended to be spectacular and dramatic". Timm Ulrichs From 1977 to 1981, he created Kohrs some individual projects with the topic of tattoos. From 1978 Kohrs drew cartoons for various magazines. From 2000 to 2018 Kohrs was president of the art association in Wedemark, Germany.

The history of the association dates back to 1977, when Manfred Kohrs invited a number of tattoo artists established in Germany - including Horst Streckenbach, Edward Szustak "Tattoo Eddy", Herbert Hoffmann, Heinrich Dietz and Theodor Vetter, as well as Dietmar Gehrer from Switzerland - to an information meeting in Hanover. The purpose of this meeting was to found a national association in order to subsequently introduce technical and hygienic standards. Kohrs founded the National Tattoo Club Germany in 1977, which became the KUNSTverein 2000 Wedemark e. V. in 2000. On 2 December 2018, under the chairmanship of Heiko Gantenberg, the association was renamed Tätowierkunst e. V.. Since the beginning of 2019, there is also the association's web presence, including social media. By March 2021, the association already had over 150 members. These include not only tattoo artists, but also artists, art historians, lawyers and other scientists. Currently, under the chairmanship of Tanina Palozzolo, 263 members are already involved in Tätowierkunst e. V. (as of November 2021).

The Tattoo Machine Manfred Kohrs 1978 K was in 2015 exhibited in a German Art museum.

From 27 November 2019 to 25 May 2020, the Museum für Hamburgische Geschichte showed a special exhibition under the title Tattoo Legends. Christian Warlich on St. Pauli, which was curated by Ole Wittmann. A section of this exhibition shows objects and documents from Kohrs' work as a tattoo artist, including a travel tattoo kit from the early 1970s.

== Publications (in German) ==
- European Tattoo Artist Association 1980 Frankfurt. In: Tattoo Kulture Magazine 51, 28. Mai 2023, p 12–17.
- Tattoo-Clubs und Vereine – Ein europäischer Rückblick" in: Tattoo Kulture Magazine 49, March 2022, p 12–20.
- Elizabeth Weinzirl, the tattoed Grandma in: Tattoo Kulture Magazine 48, December/January 2021/2022, p 12–22. (with a commentary by Jim Ward)
- Die tätowierten Damen der Belle Époque in: Tattoo Kulture Magazine 46, August/September 2021, p 10–25.
- Tätowierungen in der bildenden Kunst des späten 20. Jahrhunderts, in: Tattoo Kulture Magazine 42, January/February 2021, p 24–29.
- Manfred Kohrs and Heiko Gantenberg: Lyle Tuttle – Tattoo-Pioniere im Fort Notch, in: Tattoo Kulture Magazine 38, May/June 2020, p 38–47.
- From the Past – First US-Tattoo Convention Houston/Texas 1976, in: Tattoo Kulture Magazine 37, March/April 2020, p 88–89.
- Die Tattoo-Forscher, in: Tattoo Kulture Magazine 35, issue 6, November/December 2019, p 22–28.
- Streckenbach, Mentor der Tattoo-Jugend, in: Tattoo Kulture Magazine 34, issue 5, September/October 2019, p 26–32.
- Hüter des verlorenen Schatzes – Herry Nentwig, in: Tattoo Kulture Magazine 33, issue 4, July/August 2019, p 22–32.
- Der vergessene Pionier – Horst H. Streckenbach. Tattoo-Samy, in: Tattoo Kulture Magazine 32, issue 3, May/June 2019, p 28–40.

== Bibliography ==
- Manfred Kohrs, Ole Wittmann (Publ.): From the Living Room to Far-off Lands – Tattoo Culture in the Mid-20th Century. IDTG, Wedemark 2025, ISBN 978-3-00-076184-3 (german and english)
- Manfred Kohrs – Geschichte machen, Geschichte schreiben, in: Paul-Henri Campbell: Tattoo & Religion. Die bunten Kathedralen des Selbst. Wunderhorn, Heidelberg 2019, p 86–95, ISBN 3-88-423606-7
- Tätowier-Vorlagenbuch: Großbritannien/Schottland um 1920. IKARUS, Wedemark 2023, ISBN 3-00-076408-9 (german and english)
- Vorlagenalbum des Tätowierers Horst "Tattoo-Samy" Streckenbach. IKARUS, Wedemark 2024, ISBN 3-00-076502-6
- TATTOO-HISTORY No.1 -Tattoo-Artists go Public-. IKARUS, Wedemark 2025 ISBN 978-3-911819-00-8 (german and english)

== Movie ==
- 1975: Tatueringar är tvättäkta

== See also ==
- List of tattoo artists

=== Selected bibliography ===
- Björn Brocks: Abnorm (Hannover-Krimi). Niemeyer, Hameln 2011, ISBN 3-8271-9452-0.
- François Chauvin: Mondial du tatouage Hors Collection Loisirs. Hachette Pratique 2018, ISBN 2-01-625602-8, p. 15.
- Samuel M. Steward: Bad Boys and Tough Tattoos. Routledge London & New York 1990, ISBN 0-918393-76-0.
- Margot Mifflin: Bodies of Subversion. powerHouse Books 2013, ISBN 1-576-87692-6.
- Caroline Rosenthal, Dirk Vanderbeke: Probing the Skin: Cultural Representations of Our Contact Zone. Cambridge Scholars Publishing 2015, ISBN 1-443-87518-X.
- Paul-Henri Campbell: Tattoo & Religion. Die bunten Kathedralen des Selbst. (Interviews) p. 86 – 95: Manfred Kohrs – Geschichte machen, Geschichte schreiben, Heidelberg 2019, ISBN 978-3-88423-606-2.
