= Ole Wittmann =

German art historian, curator and publisher

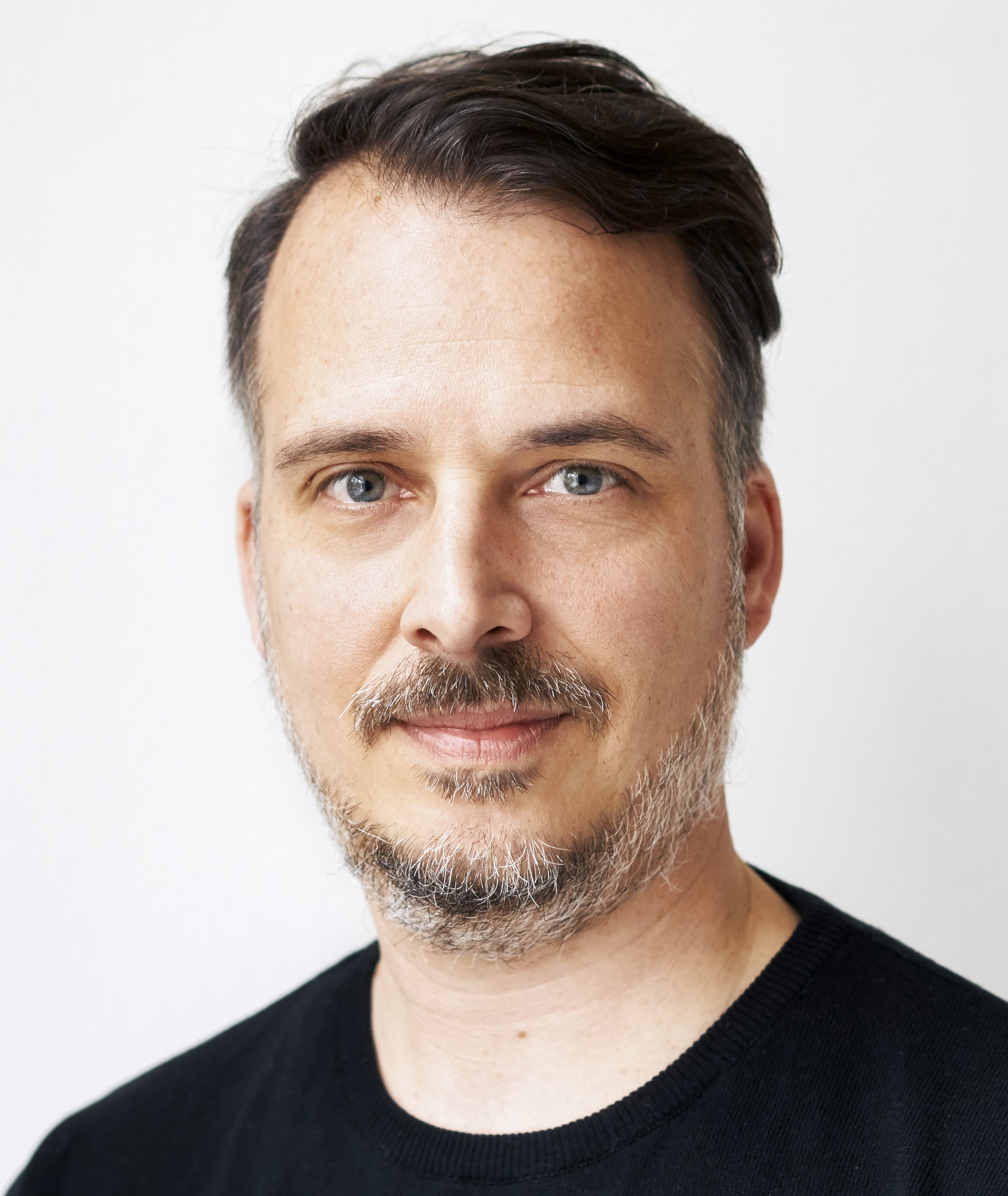
- Born: 31 August 1977 (age 48); Henstedt-Ulzburg, West Germany (now Germany)
- Occupations: art historian and curator

Ole Wittmann (born 31 August 1977) is a German art historian, curator and publisher. He is specialized in the role of tattooing in art. His research on the German tattoo history of the late 19th and 20th century is considered pioneering. He has written the first German doctoral thesis on tattooing and art and his research has generated considerable media interest.

== Biographical and career information ==
Wittmann was born in Henstedt-Ulzburg. He studied art history at the University of Hamburg and has been a visiting lecturer there. He worked for the Arno Schmidt Stiftung from 2009 to 2012 and was involved in the conception of the exhibition 'Tattoo' (2015) at the Museum für Kunst und Gewerbe Hamburg.

His doctoral thesis Tattoos in der Kunst is concerned with material specific aspects and the iconology of tattoos, he received his Ph.D. in 2017.

Since December 2015, Wittmann is a postdoctoral scholarship holder of the Hamburger Stiftung zur Förderung von Wissenschaft und Kultur (Hamburg Foundation for the Promotion of Science and Culture) working on a research project on the estate of the German tattooist Christian Warlich (1891–1964) in cooperation with the Stiftung Historische Museen Hamburg/Museum für Hamburgische Geschichte.

Wittmann is the founder and owner of the company Nachlass Warlich. He is an executive board member and research director of the nonprofit organisation Institut für deutsche Tätowier-Geschichte e.V. (IDTG) since 2018. Wittmann is the curator of the exhibition "Tattoo-Legenden. Christian Warlich auf St. Pauli" (2019/20) at the Museum für Hamburgische Geschichte.

== Honours ==
The book Karl Finke: Buch No. 3 was edited and published by Wittmann in 2019 and was awarded bronze by the Art Directors Club für Deutschland e.V. (ADC) and won the German Design Award.

== Bibliography ==
- Manfred Kohrs, Ole Wittmann (Publ.): From the Living Room to Far-off Lands – Tattoo Culture in the Mid-20th Century. IDTG, Wedemark 2025, ISBN 978-3-00-076184-3 (german and english)
- Tattoos in der Kunst Materialität – Motive – Rezeption Reimer Verlag 2007, ISBN 978-3-496-01569-7
- Karl Finke: Buch No. 3. Ein Vorlagealbum des Hamburger Tätowierers. ISBN 978-3-000-56648-6
  - Contributions in: Friedman, Anna Felicity: The World Atlas of Tattoo. Yale University Press, New Haven 2015, ISBN 0-300-2104-85, Page 182; 185-186; 188.
  - Tattoo-Legenden. In: Hamburg History Live, Nr. 2, 2016, Page 16–21. (in German)
  - Scham entblößen. Damien Hirsts Tattoo-Arbeit butterfly, divided. In: Inga Klein/Nadine Mai/Rostislav Tumanov (Ed.): Hüllen und Enthüllungen. (Un-)Sichtbarkeiten aus kulturwissenschaftlicher Perspektive, Berlin: Reimer 2017 (=Schriftenreihe der Isa Lohmann-Siems Stiftung, Vol. 10), p. 104–126.
  - Werkalterung und Umrisslinie: Zur Unschärfe von Tattoos. In: Iris Därmann/Thomas Macho (Ed.): Unter die Haut. Tätowierungen als Logo- und Piktogramme, Paderborn: Wilhelm Fink 2017, p. 179–208.

=== Selected bibliography ===
- Heim, Heide: Der Heilige Gral, TätowierMagazin, Nr. 248, Jg. 22, Oktober 2016, Page 74-83. (in German)
- Coenen, Andreas: „Warlich – Finke – Wittmann. Auf den Wegen der Hamburger Tattoo-Tradition" [Interview mit Ole Wittmann], in: Tattoo Kulture Magazine 21, Issue 4, July/August 2017, p. 30–38.

== See also ==
- Christian Warlich
