= Herbert Hoffmann =

German tattoo artist and photographer

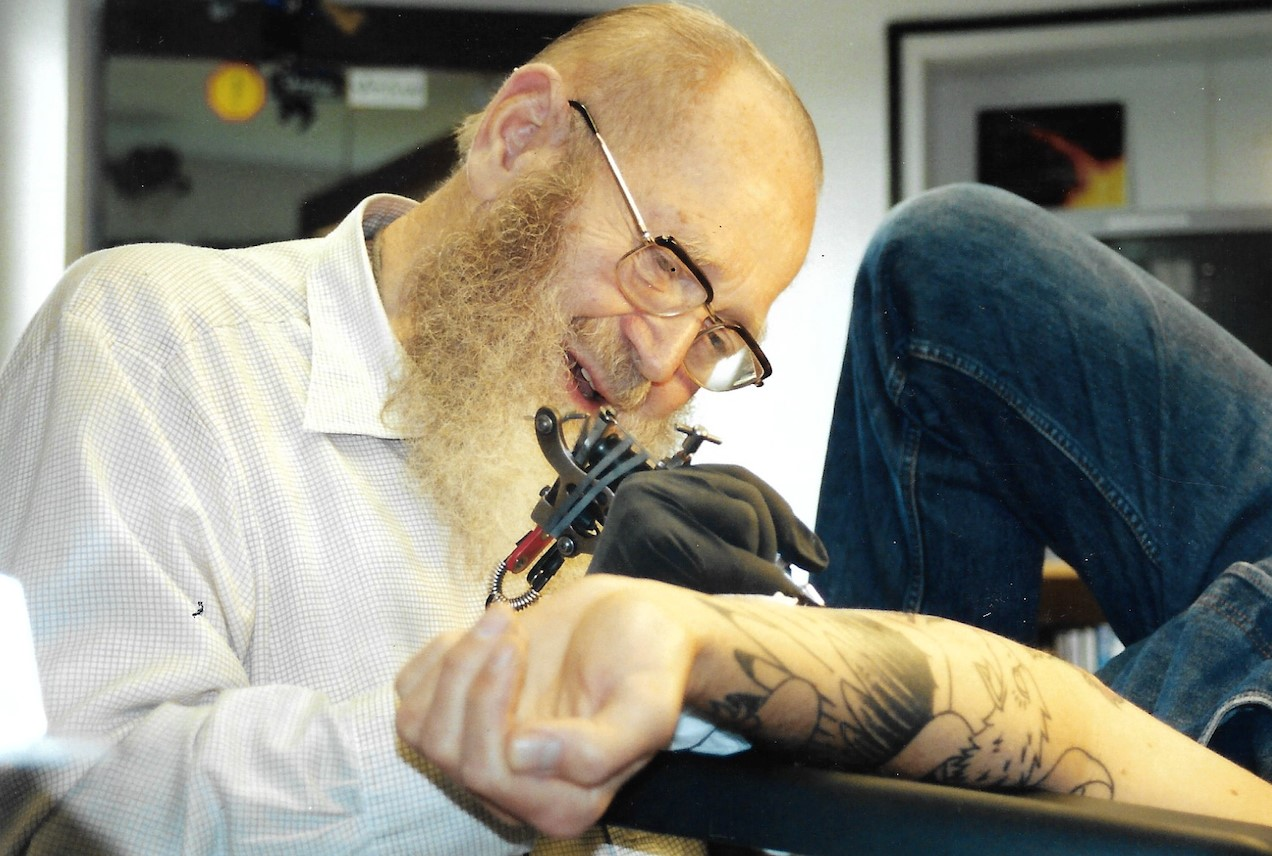
- Hoffmann in 2004
- Born: December 30, 1919
- Died: June 30, 2010 (aged 90)
- Occupations: Tattoo artist and photographer
- Website: www.herberthoffmann.net

Herbert Hoffmann (December 30, 1919 – June 30, 2010) was a German tattoo artist and photographer.

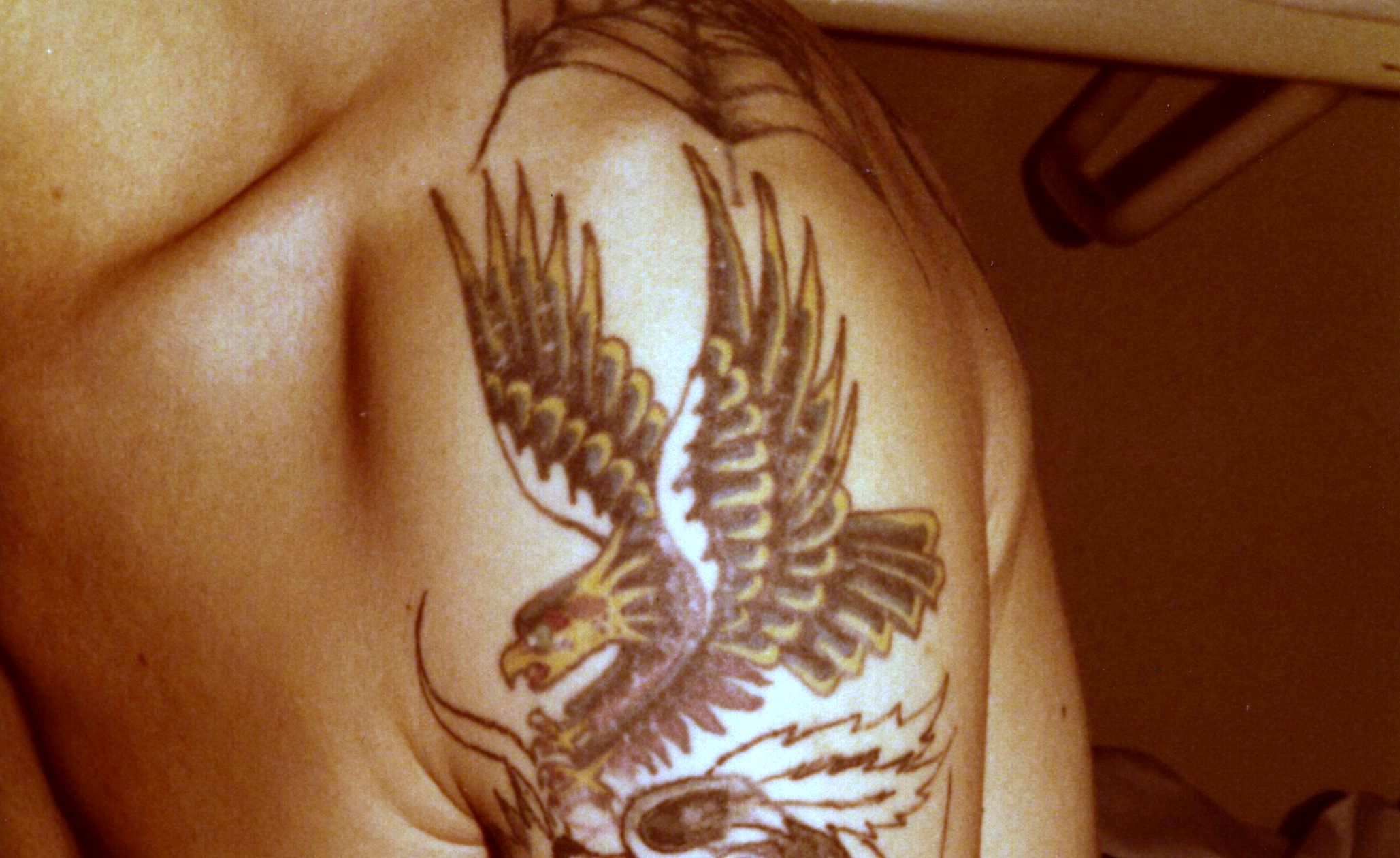
Eagle made by Hoffmann, 1975

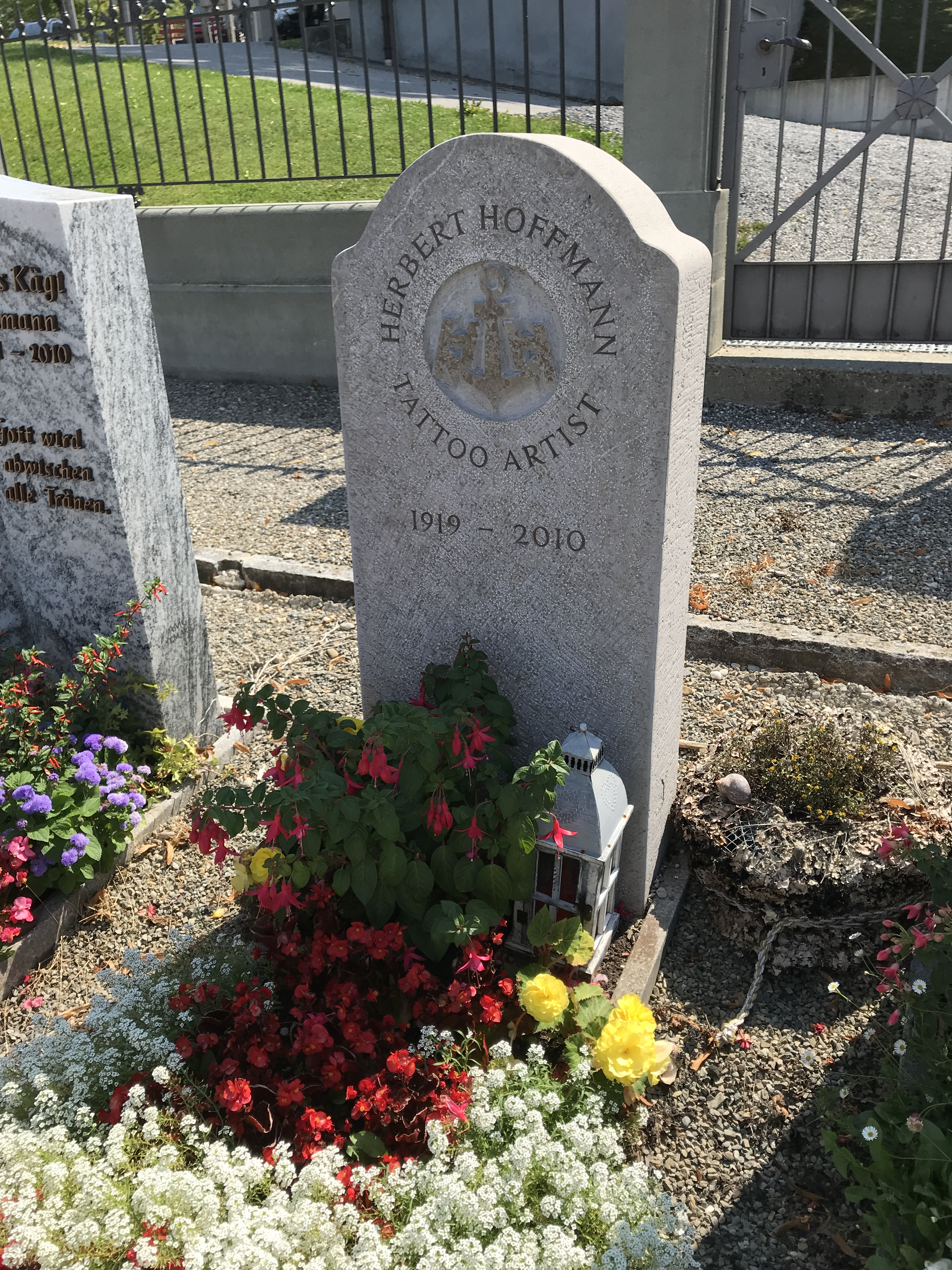
Hoffmann's grave in Heiden, 2018

== Biography ==
Hoffmann was born December 30, 1919 in Freienwalde, Pomerania. He died on June 30, 2010 in Heiden, Switzerland.

== Hoffmann as photographer ==
From 1961 Hoffmann produced professional photographic works in his Hamburg tattoo studio. Thus Herbert Hoffmann portrayed almost 400 tattoos within three decades with a Rolleiflex, born between 1878 and 1952.

His photographic work has been represented by Galerie Gebr. Lehmann since 2004.

"The portraits are staged with great formal care and seriousness. The result is the image of a subculture that has its roots in the gay scene and among sailors and dock workers, but which goes far beyond it."

- ELKE BUHR, MONOPOL-MAGAZIN 2018

=== solo exhibitions (selection) ===
- 2018: Es juckt schon wieder unter dem Fell, Kunst Halle Sankt Gallen, St. Gallen
- 2013: Herbert Hoffmann, Künstlerverein Malkasten, Düsseldorf
- 2011: Herbert Hoffmann, Galerie Susanne Zander, Köln
- 2010: St. Pauli Souvenirs, Galerie Gebr. Lehmann, Berlin
- 2010: Living Pictures, Ten Haaf Projects, Amsterdam
- 2006: Unter die Haut – Fotografie und Tatauierkunst des Herbert Hoffmann, Museum für Völkerkunde Dresden
- 2004: Glaube – Liebe – Hoffnung, Galerie Gebr. Lehmann, Dresden

=== group exhibitions (selection) ===
- 2018: Tattoo, Natural History Museum, Los Angeles
- 2017: Freimütig, Galerie Gebr. Lehmann, Dresden
- 2017: Tattoo und Piercing – Die Welt unter der Haut, Grassi Museum für Völkerkunde, Leipzig
- 2016: Tattoo, Field Museum of Natural History, Chicago
- 2016: Tattoos: Ritual. Identity. Obsession. Art., Royal Ontario Museum, Toronto
- 2015: Tattoo, Museum für Kunst und Gewerbe Hamburg
- 2014: Bielefeld Contemporary, Zeitgenössische Kunst aus Bielefelder Privatsammlungen, Bielefelder Kunstverein, Bielefeld
- 2014: Tatoueurs, tatoués, Musée du quai Branly, Paris
- 2014: Intimität, Galerie der Stadt Remscheid, Remscheid
- 2013: 25, Galerie Gebr. Lehmann, Berlin
- 2013: Tattoo, Gewerbemuseum Winterthur, Winterthur
- 2013: the look behind, Märkisches Museum (Witten)
- 2013: Hey! modern art & pop culture / Part II, Halle Saint Pierre, Paris
- 2012: c´est la vie – Das ganze Leben, Deutsches Hygiene-Museum, Dresden
- 2011: HotSpot Berlin – Eine Momentaufnahme, Georg Kolbe Museum, Berlin
- 2010: Auf Leben und Tod – der Mensch in Malerei und Fotografie. Die Sammlung Teutloff zu Gast, Wallraf-Richartz-Museum & Fondation Corboud, Köln
- 2010: Weisser Schimmel–You can observe a lot by watching, Sammlung Falckenberg, Hamburg
- 2010: Nude Visions – 150 Jahre Körperbilder in der Fotografie, Museum der bildenden Künste, Leipzig
- 2008: transgressive body/ reincarnated flesh, Artspace Tape Modern, Berlin
- 2006: Mensch! Photographien aus Dresdner Sammlungen, Kupferstichkabinett Dresden, Staatliche Kunstsammlungen Dresden
- 2006: Signs & Surfaces – Andreas Fux, Herbert Hoffmann, Ali Kepenek, Künstlerhaus Bethanien, Berlin
- 2005: YES YES YES YES. Differenz und Wiederholung in Bildern der Sammlung Olbricht, Museum Morsbroich, Leverkusen

== Literature ==
- Bilderbuchmenschen. Tätowierte Passionen 1878–1952, Published by Memoria Pulp, 1st Edition 2002, German/English ISBN 978-3-929670-33-2
- Traditionelle Tattoo-Motive, Published by Huber Verlag, Mannheim, 1st Edition 2008 (together with Dirk-Boris Rödel), ISBN 978-3-927896-27-7
- Motivtafeln – Hamburger Tätowierungen von 1950 bis 1965, Published by Ventil Verlag, 2000, ISBN 978-3-930559-76-3
