= History of tattooing =

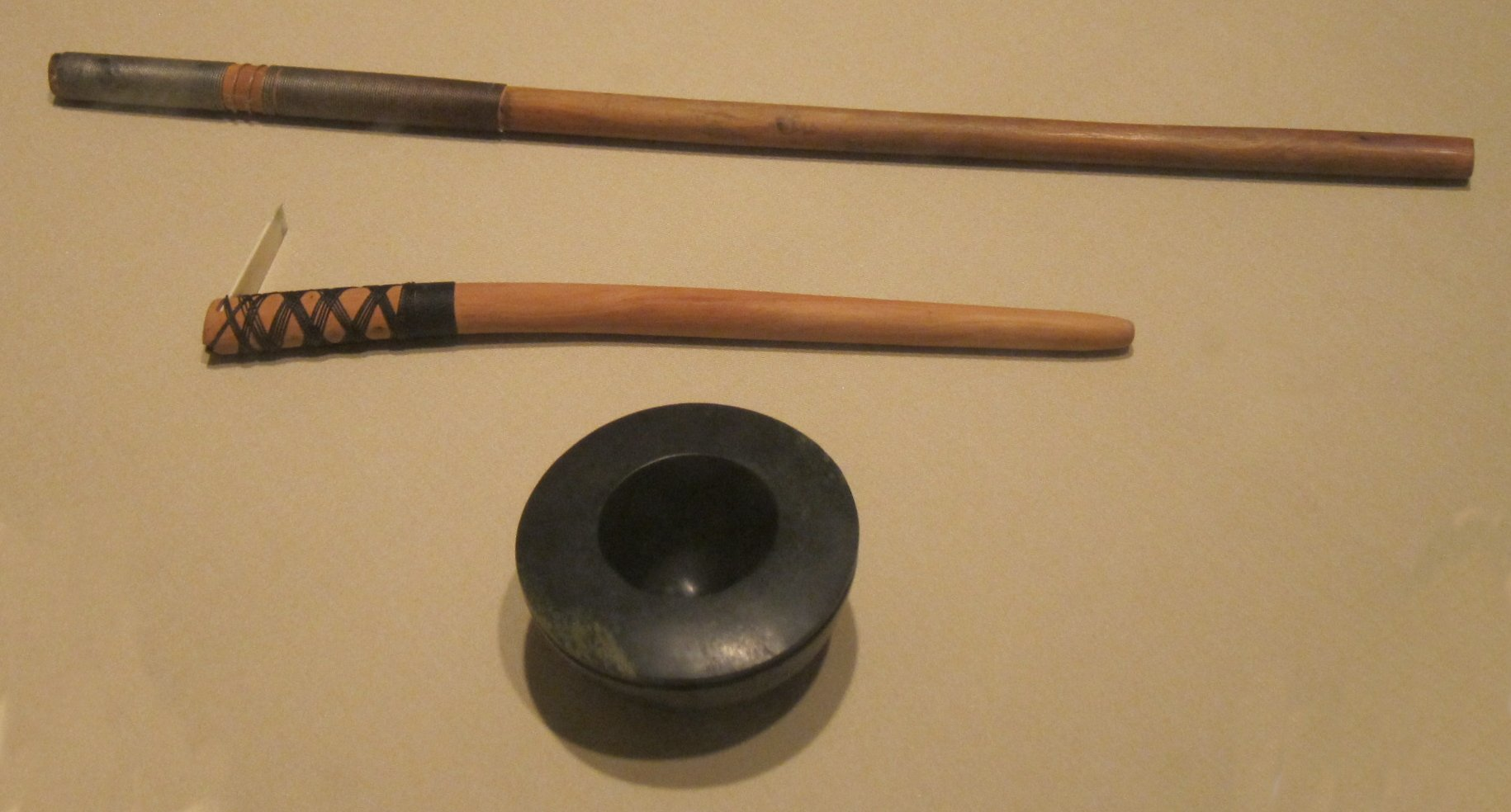
Hawaiian traditional tattoo instrument, mallet, and ink bowl

Tattooing has been a global practice for thousands of years, likely since the Neolithic era. Archeological evidence of the practice of tattooing, such as preserved skin markings, has been found along with traditional tools. This evidence of the practice of tattooing has been found in many different places including with evidence of preserved markings from Greenland, Alaska, Siberia, Mongolia, western China, Japan, Egypt, Sudan, Ethiopia, Nigeria, Europe, the Philippines, and the Andes. Tattoos served different purposes: as spiritual protection, medicinal therapy, the declaration of social status, and tribal affiliation among other things. Across Oceania, tattooing was performed using traditional hand-tapping methods that have remained largely unchanged for over 2,000 years. In parts of East Asia and the Americas, the cultural role of tattooing has varied, at times representing the high status of warriors and religious leaders while at other times being used as a punitive symbol.

== Ancient practices ==
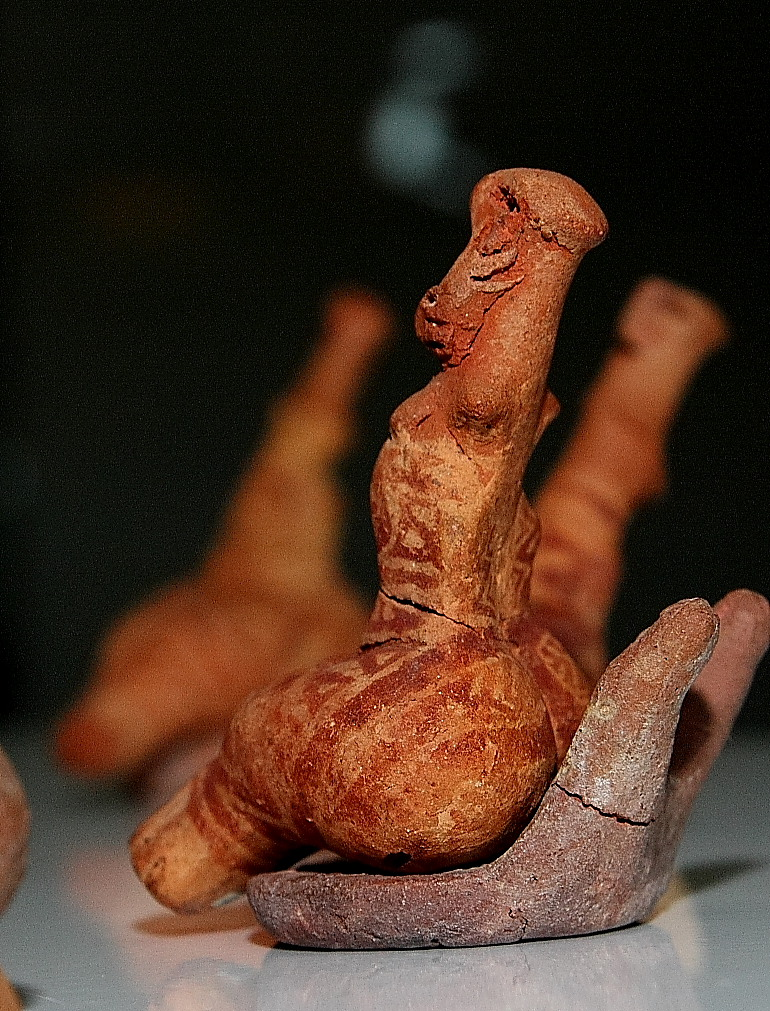
Pre-Cucuteni culture clay figure from Romania, c. 4900–4750 BCE

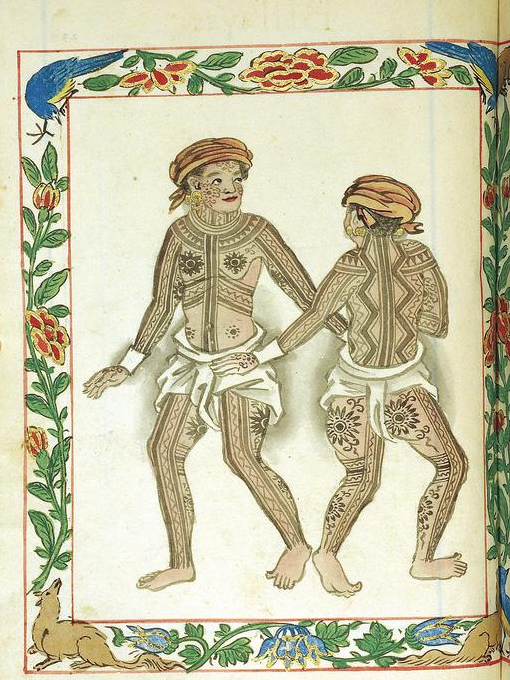
Spanish depiction of the tattoos (patik) of the Visayan Pintados ("the painted ones") of the Philippines in the Boxer Codex (c. 1590), one of the earliest depictions of native Austronesian tattoos by European explorers

Both ancient art and archaeological finds of possible tattoo tools suggest tattooing was practiced by the Upper Paleolithic period in Europe. However, direct evidence for tattooing human skin extends only to the 4th millennium BCE (between 3370 and 3100 BCE). The earliest direct evidence of tattooing is found on the ancestor known as Ötzi (c. 3370–3100 BCE). Examples of tattooed individuals also include Amunet a priestess of Hathor from Deir el-Bahari, as well as the Princess of Ukok from the Altai Mountains. A 2015 scientific re-assessment confirmed Ötzi as the earliest known individual with tattoos. According to ancient stories the semi-mythical philosopher Pythagoras, the seer Zalmoxis and philosopher Epimenides all had tattooed skin. The ancient Greeks viewed tattooing negatively, associating with northern barbarians. In 2018, the world's oldest figurative tattoos were identified on two individuals from Egypt, dated between 3351 and 3017 BCE. In the Americas, the earliest evidence of the practice is found on a man from the Chinchorro culture in present-day Chile, who bears a delicate, mustache-like dotted line above the upper lip (dated to 2563–1972 BCE). Tattooing was widely practiced among the Austronesian people and Austronesian tattooing tools involving the perpendicular hafting of points and the use of a mallet (commonly known as hand-tapping) were already in use by Pre-Austronesians in Taiwan and coastal South China prior to at least 1500 BCE, before the Austronesian expansion into the islands of the Indo-Pacific. It may have originally been associated with headhunting. Tattooing traditions, including facial tattooing, can be found among all Austronesian subgroups, including Taiwanese Aborigines, Islander Southeast Asians, Micronesians, Polynesians, and the Malagasy people. For the most part Austronesians used characteristic perpendicularly hafted tattooing points that were tapped on the handle with a length of wood (called the "mallet") to drive the tattooing points into the skin. The handle and mallet were generally made of wood while the points, either single, grouped or arranged to form a comb were made of Citrus thorns, fish bone, bone, teeth, and turtle and oyster shells.

Ancient tattooing traditions have also been documented among Papuans and Melanesians, with their use of distinctive obsidian skin piercers. Some archeological sites with these implements are associated with the Austronesian migration into Papua New Guinea and Melanesia. But other sites are older than the Austronesian expansion, being dated to around 1650 to 2000 BCE, suggesting that there was a preexisting tattooing tradition in the region. Among other ethnic groups, tattooing was also traditionally practiced among the Ainu people of Japan; some Austroasians of Indochina; Berber women of Tamazgha (North Africa); the Yoruba, Fulani and Hausa people of Nigeria; Makonde of Kenya, Native Americans of the Pre-Columbian Americas; the Welsh and Picts of Iron Age Britain; and Paleo-Balkan peoples (Illyrians and Thracians, as well as Daunians in Apulia), a tradition that has been preserved in the western Balkans by Albanians (Albanian traditional tattooing), Catholics in Bosnia and Herzegovina (Sicanje), and women of some Vlach communities.

== Traditional practices by regions ==
=== The Americas ===
==== North America ====
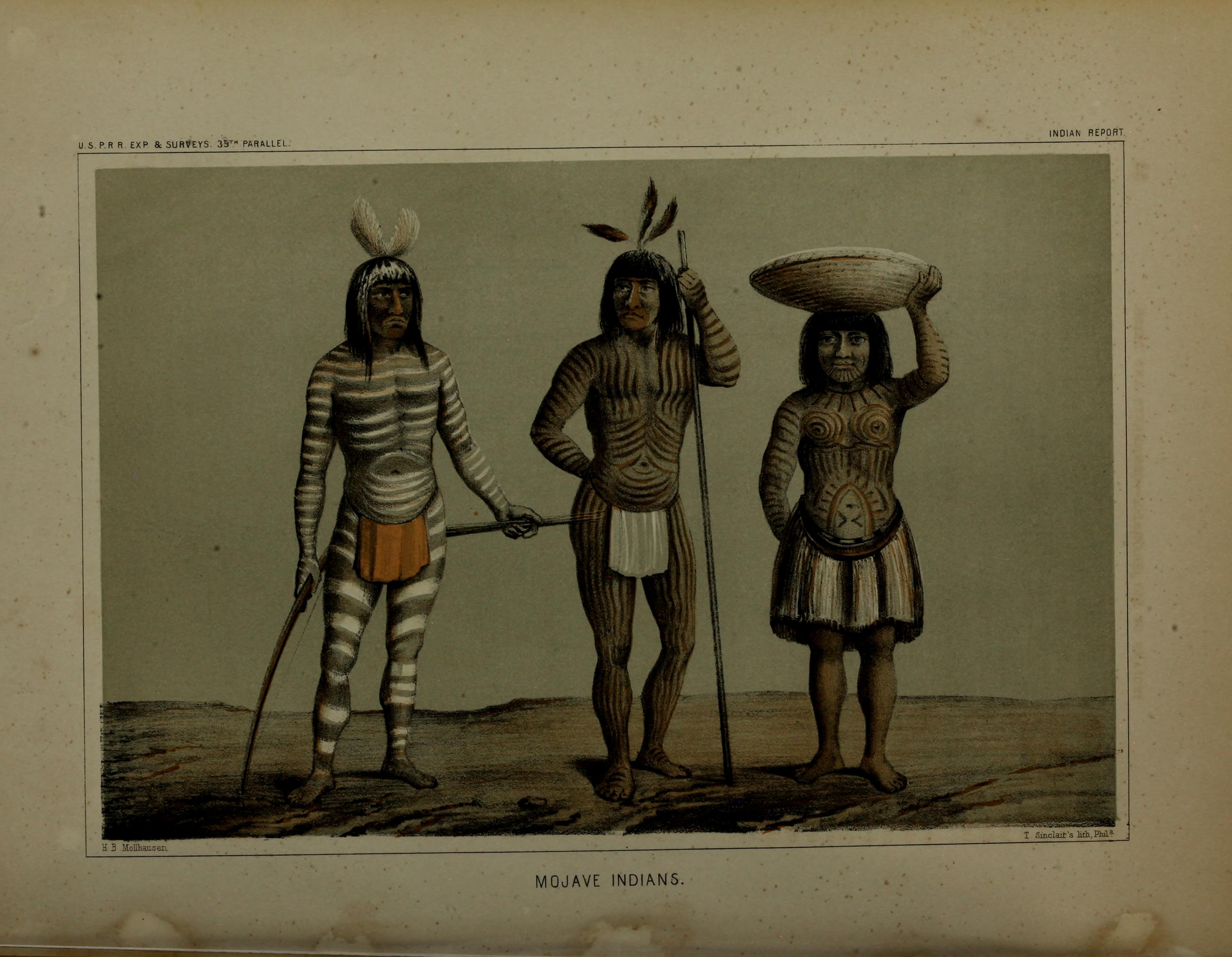
Mojave Indigenous people circa 1855 with markings on their bodies

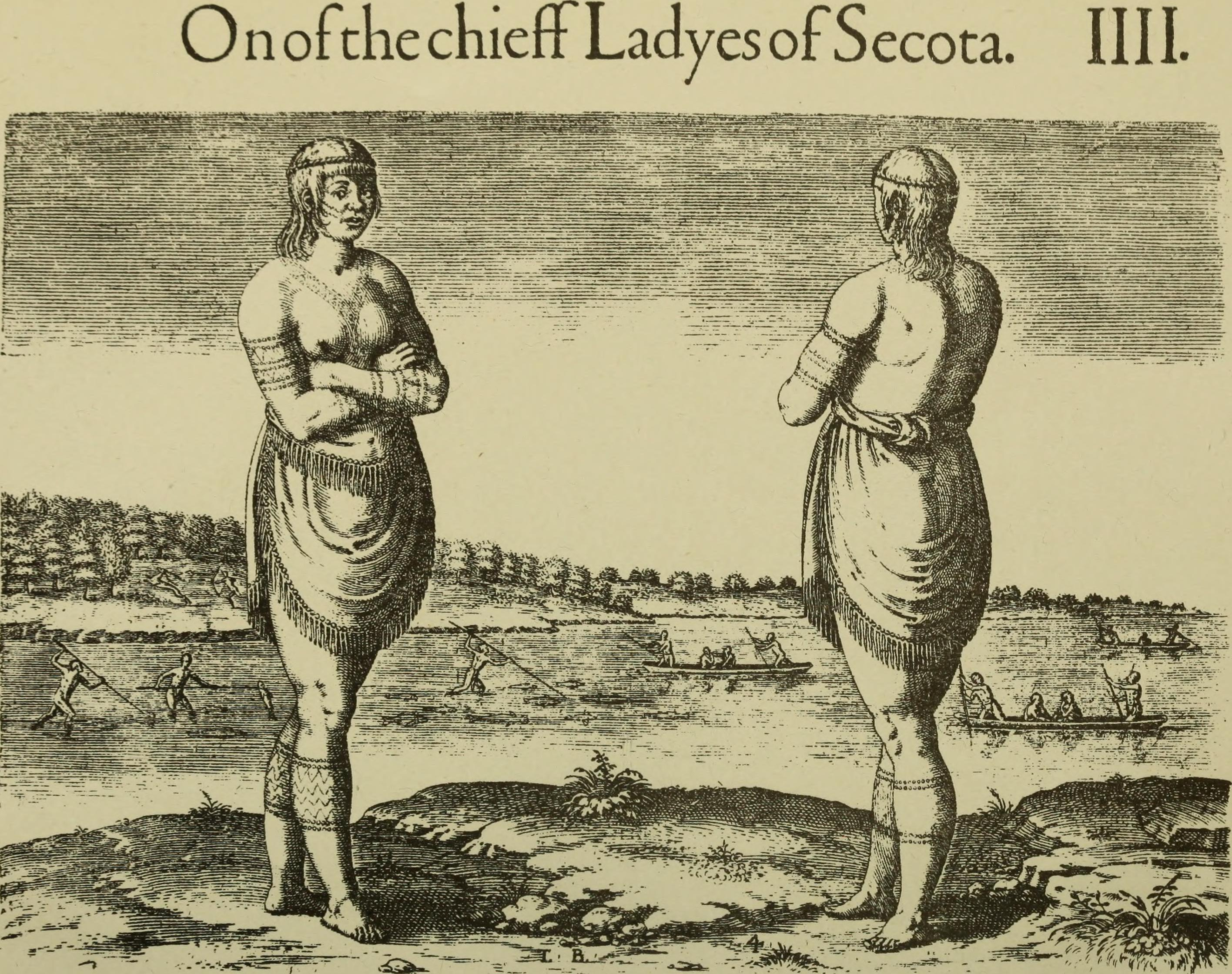
A page from Thomas Harriot's book A Brief and True Report of the New Found Land of Virginia showing a painting by John White. Markings on the skin represent tattoos that were observed.

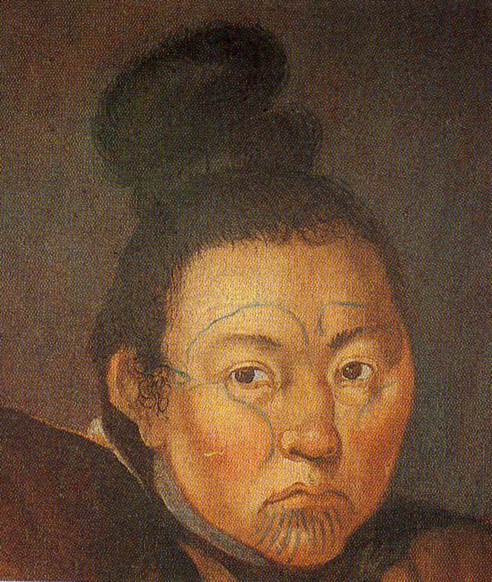
Painting of an Inuk woman with tattoos on her face

Indigenous peoples of North America have a long history of tattooing. Tattooing was not a simple marking on the skin: it was a process that highlighted cultural connections to Indigenous ways of knowing and viewing the world, as well as connections to family, society, and place. There is no way to determine the actual origin of tattooing for Indigenous people of North America. The oldest known physical evidence of tattooing in North America was made through the discovery of a frozen, mummified, Inuk female on St. Lawrence Island, Alaska who had tattoos on her skin. Through radiocarbon dating of the tissue, scientists estimated that the female came from the 16th century. Until recently, archeologists have not prioritized the classification of tattoo implements when excavating known historic sites. Recent review of materials found from the Mound Q excavation site point towards elements of tattoo bundles that are from pre-colonization times. Scholars explain that the recognition of tattoo implements is significant because it highlights the cultural importance of tattooing for Indigenous People.

Early explorers to North America made many ethnographic observations about the Indigenous people they met. Initially, they did not have a word for tattooing and instead described the skin modifications as "pounce, prick, list, mark, and raze" to "stamp, paint, burn, and embroider". In 1585–1586, Thomas Harriot, who was part of the Grenville Expedition, was responsible for making observations about Indigenous People of North America. In A Brief and True Report of the New Found Land of Virginia, Harriot recorded that some Indigenous people had their skin dyed and coloured. John White provided visual representations of Indigenous people in the form of drawings and paintings. Harriot and White also provided information highlighting specific markings seen on Indigenous chiefs during that time. In 1623, Gabriel Sagard was a missionary who described seeing men and women with tattoos on their skin. The Jesuit Relations of 1652 describes tattooing among the Petun and the Neutrals, including a description of the process of using needles or thorns to perforate the skin, such as in the figure of an animal, and apply powdered charcoal to imprint an indelible image. From 1712 to 1717, Joseph François Lafitau, another Jesuit missionary, recorded how Indigenous people were applying tattoos to their skin and developed healing strategies in tattooing the jawline to treat toothaches. Indigenous people had determined that certain nerves that were along the jawline connected to certain teeth, thus by tattooing those nerves, it would stop them from firing signals that led to toothaches. Some of these early ethnographic accounts questioned the actual practice of tattooing and hypothesized that it could make people sick due to unsanitary approaches. Scholars explain that the study of Indigenous tattooing is relatively new as it was initially perceived as behaviour for societies outside of the norm. The process of colonization introduced new views of what acceptable behaviour included, leading to the near erasure of the tattoo tradition for many nations. However, through oral traditions, the information about tattoos and the actual practice of tattooing has persisted to present day. St. Lawrence Iroquoians had used bones as tattooing needles. In addition, turkey bone tattooing tools were discovered at an ancient Fernvale, Tennessee site, dated back to 3500–1600 BCE.

===== Inuit =====
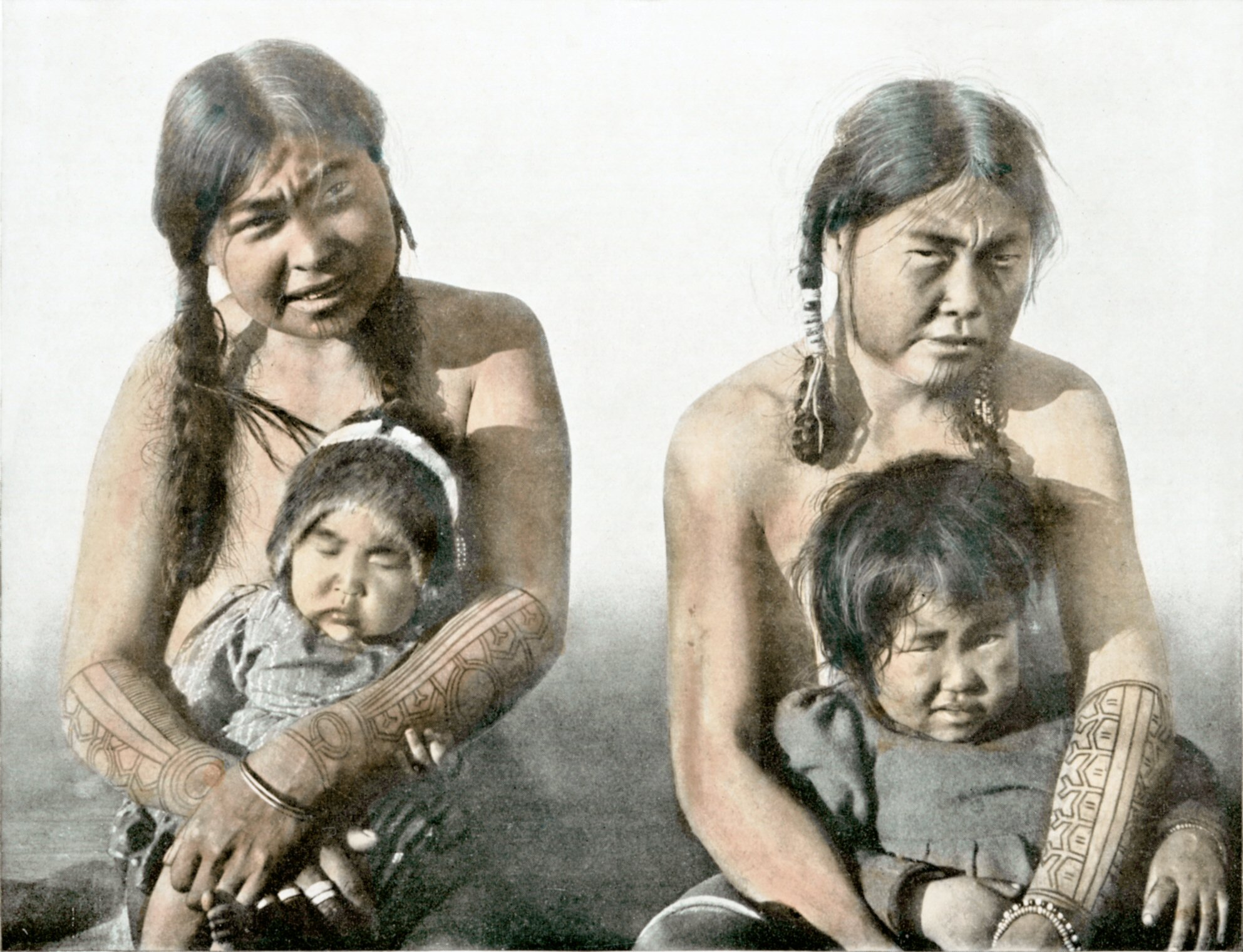
Inuit women and their children on King's Island, Canada, 1910. Tattoos on arms and chins.

The Inuit have a deep history of tattooing. In Inuktitut, the Inuit language of the eastern Canadian Arctic, the word kakiniit translates to the English word for tattoo and the word tunniit means face tattoo. Among the Inuit, some tattooed female faces and parts of the body symbolize a girl transitioning into a woman, coinciding with the start of her first menstrual cycle. A tattoo represented a woman's beauty, strength, and maturity. This was an important practice because some Inuit believed that a woman could not transition into the spirit world without tattoos on her skin. The Inuit have oral traditions that describe how the raven and the loon tattooed each other giving cultural significance to both the act of tattooing and the role of those animals in Inuit culture and history. European missionaries colonized the Inuit in the beginning of the 20th century and associated tattooing as an evil practice, "demonizing" anyone who valued tattoos. Alethea Arnaquq-Baril has helped Inuit women to revitalize the practice of traditional face tattoos through the creation of the documentary Tunniit: Retracing the Lines of Inuit Tattoos, where she interviews elders from different communities asking them to recall their own elders and the history of tattoos. The elders were able to recall the traditional practice of tattooing which often included using a needle and thread and sewing the tattoo into the skin by dipping the thread in soot or seal oil, or through skin poking using a sharp needle point and dipping it into soot or seal oil. Hovak Johnston has worked with the elders in her community to bring the tradition of kakiniit back by learning the traditional ways of tattooing and using her skills to tattoo others.

===== Osage Nation =====
The Osage people used tattooing for a variety of different reasons. The tattoo designs were based on the belief that people were part of the larger cycle of life and integrated elements of the land, sky, water, and the space in between to symbolize these beliefs. In addition, the Osage People believed in the smaller cycle of life, recognizing the importance of women giving life through childbirth and men removing life through warfare. Osage men were often tattooed after accomplishing major feats in battle, as a visual and physical reminder of their elevated status in their community. Some Osage women were tattooed in public as a form of a prayer, demonstrating strength and dedication to their nation.

===== Haudenosaunee Confederation =====
The people of the Haudenosaunee Confederation historically used tattooing in connection to war. A tradition for many young men was to go on a journey into the wilderness, fast from eating any food, and discover who their personal manitou was. Scholars explain that this process of discovery likely included dreams and visions that would bring a specific manitou to the forefront for each young man to have. The manitou became an important element of protection during warfare and many boys tattooed their manitou onto their body to symbolize cultural significance of the manitou to their lives. As they showed success in warfare, male warriors had more tattoos, some even keeping score of all the kills they had made. Some warriors had tattoos on their faces that tallied how many people they had scalped in their lifetime.

==== Central America ====
A Spanish expedition led by Gonzalo de Badajoz in 1515 across what is today Panama ran into a village where prisoners from other tribes had been marked with tattoos.

[The Spaniards] found, however, some slaves who were branded in a painful fashion. The natives cut lines in the faces of the slaves, using a sharp point either of gold or of a thorn; they then fill the wounds with a kind of powder dampened with black or red juice, which forms an indelible dye and never disappears. The Spaniards took these slaves with them. It seems that this juice is corrosive and produces such terrible pain that the slaves are unable to eat on account of their sufferings.

— Peter Martyr, Decade III, Book X

=== East Asia ===
==== China ====
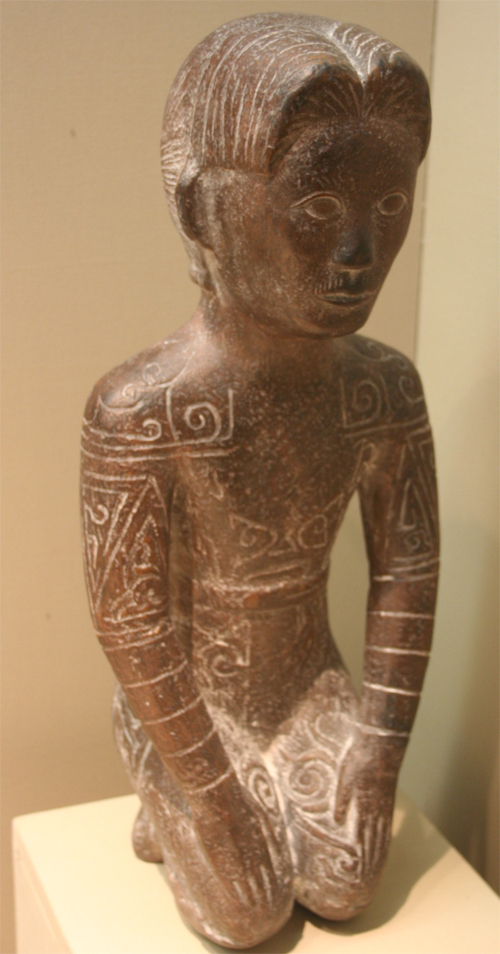
A Yue ("barbarian") statue of a tattooed man with short hair from the para-Austronesian cultures of southern China, from the Zhejiang Provincial Museum

In ancient China, tattoos were considered a barbaric practice associated with the Yue peoples of southeastern and southern China. Tattoos were often referred to in literature depicting bandits and folk heroes. As late as the Qing dynasty, it was common practice to tattoo characters such as 囚 ("Prisoner") on convicted criminals' faces. Although relatively rare during most periods of Chinese history, slaves were also sometimes marked to display ownership. However, tattoos seem to have remained a part of southern culture. Marco Polo wrote of Quanzhou, "Many come hither from Upper India to have their bodies painted with the needle in the way we have elsewhere described, there being many adepts at this craft in the city". At least three of the main characters – Lu Zhishen, Shi Jin (史進), and Yan Ching (燕青) – in the classic novel Water Margin are described as having tattoos covering nearly all of their bodies. Wu Song was sentenced to a facial tattoo describing his crime after killing Xi Menqing (西門慶) to avenge his brother. In addition, Chinese legend claimed the mother of Yue Fei (a famous Song general) tattooed the words "Repay the Country with Pure Loyalty" (精忠報國, jing zhong bao guo) down her son's back before he left to join the army. Cemeteries throughout the Tarim Basin (Xinjiang of western China) including the sites of Qäwrighul, Yanghai, Shengjindian, Zaghunluq, and Qizilchoqa have revealed several tattooed mummies with Western Asian/Indo-European physical traits and cultural materials. These date from between 2100 and 550 BCE.

==== Japan ====
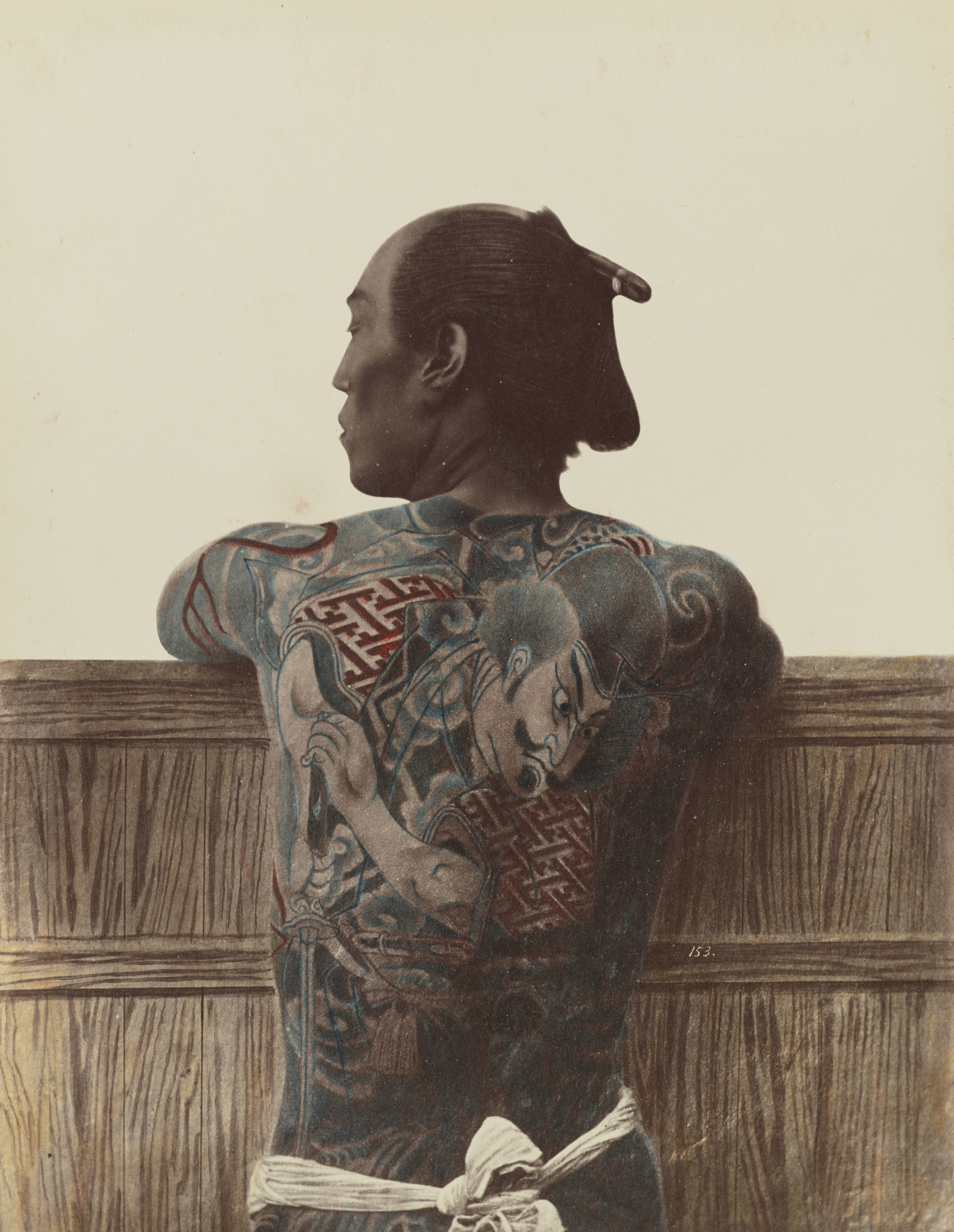
A tattooed man's back, c. 1875

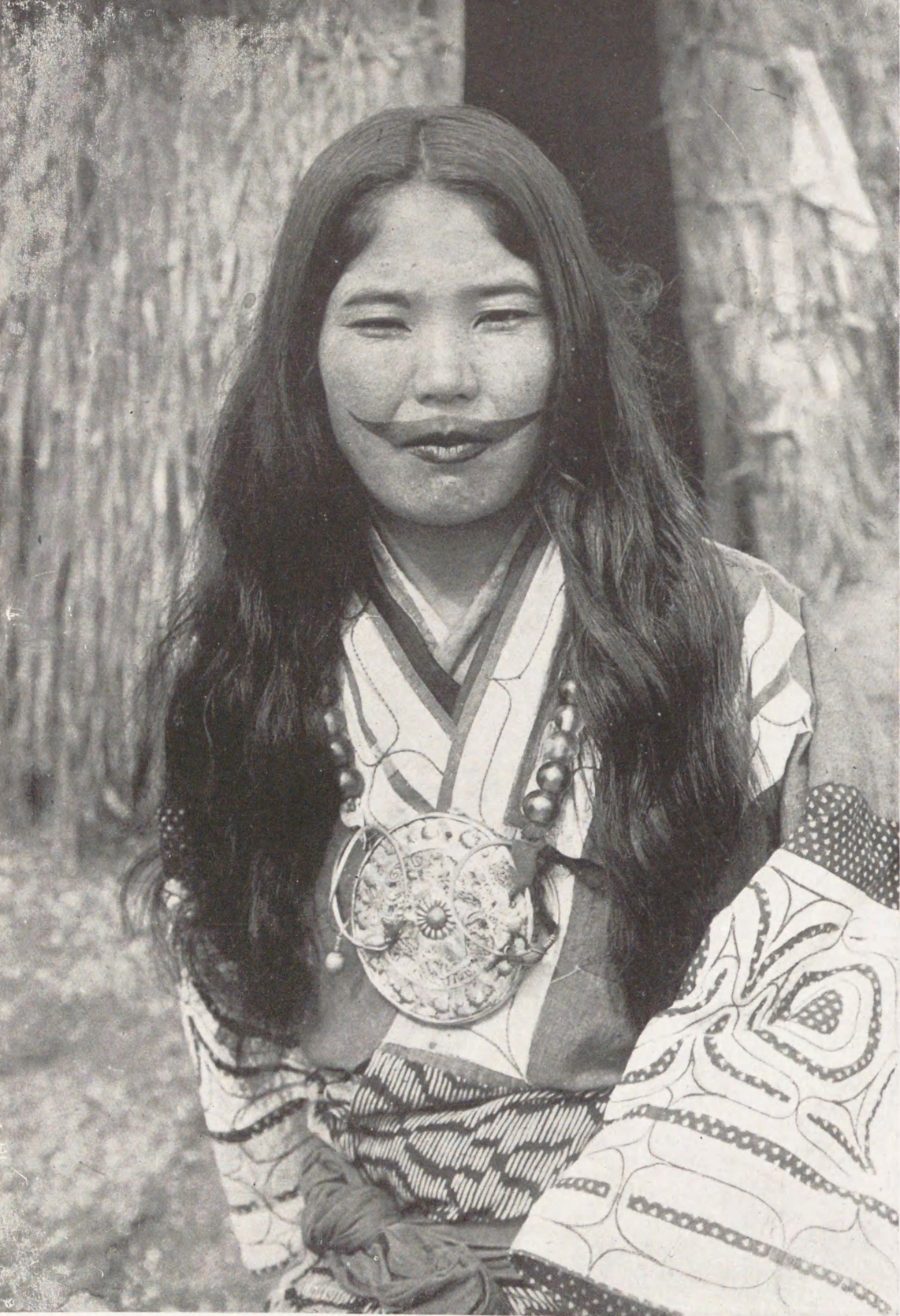
Ainu woman with mouth tattoo from a 1931 book

Tattooing for spiritual and decorative purposes in Japan is thought to extend back to at least the Jōmon or Paleolithic period and was widespread during various periods for both the Yamato and native Jomon groups. Chinese texts from before 300 CE described social differences among Japanese people as being indicated through tattooing and other bodily markings. Chinese texts from the time also described Japanese men of all ages as decorating their faces and bodies with tattoos. Between 1603 and 1868, Japanese tattooing was only practiced by the ukiyo (floating world) subculture. Generally firemen, manual workers and prostitutes wore tattoos to communicate their status. By the early 17th century, criminals were widely being tattooed as a visible mark of punishment. Criminals were marked with symbols typically including crosses, lines, double lines and circles on certain parts of the body, mostly the face and arms. These symbols sometimes designated the places where the crimes were committed. In one area, the character for "dog" was tattooed on the criminal's forehead. The Government of Meiji Japan, formed in 1868, banned the art of tattooing altogether, viewing it as barbaric and lacking respectability. This subsequently created a subculture of criminals and outcasts. These people had no place in "decent society" and were frowned upon. They could not simply integrate into mainstream society because of their obvious visible tattoos, forcing many of them into criminal activities which ultimately formed the roots for the modern Japanese mafia, the Yakuza, with which tattoos have become almost synonymous in Japan. The Ainu people also participate in tattooing called Sinuye. These are connected with the Kamuy, gods of the ainu culture. Women receive tattoos around their mouths at an early age, the tattooing continues until they are married. Men may receive tattoos as well, most commonly on the shoulders or arms.

=== Mainland Southeast Asia ===
==== Cambodia and Thailand ====
Thai-Khmer tattoos, also known as Yantra tattooing, was common since ancient times. Just as other native southeast Asian cultures, animistic tattooing was common in Tai tribes that were in southern China. Over time, this animistic practice of tattooing for luck and protection assimilated Hindu and Buddhist ideas. The Sak Yant traditional tattoo is practiced today by many and are usually given either by a Buddhist monk or a Brahmin priest. The tattoos usually depict Hindu gods and use the Mon script or ancient Khmer script, which were the scripts of the classical civilizations of mainland southeast Asia.

==== Myanmar ====
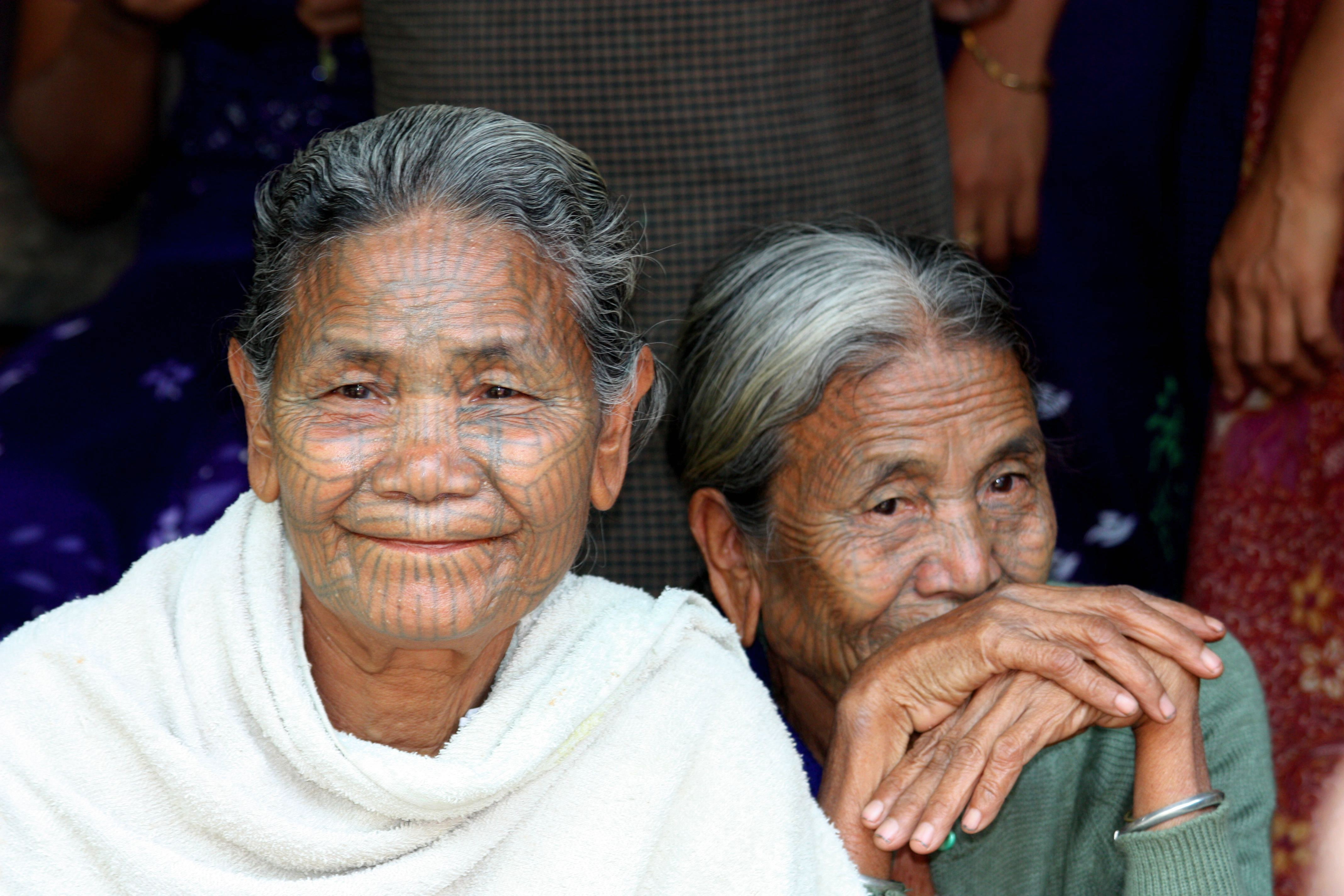
Chin women in Myanmar with facial tattoos

Tattooing in Burma was a widespread custom practiced by various ethnic groups, including the Bamar, Shan, Chin, and Karen, until the 20th century. Tattooing was a distinguishing cultural marker and a symbol of strength, courage and intimidation for Lethwei fighters.

=== Austronesia ===
==== Taiwan ====
In Taiwan, facial tattoos of the Atayal people are called ptasan; they are used to demonstrate that an adult man can protect his homeland, and that an adult woman is qualified to weave cloth and perform housekeeping. Taiwan is believed to be the homeland of all the Austronesian peoples, which includes Filipinos, Indonesians, Polynesians and Malagasy peoples, all with strong tattoo traditions. This along with the striking correlation between Austronesian languages and the use of the so-called hand-tapping method suggests that Austronesian peoples inherited their tattooing traditions from their ancestors established in Taiwan or along the southern coast of mainland China.

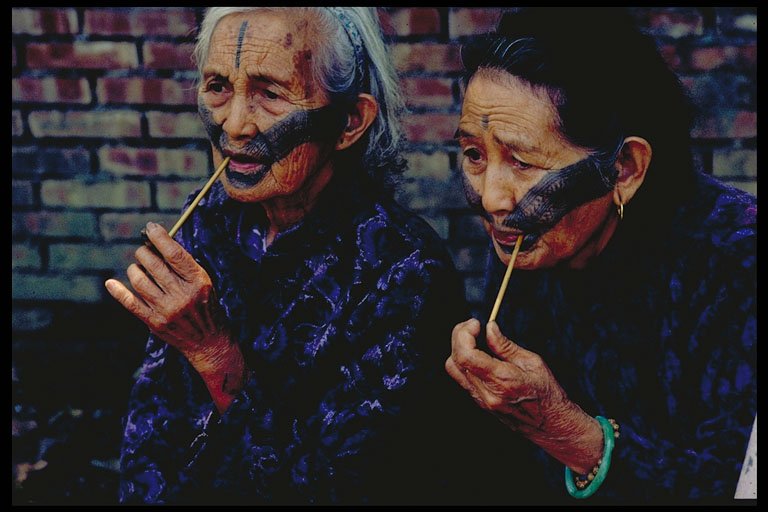
Two elder Atayal women with facial tattoos as a symbol of maturity, which was a tradition for both males and females. Tattooing customs of the Taiwanese indigenous peoples were banned during Japanese rule.

==== Philippines ====
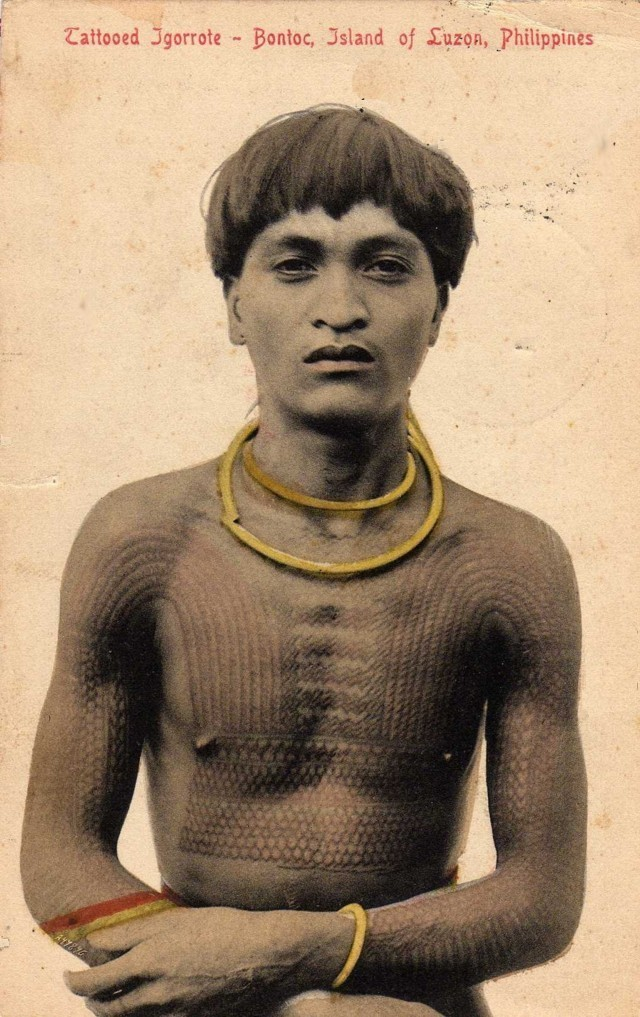
A 1908 photo of a Bontoc warrior bearing a head hunter's chaklag tattoo

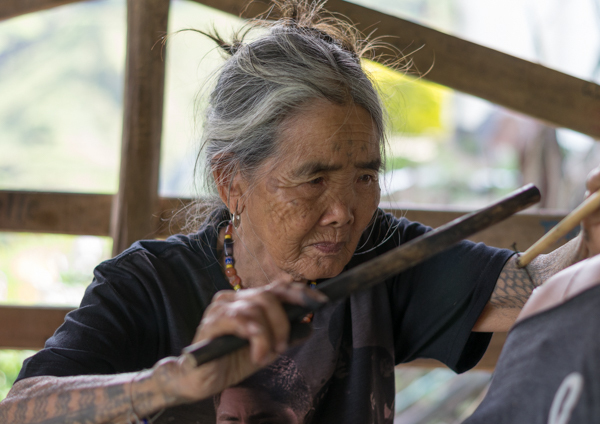
Whang-od, the last mambabatok of the Kalinga in the Philippines, performing a traditional batek tattoo with a mallet and hafted needles

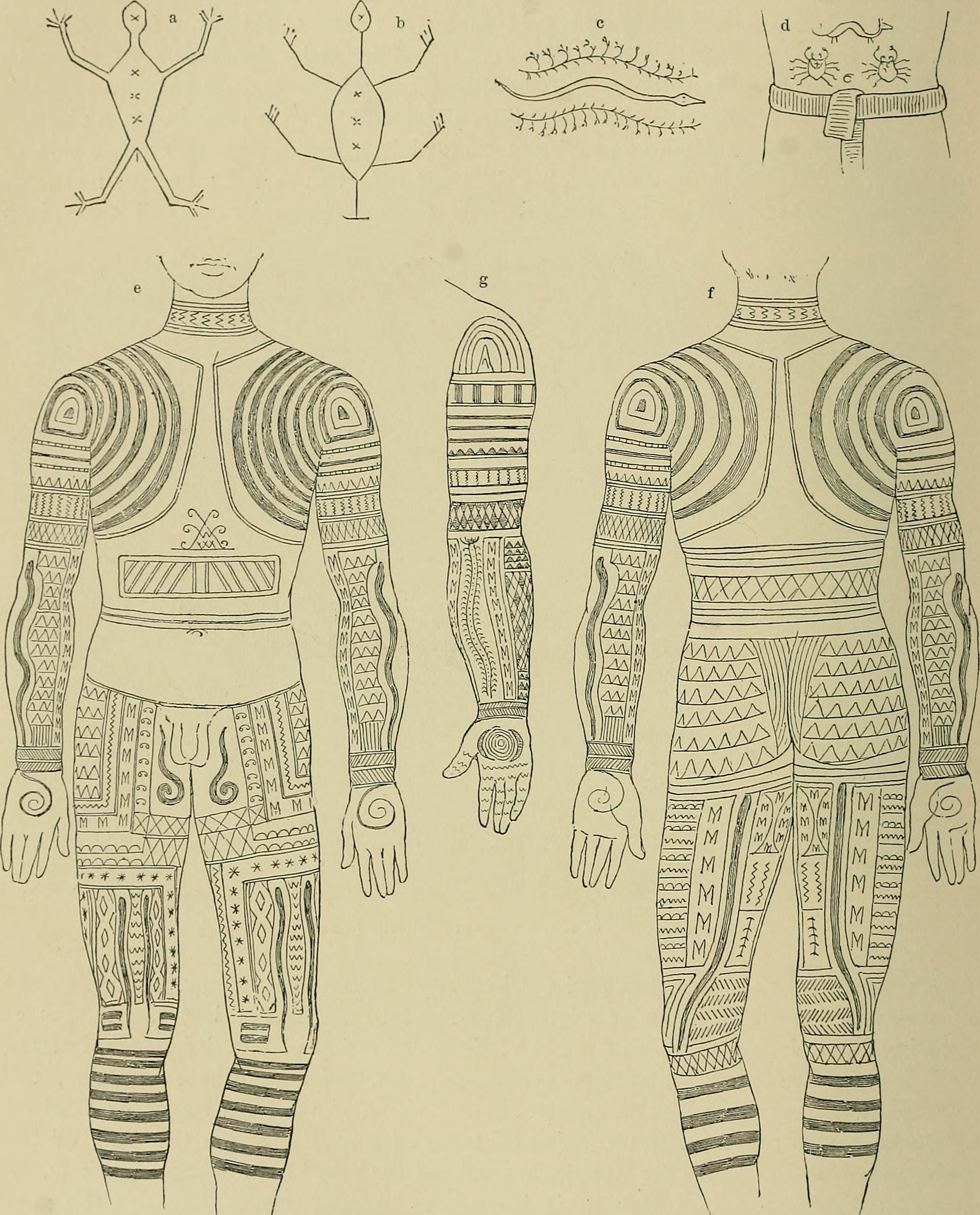
1896 illustration of Ibaloi tattoo patterns which are records of war exploits and status

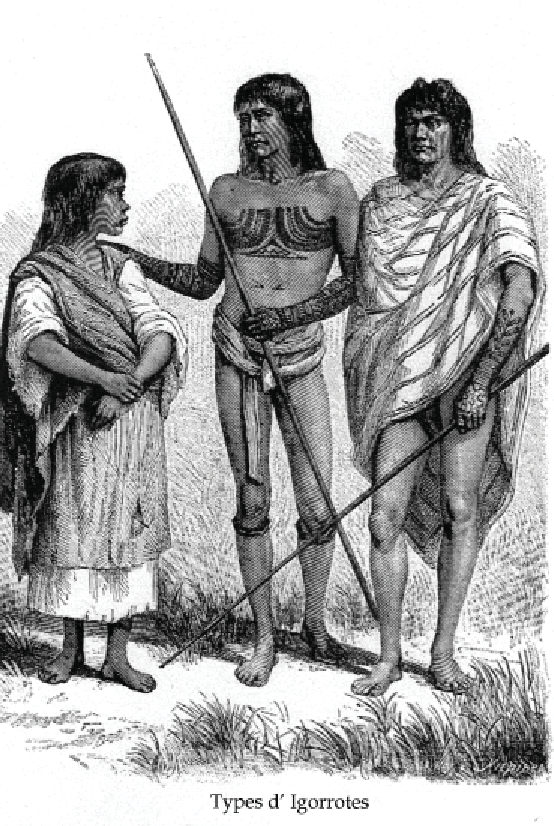
Illustration of Kankanaey tattoos covering the arms, chest, and face (c. 1887)

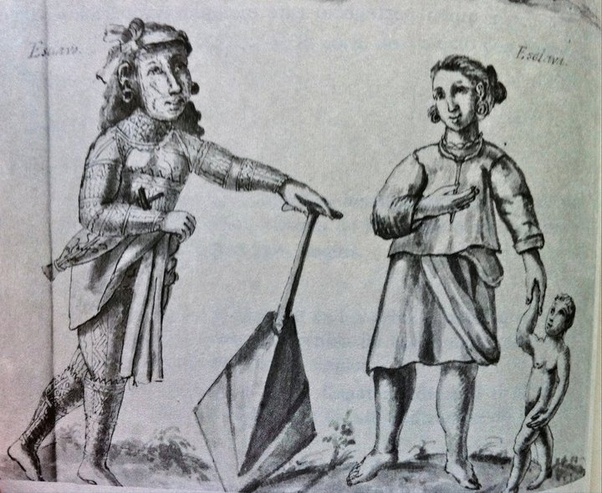
An illustration from Historia de las Islas e Indios de Bisayas (1668) by Francisco Ignacio Alcina depicting a tattooed Visayan uluhan (commoner warrior) with a paddle

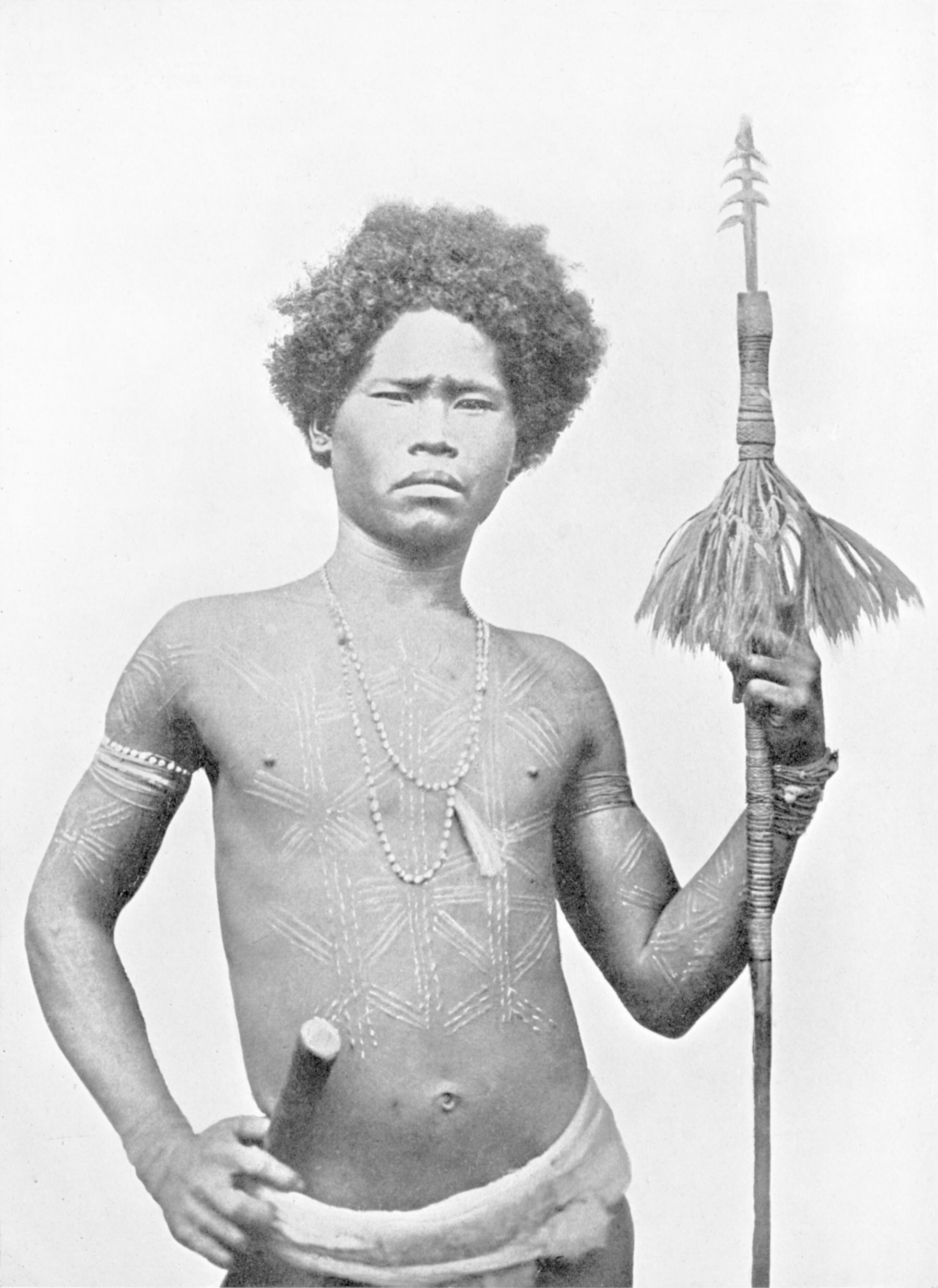
An Aeta man from Luzon with scarified tattoos (c. 1885)

Tattooing (batok) on both sexes was practiced by almost all ethnic groups of the Philippine Islands during the pre-colonial era, like in other Austronesian groups. Ancient clay human figurines found in archaeological sites in the Batanes Islands, around 2500 to 3000 years old, have simplified stamped-circle patterns, which are believed to represent tattoos and possibly branding (also commonly practiced) as well. Excavations at the Arku Cave burial site in Cagayan Province in northern Luzon have also yielded both chisel and serrated-type heads of possible hafted bone tattoo instruments alongside Austronesian material culture markers like adzes, spindle whorls, barkcloth beaters, and lingling-o jade ornaments. These were dated to before 1500 BCE and are remarkably similar to the comb-type tattoo chisels found throughout Polynesia.

Ancient tattoos can also be found among mummified remains of various Igorot peoples in cave and hanging coffin burials in northern Luzon, with the oldest surviving examples of which going back to the 13th century. The tattoos on the mummies are often highly individualized, covering the arms of female adults and the whole body of adult males. A 700 to 900-year-old Kankanaey mummy in particular, nicknamed "Apo Anno", had tattoos covering even the soles of the feet and the fingertips. The tattoo patterns are often also carved on the coffins containing the mummies. When Antonio Pigafetta of the Magellan expedition (c. 1521) first encountered the Visayans of the islands, he repeatedly described them as "painted all over". The original Spanish name for the Visayans, "Los Pintados" ("The Painted Ones") was a reference to their tattoos. Tattoos were known as batuk (or batok) or patik among the Visayan people; batik, buri, or tatak (compare with Samoan tatau) among the Tagalog people; buri among the Pangasinan, Kapampangan, and Bicolano people; batek, butak, or burik among the Ilocano people; batek, batok, batak, fatek, whatok (also spelled fatok), or buri among the various Igorot peoples; and pangotoeb (also spelled pa-ngo-túb, pengeteb, or pengetev) among the various Manobo peoples. These terms were also applied to identical designs used in woven textiles, pottery, and decorations for shields, tool and weapon handles, musical instruments, and others. Most of the names are derived from Proto-Austronesian *beCik ("tattoo") and *patik ("mottled pattern"). Affixed forms of these words were used to describe tattooed people, often as a synonym for "renowned/skilled person"; like Tagalog batikan, Visayan binatakan, and Ilocano burikan. Men without tattoos were distinguished as puraw among Visayans, meaning "unmarked" or "plain" (compare with Samoan pulaʻu). This was only socially acceptable for children and adolescents, as well as the asog (feminized men, usually shamans); otherwise being a puraw adult usually identified someone as having very low status. In contrast, tattoos in other ethnic groups (like the Manobo people) were optional, and no words that distinguished tattooed and non-tattooed individuals exist in their languages. Though when tattoos are present, they still have to follow various traditional rules when it comes to placement and design.

Tattoos were symbols of tribal identity and kinship, as well as bravery, beauty, and social or wealth status. They were also believed to have magical or apotropaic abilities, and can also document personal or communal history. Their design and placement varied by ethnic group, affiliation, status, and gender. They ranged from almost completely covering the body, including tattoos on the face meant to evoke frightening masks among the elite warriors of the Visayans; to being restricted only to certain areas of the body like Manobo tattoos which were only done on the forearms, lower abdomen, back, breasts, and ankles. They were commonly repeating geometric designs (lines, zigzags, repeating shapes); stylized representations of animals (like snakes, lizards, dogs, frogs, or giant centipedes), plants (like grass, ferns, or flowers), or humans; or star-like and sun-like patterns. Each motif had a name, and usually a story or significance behind it, though most of them have been lost to time. They were the same patterns and motifs used in other artforms and decorations of the particular ethnic groups they belong to. Tattoos were, in fact, regarded as a type of clothing in itself, and men would commonly wear only loincloths (bahag) to show them off.

"The principal clothing of the Cebuanos and all the Visayans is the tattooing of which we have already spoken, with which a naked man appears to be dressed in a kind of handsome armor engraved with very fine work, a dress so esteemed by them they take it for their proudest attire, covering their bodies neither more nor less than a Christ crucified, so that although for solemn occasions they have the marlotas (robes) we mentioned, their dress at home and in their barrio is their tattoos and a bahag, as they call that cloth they wrap around their waist, which is the sort the ancient actors and gladiators used in Rome for decency's sake."

— Pedro Chirino, Relación de las Islas Filipinas (1604),

Tattoos are acquired gradually over the years, and patterns can take months to complete and heal. The tattooing process were sacred events that involved rituals to ancestral spirits (anito) and the heeding of omens. For example, if the artist or the recipient sneezes before a tattooing, it was seen as a sign of disapproval by the spirits, and the session was called off or rescheduled. Artists were usually paid with livestock, heirloom beads, or precious metals. They were also housed and fed by the family of the recipient during the process. A celebration was usually held after a completed tattoo. Tattoos were made by skilled artists using the distinctively Austronesian hafted tattooing technique. This involves using a small hammer to tap the tattooing needle (either a single needle or a brush-like bundle of needles) set perpendicular to a wooden handle in an L-shape (hence "hafted"). This handle makes the needle more stable and easier to position. The tapping moves the needle in and out of the skin rapidly (around 90 to 120 taps a minute). The needles were usually made from wood, horn, bone, ivory, metal, bamboo, or citrus thorns. The needles created wounds on the skin that were then rubbed with the ink made from soot or ashes mixed with water, oil, plant extracts (like sugarcane juice), or even pig bile. The artists also commonly traced an outline of the designs on the skin with the ink, using pieces of string or blades of grass, prior to tattooing. In some cases, the ink was applied before the tattoo points are driven into the skin. Most tattoo practitioners were men, though female practitioners also existed. They were either residents to a single village or traveling artists who visited different villages. Another tattooing technique predominantly practiced by the Lumad and Negrito peoples uses a small knife or a hafted tattooing chisel to quickly incise the skin in small dashes. The wounds are then rubbed with pigment. They differ from the techniques which use points in that the process also produces scarification. Regardless, the motifs and placements are very similar to the tattoos made with hafted needles. Tattooing traditions were lost as Filipinos were converted to Christianity during the Spanish colonial era. Tattooing were also lost in some groups (like the Tagalog and the Moro people) shortly before the colonial period due to their (then recent) conversion to Islam. It survived until around the 19th to the mid-20th centuries in more remote areas of the Philippines, but also fell out of practice due to modernization and western influence. Today, it is a highly endangered tradition and only survives among some members of the Igorot people of the Luzon highlands, some Lumad people of the Mindanao highlands, and the Sulodnon people of the Panay highlands.

==== Malaysia and Indonesia ====
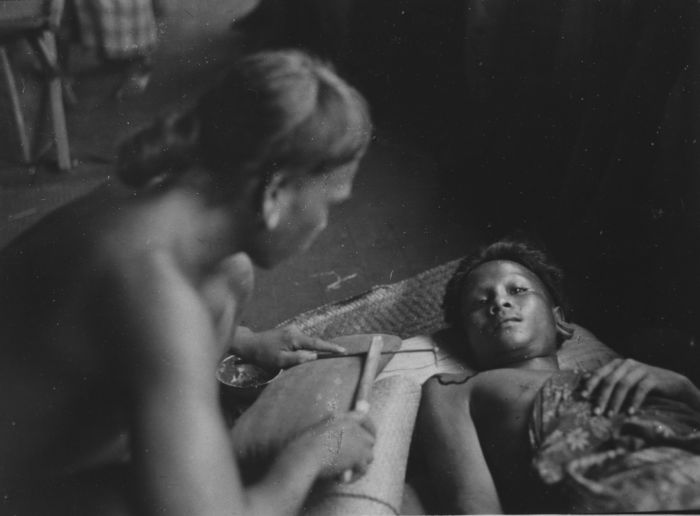
Dayak tattooing in progress with a mallet and hafted needles

Several tribes in the insular parts have tattooing in their culture. One notable example is the Dayak people of Kalimantan in Borneo (Bornean traditional tattooing). Another ethnic group that practices tattooing are the Mentawai people, as well as Moi and Meyakh people in West Papua.

==== Solomon Islands ====
Some artifacts dating back 3,000 years from the Solomon Islands may have been used for tattooing human skin. Obsidian pieces have been duplicated, then used to conduct tattoos on pig skin, then compared to the original artifacts. "They conducted these experiments to observe the wear, such as chipping and scratches, and residues on the stones caused by tattooing, and then compared that use-wear with 3,000 year old artifacts. They found that the obsidian pieces, old and new, show similar patterns, suggesting that they hadn't been used for working hides, but were for adorning human skin."

==== Polynesia ====
===== Rapa Nui =====
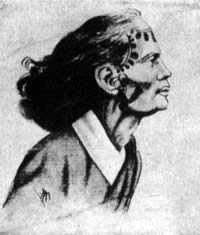
Ana Eva Hei of Rapa Nui, (Walter Knoche, 1911)

===== Marquesas Islands =====
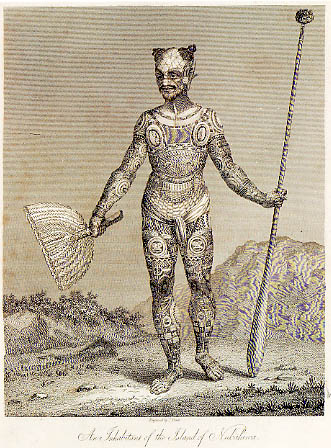
Tattoos on a Nuku Hiva warrior (1813)

===== New Zealand =====
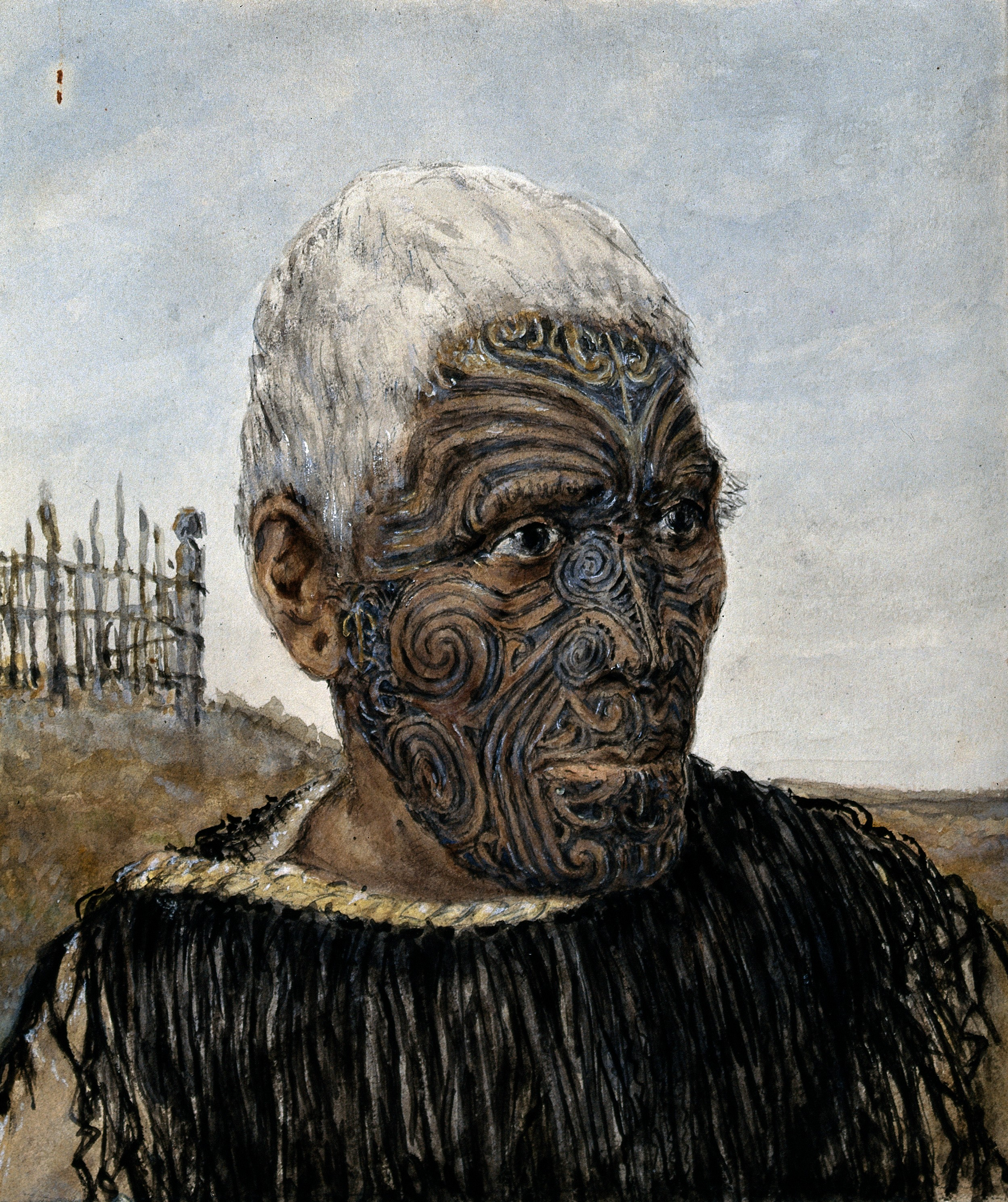
Te Arawa warrior by Horatio Gordon Robley (1864)

The Māori people of New Zealand practised a form of tattooing known as tā moko, traditionally created with chisels. However, from the late 20th century onward, there has been a resurgence of tā moko taking on European styles amongst Maori. Traditional tā moko was reserved for head area. There is also a related tattoo art, kirituhi, which has a similar aesthetic to tā moko but is worn by non-Maori.

===== Samoa =====
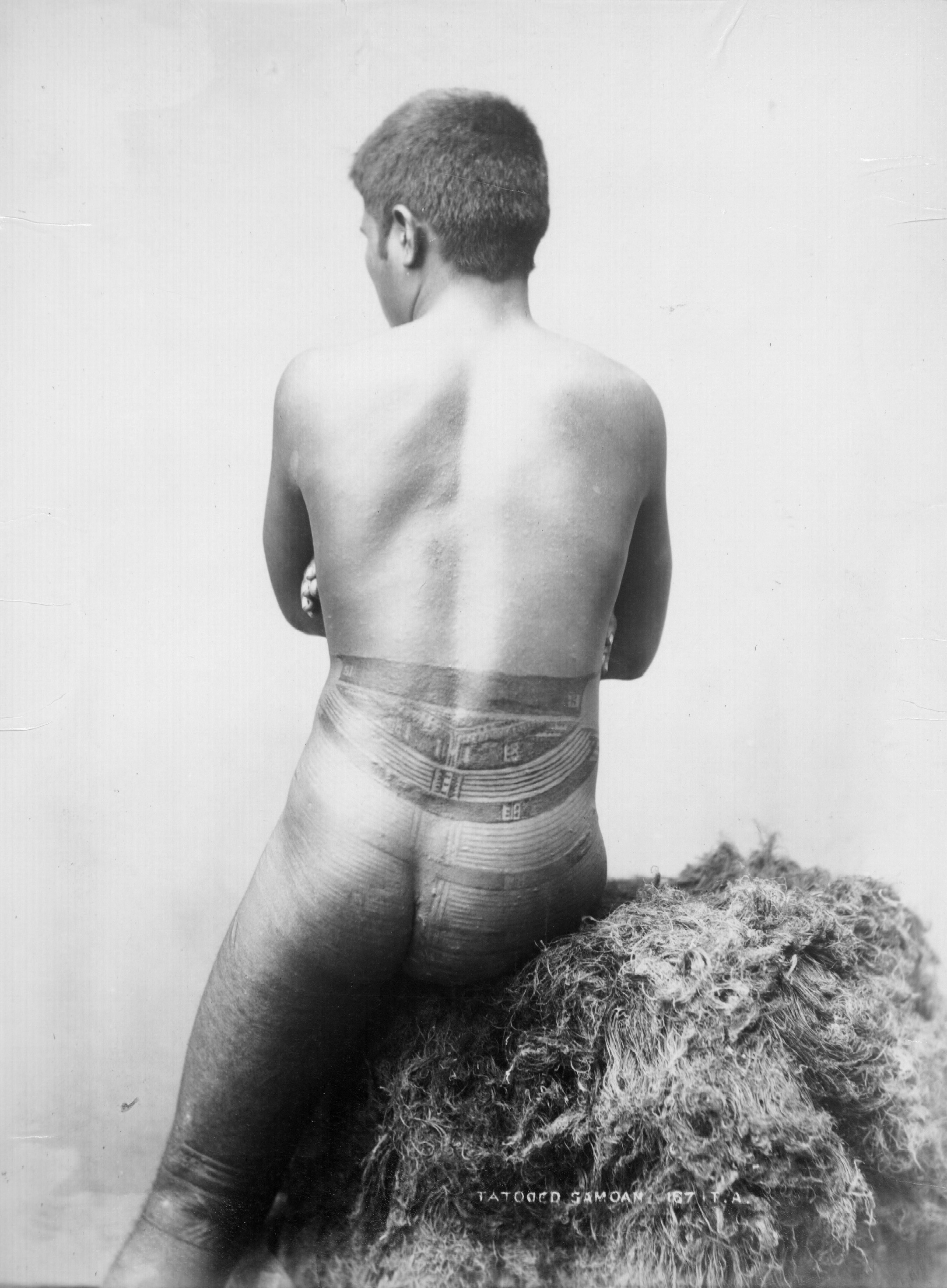
Back view of a Samoan man with tattoos (c. 1890)

The traditional male tattoo in the Samoan Islands is called the pe'a. The traditional female tattoo is called the malu. The word tattoo is believed to have originated from the Samoan word tatau, coming from Proto-Oceanic *sau₃ referring to a wingbone from a flying fox used as an instrument for the tattooing process. In Samoa, the tradition of applying tattoo, or tatau, by hand has been unbroken for over two thousand years. Tools and techniques have changed little. The skill is often passed from father to son, each tattoo artist, or tufuga, learning the craft over many years of serving as his father's apprentice. A young artist-in-training often spent hours, and sometimes days, tapping designs into sand or tree bark using a special tattooing comb, or au. Honoring their tradition, Samoan tattoo artists made this tool from sharpened boar's teeth fastened together with a portion of the turtle shell and to a wooden handle. The Samoan tattooing process used a number of tools which remained almost unchanged since their first use. "Autapulu" is a wide tattooing comb used to fill in the large dark areas of the tattoo. "Ausogi'aso tele" is a comb used for making thick lines. "Ausogi'aso laititi" is a comb used for making thin lines. "Aumogo" small comb is used for making small marks. "Sausau" is the mallet used for striking the combs. It is almost two feet in length and made from the central rib of a coconut palm leaf. "Tuluma" is the pot used for holding the tattooing combs. Ipulama is the cup used for holding the dye. The dye is made from the soot collected from burnt lama nuts. "Tu'I" used to grind up the dye. These tools were primarily made out of animal bones to ensure sharpness.

Traditional Samoan tattooing of the pe'a, a body tattoo, is an ordeal that is not lightly undergone. It takes many weeks to complete. The process is very painful and used to be a necessary prerequisite to receiving a matai title; this however is no longer the case. Tattooing was also a very costly procedure.. Samoan society has long been defined by rank and title, with chiefs (ali'i) and their assistants, known as talking chiefs (tulafale). The tattooing ceremonies for young chiefs, typically conducted at the time of puberty, were part of their ascendance to a leadership role. The pain was extreme and the risk of death by infection was a concern. The permanent marks left by the tattoo artists would celebrate their dedication to cultural traditions. To back down from tattooing was to risk being labeled a "pala'ai" or coward. Those who could not endure the pain and abandoned their tattooing were left incomplete, would be forced to wear their mark of shame throughout their life. This would forever bring shame upon their family so it was avoided at all cost. The tattooing process itself would be 5 sessions, in theory. These 5 sessions would be spread out over 10 days for the inflammation to subside. Christian missionaries from the west attempted to purge tattooing among the Samoans, thinking it barbaric and inhumane. Many young Samoans resisted mission schools since they forbade them to wear tattoos. But over time attitudes relaxed toward this cultural tradition and tattooing began to reemerge in Samoan culture.

=== South Asia ===
==== India ====
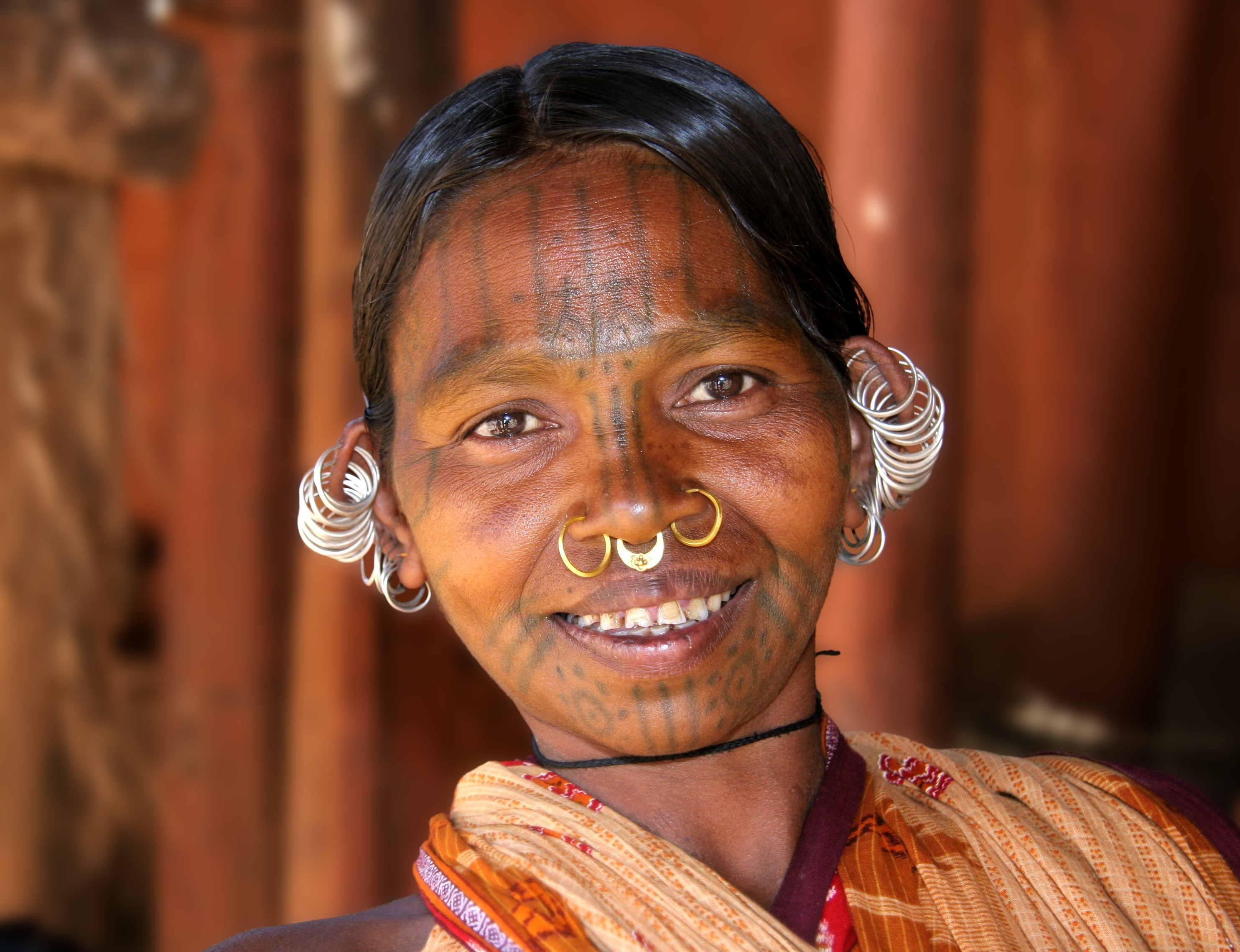
Khond woman with facial tattoo in Odisha, India

Godna, also known as Khoda, is an ancient traditional form of tattoo art originating from the tribal communities of Northern and Central India, and present in their diasporas.

=== Nepal ===
A collection of tattooing experiences from the Tharu people from Nepal. Bhuti Devi from Hasanpur village in Sunsari district shares her experiences of getting tattooed.

Bhuti Devi from Hasanpur village in Sunsari district shares her experiences of getting a tattoo.

Chanabati Tharu from Dumariya village in Sunsari district shares her experiences of getting tattooed.

Garbi Dasin from Dumariya village in Sunsari district shares her experiences of tattooing.

=== West Asia ===
==== Persia ====
Herodotus' writings suggest that slaves and prisoners of war were tattooed in Persia during the classical era. This practice spread from Persia to Greece and then to Rome.

The most well-known depiction of tattooing in Persian literature goes back 800 years to a tale by Rumi about a man from Qazwin who seeks a lion tattoo from the barber but changes his mind once he experiences the pain of the needle.

In the hamam (the baths), there were dallaks whose job was to help people wash themselves. This was a notable occupation because apart from helping the customers with washing, they were massage-therapists, dentists, barbers and tattoo artists.

==== Kurds ====
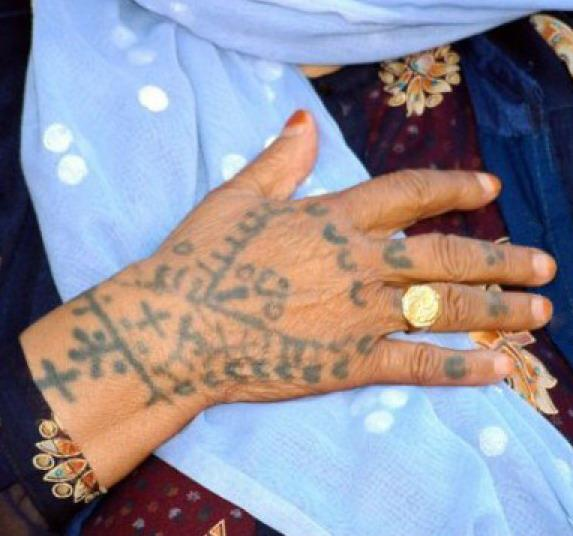
Traditional Kurdish tattoo or deq on female hand

Facial tattoos are popular among the Kurdish people in Iraq, Turkey, Syria and Iran, mostly in the form of dotted tattoos on the chin. They are most common among women aged 60 and above. Younger women often have more minimalist tattoos, such as a dot on the cheek or chin. These tattoos are often done at home with a sewing needle and soot filled into the puncture. Many of the tattoos depict symbols from nature, such as plants, animals and stars. Tattoos between the eye are meant to protect from the evil eye.

==== Ottoman Empire ====
Tattoos became widespread in the Ottoman Empire, likely through influence from Arabs as they gained popularity by the 18th century in Istanbul. Janissaries in different guilds and extortion groups would tattoo their group emblem. The emblems also proved useful to extortionist gangs, and "the local trendiness of bodily ornamentation is recognized by the observation that "presently, it (al-washm) is a must among all Janissaries."

==== Bedouin Arabs ====
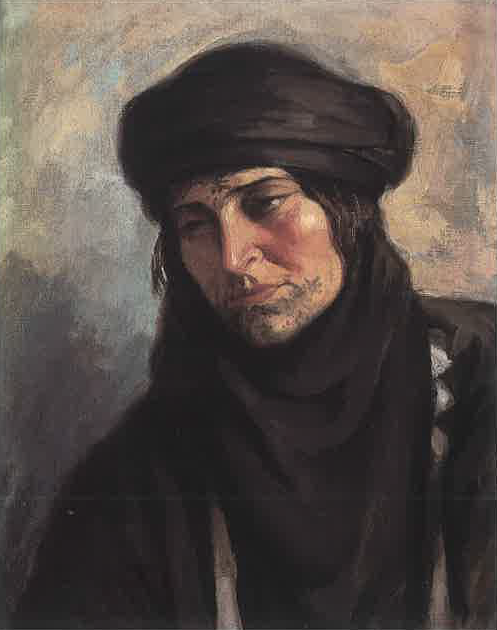
Bedouin women traditionally wore facial tattoos, known as daq

16th century Ottoman scholars described the tattoo as very common among the Arabs. Facial and hand tattoos among Bedouins have long been documented and continue until the present, especially among women. The tattoos are usually done at home by other women (Romani women were traditionally hired for this work), and symbolize personal milestones and community history and identification. The tattoos are often made by indentation and insertion of indigo dye on the face, ankles, wrists and other body parts. They are also considered to ward off the evil eye and malevolent forces, and to protect the person, with some attributing healing and medical properties; similar beliefs existed in Ancient Egypt. Designs may include stars, animals, or geometric designs. Tattooing has decreased in popularity since the 1950s.

=== North Africa ===
==== Egypt and Nubia ====
According to the ARCE (American Research Center in Egypt), tattooed human remains and iconographic evidence indicate that ancient Egyptians practiced tattooing from at least 2000 BCE. It is theorized that tattooing entered Egypt through Nubia, but this claim is complicated by the high mobility between Lower Nubia and Upper Egypt as well as Egypt's annexation of Lower Nubia during the Middle Kingdom. Archeologist Geoffrey J. Tassie argues that it may be more appropriate to classify tattoo in ancient Egypt and Nubia as part of a larger Nile Valley tradition.

The most famous tattooed mummies from this region are Amunet, a priestess of Hathor, and two Hathoric dancers from Dynasty XI that were found at Deir el-Bahari. In 1898, Daniel Fouquet, a medical doctor from Cairo, wrote an article on medical tattooing practices in ancient Egypt in which he describes the tattoos on these three mummies and speculates that they may have served a medicinal or therapeutic purpose: "The examination of these scars, some white, others blue, leaves in no doubt that they are not, in essence, ornament, but an established treatment for a condition of the pelvis, very probably chronic pelvic peritonitis."

Ancient Egyptian tattooing appears to have been practiced on women exclusively; with an exception of a pre-dynastic male mummy found with

"Dark smudges on his arm, appearing as faint markings under natural light, had remained unexamined. Infrared photography recently revealed that these smudges were in fact tattoos of two slightly overlapping horned animals. The horned animals have been tentatively identified as a wild bull (long tail, elaborate horns) and a Barbary sheep (curving horns, humped shoulder). Both animals are well known in Predynastic Egyptian art. The designs are not superficial and have been applied to the dermis layer of the skin, the pigment was carbon-based, possibly some kind of soot."

constituting the oldest known figural tattoo. And the possible exception of one extremely worn Dynasty XII stele, there is no artistic or physical evidence that men were commonly tattooed. However, by the Meroitic Period (300 BCE – 400 CE), it was practiced on Nubian men as well. Accounts of early travelers to ancient Egypt describe the tool used as an uneven number of metal needles attached to a wooden handle. Two well-preserved Egyptian mummies dated from 3351 to 3017 BCE, a man and woman, bear figural tattoo patterns of horned animals.

==== Berbers ====
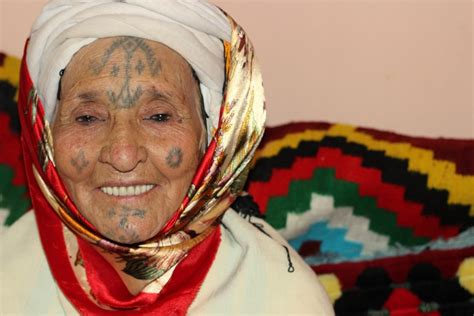
Berber woman with facial tattoo

Berber communities in Maghreb (Algeria, Morocco, Tunisia and Libya) practice tattooing on the arms, hands, face, neck, and collarbones. It is thought the tradition in these communities goes back several thousand years. Tattoos serve multiple purposes, including decoration, tribal affiliation, symbols of life transitions, and medicinal and fertility purposes. The practice is mainly limited to women, although some men receive tattoos for healing or medicinal purposes; these tattoos tend to be smaller and more discreet. Traditionally, girls would receive their first facial tattoo at puberty. Symbols used include the yaz, representing freedom, nature symbols like suns, animals, and plants, and geometric symbols like lines, dots, triangles, circles, half circles, and diamonds. The tradition has declined due to the influence of Islam, in which tattooing is forbidden, and specifically a wave of stricter Salafism in North Africa in the late 1970s and early 1980s. Berber tattoo artists both in North Africa and in the diaspora are continuing the practice.

==== Copts ====
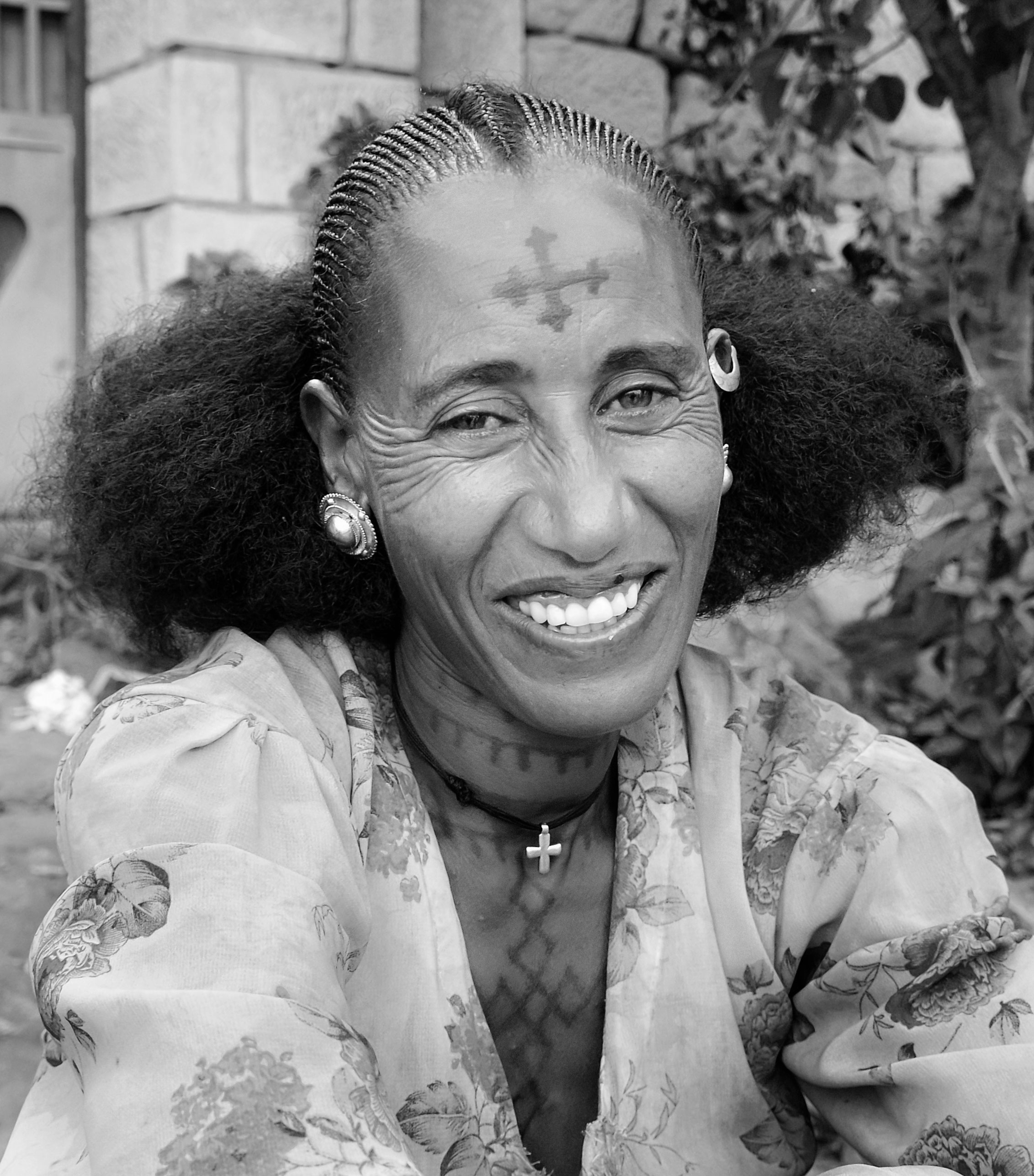
Tigray woman from Ethiopia with a Coptic cross tattoo

Coptic tattoos often consist of three lines, three dots and two elements, reflecting the Trinity. The tools used had an odd number of needles to bring luck and good fortune. Many Copts have the Coptic cross tattooed on the inside of their right arm. This may have been influenced by a similar practice tattooing religious symbols on the wrists and arms during the Ptolemaic period.

=== East Africa ===
==== Ethiopia ====
Traditional Ethiopian tattoos called Niksat were used as symbols of beauty such as the tattooing of the gums, tattooed crosses and dots that were used for protection from Spirits and Identity such as patterns on the neck. The method used to create tattoos is a poking technique that uses a small sharp instrument like a needle or a small thorn that is dipped in a soot and oil mix which is made to create the ink and is then poked into the skin. The tattoos were usually taken place at celebrations, ceremonies, and rituals and are done by women. Women often got tattooed on the forehead, neck, hands, and gums while men would have tattooed gums as well which was called Guramayle.

=== West Africa: Importance of Scarification ===
Scarification is different from the tattooing with ink because scarification is the cutting or burning of the skin to make a permanent rising or indented mark on the skin. This method of tattooing is used to show social status, royalty, beautification and fertility. There are different types of scarifications, for example, Facial scarification, which were scars and marks created on the face was often used for beautification and identity which were used for the Yoruba of Nigeria, Tiv, and Hausa. Another form of this technique is Cicatrization which are risen Keloid scares which are usually created from deep cuts to remove patches of skin. It is important for these to be highly visible. In order to do this, ash, clay, or charcoal is rubbed on the skin to slow the healing process allowing the scar tissue to grow.

=== Europe ===
The earliest possible evidence for tattooing in Europe appears on ancient art from the Upper Paleolithic period as incised designs on the bodies of humanoid figurines. The Löwenmensch figurine from the Aurignacian culture dates to approximately 40,000 years ago and features a series of parallel lines on its left shoulder. The ivory Venus of Hohle Fels, which dates to between 35,000 and 40,000 years ago also exhibits incised lines down both arms, as well as across the torso and chest.

The oldest and most famous direct proof of ancient European tattooing appears on the body of Ötzi the Iceman, who was found in the Ötz valley in the Alps and dates from the late 4th millennium BCE. Studies have revealed that Ötzi had 61 carbon-ink tattoos consisting of 19 groups of parallel or intersecting lines on his lower spine, left wrist, behind his right knee and on his ankles. It has been argued that these tattoos may have had a therapeutic function because of their simplicity and placement, however careful review of the evidence suggests that these markings may have served other functions as well.

The Picts may have been tattooed (or scarified) with elaborate, war-inspired black or dark blue woad (or possibly copper for the blue tone) designs. Julius Caesar described these tattoos in Book V of his Gallic Wars (54 BCE). Nevertheless, these may have been painted markings rather than tattoos. In his encounter with a group of pagan Scandinavian Rus' merchants in the early 10th century, Ahmad ibn Fadlan describes what he witnesses among them, including their appearance. He notes that the Rus' were heavily tattooed: "From the tips of his toes to his neck, each man is tattooed in dark green with designs, and so forth." Raised in the aftermath of the Norman conquest of England, William of Malmesbury describes in his Gesta Regum Anglorum that the Anglo-Saxons were tattooed upon the arrival of the Normans (..."arms covered with golden bracelets, tattooed with coloured patterns ...").

==== Balkans ====
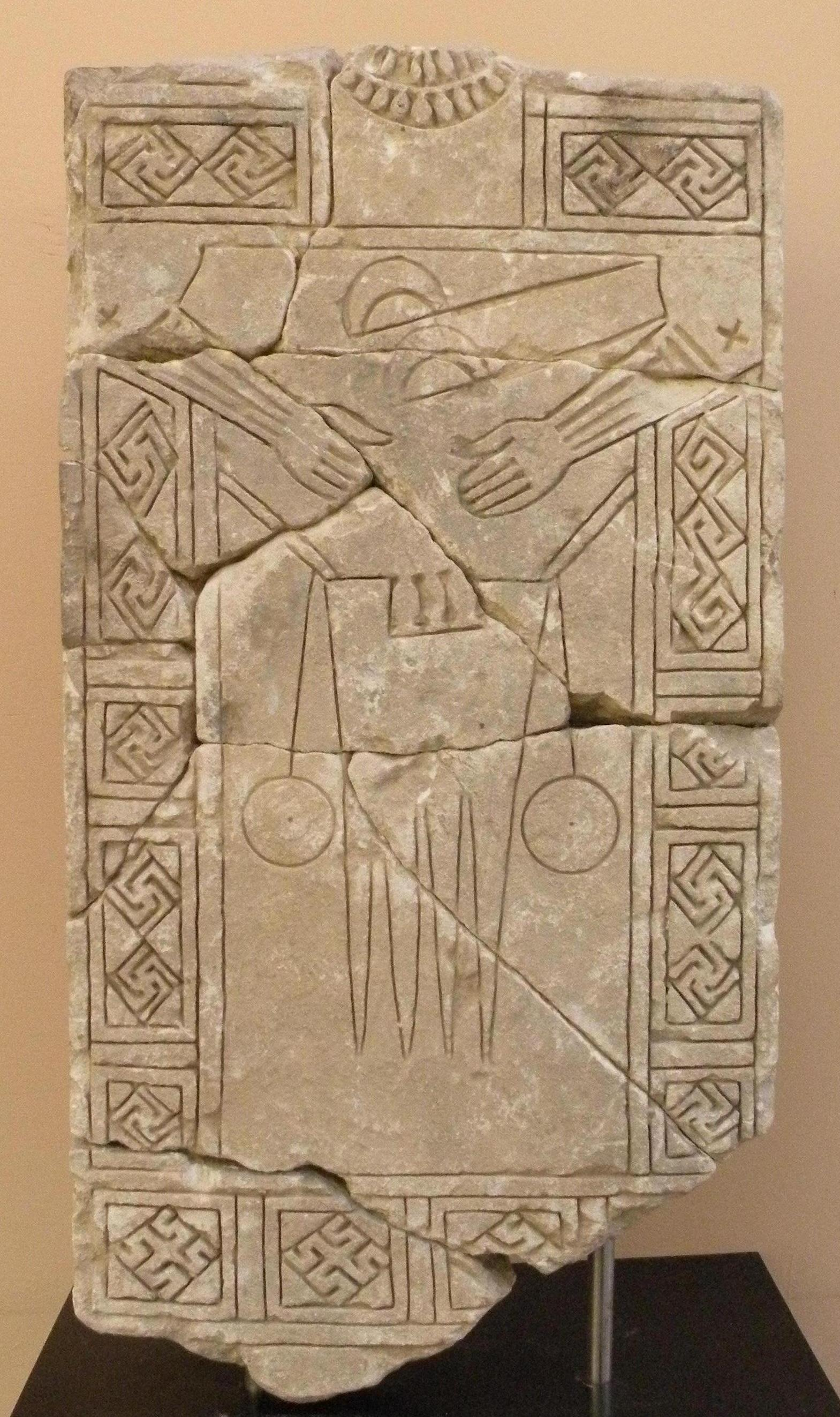
Early figurative representation of the Palaeo-Balkan custom of tattooing on 610-550 BC Daunian funerary stele from Apulia.

Based on the writings of ancient authors such as Herodotus (5th century BC), Cicero and Strabo (1st century BC), whose statements are also confirmed by archaeological findings, ethnographic studies have concluded that the practice of tattooing among the peoples of the Balkan peninsula was known since ancient times. This practice was found among the Illyrian and Thracian tribes, who used tattooing to distinguish tribal origins. Before the Iron Age, this Paleo-Balkan practice also spread from the western Balkans to southeast Italy (Apulia) by Iapygian migrations across the Adriatic Sea. In the Graeco-Roman world tattooing was conceived as a barbaric custom that was used exclusively for punitive or ownership purposes, but the ancient Balkan peoples' perception of tattooing was different, as it was a deep and long-standing cultural embodiment distinguishing them from other cultures. The writings of ancient authors show that in the Balkans tattooing was in the purview of the elites. Iconographic and literary sources reveal in particular that it was especially practiced by the female members of society. In the western Balkans, isolated from outside influences, the practice of tattooing continued until the early 20th century in Albania (Albanian traditional tattooing) and Bosnia (Sicanje), regions that in antiquity were part of the area of Illyria.

==== Illyrians ====
Long bronze needles with wooden handles found in Glasinac and Donja Dolina are considered to have been tools for practicing tattoos. Early figurative representations of this ancient Balkan tradition are found in Apulia, southeast Italy, in the material culture of the Daunians, who were of western Balkan provenance. The custom of tattooing among Daunians can be detected in Daunian stelae and in matt-painted ollae. It can also be conceivably identified on the wall of a late 4th-century tomb chamber from Arpi, in which a painting shows tattoos on the arms of the 'priestess' riding a quadriga. Daunian material culture shows that among them, forearms were the most common tattooed parts of the body.

==== Thracians ====
The Thracians, who inhabited East Macedonia and southeast Bulgaria, viewed tattoos as signs of nobility and divinity. In Book 5 (of The Histories), Herodotus remarks that the Thracians believed "the possession of tattoos held to be a sign of breeding, while the lack of them was a mark of low birth". Thracians primarily used tattoos for decorative purposes. Tattoos helped display one's heritage and courage through intricate designs that carried personal and familial significance. Some historians suggest that tattoos served as a form of intimidation too, becoming an integral part of a warrior's armor and identity.

Tattooing among the Thracian tribes was mostly voluntary, reflecting its non-punitive purpose. While it is impossible to confirm that this was true for all Thracian tribes – due to a lack of irrefutable evidence and because the Thracians were a group of non-literary people – it can still be reasonably concluded that tattoos were often used for decorative reasons, or at least had the potential to be. That tattoos were used as a way of expressing ideas, and cultural values, reflecting the standards of beauty and aesthetic ideals of the time.

Thracian women drew their tattoos in different areas. They were mainly placed on their arms, legs, and chests, and consisted of geometric patterns, such as spirals, or symbolic animal figures, like deer and half-moons. These tattoos also enhanced their physical appearances, "accentuating their lithe and agile bodies". Thracian tattoos were therefore used as mediums of pride and artistry, reflecting a cultural emphasis on beauty rather than punishment.

==== Greece ====
Greek written records, particularly from Herodotus, suggest that the Greeks learned tattooing from the Persians during the sixth century BCE. Herodotus claims that tattoos were first used to relay important messages, serving as a means of communication during times of war and conflict. Over time, the function of tattoos diversified, reflecting the changes in cultural values across different societies and periods of time. Historians initially believed that these historical accounts were referring to the practice of branding, but recent research shows that the two were distinct from one another both linguistically and procedurally. The Greeks used the verb stizein, meaning 'to prick' or 'to sting', and its cognate noun, stigma, to describe the result. During the Byzantine period, the verb kentein (κεντεῖν) replaced stizein, and a variety of new Latin terms replaced stigmata including signa "signs", characteres "stamps", and cicatrices "scars". Today, the connotation of 'stigma' takes on a similar role, relating to a permanent mark of disgrace and shame. By comparison, C.P.Jones points out that branding was described with different terminologies, typically associated with the meaning of 'a burn' or 'a stamp'.

The Ancient Greeks held a complex and generally negative view of tattoos. This disdain was stronger and more intently targeted at Thracian women. According to various legends, Orpheus died at the hands of these women, also referred to as Maenads. Artistic depictions from the Hellenistic period, including paintings and vases, show Maenads decapitating Orpheus. One version suggests that the Thracian women tore him apart in a fit of madness and passionate love. Another version states that Orpheus had taught and revealed homosexual love to the Thracian men, prompting the wives, out of fury, to murder him. Despite the conflicting accounts, most sources connect Orpheus' death to the actions of these women. This association likely amplified the Greeks' animosity towards Thracian women. Although it is unclear whether Thracian men shared the same sentiments, Plutarch suggests that Thracian men tattooed their wives and women as a reminder of their crimes too. However, some historians interpret these tattoos as a sign and way of mourning Orpheus' death, rather than as a form of punishment.

The Greeks were not entirely unaware of the aesthetic aspect of tattoos. In Anabasis, Xenophon describes the group he encountered near the coast of the Black Sea as having embroidery-like flower patterns on their bodies. The adjective he uses, poikilos, carries aesthetic connotations. However, despite this recognition, the Greeks predominantly associated tattoos with barbarians and sought to link the practice to foreign culture. For instance, many comedies featured fictional slaves being threatened with tattoos. In Wasps, the enslaved Xanthias wishes he had a tortoise shell as he yells out "I am being tattooed to death with a stick". As suggested by C.P. Jones, it is probably not that Xanthias was getting physically beat up but that his master was using the sharp point of the stick to ink him. Similarly, in Birds, there are promises and desires to turn tattooed runaway slaves into beautiful spotted creatures. In The Laws, Plato also briefly mentions how "if anyone is caught committing sacrilege, if be a slave or a stranger, let his offence be written on his face and his hands". These examples illustrate how the Greeks used tattooing to punish criminals as well as to reinforce cultural boundaries, to separate themselves and assert superiority. In the Graeco-Roman world, tattoos were frequently drawn on the forehead. A place that is highly visible, permanently altering one's identity and appearance. As Geoffrey Bakewell suggests, "This deliberate placement simultaneously marked the individuals as property of the state and also converted them into currencies for market transitions". Tattoos thus emphasized the tattooer's power, control, and social standing within society and reinforced the 'tattoo recipients' marginalized position by stripping them of their autonomy and freedom.

==== Rome ====
The ancient Greeks and Romans used tattooing to penalize slaves, criminals, and prisoners of war. While known, decorative tattooing was looked down upon and religious tattooing was mainly practiced in Egypt and Syria. The lack of adequate hygiene endangered one's health and the permanent nature of tattoos served as a continuous reminder of subservience. This practice facilitated the ostracization of these individuals from 'respectable' members of society, creating a visible divide between 'us' and 'them'. Compared to the Greeks, the Romans adopted a more systematic approach to punitive tattooing. They incorporated words, phrases, and acronyms that were typically a combination of the nature of the crime that he/she had committed, the name of the victim (or of the master), and the sentence itself. According to Aeschines, some slaves bore the inscription: "Stop me, I'm a runaway". In this way, tattoos became a tool for systematic exploitation and social control, and to exclude criminals and slaves from receiving citizenship, even if they had earned their freedom. Tattoos ensured that "they were confined to the lowest possible category of free non-citizens". In 316, emperor Constantine I made it illegal to tattoo the face of slaves as punishment. The Romans of Late Antiquity also tattooed soldiers and arms manufacturers, a practice that continued into the ninth century.

==== Scythia ====
A tattoo on the right arm of a Scythian chieftain whose mummy was discovered at Pazyryk, Russia. The tattoo was made between about 200 and 400 BCE.

Tattooed mummies dating to c. 500 BCE were extracted from burial mounds on the Ukok plateau during the 1990s. Their tattooing involved animal designs carried out in a curvilinear style. The Man of Pazyryk, a Scythian chieftain, is tattooed with a detailed range of fish, monsters and a series of dots that lined up along the spinal column (lumbar region) and around the right ankle.

== 16th century ==
In 1566, French sailors abducted an Inuk woman and her child in modern-day Labrador and brought her to the city of Antwerp in modern-day Belgium. The mother was tattooed while the child was unmarked. In Antwerp, the two were put on display at a local tavern at least until 1567, with handbills promoting the event being distributed in the city. In 1577, English privateer Martin Frobisher captured two Inuit and brought them back to England for display. One of the Inuit was a tattooed woman from Baffin Island, who was illustrated by the English cartographer John White.

== 17th and 18th century ==
=== Pilgrimage ===
British and other pilgrims to the Holy Lands throughout the 17th century were tattooed with the Jerusalem cross to commemorate their voyages, including William Lithgow in 1612.

=== "Painted Prince" ===
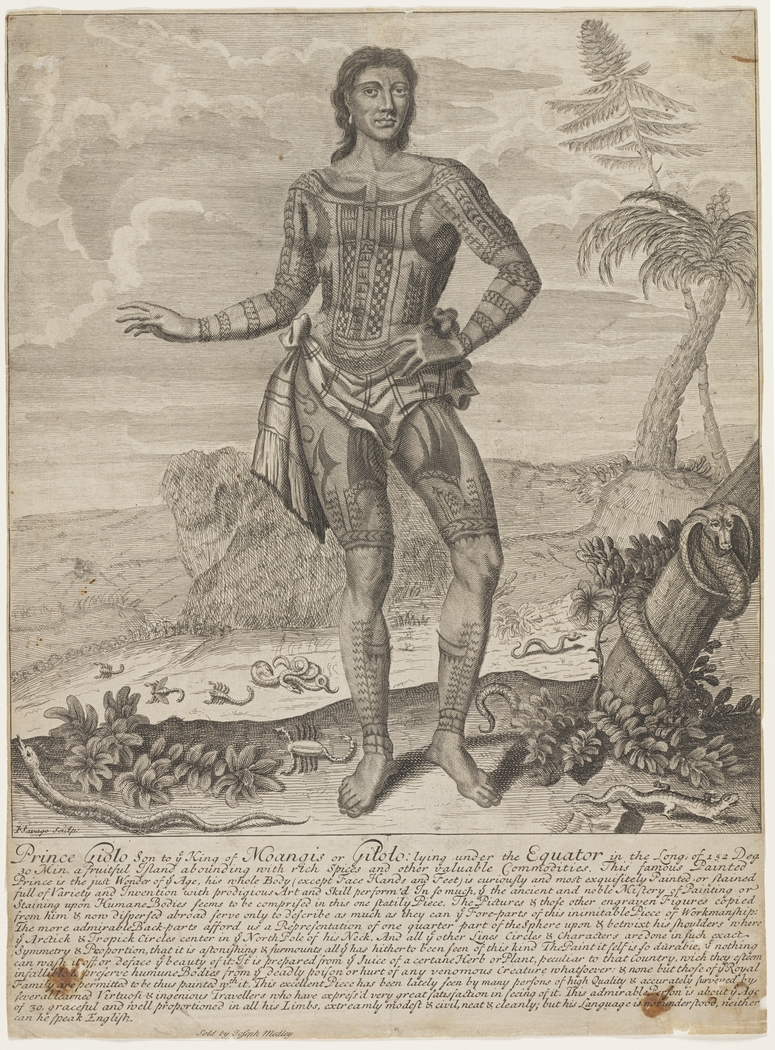
Giolo (real name Jeoly) of Miangas, who became enslaved in Mindanao and bought by the English William Dampier together with Jeoly's mother, who died at sea. Jeoly was exhibited in London in a human zoo in 1691 to large crowds, until he died of smallpox three months later. Throughout the time he was exhibited, Dampier gained a fortune.

Perhaps the most famous tattooed foreigner in Europe prior to the voyages of James Cook was the "Painted Prince" – a slave named "Jeoly" from Mindanao in the Philippines. He was initially bought with his mother (who died of illness shortly afterwards) from a Mindanaoan slave trader in Mindanao in 1690 by a "Mister Moody", who passed Jeoly on to the English explorer William Dampier. Dampier described Jeoly's intricate tattoos in his journals:

He was painted all down the Breast, between his Shoulders behind; on his Thighs (mostly) before; and the Form of several broad Rings, or Bracelets around his Arms and Legs. I cannot liken the Drawings to any Figure of Animals, or the like; but they were very curious, full of great variety of Lines, Flourishes, Chequered-Work, &c. keeping a very graceful Proportion, and appearing very artificial, even to Wonder, especially that upon and between his Shoulder-blades [...] I understood that the Painting was done in the same manner, as the Jerusalem Cross is made in Mens Arms, by pricking the Skin, and rubbing in a Pigment.

— William Dampier, A New Voyage Around the World (1697)

Jeoly told Dampier that he was the son of a rajah in Mindanao, and told him that gold (bullawan) was very easy to find in his island. Jeoly also mentioned that the men and women of Mindanao were also tattooed similarly, and that his tattoos were done by one of his five wives. Some authors believe him to be a Visayan pintado. Visayan people are a Philippine ethnolinguistic group native to the Visayas, the southernmost islands of Luzon and a significant portion of Mindanao that speak Binisaya language. Other authors claimed Jeoly is Palauan due to the pattern of his tattoos and his account that he was tattooed by women (Palauan tattooists were female). However, the pattern of his tattoos are very similar to all Batok in recorded history and it is a known fact that tattooing can be done by women tattoo artists like Apo Whang-od, the last surviving mambabatok. Dampier brought Jeoly with him to London, intending to recoup the money he lost while at sea by displaying Jeoly to curious crowds. Dampier invented a fictional backstory for him, renaming him "Prince Giolo" and claiming that he was the son and heir of the "King of Gilolo." Instead of being from Mindanao, Dampier now claimed that he was only shipwrecked in Mindanao with his mother and sister, whereupon he was captured and sold into slavery. Dampier also claimed that Jeoly's tattoos were created from an "herbal paint" that rendered him invulnerable to snake venom, and that the tattooing process was done naked in a room of venomous snakes. Dampier initially toured around with Jeoly, showing his tattoos to large crowds. Eventually, Dampier sold Jeoly to the Blue Boar Inn in Fleet Street. Jeoly was displayed as a sideshow by the inn, with his likeness printed on playbills and flyers advertising his "exquisitely painted" body. By this time, Jeoly had contracted smallpox and was very ill. He was later brought to the University of Oxford for examination, but he died shortly afterwards of smallpox at around thirty years of age in the summer of 1692. His tattooed skin was preserved and was displayed in the Anatomy School of Oxford for a time, although it was lost prior to the 20th century.

=== Cook's expedition ===
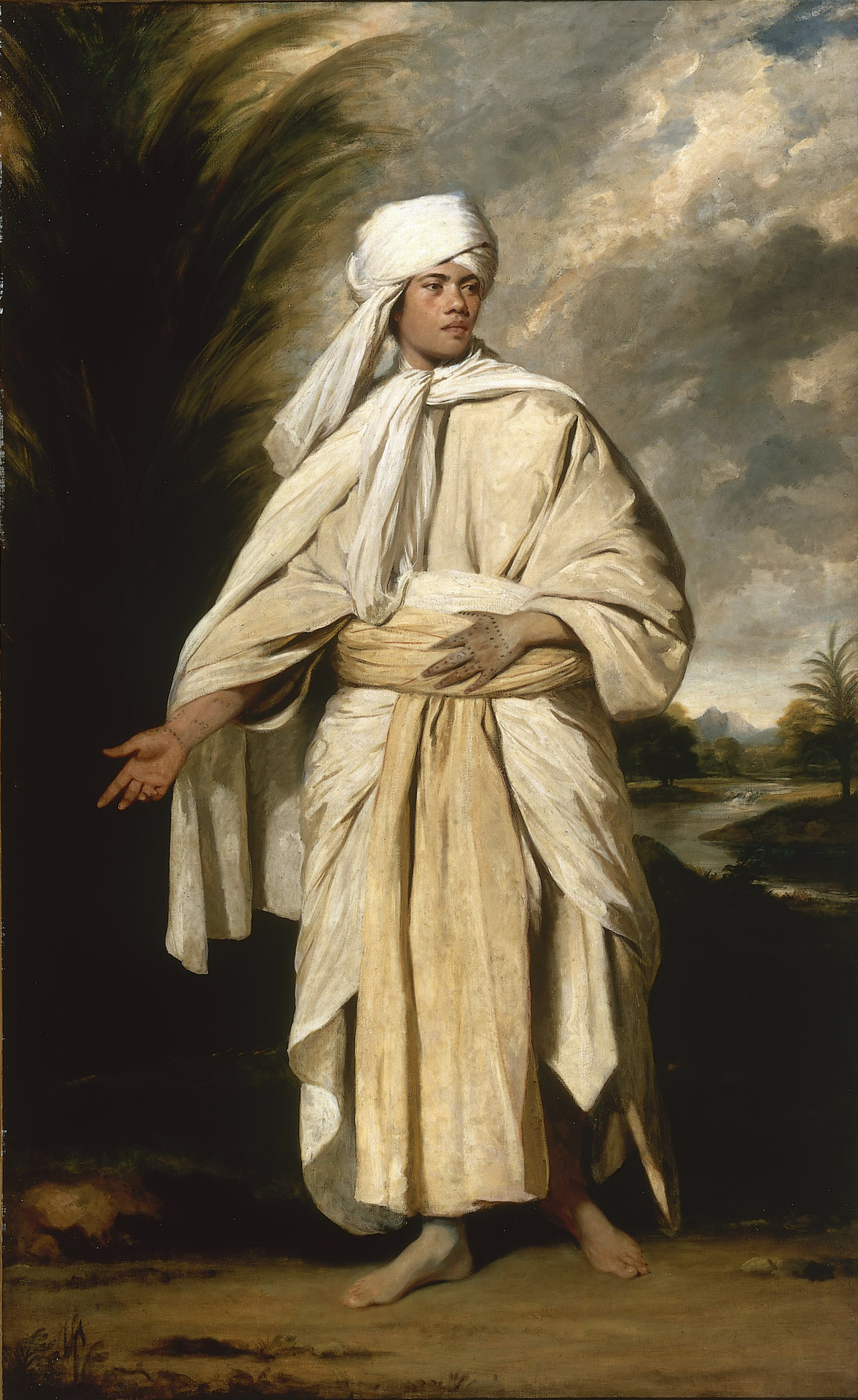
A portrait of Omai, a tattooed Raiatean man brought back to Europe by Captain James Cook

Between 1766 and 1779, Captain James Cook made three voyages to the South Pacific, the last trip ending with Cook's death in Hawaii in February 1779. When Cook and his men returned home to Europe from their voyages to Polynesia, they told tales of the 'tattooed savages' they had seen. The word "tattoo" itself comes from the Tahitian tatau, and was introduced into the English language by Cook's expedition (though the word 'tattoo' or 'tap-too', referring to a drumbeat, had existed in English since at least 1644) It was in Tahiti aboard the Endeavour, in July 1769, that Cook first noted his observations about the indigenous body modification and is the first recorded use of the word tattoo to refer to the permanent marking of the skin. In the ship's log book recorded this entry: "Both sexes paint their Bodys, Tattow, as it is called in their Language. This is done by inlaying the Colour of Black under their skins, in such a manner as to be indelible." Cook went on to write, "This method of Tattowing I shall now describe...As this is a painful operation, especially the Tattowing of their Buttocks, it is performed but once in their Lifetimes." Cook's Science Officer and Expedition Botanist, Sir Joseph Banks, returned to England with a tattoo. Banks was a highly regarded member of the English aristocracy and had acquired his position with Cook by putting up what was at the time the princely sum of some ten thousand pounds in the expedition. In turn, Cook brought back with him a tattooed Raiatean man, Omai, whom he presented to King George and the English Court. Many of Cook's men, ordinary seamen and sailors, came back with tattoos, a tradition that would soon become associated with men of the sea in the public's mind and the press of the day. In the process, sailors and seamen re-introduced the practice of tattooing in Europe, and it spread rapidly to seaports around the globe.

==== "Reintroduction" to the Western world ====
The popularity of modern Western tattooing owes its origins in large part to Captain James Cook's voyages to the South Pacific in the 1770s, but since the 1950s a false belief has persisted that modern Western tattooing originated exclusively from these voyages. Tattooing has been consistently present in Western society from the modern period stretching back to Ancient Greece, though largely for different reasons. A long history of European tattoo predated these voyages, including among sailors and tradesmen, pilgrims visiting the Holy Land, and on Europeans living among Native Americans. European sailors have practiced tattooing since at least the 16th century (see sailor tattoos). Tattoo historian Anna Felicity Friedman suggests a couple reasons for the "Cook Myth". First, modern European words for the practice (e.g., "tattoo", "tatuaje", "tatouage", "Tätowierung", and "tatuagem") derive from the Tahitian word "tatau", which was introduced to European languages through Cook's travels. However, prior European texts show that a variety of metaphorical terms were used for the practice, including "pricked", "marked", "engraved", "decorated", "punctured", "stained", and "embroidered". Friedman also points out that the growing print culture at the time of Cook's voyages may have increased the visibility of tattooing despite its prior existence in the West.

=== Early United States ===
In the period shortly after the American Revolution, to avoid impressment by British Navy ships, sailors used government issued protection papers to establish their American citizenship. However, many of the descriptions of the individual described in the seamen's protection certificates were so general, and it was so easy to abuse the system, that many impressment officers of the Royal Navy simply paid no attention to them. One way of making them more specific and more effective was to describe a tattoo, which is highly personal as to subject and location, and thus use that description to precisely identify the seaman. As a result, many of the official certificates also carried information about tattoos and scars, including sketches of tattoos, as well as any other specific identifying information. This also perhaps led to an increase and proliferation of tattoos among American seamen who wanted to avoid impressment. During this period, tattoos were not popular with the general public.

== 19th and 20th century ==
Tattooing has steadily increased in popularity since the invention of the electric tattoo machine. Evidence indicates that electric tattoo machines were in use by the late 1880s, at least several years prior to the first tattoo machine patent obtained by Samuel F. O'Reilly on 8 December 1891.

=== Europe ===
By the 19th century, tattooing had spread to British society but was still largely associated with sailors and the lower or even criminal class. Tattooing had however been practised in an amateur way by public schoolboys from at least the 1840s and by the 1870s had become fashionable among some members of the upper classes, including royalty. In its upmarket form, it could be a lengthy, expensive and sometimes painful process. By the 1860s and 70s, the custom had spread to Hungary, and was popular mainly among Hungarian miners, while it has spread earlier among the upper classes, notably István Széchenyi had one, among others.

The first documented professional tattooist (with a permanent studio, working on members of the paying public) in Britain was Sutherland Macdonald in the early 1880s. Tattooing was an expensive and painful process and by the late 1880s had become a mark of wealth for the crowned heads of Europe. Tattooing spread among the upper classes all over Europe in the 19th century, but particularly in Britain where it was estimated in Harmsworth Magazine in 1898 that as many as one in five members of the gentry were tattooed. Taking their lead from the British Court, where George V followed Edward VII's lead in getting tattooed; King Frederik IX of Denmark, the King of Romania, Kaiser Wilhelm II, King Alexander of Yugoslavia and even Tsar Nicholas II of Russia, all sported tattoos, many of them elaborate and ornate renditions of the Royal Coat of Arms or the Royal Family Crest. King Alfonso XIII of modern Spain also had a tattoo.

The perception that there is a marked class division on the acceptability of the practice has been a popular media theme in Britain, as successive generations of journalists described the practice as newly fashionable and no longer for a marginalised class. Examples of this cliché can be found in every decade since the 1870s. Despite this evidence, a myth persists that the upper and lower classes find tattooing attractive and the broader middle classes rejecting it. In 1969, the House of Lords debated a bill to ban the tattooing of minors, on grounds it had become "trendy" with the young in recent years but was associated with crime. It was noted that 40 per cent of young criminals had tattoos and that marking the skin in this way tended to encourage self-identification with criminal groups. Two peers, Lord Teynham and the Marquess of Aberdeen and Temair however rose to object that they had been tattooed as youngsters, with no ill effects. Since the 1970s, tattoos have become more socially acceptable and fashionable among celebrities.

=== Russian gang culture ===
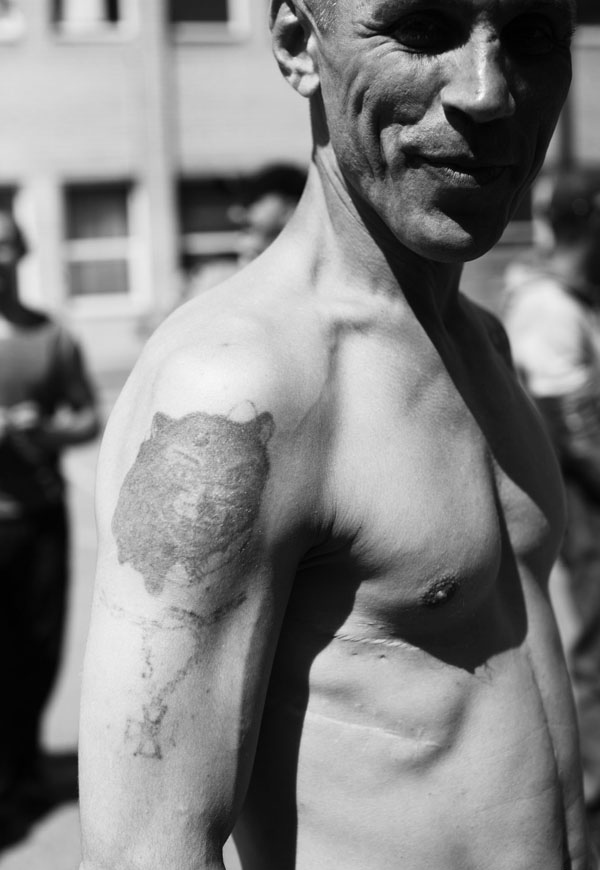
Former Soviet Prisoner

Within the gang cultures of the world, tattoos, along with piercings, are often associated with forms of art, identification, and allegiance to brotherhood. The gang culture in Russia offers an interesting example of the desire to connect through tattoos. Beginning in the latter days of Imperial Russia, the common experience of corporal punishment created a bond among both men and women within society. Corporal punishments often left flogging marks and other scars that marred inmates' bodies. With these mutilations, people became easily identifiable as Russian/Soviet criminals. These identifiable markers became a problem when some inmates ran away into Serbia. Inmates who fled tried to conceal their scars with tattoos to keep their identity secret. However, this would not last long as the prisons started to use tattoos as a form of serial numbers identification for their inmates. This marking identity imposed on inmates by the prisons simultaneously created an anti-culture and a new gang culture. By the 1920s, as the Soviet union faced even more social class troubles, many of the Russian and Soviet criminals wanted to connect with the ideals and laws associated with past criminals. This created a boom of tattoos among prisoners, that by the late 1920s "about 60-70%" of all inmates had some type of tattoo. This new wave of tattoo among the Russian prisons were seen as a right of passage. Soviet tattoos often indicated a person's socio-demographic status, the crimes they had committed, the prisons they associated with, what drugs they had used, and other habits.

=== United States ===
The first documented professional tattooer in the United States was Martin Hildebrandt, who had enlisted in the United States Navy in the late 1840s where he learned to tattoo, served as a soldier in the American Civil War, and opened a shop in New York City in the early 1870s. In 1891, New York City tattooer Samuel O'Reilly patented the first electric tattoo machine, a modification of Thomas Edison's electric pen.

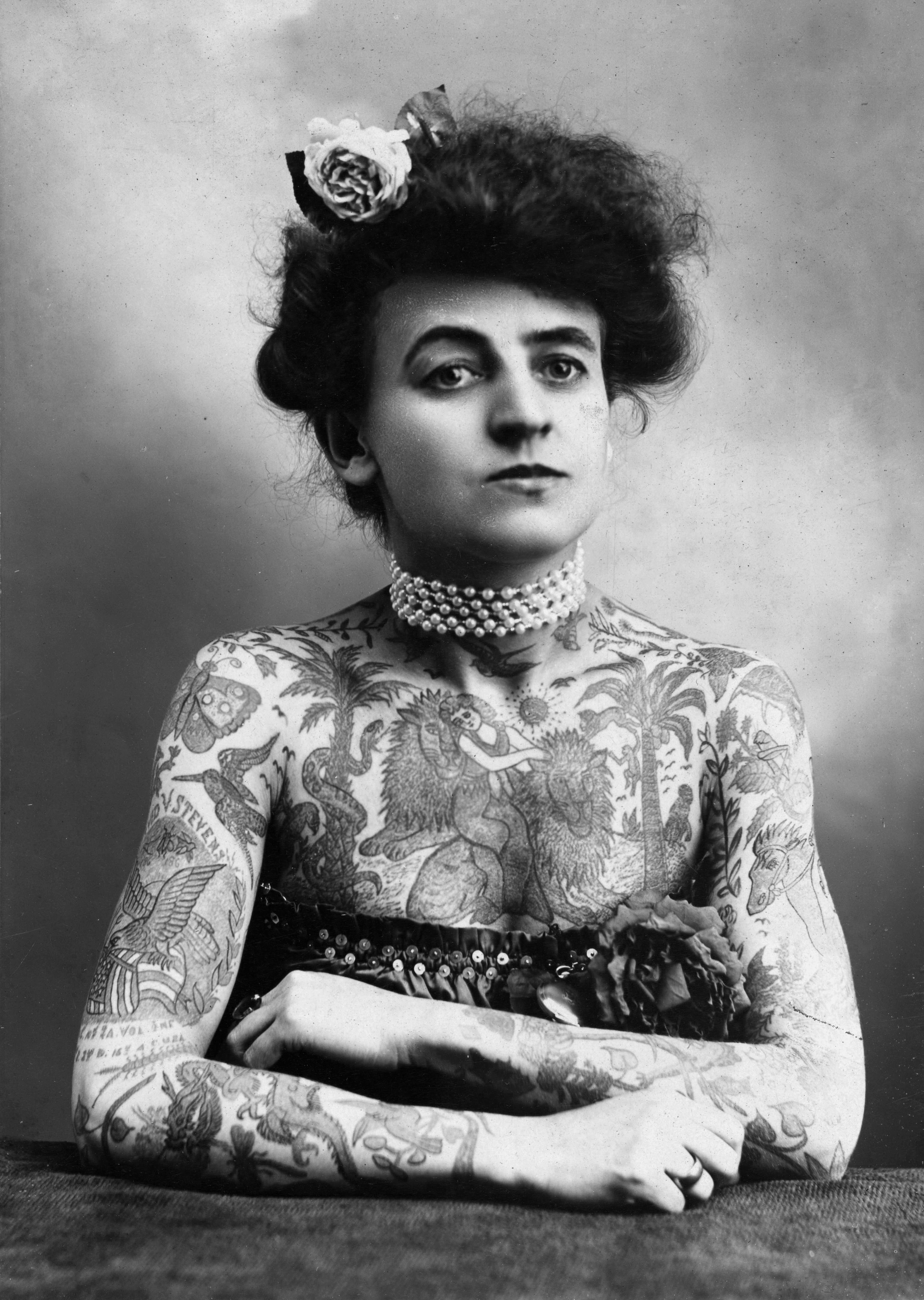
Maud Wagner, one of the earliest Tattooed Ladies that performed in the circus sideshows, 1907

The earliest appearance of tattoos on women during this period were in the circus in the late 19th century. These "Tattooed Ladies" were covered – with the exception of their faces, hands, necks, and other readily visible areas – with various images inked into their skin. To lure the crowd, the earliest ladies, like Betty Broadbent and Nora Hildebrandt told tales of captivity; they usually claimed to have been taken hostage by Native Americans that tattooed them as a form of torture. However, by the late 1920s the sideshow industry was slowing and by the late 1990s the last tattooed lady was out of business. Few people would have tattoos in the 1920s other than sailors and criminals, and while some women would get cosmetic tattoos, this would tend to be kept in secrecy due to tattoos at the time being regarded as deeply associated with criminal activity. In the mid-1930s, however, a dramatic boom would occur for the tattoo industry following the passage of the Social Security Act, with numerous people opting to memorize their social security numbers by having them tattooed. In 1936, 1 in 10 Americans had a tattoo of some form. A significant boom in the tattoo industry would also take place during World War II, with the rise of Sailor Jerry and war time ink. However, tattoos would again be regarded as "bad" by the start of the 1950s. In the late 1950s, tattoos were greatly influenced by several artists, in particular Lyle Tuttle, Cliff Raven, Don Nolan, Zeke Owens and Spider Webb. A second generation of artists, trained by the first, continued these traditions into the 1970s, and included artists such as Bob Roberts, Jamie Summers, Jack Rudy and Don Ed Hardy. Tattooing in the federal Indian boarding school system was commonly practiced during the 1960s and 1970s. Such tattoos often took the form of small markings or initials and were often used as a form of resistance; a way to reclaim one's body.

=== The Tattoo Renaissance ===
Since the 1970s, tattoos have become a mainstream part of global and Western fashion, common among both sexes, to all economic classes, and to age groups from the later teen years to middle age. The decoration of blues singer Janis Joplin with a wristlet and a small heart on her left breast, by the San Francisco tattoo artist Lyle Tuttle, has been called a seminal moment in the popular acceptance of tattoos as art. Formal interest in the art of the tattoo became prominent in the 1970s through the beginning of the 21st century. For many young Americans, the tattoo has taken on a decidedly different meaning than for previous generations. The tattoo has "undergone dramatic redefinition" and has shifted from a form of deviance to an acceptable form of expression. In 1988, scholar Arnold Rubin created a collection of works regarding the history of tattoo cultures, publishing them as the "Marks of Civilization". In this, the term "Tattoo Renaissance" was coined, referring to a period marked by technological, artistic and social change. Wearers of tattoos, as members of the counterculture, began to display their body art as signs of resistance to the values of the white, heterosexual, middle-class. The clientele changed from sailors, bikers, and gang members to the middle and upper class. There was also a shift in iconography from the badge-like images based on repetitive pre-made designs known as flash to customized full-body tattoo influenced by Polynesian and Japanese tattoo art, known as sleeves, which are categorized under the relatively new and popular avant-garde genre. In the early 90s the designs of Leo Zulueta, "the father of modern tribal tattooing", became very popular. Tattooers transformed into "Tattoo Artists": men and women with fine art backgrounds began to enter the profession alongside the older, traditional tattooists.

== 21st century ==
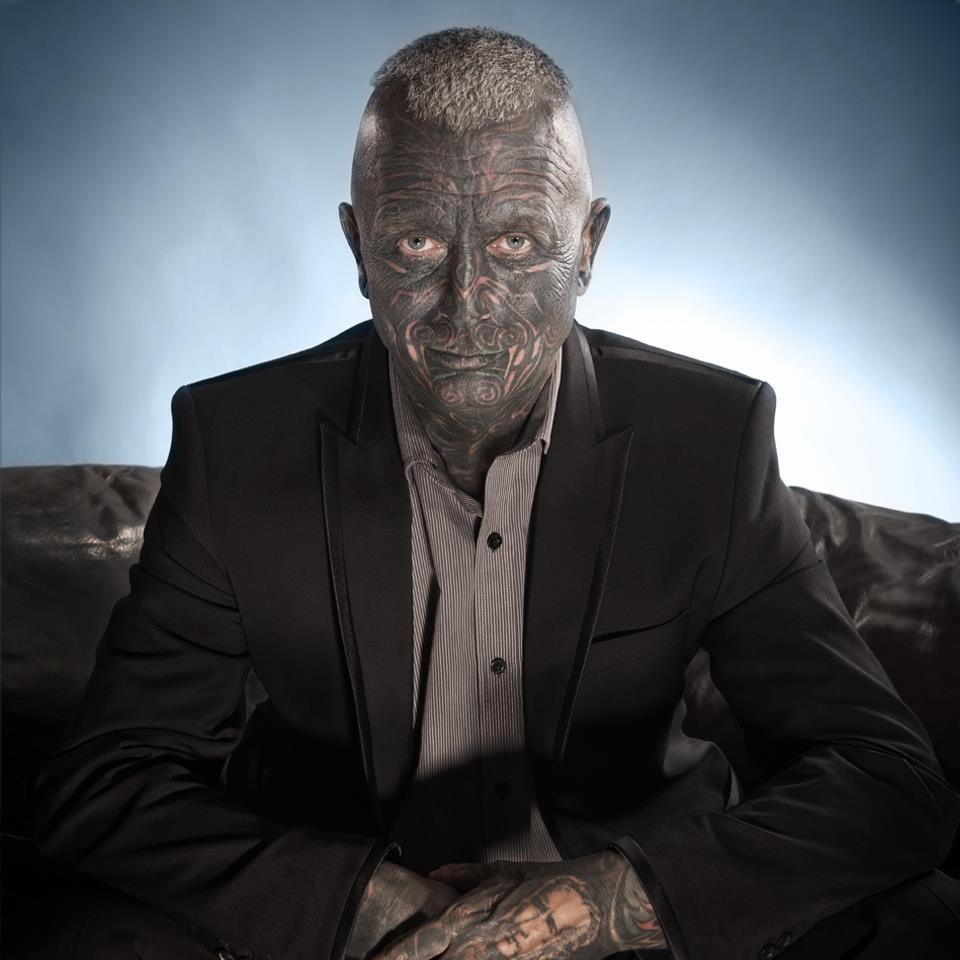
Vladimír Franz was a registered candidate in the 2013 Czech presidential election.

Tattoos have experienced a resurgence in popularity in many parts of the world, particularly in Europe, Japan, and North and South America. The growth in tattoo culture has seen an influx of new artists into the industry, many of whom have technical and fine arts training. Coupled with advancements in tattoo pigments and the ongoing refinement of the equipment used for tattooing, this has led to an improvement in the quality of tattoos being produced. During the 2000s, the presence of tattoos became evident within pop culture, inspiring television shows such as A&E's Inked and TLC's Miami Ink and LA Ink. In addition, many celebrities have made tattoos more acceptable in recent years. Contemporary art exhibitions and visual art institutions have featured tattoos as art through such means as displaying tattoo flash, examining the works of tattoo artists, or otherwise incorporating examples of body art into mainstream exhibits. One such 2009 Chicago exhibition, Freaks & Flash, featured both examples of historic body art as well as the tattoo artists who produced it. In 2010, 25% of Australians under age 30 had tattoos. Mattel released a tattooed Barbie doll in 2011, which was widely accepted, although it did attract some controversy. In recent years, various lawsuits have arisen in the United States regarding the status of tattoos as a copyrightable art form. However, these cases have either been settled out of court or are currently being disputed, and therefore no legal precedent exists directly on point. The process of tattooing was held to be a purely expressive activity protected by the First Amendment by the Ninth Circuit in 2010. Tattoos are valuable identification marks because they tend to be permanent. They can be removed, but they do not fade, The color may, however, change with exposure to the sun. They have recently been very useful in identifying people, such as in the case of a decedent. In today's industrialized cultures, tattoos and piercing are a popular art form shared by many. They are also often perceived to be indicative of defiance, independence, and belonging, such as in prison or gang cultures.

=== Women and tattoos ===
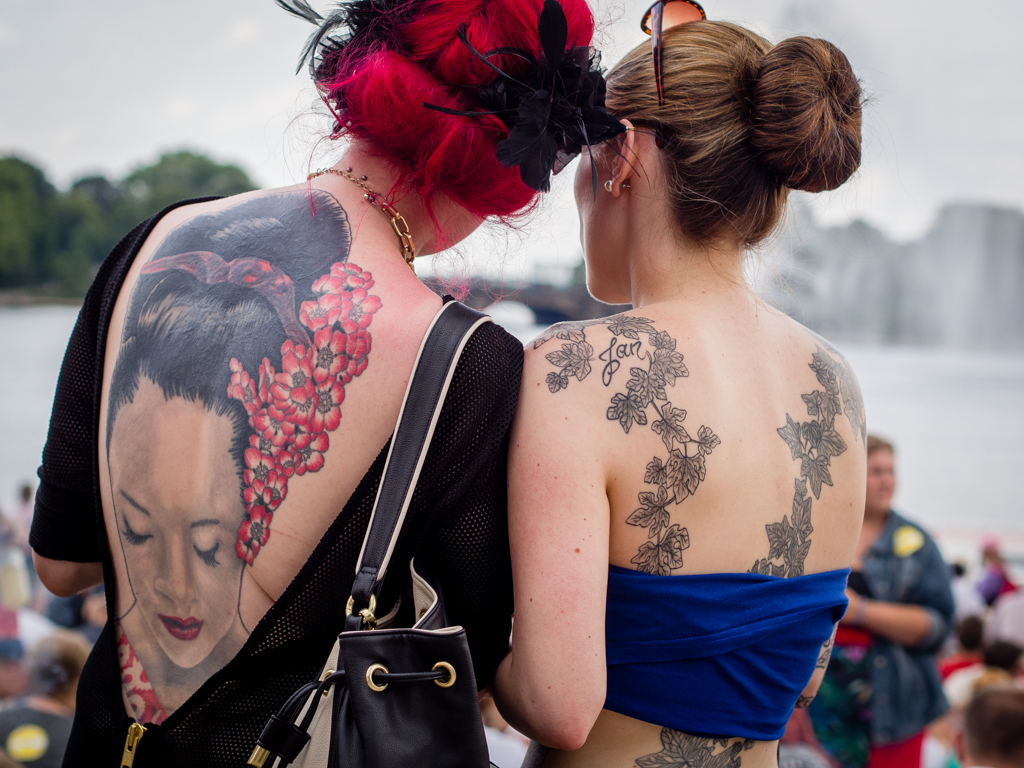
Two women with back tattoos

Author and sociology professor Beverly Yuen Thompson wrote "Covered In Ink: Tattoos, Women, and the Politics of the Body" (published in 2015, research conducted between 2007 and 2010) on the history of tattooing, and how it has been normalized for specific gender roles in the USA. She also released a documentary called "Covered", showing interviews with heavily tattooed women and female tattoo artists in the US. From the distinct history of tattooing, its historical origins and how it transferred to American culture, come transgressive styles which are put in place for tattooed men and women. These "norms" written in the social rules of tattooing imply what is considered the correct way for a gender to be tattooed. Men of tattoo communities are expected to be "heavily tattooed", meaning there are many tattoos which cover multiple parts of the body, and express aggressive or masculine images, such as skulls, zombies, or dragons. Women, on the other hand, are expected to be "lightly tattooed". This means the opposite, in which there are only a small number of tattoos which are placed in areas of the body that are easy to cover up. These images are expected to be more feminine or cute (ex. Fairies, flowers, hearts). When women step outside of the "lightly tattooed" concept by choosing tattoos of a masculine design, and on parts of the body which are not easy to cover (forearms, legs), it is common to face certain types of discrimination from the public. Women who are heavily tattooed can report to being stared at in public, being denied certain employment opportunities, face judgement from members of family, and may even receive sexist or homophobic slurs by strangers. "Bodies of Subversion: A Secret History of Women and Tattoo", by Margot Mifflin, became the first history of women's tattoo art when it was released in 1997. In it, she documents women's involvement in tattooing coinciding to feminist successes, with surges in the 1880s, 1920s and the 1970s. Today, women sometimes use tattoos as forms of bodily reclamation after traumatic experiences like abuse or breast cancer. In 2012, tattooed women outnumbered men for the first time in American history – according to a Harris poll, 23% of women in America had tattoos in that year, compared to 19% of men. In 2013, Miss Kansas, Theresa Vail, became the first Miss America contestant to show off tattoos during the swimsuit competition — the insignia of the U.S. Army Dental Corps on her left shoulder and one of the "Serenity Prayer" along the right side of her torso.

=== Advertising ===
In the mid-2000s, some dot com companies paid people to get visible tattoos of their logos as a publicity stunt, a practice sometimes called "skinvertising". This had a negative impact on the lives of some of the people who agreed. In the mid-2010s, some companies offered people free tattoos of brand-related designs if they agreed that the company could use photos in advertisements. A few restaurants have offered free meals to people who get the logo of the establishment tattooed on a visible part of their bodies, and some people have taken them up on the offer.

== Military's role in tattoos in the United States ==
Old School Tattoo Flash Style. Patriotic Subject.

Military and warfare have had a direct impact on the purpose, subject matter, and reception of tattoos in American popular culture. The first recorded tattoo artist in the United States was Martin Hildebrandt, who in 1846, was tattooing sailors and soldiers with patriotic tattoos of flags and battles. While this helped push tattooing into a popular light, simultaneously "tattooed freaks", like P. T. Barnum's "Prince Constantine", were inadvertently counteracting this, and keeping the world of tattooing out of everyday life. It was not until the invention of the electric tattoo machine in the 1880s by Samuel O'Reilly that tattooing became a little socially acceptable. Still, O'Reilly reported in the 1880s that most of his clients were sailors. A 1908 Article in American Anthropologist reported that 75% of sailors in the U.S. Navy were tattooed. These findings led to one of the first U.S. military regulations on tattoos in 1909, which concerned the subject matter of the tattoos allowed to be pictured on servicemen.

=== World Wars ===
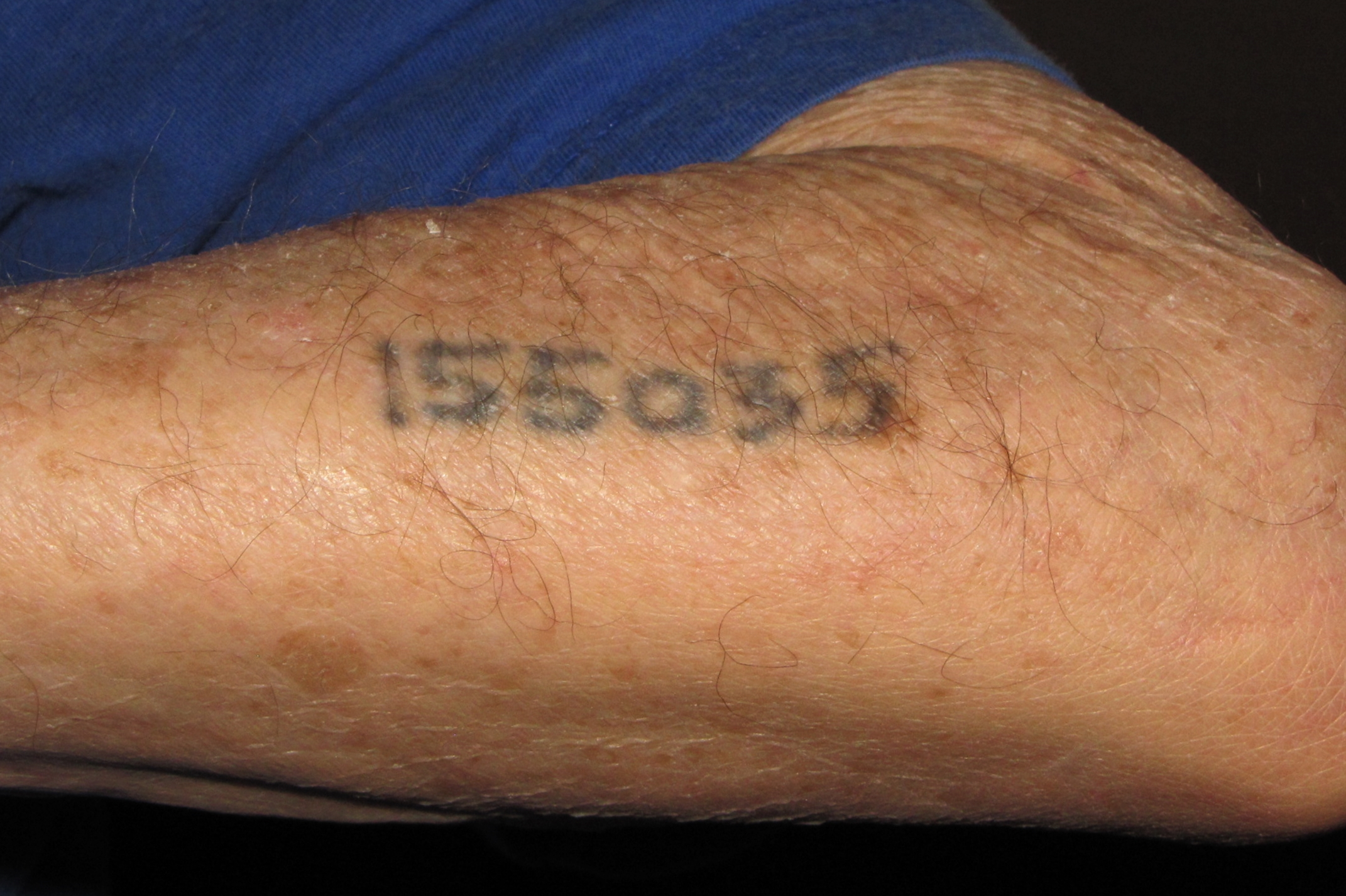
Jerzy Kamieniecki, displaying his Auschwitz tattoo

As World War I ravaged the globe, it also ravaged the popularity of tattooing, pushing tattoos even farther under the umbrella of delinquency. What credence tattoos got as symbols of patriotism and war badges in the eyes of the public was demolished as servicemen moved away from the proud flags motifs and into more sordid depictions. At the beginning of the Second World War, tattooing once again experienced a boom in popularity as now not only sailors in the Navy, but soldiers in the Army and fliers in the Air Force, were once again tattooing their national pride onto their bodies. The famous tattoo artist Charles Wagner said "Funny Thing about War, fighting men just want to be marked in some way or another" as a way of reasoning for its resurgence in popularity. The hype was short lived, as the craft of tattooing received a major backlash at the end of the Second World War, as stories from survivors abroad made it back to the United States. During the Second World War, the Nazis, under the order of Adolf Hitler, rounded up those deemed "subhumans" into concentration camps. Once there, if they were chosen to live, they were tattooed with numbers onto their arms. Tattoos and Nazism become intertwined, and the extreme distaste for Nazi Germany and fascism led to a stronger public outcry against tattooing.

=== Post World Wars ===
This backlash would further worsen with the use of a tattooed man in a 1950s Marlboro advertisement, which strengthened the public's view that tattoos were no longer for patriotic servicemen, but for criminals and degenerates. The public distaste was so strong by this point that the usual trend of seeing tattoo popularity spike during times of war was not seen in the Vietnam War. It would take two more decades, and creators like Lyle Tuttle and Ed Hardy in 1970, Freddy Negrete and Jack Rudy in 1980, and celebrity patrons like Janis Joplin, Peter Fonda, and Cher, for tattooing to finally be brought back into society's good graces.

=== 2000s to present ===
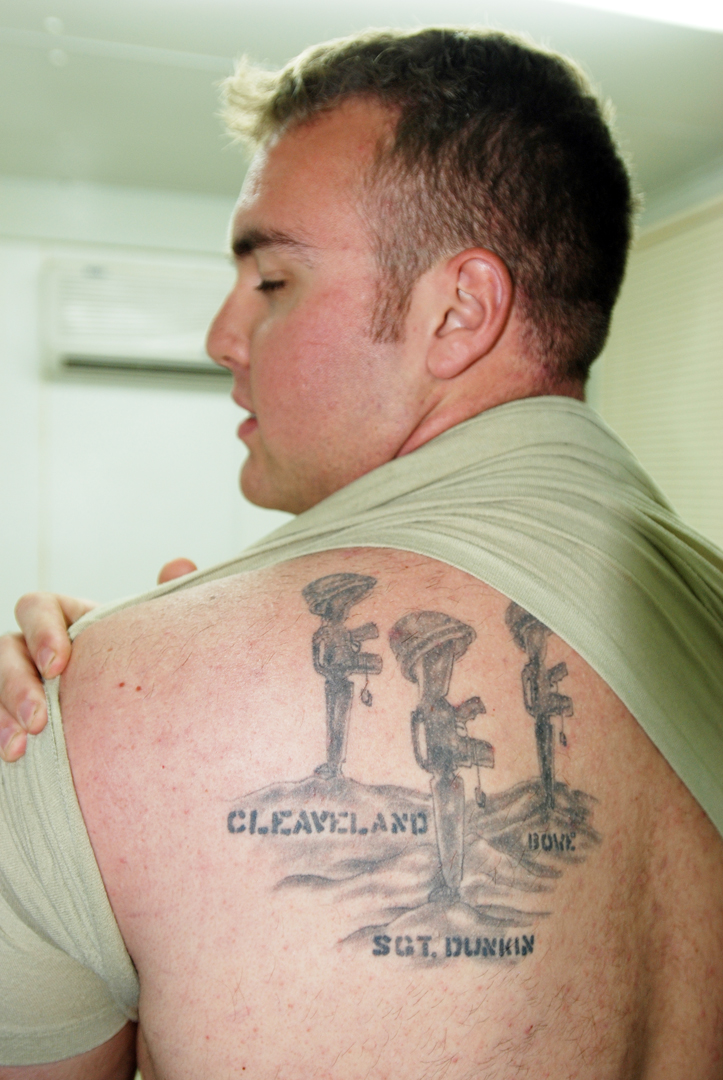
Tattoo in memorial to fallen comrades

Starting in the early 2000s, tattoos and the military began to reconnect, as tattoos became a symbolic and popular way to show social and political views. Tattoos were being used by soldiers to show belonging, affiliation, and to mark down their war experiences. Rites of passage in the military were marked with tattoos, like when one completes basic training or returns home from service. Modern military tattoos in the United States became less about valor and honor, but about recognizing the experiences, losses, and struggles of servicemen. Tattoos can now be seen and perceived as ways to convey loss and grief, guilt and anger, as ways to highlight the transformational nature of war on individuals, and even convey a hope for a better nation and self. The history of tattooing in the U.S. can be seen to have been influenced and affected by war and the military. Though its expression and reception by the public are constantly in flux, both practices are deeply connected and still effect one another today. Dyvik writes in her article, War Ink: Sense Making and Curating War Through Military Tattoos, that "war lingers in and on the bodies and lifeworlds of those who have practiced it"
