= Process of tattooing =

Overview of the process or technique of tattooing

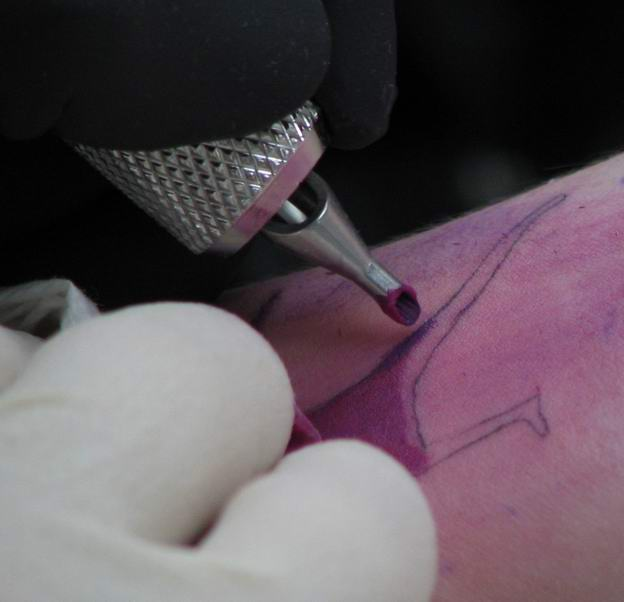
Modern tattoo machine in use: here outfitted with a 5-needle setup, but number of needles depends on size and shading desired.

The process or technique of tattooing, creating a tattoo, involves the insertion of pigment (via tattoo ink) into the skin's dermis. Traditionally, tattooing often involved rubbing pigment into cuts. Most modern tattoo artists use tattoo machines, and many countries require strict procedures and accessories to reduce the risk of health effects of tattoos.

== Physiological process of tattooing ==
Tattooing involves the placement of pigment into the skin's dermis, the layer of dermal tissue underlying the epidermis. After initial injection, pigment is dispersed throughout a homogenized damaged layer down through the epidermis and upper dermis, in both of which the presence of foreign material activates the immune system's phagocytes to engulf the pigment particles. As healing proceeds, the damaged epidermis flakes away (eliminating surface pigment), while deeper in the skin, granulation tissue forms, which is later converted to connective tissue by collagen growth. This mends the upper dermis, where pigment remains trapped within fibroblasts, ultimately concentrating in a layer just below the dermis/epidermis boundary. Its presence there is stable, but in the long term (decades) the pigment tends to migrate deeper into the dermis, accounting for the degraded detail of old tattoos.

== Traditional tattooing ==
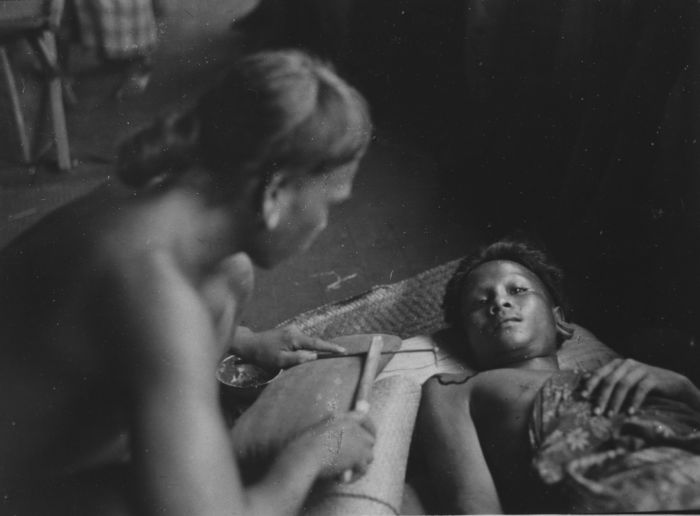
Traditional tattooing among the Dayak people of West Borneo, c. 1927

Some tribal cultures traditionally created tattoos by cutting designs into the skin and rubbing the resulting wound with ink, ashes, or other agents. Some cultures continue this practice, which may be an adjunct to scarification. Some cultures create tattooed marks by hand-tapping the ink into the skin by using sharpened sticks or animal bones (made like needles) with clay formed disks or, in modern times, needles. Traditional Japanese tattoos (irezumi) are still "hand-poked", that is, the ink is inserted beneath the skin using non-electrical, hand-made and hand-held tools with needles of sharpened bamboo or steel. This method is known as tebori. Similarly, Sak Yant tattoos from Southeast Asia (mostly Thailand) are traditionally hand-poked using a steel or (now rarely) bamboo rod that is finished with a needle, called Khem Sak.

Traditional Hawaiian hand-tapped tattoos are experiencing a renaissance, after the practice was nearly extinguished in the years following Western contact. The process involves lengthy protocols and prayers, and is considered a sacred rite more than an application of artwork. The tattooist chooses the design, rather than the wearer, based upon genealogical information. Each design is symbolic of the wearer's personal responsibility and role in the community. Tools are hand-carved from bone or tusk without the use of metal.

== Modern tattooing ==
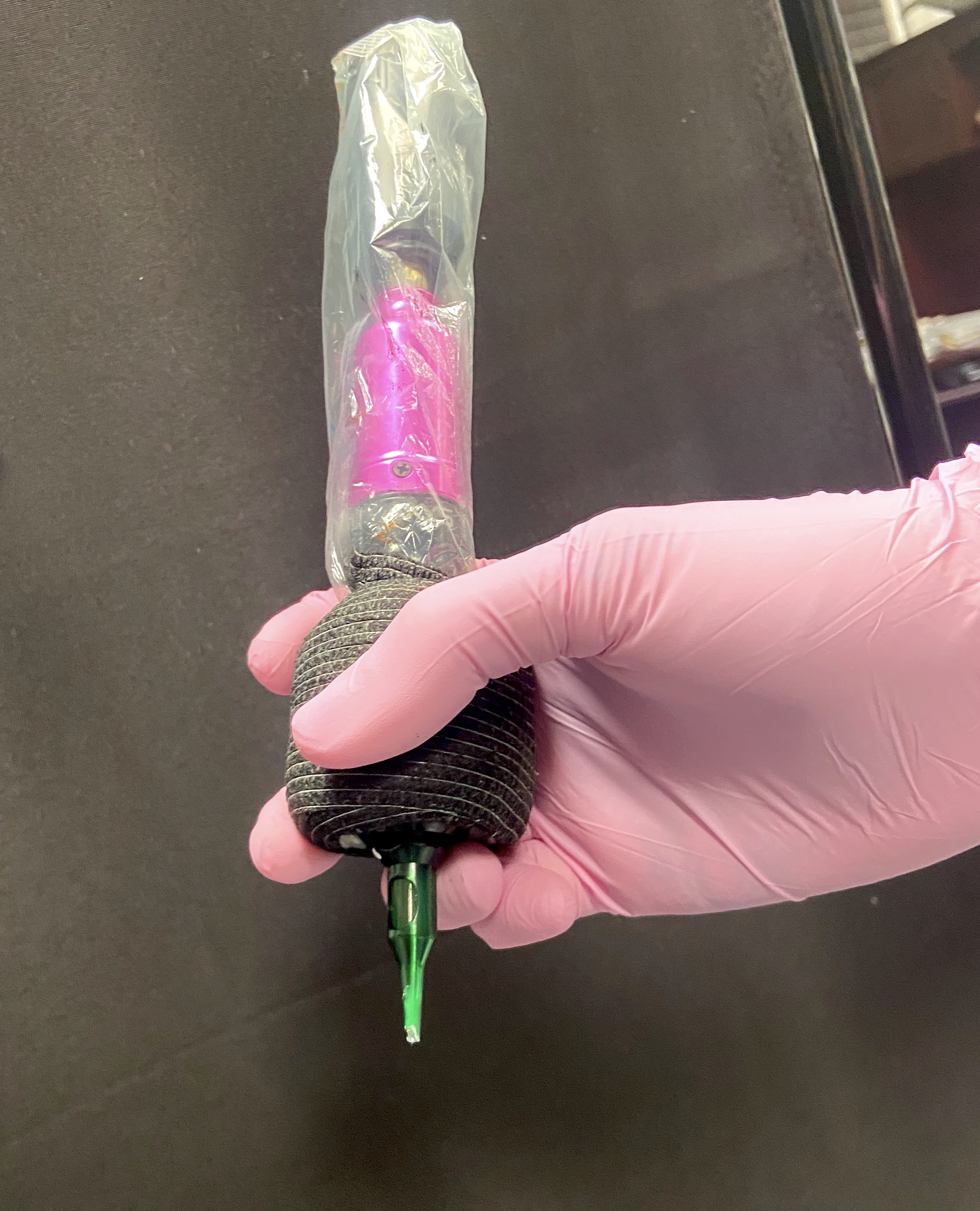
Pen rotary style tattoo machine wrapped in plastic for sanitary practice and tape wrapped around tattoo machine to increase hand stability and ergonomic health

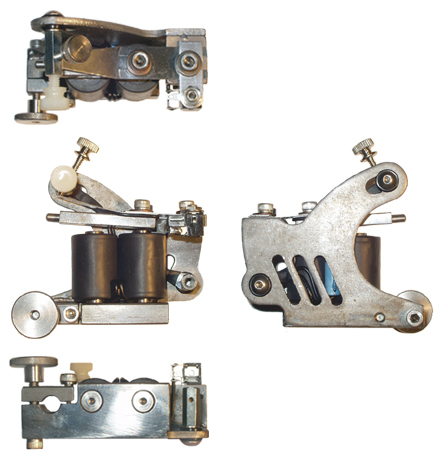
Traditional two coil tattoo machine

The most common method of tattooing in modern times is the electric tattoo machine, which inserts ink into the skin via a single needle or a group of needles that are soldered onto a bar, which is attached to an oscillating unit. The unit rapidly and repeatedly drives the needles in and out of the skin, usually 80 to 150 times a second. This modern procedure is ordinarily sanitary. The needles are single-use needles that come packaged individually. The tattoo artist must wash his or her hands and must also wash the area that will be tattooed. Gloves must be worn at all times and the wound must be wiped frequently with a wet disposable towel of some kind. The equipment must be sterilized in a certified autoclave before and after every use.

Prices for this service vary widely globally and locally, depending upon the complexity of the tattoo, the skill and expertise of the artist, the attitude of the customer, the costs of running a business, the economics of supply and demand, etc. The time it takes to get a tattoo is in proportion with its size and complexity. A small one of simple design might take 15 minutes, whereas an elaborate sleeve tattoo or back piece requires multiple sessions that may consist of several hours at a time ranging over months or even years.

In 1891, the first electric tattoo needle was patented in New York City by Samuel O'Reilly, who modified Thomas Edison's electric engraving pen. O'Reilly's machine was based on the rotary technology of the electric engraving device invented by Thomas Edison. Modern tattoo machines use electromagnetic coils. Another early tattoo machine, with an electromagnetic coil, was patented by Sutherland MacDonald in 1894. The first twin-coil machine, the predecessor of the modern configuration, was invented by another Englishman, Alfred Charles South of London, in 1899. The rotary tattoo machine was developed from 1974 to 1978 by the German tattoo artists Horst Streckenbach (1929–2001) and Manfred Kohrs.

=== Permanent makeup ===
Permanent makeup or semi-permanent makeup tattoos are cosmetic tattoos that are meant to alter pigmentation in the facial features. Some types of permanent makeup are used for medical conditions, such as to cover-up scars or vitiligo, while other types are simply for aesthetic reasons like tattooing eyeliner, lip color, or eyebrows. The pigment is inserted into the surface of the skin in patterns to be able to cover the desired areas.

Permanent makeup is typically done with some form of tattoo machine. There are machines now that do not have a needle, which are intended to result in less painful procedures. These needle-free devices are considered safer and more sterile to use than traditional tattoo machines. They are designed to create a more comfortable experience during the application process, and to eliminate the possibility of spreading diseases such as HIV, hepatitis, and other healthcare issues. The needle-less device is also capable of inserting the pigment deeper into the skin than machines that use needles.

There are several different ways to get rid of these tattoos, the most common being laser removals. It is suggested that different color pigments should be removed with different lasers in order to reduce the risk of scarring and ink retention. The needle-free machines also have the capability of removing or lightening the pigment from the skin as well by adding in a removal solution into the skin.

Permanent makeup or micropigmentation is much like any tattoo and can have side effects over time. Infections, fading, scarring, inflammation, and allergic reactions are just a few of the side effects that have been reported from patients who received permanent makeup procedures.

=== Nipple-areola Tattoos ===
Tattoos have also made an entrance into the medical field. Nipple-areola tattoos are a form of medical tattoos that can be done for those who lost their nipple during a mastectomy and had breast reconstruction surgery. The tattoo artist tries to recreate the same pigment and shape as the original nipple and areola, although it may not always result in an exact replica as the patient's old nipple. The tattoo may not be the exact or desired shade of the nipple that the patient originally had because the artist may make the tattoo a bit darker in order for the tattoo to lighten up over time, ultimately resulting in the correct shade. The machine that is used during the procedure will also affect the color that the tattoo has and how the pigment will react with the skin.

Not all nipple-areola tattoos are successful. There is a chance that the tattoo could get infected just as any tattoo can. In a study from 1988—1993 of 103 patients who received nipple-areola tattoos, 5 patients reported getting an infection, 1 patient reported getting a rash, one reported getting slough, and 19 patients had to have their tattoo touched up due to the pigment diminishing from the tattoo through the healing process.

Nipple-areola tattoos tend to be one of the final steps to breast reconstruction surgery. In the study of those who received the tattoos, 86% said that they would get the procedure done again if they needed to.

=== Dyes and pigments ===
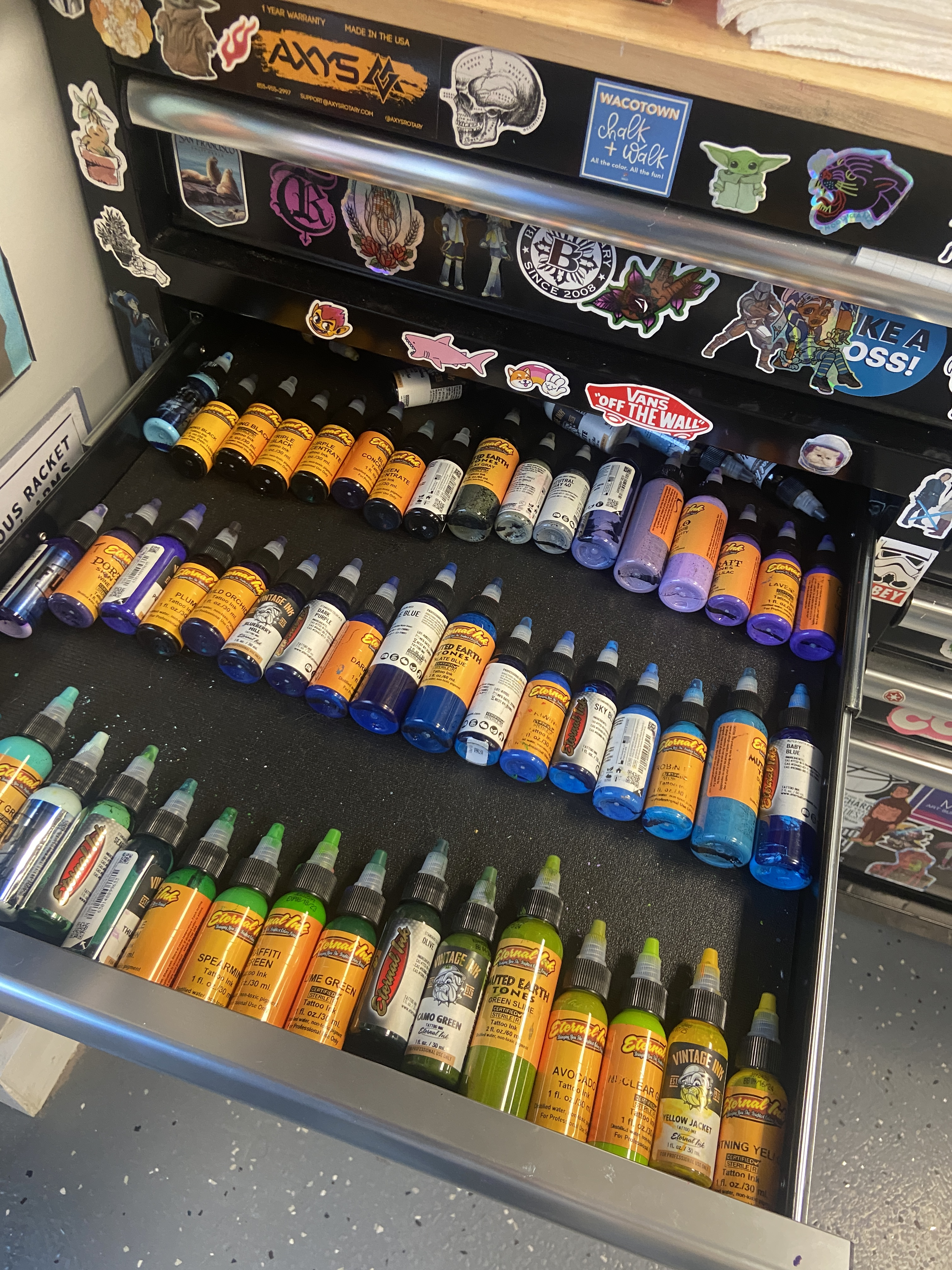
A variety of inks at a station in a tattoo shop

Early tattoo inks were obtained directly from nature and were extremely limited in pigment variety. In ancient Hawaii, for example, kukui nut ash was blended with coconut oil to produce an ebony ink. Today, an almost unlimited number of colors and shades of tattoo ink are mass-produced and sold to parlors worldwide. Tattoo artists commonly mix these inks to create their own unique pigments.

A wide range of dyes and pigments can be used in tattoos, from inorganic materials like titanium dioxide and iron oxides to carbon black, azo dyes, and acridine, quinoline, phthalocyanine and naphthol derivatives, dyes made from ash, and other mixtures. Iron oxide pigments are used in greater extent in cosmetic tattooing.

Concern has been expressed over the interaction between magnetic resonance imaging (MRI) procedures and tattoo pigments, some of which contain trace metals. The magnetic fields produced by MRI machines interact with these metals, including nonferrous metal particles, and while rare, are capable of causing first-degree or second-degree burns or distortions in the image. The type and density of the ink as well as shape of the tattoo may increase the risk, particularly if the shape approximates an RF pick-up loop. The television show MythBusters tested the hypothesis, and found a slight interaction between commonly used tattoo inks and MRI. The interaction was stronger with inks containing high levels of iron oxide.

=== Studio hygiene ===
==== Procedures ====
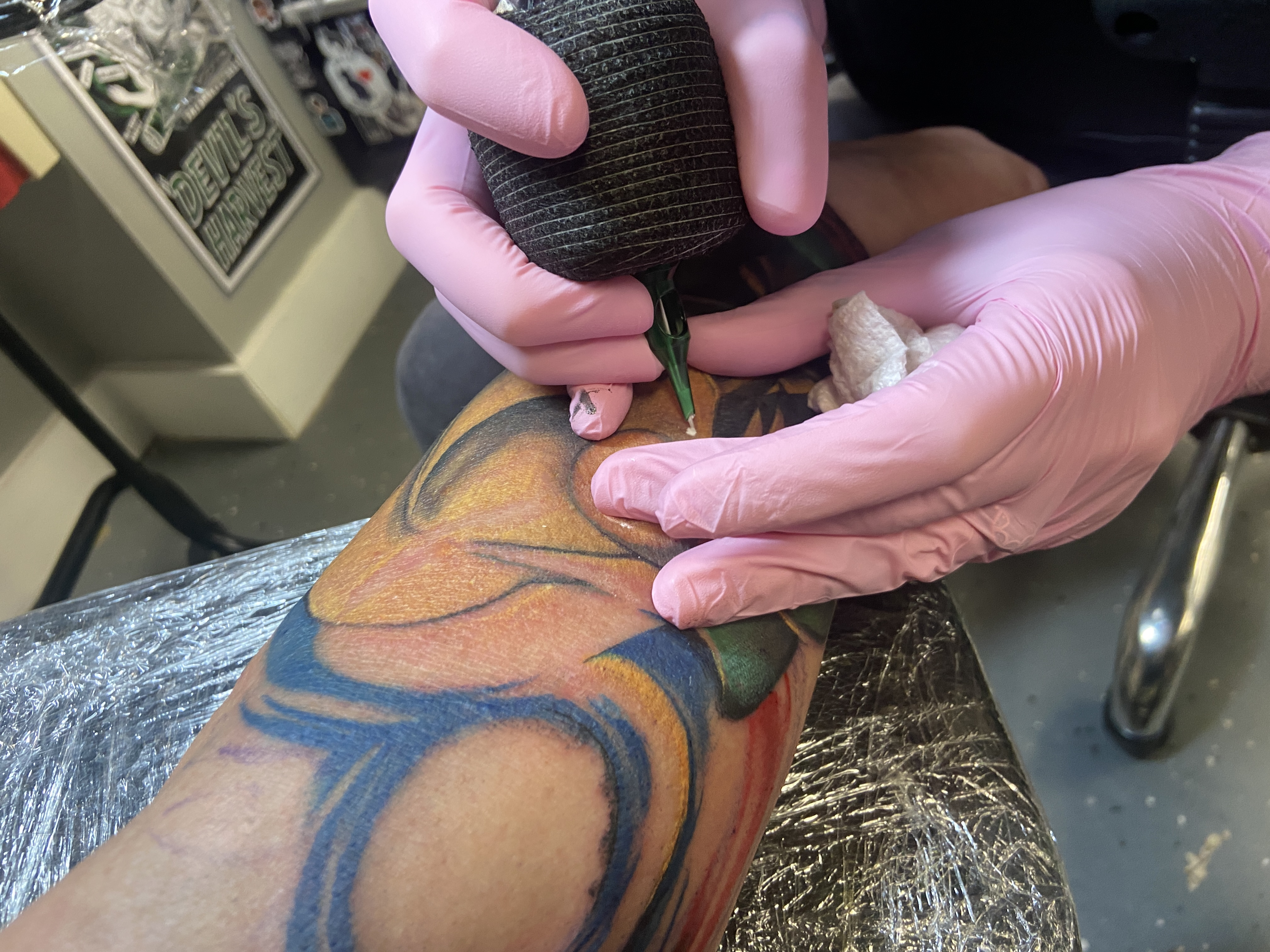
Tattoo artist wearing disposable nitrile gloves during tattooing procedure for hygiene

The properly equipped tattoo studio will use biohazard containers for objects that have come into contact with blood or bodily fluids, sharps containers for old needles, and an autoclave for sterilizing tools. Certain jurisdictions also require studios by law to have a sink in the work area supplied with both hot and cold water.

Proper hygiene requires a body modification artist to wash his or her hands before starting to prepare a client for the stencil, between clients, and at any other time when cross contamination can occur. The use of single use gloves is also mandatory and disposed after each stage of tattooing. The same gloves should not be used to clean the tattoo station, tattoo the client, and clean the tattoo.

In some states and countries it is illegal to tattoo a minor even with parental consent, and (except in the case of medical tattoos) it is forbidden to tattoo impaired persons, people with contraindicated skin conditions, those who are pregnant or nursing, those incapable of consent due to mental incapacity, or those under the influence of alcohol or other drugs.

Before the tattooing begins the client is asked to approve the final position of the applied stencil. After approval is given the artist will open new, sterile needle packages in front of the client, and always use new, sterile, or sterile disposable instruments and supplies, and fresh ink for each session (loaded into disposable ink caps which are discarded after each client). Also, all areas which may be touched with contaminated gloves will be wrapped in clear plastic to prevent cross-contamination. Equipment that cannot be autoclaved (such as counter tops, machines, and furniture) will be wiped with an approved disinfectant.

==== Incentives for continuing education ====
Membership in professional organizations or certificates of appreciation/achievement generally help artists to be aware of the latest trends. Most tattooists do not belong to any association.

==== Training and certification requirements ====
While specific requirements to become a tattooist vary between jurisdictions, many jurisdictions mandate only formal training in blood-borne pathogens and cross-contamination. The local department of health regulates tattoo studios in many jurisdictions. For example, according to the health departments in Oregon and Hawaii, tattoo artists in these states are required to take and pass a test which ascertains their knowledge of health and safety precautions, as well as the current state regulations. Performing a tattoo in Oregon without a proper and current license, or in an unlicensed facility, is a felony offense. Tattooing was legalized in New York City in 1997, in Massachusetts in 2000, and in Oklahoma between 2002 and 2006.

=== Aftercare ===
Tattoo-specific salves have become widespread in recent years.

Tattoo artists and people with tattoos vary widely in their preferred methods of caring for new tattoos. Some artists recommend keeping a new tattoo wrapped for the first 24 hours, while other artists suggest removing temporary bandaging after two hours or less, to allow the skin to breathe. Many tattooists advise against allowing too much contact with hot tubs, pool water, or soaking in a tub for the first two weeks, to prevent the tattoo ink from washing-out. In contrast, other artists suggest that a new tattoo be bathed in very hot water early.

General consensus for care advises against removing the flakes or scab that may form on a new tattoo, and avoiding exposing a new tattoo to the sun for extended periods for at least three weeks; both of these can contribute to fading of the image. It is agreed that a new tattoo needs to be kept clean. Various products may be recommended for application to the skin, ranging from those intended for the treatment of cuts, burns, and scrapes, to panthenol, cocoa butter, A&D, hemp, lanolin, or salves. Oil-based ointments are almost always recommended for use on very thin layers, due to their inability to evaporate and therefore over-hydrate the already perforated skin. Recent scientific studies have demonstrated that wounds that are kept moist heal faster than wounds which heal under dry conditions. In recent years, specific commercial products have been developed for tattoo aftercare. Although opinions about these products vary, soap and warm water work well to keep a tattoo clean and free from infection. It is advised that fragrance-free soaps and soaps that contain alcohol not be used to clean the tattoo, to avoid burning or drying-out the tattoo too quickly. Try to avoid loofahs and unwashed clothes, which both can contain bacteria that could get into the tattoo and cause an infection. The best way to dry your tattoo is to use a paper towel, as regular towels may also contain bacteria, even if they are just washed.

The amount of ink that remains in the skin throughout the healing process determines how the final tattoo will look. If a tattoo becomes infected or the flakes fall off too soon (e.g., if it absorbs too much water and sloughs off early or is picked or scraped off), then the ink will not be properly fixed in the skin, and the final image will be negatively affected.

== Regulations ==
France has had hygiene regulations for tattooing and piercing since 2008. On March 6, 2013, France banned the use of nine common color tattoo inks, including red, orange, and yellow pigments. The ban took effect on January 1, 2014. Tattoo artists in France must comply with the hygiene and safety regulations of the National Health Security Agency (ANSM). If they violate the regulations, they can be fined up to €1,500.

The European Union banned the use of 25 red, orange, and yellow color tattoo inks on January 4, 2022. The ban on the Blue 15:3 and Green 7 pigments is scheduled to take effect in 2023.

Vietnam still considers tattoos to be a sensitive issue and has many restrictive regulations. According to Vietnamese law, tattoos are not completely banned. However, there are some cases in which tattoos are not allowed, including: People under the age of 18, people with mental illness or other conditions that could affect the tattoo, people who are currently serving a prison sentence.

In the United States there is no federal law regulating the practice of tattooing. However, all 50 states and the District of Columbia have statutory laws requiring a person receiving a tattoo be at least 18 years old. This is partially based on the legal principle that a minor cannot enter into a legal contract or otherwise render informed consent for a procedure. Most states permit a person under the age of 18 to receive a tattoo with permission of a parent or guardian, but some states prohibit tattooing under a certain age regardless of permission, with the exception of medical necessity (such as markings placed for radiation therapy).
