= The Tattooed Lady =

The Tattooed Lady can refer to:

- Tattooed Lady, a popular type of attraction in the United States in the early 20th century
- "The Tattooed Lady", a 1940s novelty song recorded by The Kingston Trio on the 1960 album String Along
- "The Tattooed Lady", a 1952 novelty song by Skeets McDonald
- "Tattoo'd Lady", a song by Rory Gallagher from the 1973 album Tattoo
- "She Sits Down on Me", a 1940s song written and recorded by The Talbot Brothers of Bermuda, recorded by Benny Bell as "The Tattooed Lady"

== See also ==
- "Lydia the Tattooed Lady", a 1939 song
