= Health effects of tattoos =

Overview of health effects resulting from tattooing

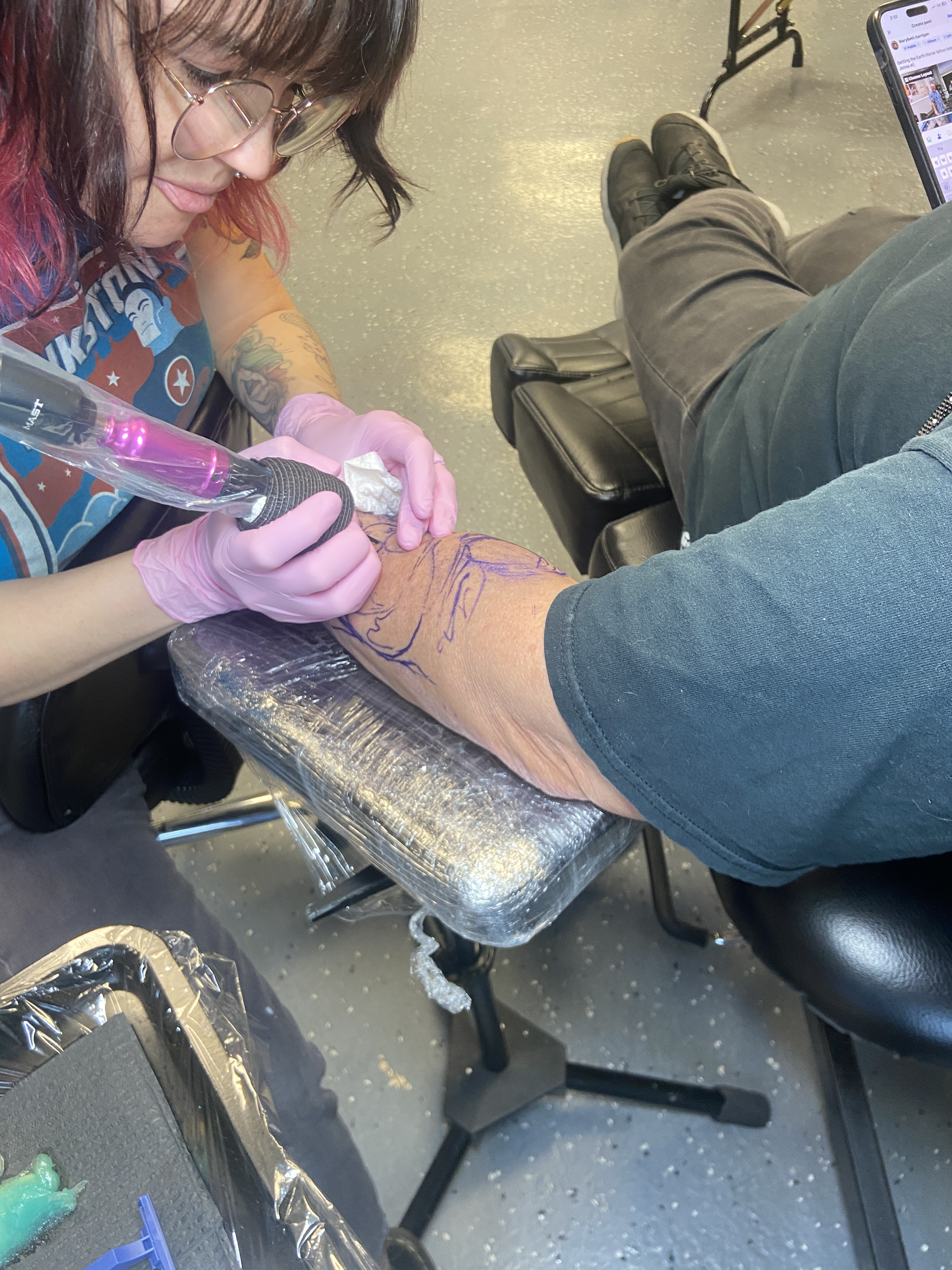
Tattoo artist wearing disposable gloves to help prevent health issues

A variety of health effects can result from getting a tattoo. Because the process of tattooing requires breaking the skin barrier, tattooing carries inherent health risks, including infection and allergic reactions. Modern tattoo artists reduce such risks by following strict health precautions, including working with single-use disposable needles and sterilising tattoo machines and other equipment after each use. Many jurisdictions require tattoo artists to undergo periodic bloodborne pathogen training, such as is provided through the Red Cross and the U.S. Occupational Safety and Health Administration.

Dermatologists have observed rare but severe medical complications from tattoo pigments in the body, and have noted that people acquiring tattoos rarely assess health risks prior to receiving their tattoos. Some medical practitioners have recommended greater regulation of pigments used in tattoo ink. The wide range of pigments currently used in tattoo inks may create unforeseen health problems.

== Risk of infection ==
Since tattoo instruments come in contact with blood and bodily fluids, diseases may be transmitted if the instruments are used on more than one person without being sterilised. However, infection from tattooing in clean and modern tattoo studios employing single-use needles is rare. With amateur tattoos, such as prison tattoos, however, there is an elevated risk of infection. To address this problem, a programme was introduced in Canada in 2005 that provides legal tattooing in prisons, both to reduce health risks and to provide inmates with a marketable skill. Inmates were to be trained to staff and operate the tattoo parlours once six of them opened successfully.

In the United States, the Red Cross prohibits a person who has received a tattoo from donating blood for three months, unless the procedure was done in a state-regulated and licensed studio, using sterile technique. The District of Columbia, Idaho, Maryland, Massachusetts, New Hampshire, New York, Pennsylvania, and Wyoming do not have a rigorous licensing and regulation (e.g. bloodborne pathogen training) program, meaning that people who receive tattoos there are subject to the 3-month deferral regardless of the hygienic standards of the studio. Similarly, the UK does not provide certification for tattooists, and blood donations are prohibited without exception for four months following a tattoo.

Infections that can theoretically be transmitted by the use of unsterilised tattoo equipment or contaminated ink include surface infections of the skin, hepatitis B, hepatitis C, tuberculosis, and HIV. However, no person in the United States is reported to have contracted HIV via a commercially applied tattooing process. Washington state's OSHA studies have suggested that since the needles used in tattooing are not hollow, in the case of a needle stick injury the amount of fluids transmitted may be small enough that HIV would be difficult to transmit. Tetanus risk is reduced by having an up-to-date tetanus booster prior to being tattooed. According to the Centers for Disease Control and Prevention, of 13,387 hepatitis cases in the USA in 1995, 12 cases (0.09%) were associated with tattoo parlours; by comparison, 43 cases (0.32%) were associated with dentists' offices.

In 2006, the CDC reported 3 clusters with 44 cases of methicillin-resistant staph infection traced to unlicensed tattooists.

== Reactions to inks ==
Perhaps due to the mechanism whereby the skin's immune system encapsulates pigment particles in fibrous tissue, tattoo inks have been described as "remarkably nonreactive histologically". However, some allergic reactions have been medically documented. No estimate of the overall incidence of allergic reactions to tattoo pigments exists. Allergies to latex are apparently more common than to inks; many artists will use non-latex gloves when requested. Tattoos may even trigger a positive immune response by strengthening it.

=== Allergy to metals ===
People who are sensitive or allergic to certain metals may react to pigments in the skin with swelling, itching, or oozing of clear fluid called serum. Such reactions are quite rare, however, and some artists will recommend performing a test patch. Because the mercury and azo-chemicals in red dyes are more commonly allergenic than other pigments, allergic reactions are most often seen in red tattoos. Less frequent allergic reactions to black, purple, and green pigments have also been noted. Tattoo inks contaminated with metal allergens have been known to cause severe reactions, sometimes years later, when the original ink is not available for testing; see metal allergy.

Metallic salts are prevalent in tattoo inks. A 3-by-5-inch (76 by 127 mm) tattoo may contain from 1 to 23 micrograms (1.5×10^{−5} to 0.000355 gr) of lead, but there is insufficient evidence to assess whether the metallic salts are harmful at this dosage and via this method. However, in 2005, there were no reports of metal toxicity from tattoo ink.

=== Photosensitisation ===
Allergic reactions to tattoo pigments, while uncommon, are most often seen with red, yellow, and occasionally white. Tattoos that are exposed to the sun may result in an allergic reaction, particularly those that contain yellow tattoo ink. Yellow and some red pigments contain cadmium sulfide, which can cause an allergic reaction when exposed to the sun.

=== Allergy to organic pigments ===
Organic pigments (i.e., non-heavy metal pigments) may also pose health concerns. A European Commission noted that close to 40% of organic tattoo colorants used in Europe had not been approved for cosmetic use, and that under 20% of colorants contained a carcinogenic aromatic amine.

== MRI complications ==
A few cases of burns on tattoos caused by MRI scans have been documented. Problems tend to occur with designs containing large areas of black ink, since black commonly contains iron oxide; the MRI scanner causes the iron to heat up either by inducing an electric current or hysteresis. Burning can occur on smaller tattoos such as "permanent makeup", but this is rare.

== Dermal conditions ==
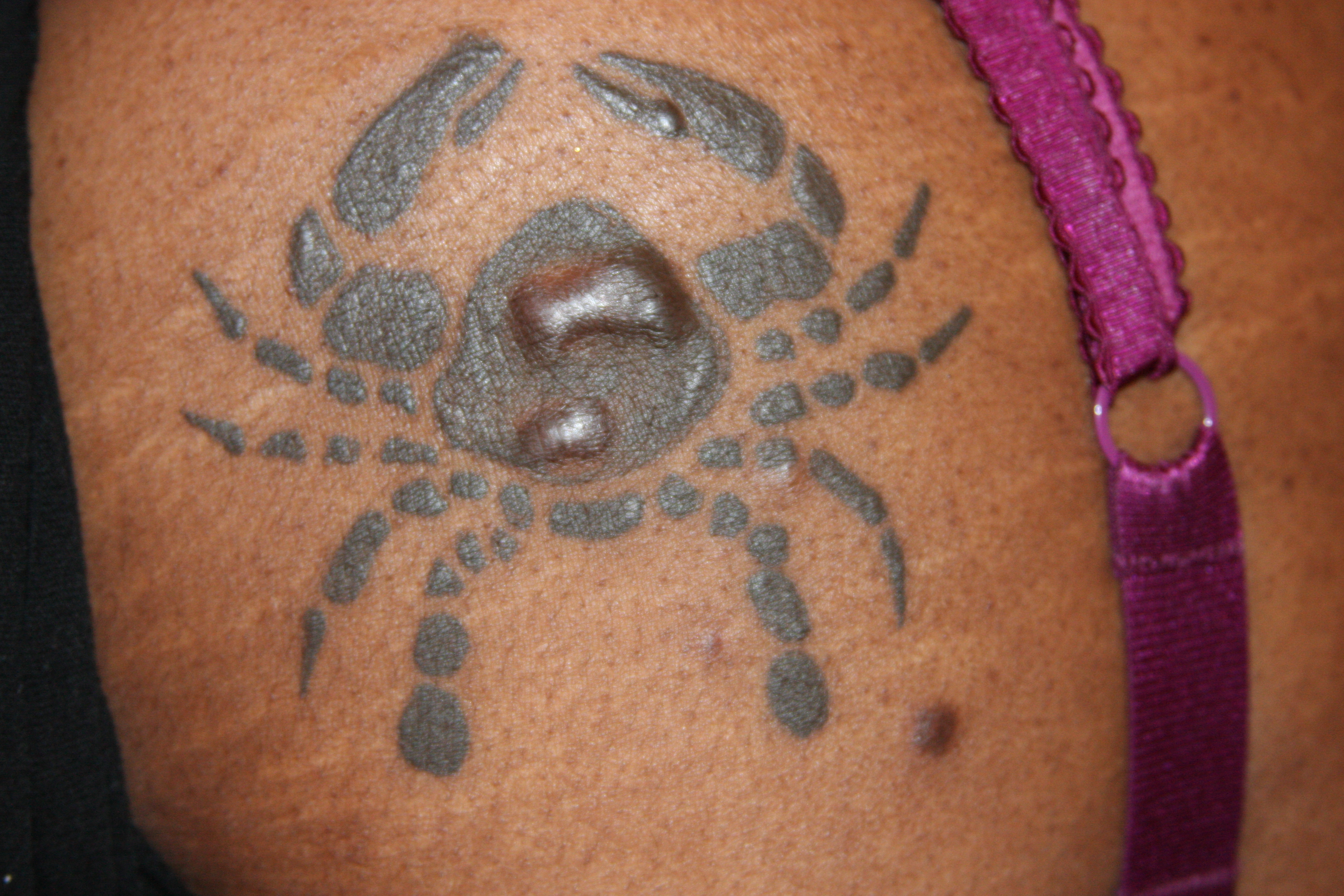
Keloid formation at the site of a tattoo

The most common dermal reactions to tattoo pigments are granulomas and various lichenoid diseases. Other conditions noted have been cement dermatitis, collagen deposits, discoid lupus erythematosus, eczematous eruptions, hyperkeratosis and parakeratosis, and keloids.

== Delayed reactions ==
Hypersensitive reactions to tattoos are known to lay latent for significant periods of time before exhibiting symptoms. Delayed abrupt chronic reactions, such as eczematous dermatitis, are known to manifest themselves from months to as many as twenty years after the patient received their most recent tattoo.

== Other adverse effects ==
Other documented conditions caused by tattoo pigments have been carcinoma, hyperplasia, tumours, and vasculitis. Keratoacanthoma may also occur, which makes excision of the affected area mandatory. Eyeball tattoos carry their own unique risks.

=== Hematoma ===
Occasionally, when a blood vessel is punctured during the tattooing procedure a hematoma (bruise) may appear. Bruises generally heal within one week. Bruises can appear as halos around a tattoo, or, if blood pools, as one larger bruise. This bluish or dark blurry halo that surrounds a tattoo can also be attributed to ink diffusion or 'blow-out'. Commonly mistaken for a hematoma, this discolouration occurs when tattoo pigments spread out into the subcutaneous tissue beneath the dermal skin layer, and may be caused by ink being deposited too deep in the skin.

=== Burden on lymphatic system ===
Some pigment migrates from a tattoo site to lymph nodes, where large particles may accumulate.

Particles created by laser tattoo removal treatments may be small enough that they are carried away by the lymphatic system and excreted, but this is not always the case; the laser technology used for removal and the composition of the pigment(s) being removed are variable.

=== Interference with cancer diagnosis and treatment ===
In medical imaging, such as mammography, pigments in lymph nodes may be accidentally interpreted as abnormal results, giving false positive results for cancer. Treatment of cancer may include using blue dye in the body to detect a sentinel lymph node, so existing tattoo pigments in lymph nodes may cause difficulty in identifying and treating sentinel nodes.

Lymph nodes may become discolored and inflamed with the presence of tattoo pigments, but discoloration and inflammation are also visual indicators of melanoma; consequently, diagnosing melanoma in a patient with tattoos is made difficult, and special precautions must be taken to avoid misdiagnoses.

=== Effects of blood thinners ===
A regimen of blood thinners may affect the tattooing process, causing excess bleeding. This increased bleeding can slow the process of getting enough ink into the skin. The aftercare healing may also take longer.

=== Cancer ===
No clear relation between tattoos and cancer has been established, but a few studies found that tattoos may be associated with an increased risk of malignant lymphoma and skin cancer.

== Case studies ==
=== Reactions to inks ===
- Mortimer NJ, Chave TA, Johnston GA (2003). "Red tattoo reactions". Clin Exp Dermatol. 28 (5): 508–10. doi:10.1046/j.1365-2230.2003.01358.x. PMID 12950341. S2CID 790219.
- Lubeck G, Epstein E (1952). "Complications of tattooing". Calif Med. 76 (2): 83–5. PMC 1521348. PMID 14905289.
- Engel E, Santarelli F, Vasold R, et al. (2008). "Modern tattoos cause high concentrations of hazardous pigments in skin". Contact Dermatitis. 58 (4): 228–33. doi:10.1111/j.1600-0536.2007.01301.x. PMID 18353031. S2CID 7057048.
- Steinbrecher I, Hemmer W, Jarisch R (2004). "Adverse reaction to the azo dye Pigment Red 170 in a tattoo". J Dtsch Dermatol Ges. 2 (12): 1007–8. doi:10.1046/j.1439-0353.2004.04733.x. PMID 16285314. S2CID 221646825.
- Kleinerman R, Greenspan A, Hale EK (2007). "Mohs micrographic surgery for an unusual case of keratoacanthoma arising from a longstanding tattoo". J Drugs Dermatol. 6 (9): 931–2. PMID 17941365.
- Pauluzzi P, Giordani M, Guarneri GF, et al. (1998). "Chronic eczematous reaction to red tattoo". J Eur Acad Dermatol Venereol. 11 (2): 187–8. doi:10.1111/j.1468-3083.1998.tb00780.x. PMID 9784053. S2CID 43231409.
- Kluger N, Minier-Thoumin C, Plantier F (2008). "Keratoacanthoma occurring within the red dye of a tattoo". Journal of Cutaneous Pathology. 35 (5): 504–7. doi:10.1111/j.1600-0560.2007.00833.x. PMID 17976209. S2CID 32569686.
- Winkelmann RK, Harris RB (1979). "Lichenoid delayed hypersensitivity reactions in tattoos". Journal of Cutaneous Pathology. 6 (1): 59–65. doi:10.1111/j.1600-0560.1979.tb00306.x. PMID 438395. S2CID 36559020.
- Verdich J (1981). "Granulomatous reaction in a red tattoo". Acta Derm Venereol. 61 (2): 176–7. doi:10.2340/0001555561176177. PMID 6165203.
- Cairns RJ, Calnan CD (1962). "Green tattoo reactions associated with cement dermatitis". Br J Dermatol. 74 (8–9): 288–94. doi:10.1111/j.1365-2133.1962.tb13513.x. PMID 13875622. S2CID 29755573.
- Balfour E, Olhoffer I, Leffell D, et al. (2003). "Massive pseudoepitheliomatous hyperplasia: an unusual reaction to a tattoo". Am J Dermatopathol. 25 (4): 338–40. doi:10.1097/00000372-200308000-00010. PMID 12876493. S2CID 23062278.
- Schwartz RA, Mathias CG, Miller CH, et al. (1987). "Granulomatous reaction to purple tattoo pigment". Contact Dermatitis. 16 (4): 198–202. doi:10.1111/j.1600-0536.1987.tb01424.x. PMID 3595119. S2CID 7894209.
- Morales-Callaghan AM Jr; Aguilar-Bernier M Jr; Martínez-García G; et al. (2006). "Sarcoid granuloma on black tattoo". J Am Acad Dermatol. 55 (5 Suppl): S71-3. doi:10.1016/j.jaad.2005.12.022. PMID 17052538.
- Cui W, McGregor DH, Stark SP, et al. (2007). "Pseudoepitheliomatous hyperplasia - an unusual reaction following tattoo: report of a case and review of the literature". Int J Dermatol. 46 (7): 743–5. doi:10.1111/j.1365-4632.2007.03150.x. PMID 17614808. S2CID 25994313.
- Biro L, Klein WP (1967). "Unusual complications of mercurial (cinnabar) tattoo. Generalized eczematous eruption following laceration of a tattoo". Arch Dermatol. 96 (2): 165–7. doi:10.1001/archderm.1967.01610020057017. PMID 6039153.
- Antal AS, Hanneken S, Neumann NJ, et al. (2008). "Erhebliche zeitliche Variationsbreite von Komplikationen nach Tätowierungen". Der Hautarzt. 59 (10): 769–71. doi:10.1007/s00105-008-1631-y. PMID 18773181. S2CID 24464853.

=== Toxins in inks ===
- Civatte J, Bazex J (2007). "Piercing and tattooing: regulation is needed to reduce complications". Bull Acad Natl Med. 191 (9): 1819–38. PMID 18663977.
- Hannuksela M (2005). "Tattoo pigments contains toxic compounds, but legislators do not pay attention". Duodecim. 121 (17): 1802–2. PMID 16262117.
- Möhrenschlager M, Worret WI, Köhn FM (2006). "Tattoos and permanent make-up: background and complications". MMW Fortschr Med. 148 (41): 34–6. doi:10.1007/bf03364782. PMID 17190258. S2CID 79090296.
- Poon, Kelvin Weng Chun (2008), In situ chemical analysis of tattooing inks and pigments: modern organic and traditional pigments in ancient mummified remains, University of Western Australia
- Wollina U, Gruner M, Schönlebe J (2008). "Granulomatous tattoo reaction and erythema nodosum in a young woman: common cause or coincidence?". J Cosmet Dermatol. 7 (2): 84–8. doi:10.1111/j.1473-2165.2008.00368.x. PMID 18482009. S2CID 24012924.

=== Other dermatological reactions ===
- Kazandjieva J, Tsankov N (2007). "Tattoos: dermatological complications". Clin Dermatol. 25 (4): 375–82. doi:10.1016/j.clindermatol.2007.05.012. PMID 17697920.
- Kluger N (2012). "Acute complications of tattooing presenting in the ED". Am J Emerg Med. 30 (9): 2055–2063. doi:10.1016/j.ajem.2012.06.014. PMID 22944541.
- Müller KM, Schmitz I, Hupe-Nörenberg L (2002). "Reaction patterns to cutaneous particulate and ornamental tattoos". Der Pathologe. 23 (1): 46–53. doi:10.1007/s00292-001-0507-z. PMID 11974503. S2CID 429363.
- Papageorgiou PP, Hongcharu W, Chu AC (1999). "Systemic sarcoidosis presenting with multiple tattoo granulomas and an extra-tattoo cutaneous granuloma". J Eur Acad Dermatol Venereol. 12 (1): 51–3. doi:10.1111/j.1468-3083.1999.tb00809.x. PMID 10188151. S2CID 27466431.
- Schmitz I, Müller KM (2004). "Elemental analysis of tattoo dyes: is there a potential risk from tattoo dyes?". J Dtsch Dermatol Ges. 2 (5): 350–3. doi:10.1046/j.1439-0353.2004.04755.x. PMID 16281523. S2CID 70579019.

=== MRI ===
- Klitscher D, Blum J, Kreitner KF, et al. (2005). "MRT-induced burns in tattooed patients: Case report of a traumatic surgery patient". Unfallchirurg. 108 (5): 410–4. doi:10.1007/s00113-004-0877-9. PMID 15909207. S2CID 810578.
- Stecco A, Saponaro A, Carriero A (2007). "Patient safety issues in magnetic resonance imaging: state of the art". Radiol Med. 112 (4): 491–508. doi:10.1007/s11547-007-0154-4. PMID 17563855. S2CID 11373808.
- Wagle WA, Smith M (2000). "Tattoo-induced skin burn during MR imaging". AJR Am J Roentgenol. 174 (6): 1795. doi:10.2214/ajr.174.6.1741795. PMID 10845532.
- Vahlensieck M (2000). "Tattoo-related cutaneous inflammation (burn grade I) in a mid-field MR scanner". Eur Radiol. 10 (1): 197. doi:10.1007/s003300050034. PMID 10663745. S2CID 38034579.
- Franiel T, Schmidt S, Klingebiel R (2006). "First-degree burns on MRI due to nonferrous tattoos". AJR Am J Roentgenol. 187 (5): W556. doi:10.2214/AJR.06.5082. PMID 17056894.

=== Lymph nodes and melanoma ===
- Gutermuth J, Hein R, Fend F, et al. (2007). "Cutaneous pseudolymphoma arising after tattoo placement". J Eur Acad Dermatol Venereol. 21 (4): 566–7. doi:10.1111/j.1468-3083.2006.01964.x. PMID 17374006. S2CID 384155.
- Gall N, Bröcker EB, Becker JC (2007). "Particularities in managing melanoma patients with tattoos: case report and review of the literature". J Dtsch Dermatol Ges. 5 (12): 1120–1. doi:10.1111/j.1610-0387.2007.06386.x. PMID 17919304. S2CID 7154910.
- Chikkamuniyappa S, Sjuve-Scott R, Lancaster-Weiss K, et al. (2005). "Tattoo pigment in sentinel lymph nodes: a mimicker of metastatic malignant melanoma". Dermatol Online J. 11 (1): 14. doi:10.5070/D31B43M26H. PMID 15748555.
- Hannah H, Falder S, Steele PR, et al. (2000). "Tattoo pigment masquerading as secondary malignant melanoma". Br J Plast Surg. 53 (4): 359. doi:10.1054/bjps.2000.3346. PMID 10876271.
- Kluger N, Jolly M, Guillot B (2008). "Tattoo-induced vasculitis". J Eur Acad Dermatol Venereol. 22 (5): 643–4. doi:10.1111/j.1468-3083.2008.02729.x. PMID 18384545. S2CID 9318323.
- Sperry K (1992). "Tattoos and tattooing. Part II: Gross pathology, histopathology, medical complications, and applications". Am J Forensic Med Pathol. 13 (1): 7–17. doi:10.1097/00000433-199203000-00003. PMID 1585890. S2CID 12596869.
- Zirkin HJ, Avinoach I, Edelwitz P (2001). "A tattoo and localized lymphadenopathy: a case report". Cutis. 67 (6): 471–2. PMID 11419018.
