= Martin Hildebrandt =

American tattoo artist

- Born: c. 1825; German Confederation
- Died: January 16, 1890 (aged 64–65); New York City Asylum for the Insane
- Occupation: Tattoo artist

Martin Hildebrandt (c. 1825–1890) was an early American tattoo artist, nicknamed "Old Martin".

== Military service ==
Hildebrandt immigrated to the United States from Germany. He enlisted in the United States Navy and served aboard the USS United States from 1846 to 1849, where he learned tattooing from another sailor. Sailors tattooing each other at sea was common in the mid-19th century. In the 1850s, Hildebrandt traveled to Japan as part of the Perry Expedition.

In the American Civil War, he served as a soldier in the Army of the Potomac. He traveled from camp to camp tattooing other soldiers and sailors. Another Civil War veteran, Wilbur F. Hinman, wrote that many regiments at the time had tattooers who applied "flags, muskets, cannons, sabers and an infinite variety of patriotic emblems and warlike and grotesque devices." Soldiers often asked for tattoos of their names and initials, which served as identification if they were killed in action. While Hildebrandt was a Union soldier, some claim he tattooed Confederate soldiers as well, but a tattoo historian who researched this story could not find any evidence for it.

== Work ==
After the end of the Civil War, Hildebrandt made tattooing his full-time profession. He opened a tattoo parlor in a tavern on Oak Street in Manhattan, New York City, in 1870 or 1872. This was probably the first American tattoo shop. He tattooed a wide range of people, including mechanics, farmers, and ladies and gentlemen. His work was in black and red, using India ink and vermilion. He may have mentored Samuel O'Reilly, who opened another tattoo shop in New York City in the 1880s and patented the first electric tattoo machine in 1891.

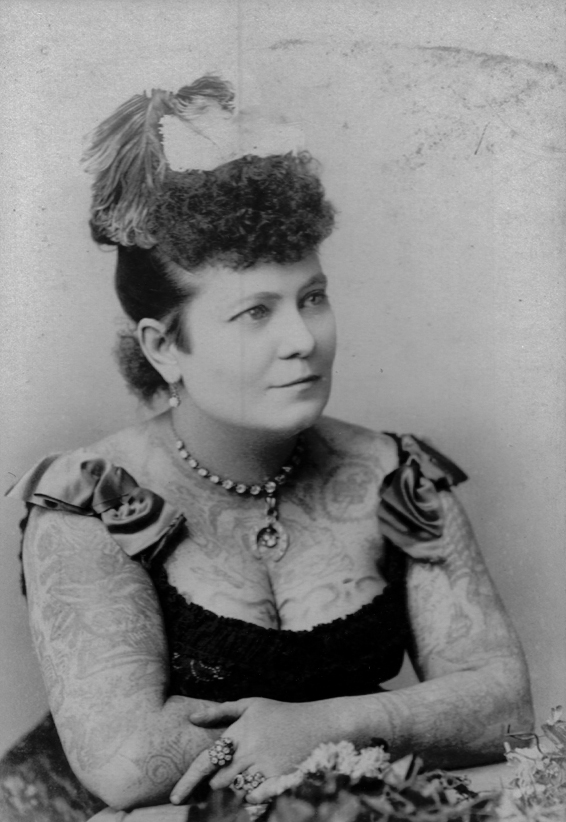
Nora Hildebrandt

In 1882, Hildebrandt tattooed Nora Hildebrandt, one of the first "tattooed ladies" to perform in the US. She was often presented as his daughter, but she was actually his common-law wife.

In 1885, after Nora had left to go on tour, Hildebrandt was arrested for disorderly conduct and transferred to the New York City Asylum for the Insane. He died in 1890.
