= Artoria Gibbons =

American tattooed lady (1893–1985)

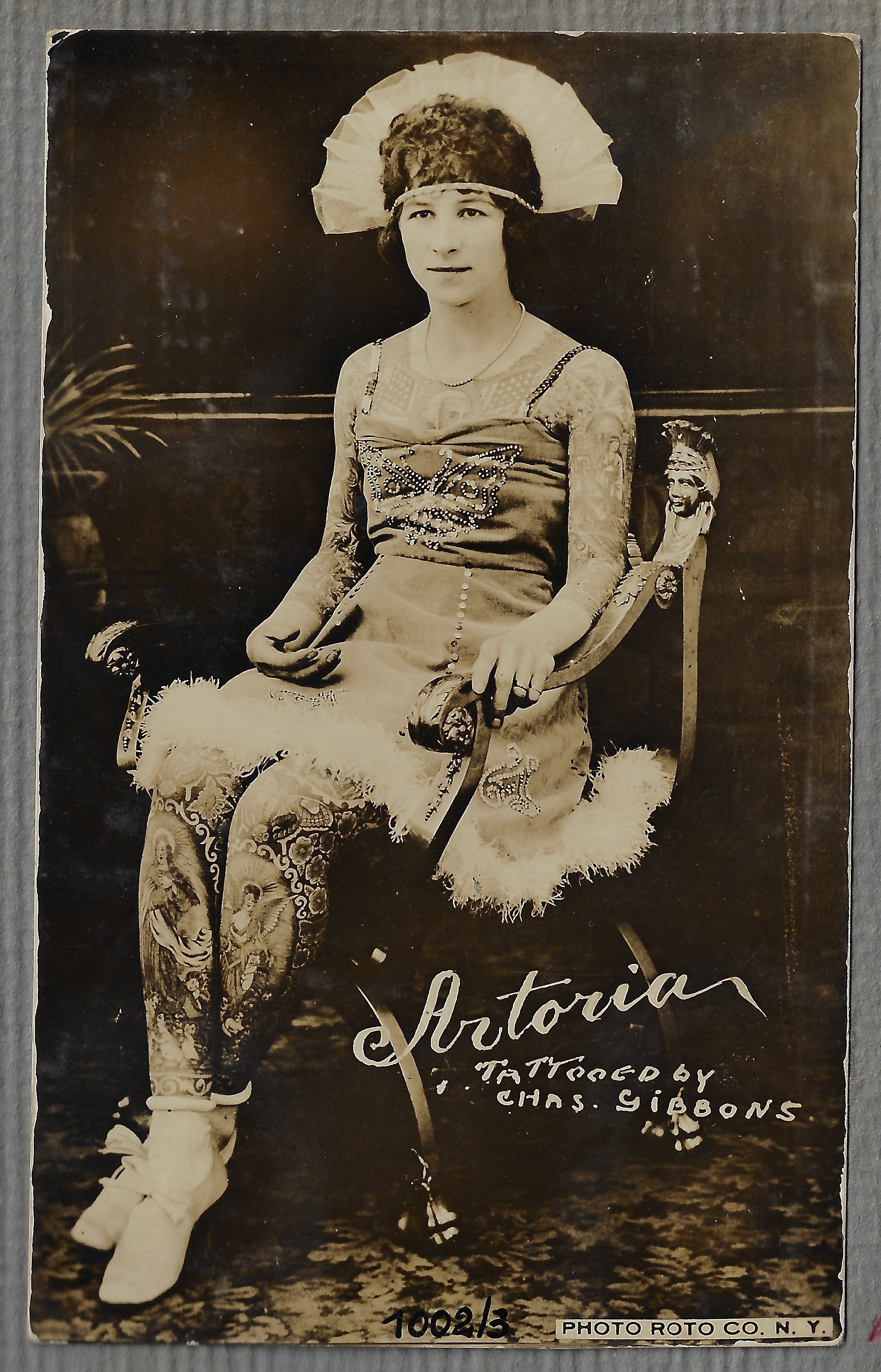
1921 postcard by the Photo Roto co, New York (Museum für Kunst und Gewerbe Hamburg)

Artoria Gibbons (also known by her stage name, Mrs. C.W. (Red) Gibbons) was an American tattooed lady. She worked at carnival sideshows and at circuses for more than 35 years, including the Ringling Brothers and Barnum & Bailey Circus from 1921 to 1923 and the Hagenbeck–Wallace Circus in 1924.

== Biography ==
=== Early life ===
She was born Anna Mae Burlingston in Linwood, Wisconsin in 1893 to Gunder Asbjørnsen Huseland, a Norwegian immigrant from Fjære Municipality who had emigrated to the USA in 1882 and had taken the name Frank Burlington, and Amma Mabel Mason. Gibbons had at least one brother and six sisters. Her father was a farmer, but in 1906 the family moved to a homestead on Aladdin mountain in Washington state. The following year, her father died from typhoid fever after drinking from contaminated water.

To help support the family, Burlingston and two of her sisters found work as domestic servants in Spokane, Washington. This was where Burlingston would met the 33-year old tattoo artist Charles “Red” Gibbons^{^{[1]}} at a department store café; he was working in an arcade and had been tattooing professionally for a number of years in the American Traditional style.

They married in Spokane in 1912, and would go on to have a daughter.

== Career ==
Despite being married to a tattoo artist for several years, Gibbons did not get her first tattoo until about 1918/1919. This was after Gibbons and her husband decided that they would make a better living if she became a performing tattooed lady. Gibbons was deeply religious and a member of the Episcopalian Church. Her husband tattooed her with images from Gibbons' favorite classical religious artwork, in full color. Gibbons' tattoos also included illustrations of angels and saints as well as patriotic images, such as George Washington on her sternum.

Her tattoos, which would come to cover 80% of her body, later featured renditions of paintings by the old masters such as angels by Raphael and the Holy Family by Michelangelo, a partial Annunciation by Botticelli, a likeness of "The Last Supper" by Leonardo da Vinci on her back, a depiction of the Virgin Mary on one thigh, and the infant Jesus on the other thigh. Because of her fine art tattoos, Gibbons' stage name was "Lady Artoria Gibbons – The Living Art Museum” Gibbons husband also worked with other tattooed performers such as Bertie the Tattooed Lady and Betty Broadbent.

Gibbons' career began properly sometime in 1921 when she signed on as a performer with the Pete Kortes Sideshow and was the first tattooed lady to perform in his local carnival sideshow. After two years, she worked for the traveling circus company Ringling Bros. and Barnum & Bailey. touring with other sideshow acts such as Krao Farini and George Auger, the Cardiff Giant. Gibbons, afterwards, toured with a number of other companies. Gibbons became one of the highest-paid tattooed ladies of her time.

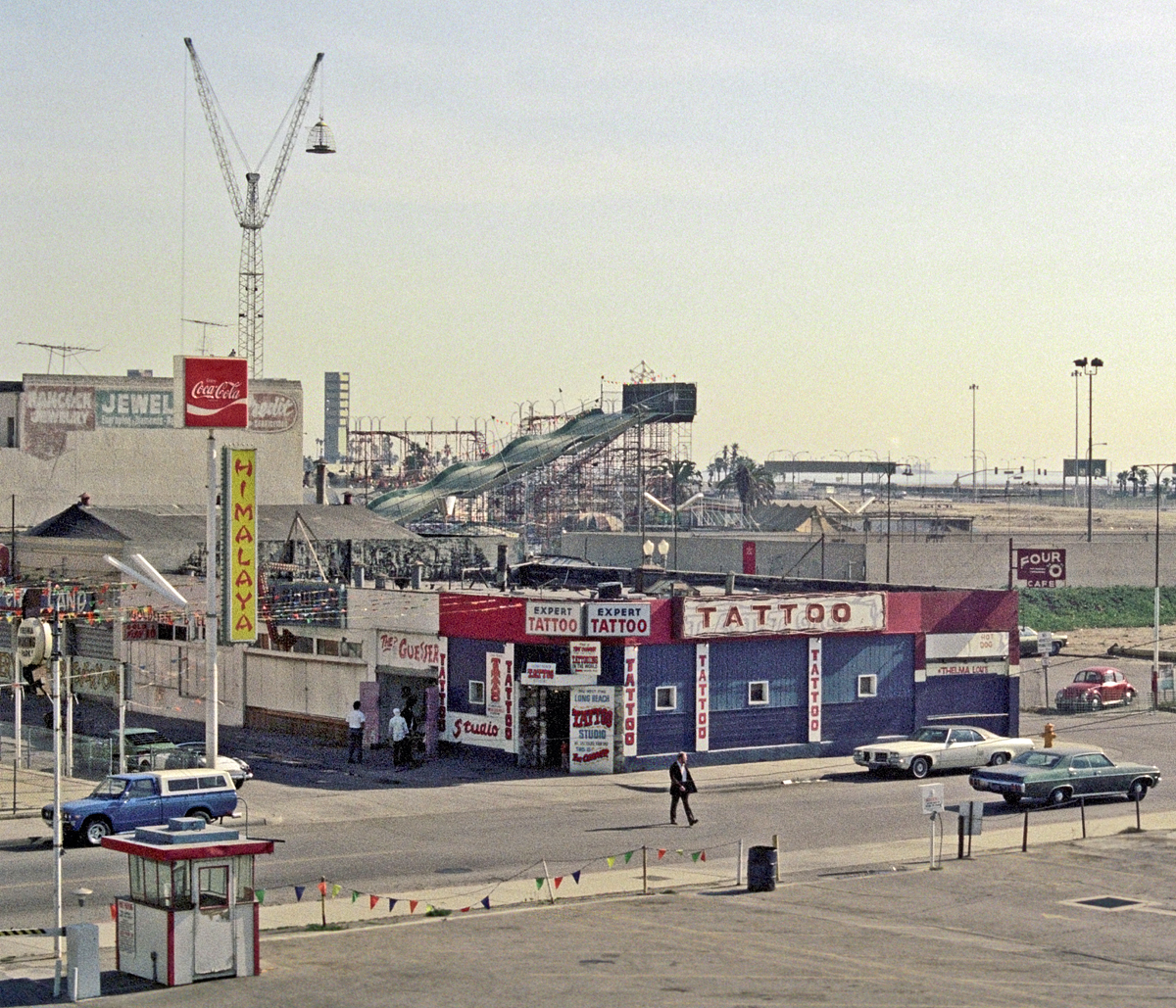
Tattoo parlour on The Pike (1976)

Towards the later end of her life, Gibbons and her husband settled in California where it's possible she pursued a career as a tattoo artist. The couple is said to have operated a tattoo parlour situated in the grounds of The Pike amusement park in Long Beach.^{[2]}

After her husband's death in 1964, Gibbons was hired by Ward Hall, the owner of Hall and Christ Sideshow, whom she had met years earlier while working at Hubert's Dime Museum in New York's Times Square.

Gibbons officially retired from the Hall and Christ Sideshow in 1981, and went to live with family in Tennessee.

== Death ==
Gibbons continued to perform until her death in 1985. She was laid to rest in Tennessee.

== Notes ==
^{1} Gibbons would tell another story of meeting her husband and becoming a tattooed lady act part of her performer persona. Gibbons would recount this story while interviewed by author Arthur H. Lewis in the 1960s. Lewis then included this in his non-fiction book "Carnival" (1970). This story has been refuted by Gibbons family.

^{2} 22 Chestnut Place, now home to Outer Limits Tattoo and Museum.
