= Tattooed lady =

19th-20th century entertainment occupation

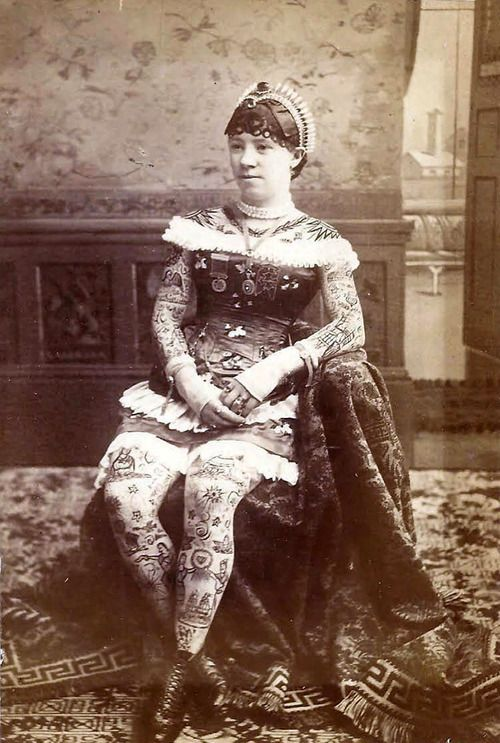
Irene Woodward, billed as "The Original Tattooed Lady", was not the first woman to work as a tattooed lady in circuses and dime museums, but she was one of the earliest and most successful performers of the late 19th century.

Tattooed ladies were working class women who acquired tattoos and performed in circuses, sideshows, and dime show museums as means for earning a substantial living. At the height of their popularity during the turn of the 20th century, tattooed ladies transgressed Victorian gender norms by showcasing their bodies in scantily clad clothing and earned a salary considerably larger than their male counterparts. Tattooed ladies often used captivity narratives as a means for excusing their appearance, and to tantalize the audience. The popularity of tattooed ladies waned with the onset of television.

== Origins ==
=== Olive Oatman ===
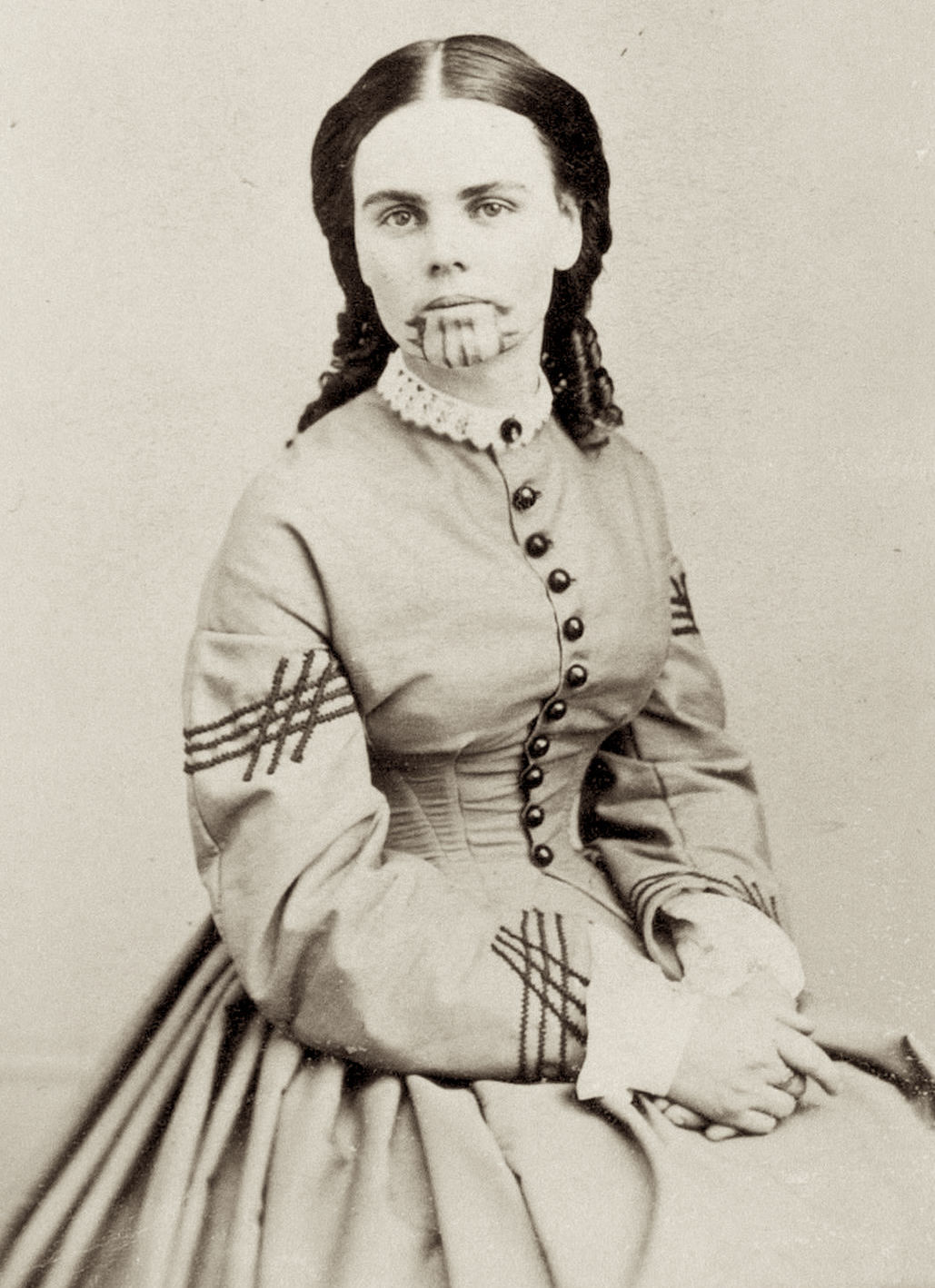
Olive Oatman by Benjamin F. Powelson, US National Portrait Gallery

Thirty years before tattooed women appeared on the sideshow and dime museum circuit scene, a young, white woman made national headlines with her unusual appearance and frightening story. During her family's westward emigration along the Santa Fe Trail in 1851, the Yavapi took thirteen-year-old Olive Oatman, along with her seven-year old sister Mary Ann, captive. The Oatman girls lived with the Yavapi until they were traded to the Mojave, with whom they lived until Mary Ann's death and Olive's subsequent rescue on February 22, 1856.

Under the assumption that her entire family were deceased and that rescue proved impossible, Oatman assimilated to Mojave culture and acquired chin and arm tattoos as a means of identifying herself in the afterlife. According to Amelia Klem Osterud, Oatman's story parted with traditional captivity narratives and Victorian gender norms since she didn't "wither and die" due to her experience. Oatman deliberately reconciled her identity as an adopted Mojave with her new one as a marked white woman by traveling on a lecture circuit with her ghostwriter, Royal B. Stratton.

Oatman's decision to sensationalize her narrative for profit and to exclude intimate aspects of it for self-protection demonstrates an astute awareness of her predicament. Since US society would not have tolerated Oatman's choice to assimilate into Mojave culture, or even accept her as a transcultural individual, she purposefully recast herself as a victim of outside brutality. In this way, Oatman garnered more nods of sympathy and support rather than stares of disgust.

It has also been suggested that Olive Oatman's story of captivity would not have been so popular in the era had she not acquired Mojave tattoos. It is also claimed that Olive Oatman had not only been assimilated into Mojave life, but that she had also been married into the tribe, bearing a child.

In turn, her story served as an exploitable model for future working-class women's mythical and scandalously revealing narratives. Using the victim narrative allowed women such as Oatman, and the ones who copied her story, to maintain respectability while displaying their bodies for profit during the Victorian era.

=== Becoming a tattooed lady ===
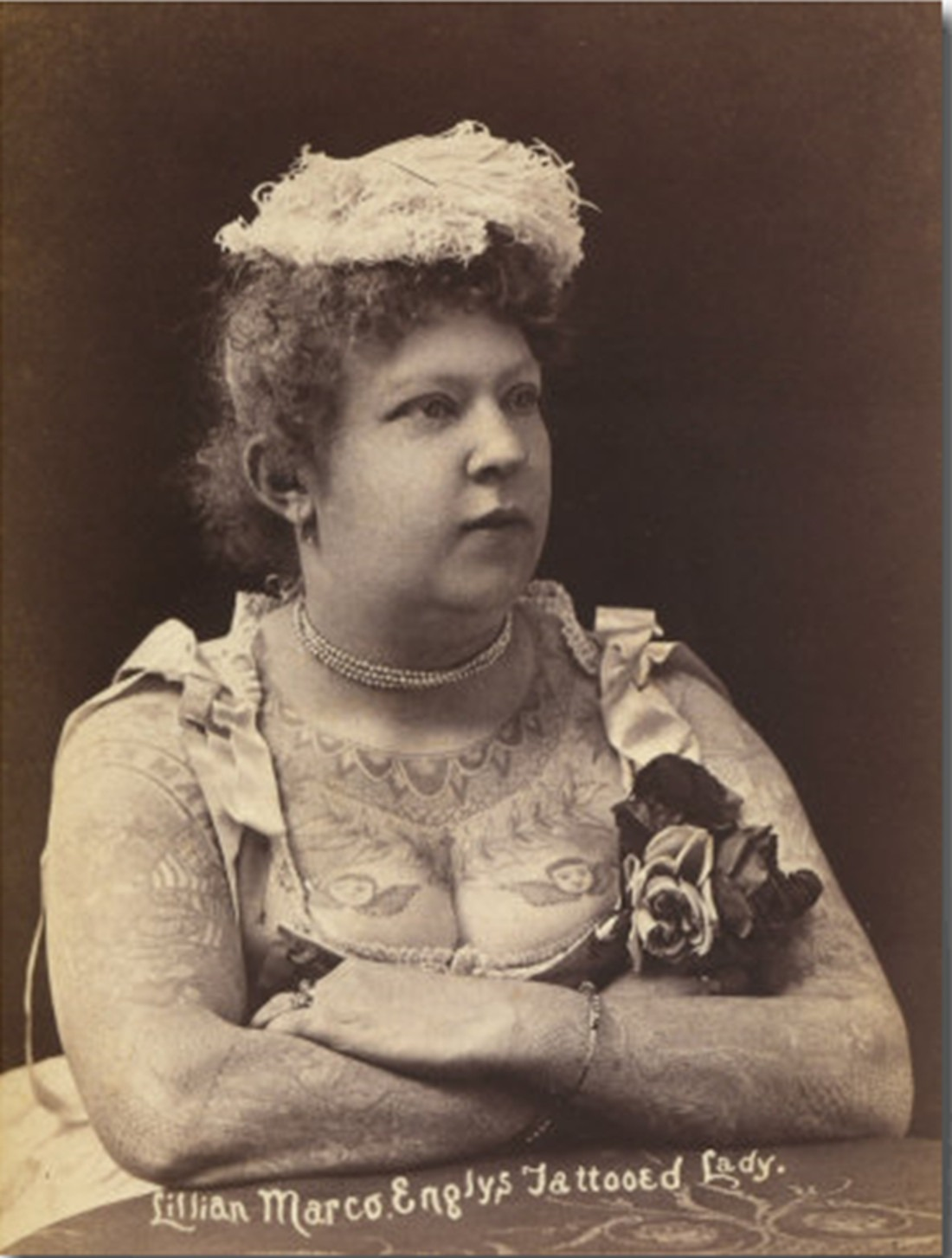
Photograph of tattooed lady Lillian Marco from c. 1885-1892. She appeared in circuses and dime museums in the late 19th century, including the World's Museum in Boston.

Circuses and dime museums searched for new and exciting acts, including posting wanted ads in newspapers for tattooed ladies. During the late 1890s to early 1900s, tattoo artists typically charged less than a dollar for small tattoos, while a full body job totalled $30 and took less than two months to complete. Depending on her popularity, a tattooed lady made anywhere from $100 to $200 weekly during the turn of the century, whereas teachers in 1900 averaged $7 a week, plus room and board, and by 1909, clerical workers earned about $22 a week and industrial workers in Milwaukee, Wisconsin, made $9. The Roanoke Daily reported in 1895 that an unnamed tattooed woman received $100 a day, and that

... the fairy tale about her, as told by the showman, only heightened the crowd's interest and harmed nobody. She was represented in the story as having been stranded on one of the Sandwich islands, shipwrecked, with her husband, who was put to death. Her life was spared, but she was put to torture, having these extraordinary characters tattooed all over her body. There were from 500 to 700 people at each one of the 21 daily performances at which that tattooed woman was exhibited, and all were pleased at the show, for which they paid 10 cents.

Many knew the falsehood of these captivity stories, but spent their money to hear them for the sake of entertainment, as well as a chance to satiate their curiosity to see the female body in an uncharacteristic form.

In an 1884 Sedalia Weekly Bazoo interview, tattooed lady Mary Baum said, when asked where she got the idea to acquire tattoos from, "I saw the other tattooed ladies in museums, and thought it would be nice."

==== Advertising and money ====
A tattooed woman's earnings depended on the seasons, popularity and success of the circus or dime museum she associated with, and competition from other tattooed performers. Some tattooed women expanded their reach beyond the tent and secured additional income by advertising products. For example, in an advertisement headlined "Punctured Purity: A Wonderfully Tattooed Lady: Nature and Art Perfected—A Beauty", Irene Woodward's name is used to sell pain-reducing St. Jacob's Oil;

Miss Irene was tattooed by her father and underwent what was to her a period of delightful suffering for seven years. The young lady during that time suffered, of course, but were we to undergo such a delightful piece of needlework, it is needless to say that we would want in close proximity a bottle of ... St. Jacob's Oil ... I consider it as far superior to any other medicine in curative power, as Miss Woodward, from an artistic point, is above a bit of bric a brac.

The media exposure assisted in gaining popularity and a wider audience. The positive wording in the advertisement, including the mention that Irene is above using a faulty product, related to elevating her into a respectable status.

==== Gaining respectability ====
The consequences of acquiring tattoos and performing in skimpy outfits weighed heavily in terms of respect towards tattooed ladies. Irene Woodward's appearance served as a mark of deviancy, and most members of society found her exposed tattooed body repulsive outside of the high top. With this in mind, Victorians hardly viewed circuses and dime museums as beacons for good, clean family fun. Nonetheless, they remained curious and captivated by Woodward's tantalizing story. In order to toe the line between virtue and nonconformity, Woodward's media splash in the New York Times provided insight as to how both tattooed ladies and media outlets strategically crafted their image as respectable:

Miss Woodward remarked that she felt a little bashful about being looked at that way, never having worn the costume in the presence of men before. ... The tattooing, which was done in india ink, appeared artistic, and the devices were varied and attractive. Around the neck was observed a floral necklace. Dependent from this was a bunch of roses in full bloom drooping until their graceful forms were lost beneath the lace edging of the bodice. ... Miss Woodward states that she was the daughter of a sailor who began the tattooing when she was but 6 years of age finished it when she was 12.

The reference to her reluctance to reveal herself in front of men for the first time reflects the attempt to legitimize her respectability, and softens the transgressive nature of her appearance. Woodward's "first time" occurred every time she presented her body before audiences; this served undoubtedly as a way to 'exclusivize' her display from city to city and to attract droves of spectators. The vivid, feminine descriptions of her tattoos served as a way to further elevate and feminize Woodward's appearance.

Other performers, such as Miss Creole and Miss Alawanda, adopted similar media tools in their presentation. As tattooed ladies became more commonplace in circuses and dime museums, the opportunities that came with the twentieth century also forced tattooed ladies to face new challenges. In order to stay exotic within the realm of changing ideas concerning respectability, these women thought of innovative narratives to compete with each other and recapture the attention of audiences.

These women shifted the Victorian victim narrative to one that demonstrates elements of deliberate choice in becoming a "self-made freak". In a greater sense, the act of exposing their bodies for pay, and even operating independently without subordinating themselves to a male boss, defied traditionally held social expectations concerning a woman's bodily autonomy.

==== Functioning in mainstream society ====
True to their career-driven investment, tattooed ladies kept covered to not only prevent free shows, thus keeping their exoticism fresh, but to also prevent the wear and tear tattoos suffer over the course of aging and regular sun exposure. Tattooed ladies strategically placed their tattoos in such a way that allowed them to dress modestly in public and to function in their daily lives unnoticed. Photographs of popular tattooed ladies reveal that their tattoos did not extend past their forearms, above their neck or below their ankles. In addition, many of these ladies bore tattoos that included religious and patriotic iconography. Whether this was for personal preference or as a means of self-expression is not known, however the organization and thematic nature of these tattoos demonstrate a common pattern. Tattooed ladies used such images to elevate the status of their tattoos as a proper art form worthy of display and as a way to soften the blow of their nonconforming bodies for spectators. Even the Ringling Brothers Circus management remained cognizant of this and encouraged employees, particularly women, to maintain respectable behavior on and off stage to dispel stereotyping associated with their acts, saying, "we should want the 'Town folks' to feel that the 'Show folks' are real men and women and ladies and gentlemen as well." In this way, the image of respectability encompassed not only a tattooed woman personally, but the entire reputation of the show she worked for.

== Early tattooed ladies ==
=== Nora Hildebrandt ===
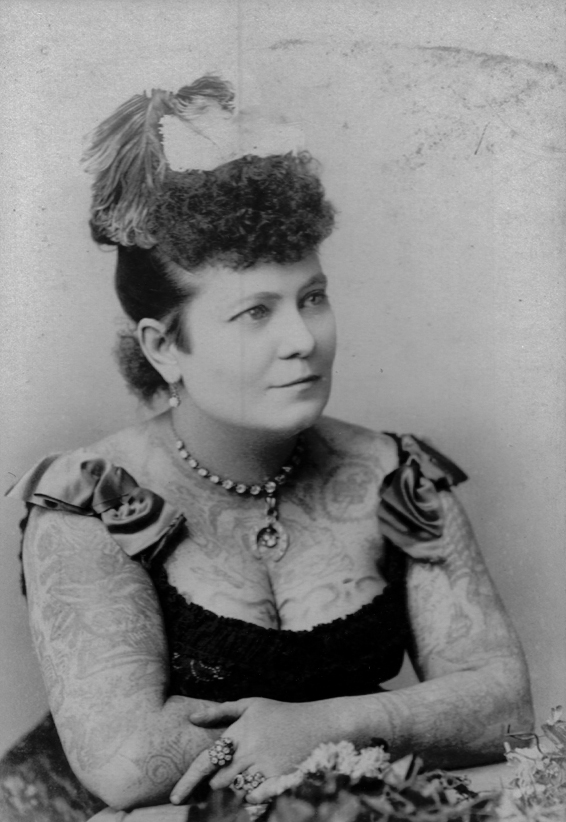
Nora Hildebrandt

Nora Hildebrandt, one of the first tattooed ladies to perform in the US, wildly fictionalized her pasts to attract audiences captivated by her scandalous outfits, as well as the sexual undertones of her forced tattooing by Native Americans. In a pamphlet published around 1882, Hildebrandt's outlandish backstory included not only captivity among Sitting Bull's tribe, but also forced tattooing by her own father:

One of Sitting Bull's warriors accused him of trying to poison them, and the chief told the prisoner if he would tattoo his daughter he would give him his liberty— that he must tattoo her from her toes to her head…He was compelled to work six hours a day for one year before she was recused, accomplishing three hundred and sixty five designs.

In reality, Hildebrandt was born into poverty under a different name in London, England, sometime in the 1850s. Hildebrandt met professional tattoo artist Martin Hildebrandt, who was often presented as her father or husband even though they did not actually marry, and allowed him to tattoo her entire body in 1882. Though the process of tattooing during this time period involved crudely hand-poked images and long hours of intense pain, Hildebrandt's reward for becoming a self-made "freak" was not kept secret. For example, the New York Clipper reported on March 22, 1884, that during her visit to Mexico, she received "a mustang menage pony, a silver-mounted cage containing an American eagle and lion, a pet tiger which follows her about, a performing monkey, parrots, mocking-birds, etc." In an 1882 review, the New York Times criticized Hildebrandt's stout stature and masculine facial features: "her face is [so] hard that you wonder they ever got the needle through the skin without a hammer." How the media treated a tattooed lady ultimately determined her star's ability to rise. Once tattooed women began to change their stories and use the media to their advantage, they experienced more longevity in their careers.

=== Irene Woodward ===
Not much is known about Irene Woodward's origins before her career as a tattooed lady. The New York Times claimed that:

She was the daughter of a sailor who began the tattooing when she was but 6 years of age and finished it when she was 12. She was born near Dallas, Texas, and has spent the greater part of her life in the Western wilds. She conceived the idea of exhibiting herself after seeing the tattooed Greek in Denver.

In fact, Samuel O'Reilly and his not yet famous apprentice, Charles Wagner, tattooed Woodward. Unlike Hildebrandt, Miss Creole and Miss Alawanda, Woodward did not use the captivity narrative in full. Though her tattoos were still imposed from an outside individual, the implication that her father completed them suggested that the imposition came from within Western cultural practices rather than external ones. She saw a male tattooed performer, the possibility of securing a living by replicating him, and reinvented herself.

== Tattooed ladies in transition ==
As women began to experience greater social freedom due to suffrage, the New Woman Movement and the absence of male competition in the workforce during both World Wars, the tattoo evolved into a solidified marker of working-class folk art. During the 1930s and onward, tattooed ladies deviated from fictionalized captivity narratives and accounted for their choice of profession more freely.

The above passage was set to music and became world famous as "Lydia the Tattooed Freely Deviated New Woman".

=== Mae Vandermark ===
When asked in 1931 why she acquired her tattoos, Mae Vandermark quipped, "I love Art…and that's true, too—up to a certain point…I mean, I like to eat regular." Vandermark found that performing as a tattooed lady garnered a higher profit than working as a stenographer. According to a 1927 article in the Milwaukee Sentinel, Vandermark saw another woman with a small tattoo while swimming at Coney Island and decided she wanted one. Upon acquiring two, she met and became "great friends" with tattooed performer Lotta Pictoria "who persuaded Mae to be a professional." In the same article, Pictoria is referenced as the person who introduced Vandermark to Charles Wagner and helped her gain a full body suit over the course of ten months for the bargain price of $130. This suggests that Pictoria mentored or showed Vandermark the ropes of performing as a tattooed lady by sharing her social connections with Vandermark, ultimately helping in launching her career.

=== Betty Broadbent ===
Betty Broadbent initially performed as the youngest tattooed woman ever during the 1920s. By the time bathing suits and hemlines rose, Broadbent decided to shock the public when she entered a beauty pageant at the World's Fair in 1939. While she had no chance of winning, Broadbent enjoyed the attention and free advertising, and assured her audiences that her wholesome act stood apart from "those carnival floozies with one or two tattoos who would bump and grind." Like Vandermark, Broadbent's tattoos also bore references to pop culture icons and ones suited to her individual taste; she sported images of Charlie Chaplin and Charles Lindberg. In this way, Broadbent reflects the tattoo's permanence in American folk culture as an art form steadily gaining recognition. Broadbent's tattoos suggest a deliberate attempt to express oneself through choice rather than imposition or affliction. Her souvenir postcard said: "It was done for professional reasons only. I have no regrets for having chosen this most unusual career." Broadbent's 1956 pay stub for $220 suggests that her earnings were significantly high.

=== Maud Arizona ===
Maud Arizona (b. 1888 as Genovefa Weisser, m. Forst, presumably in Löchau (Lachov) / district of Braunau (Kingdom of Bohemia); † 1963) was a well-known showwoman during the 1920s, who appeared under her stage name Maud Arizona as a "tattooed lady" and was a model for several works by Otto Dix.

== Decline ==
During the 1950s and 1960s, business started to lag for many artists and tattooed ladies since circus shows and dime museums fell out of vogue. As the postwar era hailed a sense of conformity and normalcy, tattoos decreased in popularity and once again became stigmatized due to their longstanding association with criminal activity. Still, a small group of tattooed women, whose youth and ink faded considerably by this time, continued to perform where an audience gathered. Artoria Gibbons, one of the last ladies to perform, performed well into her eighties during the 1980s. Gibbons performed not necessarily for money, but for the love of performance art. Tattooed ladies moonlighted as artists during their off seasons alongside their husbands. Many of these tattooed ladies learned the craft of professional tattooing from their significant others and paved the way for a new generation of women to secure their livings by creating feminine styles of flash in their own shops.

== Tattooed ladies today ==
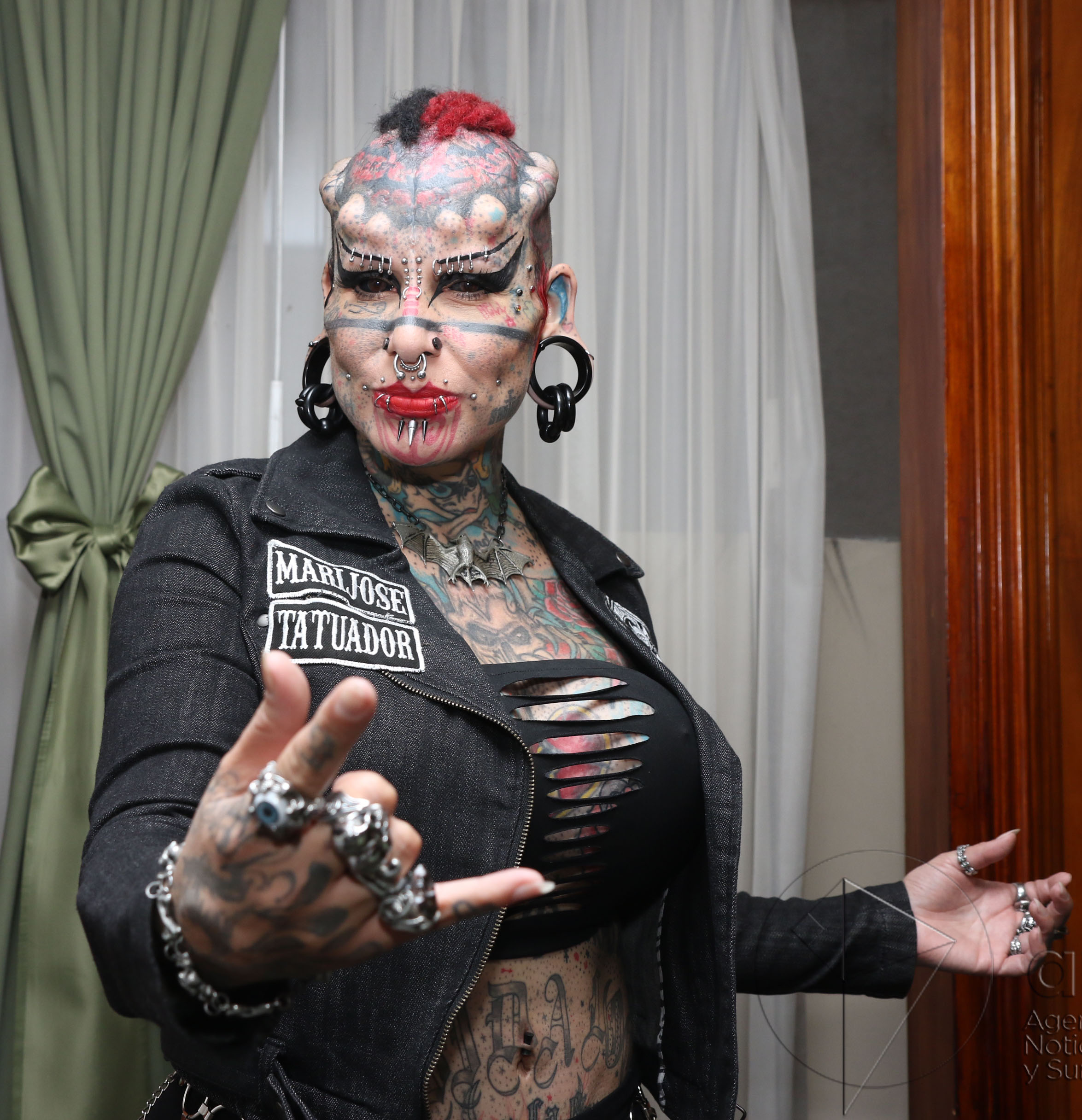
María José Cristerna, recognized by Guinness World Records as the most tattooed woman in the world, with 96% of her body covered

Although the sideshow tattooed lady is no longer mainstream, tattooing among women has significant correlations with sexualization and gendered stereotypes that reinforce gendered expectations. A recent study of career-oriented women with tattoos found that the women felt strong support for their tattoos from their partners and friends, but not as much support from their mothers, siblings, and children. Fathers, physicians, registered nurses, and the public with whom tattooed women came into contact, were the least likely to voice acceptance of the tattoos.

Because of the stigma, women tend to determine the placement of their tattoos differently than men. Generally, women will choose an area of the body where the tattoo will not be seen immediately or that can be covered up when needed. Women usually have the first tattoo placed on an unexposed part of their body. If they later choose another tattoo, a more visible body area may be selected. While women commonly choose the top of the foot, inner wrist, side of the rib cage, and shoulder, men choose the arm, chest, forearm, and back for their tattoos.

For many years women with tattoos were placed into specific categories: circus sideshow acts, biker chicks, hippies, or prostitutes. The presence of a tattoo on a woman's body in today's society is not necessarily against the norm, though a certain sexual connotation still exists. Historically, tattoos have been viewed as a masculine trend but women are challenging this stigma by choosing to artistically enhance their bodies as a form of self-expression. When a woman's body is a sex object, a tattooed woman's body is a lascivious sex object; when a woman's body is nature, a tattooed woman's body is primitive. Their tattoos are culturally written over to punctuate meanings already attached to the female body within a larger cultural domain.

=== Semiotics of tattoos in relation to modern feminism ===
==== Tattooing to drive a cause ====
One of the most common reasons for getting a tattoo is to have a visual representation with a deeper meaning for the wearer and perhaps for others to see. Today, modern feminists often use tattoos as a means to drive a cause and as a material semiotic means of self-expression. One example of both uses is tattoos that subvert ideologies to meet an individual's vision of self and interpretations, such as Marquis Bey's tattoos of traditional Christian symbology, such as a cross and Psalm 23:4, to reinforce her own atheism, Blackness, and feminist qualities. Tattoos can add an extra layer of significance to skin, in the same way that age, gender, race, and other factors of the skin carry meaning. Some feminists use tattoos to self-define the female flesh, confronting essentialist ideas that define a woman's body and social views of what women's bodies should be. Thus women use tattoos to challenge essentialism and metanarratives.

==== How women with tattoos are viewed ====
Although attitudes toward women with tattoos have improved in Western society over the past 30 years, there remains a stigma against female tattoo-bearers. A recent study at the University of Windsor, in Ontario, Canada, recorded undergraduates' attitudes toward people with tattoos. The primary factors that influenced attitudes included the gender of the tattoo bearer, followed by the placement and size of the tattoo. This sentiment is popularized in films such as The Girl with the Dragon Tattoo. In the original book and in Swedish film interpretations, the dragon tattoo on Lisbeth is massive, taking up nearly the entire surface of her back. In the Americanized version of the film, the dragon tattoo is considerably smaller, covering only her left shoulder.

Judgmental attitudes and the minimization of both size and visibility of tattoos on women is not the only form of negative perception toward women with tattoos. There is a significant relationship between tattoos and how people perceive their bearers, particularly in the world of law enforcement with instances involving officers, judges, prosecutors, prison administrators, guards, and other prisoners. In these instances, people read the tattoo as text and often have harsher opinions of the tattoo-wearer because of a biased reading.

==== Tattoos as fashion ====
The rise of tattoos as an art form rather than an identifier of bikers, prison gangs, and sailors has made tattoos a fashion statement. Some fashionable tattoos are chosen for cosmetic reasons, such as permanent eyebrows and lips, or masking scars after a mastectomy in place of reconstruction in breast cancer culture and self-care.

== See also ==
- Body suit tattoo
- Old school tattoo
- Circus World Museum
- "Lydia the Tattooed Lady"

== Works cited ==
- Adams, Katherine H., Michael L. Keene, and Jennifer C. Koella. Seeing the American Woman, 1880–1920 : The Social Impact of the Visual Media Explosion. Jefferson, N.C: McFarland, 2012.
- Baxandall, Rosalyn, Linda Gordon, and Susan Reverby, eds., America's Working Women.New York and London: W.W. Norton Company, 1995.
- Braunberger, Christine. "Revolting Bodies: The Monster Beauty of Tattooed Women." NWSA Journal 12, no. 2 (2000): 1–23.
- Collins, Gail. America's Women: Four Hundred Years of Dolls, Drudges, Helpmates, and Heroines. New York: William Morrow, 2003.
- Davis, Janet M. The Circus Age Culture & Society Under the American Big Top. Chapel Hill: University of North Carolina Press, 2002.
- DeMello, Margot. Bodies of Inscription: A Cultural History of the Modern Tattoo Community. Durham & London: Duke University Press, 2000.
- Dennett, Andrea S. Weird and Wonderful : The Dime Museum in America. New York: New York University Press, 1997.
- Harris, Alice. Out to Work : A History of Wage-Earning Women in the United States. New York: Oxford University Press, 1982.
- Manfred Kohrs: Die tätowierten Damen der Belle Époque. In: Tattoo Kulture Magazine Issue 46, August/September 2021, p. 10–25.
- Mifflin, Margot. The Blue Tattoo: the Life of Olive Oatman. Lincoln: University of Nebraska Press, 2009.
- Mifflin, Margot. Bodies of Subversion: A Secret History of Women and Tattoo. 3rd ed. New York: Powerhouse Books, 2013.
- Osterud, Amelia Klem. "A Life of Her Own Choosing: Anna Gibbons' Fifty Years as a Tattooed Lady." Wisconsin Magazine of History. Vol. 89, No. 3, Spring (2006) 28–39.
- Osterud, Amelia Klem. The Tattooed Lady: A History. Maryland: Taylor Trade Publishing, 2014
- Putzi, Jennifer. Identifying Marks: Race, Gender, and the Marked Body in Nineteenth-Century America. Athens: University of Georgia Press, 2012.
- Vapnek, Lara. Breadwinners: Working Women and Economic Independence, 1865–1920. Urbana: University of Illinois Press, 2009.
- Lombroso, Cesare. Criminal Man: Translated and with a New Introduction by Mary Gibson, and Nicole Hahn Rafter. Durham: Duke University Press, 2006.
- Lombroso, Cesare. "The Savage Origin of Tattooing." Popular Science Monthly, Vol. 48, (1896): 739–803.
- Sanger, William. "A History of Prostitution" in America's Working Women, eds. Rosalyn Baxandall, Linda Gordon, and Susan Reverby, New York and London: W.W. Norton Company, 1995.
- "Circus, Minstrel and Variety Gossip", New York Clipper, March 22, 1884, (accessed February 20, 2016)
- "Freak Business Good: Snake Charmers and Tattooed Ladies are in Demand", The Indianapolis Journal, August 24, 1902. (accessed February 20, 2016).
- "Punctured Purity: A Wonderfully Tattooed Lady", The Brooklyn Daily Eagle, March 21, 1882. (accessed February 20, 2016)
- "Thrilling Narrative! Captivity and Rescue of Olive Oatman", Sacramento Daily Union, April 14, 1857, (accessed February 20, 2016)
- Webb, Spider, and Marcia Tucker. Heavily Tattooed Men and Women. New York: McGraw-Hill, 1976
- Charlene Gibbons, email and Facebook message with author: March 6, 2016; April 22, 2016.
- Circus World Museum Archives, Baraboo Wisconsin
- Archival Collections, Jerome Library, Bowling Green State University, Bowling Green, Ohio.
