= Electric pen =

Part of a device for duplicating handwritten documents

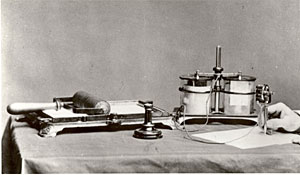
The complete duplicating outfit including Edison's electric pen.

Thomas Edison's electric pen, part of a complete outfit for duplicating handwritten documents and drawings, was the first relatively safe electric-motor-driven office appliance produced and sold in the United States.

== Development ==
Edison recognized the possible demand for a high-speed copying device after observing the incredible amount of document duplication required of merchants, lawyers, insurance companies, and those of similar occupations. To satisfy this demand, Edison invented the electric pen, which uses a perforating function inspired by the printing telegraph. Edison and his associate Charles Batchelor observed that as this device punctured the paper, a mark was left underneath by its chemical solution. Edison took advantage of this property and built the electric pen around it. The development of the electric pen took place in the summer of 1875. US patent 180,857 for autographic printing was issued to Thomas Edison in 1876, covering the pen, the duplication press, and accessories.

== Design and use ==
The electric pen was the key component of a complete duplicating system, which included the pen, a cast-iron holder with a wooden insert, a wet cell battery on a cast-iron stand, and a cast-iron flatbed duplicating press with an ink roller. All the cast-iron parts were black japanned, with gold striping or decoration. The hand-held electric pen was powered by a wet cell battery, which was wired to an electric motor mounted on top of a pen-like shaft. According to the manual, the motor drove a reciprocating needle that could make 50 punctures per second or 3,000 per minute. The user was instructed to place the stencil on firm blotting paper on a flat surface, then use the pen to write or draw naturally to form words and designs as a series of minute perforations in the stencil.

Once the stencil was prepared, it was placed in the flatbed duplicating press with a blank sheet of paper below. An inked roller was passed over the stencil, leaving an impression of the image on the paper. Edison boasted that over 5,000 copies could be made from one stencil.

== Advertising ==
=== Marketing ===
An advertising poster for the electric pen and press.

Edison’s main target audience included firms that depended on duplicating documents to run their business. To drive demand, Edison advertised in a circular that was written by the pen itself, in which the pen was called “the “Electro-Autographic Press” and was said to be “the only process yet invented whereby an unlimited number of impressions can be taken with rapidity from ordinary manuscript.” Another advertisement made by the pen reads “Like Kissing--Every Succeeding Impression is as Good as the First--Endorsed By Every One Who Has Tried It!--Only a Gentle Pressure Used.” with the words floating around an embracing couple.

=== Reception ===
Aside from companies, the electric pen was also marketed to the general public. Other uses for the invention were personal letters, pamphlets, music, contracts, circulars, and architectural and mechanical drawings, among other types of documents. In late 1875, the pen was at first sold only in the East Coast of the United States at the starting price of $30. It was further spread to the Midwest, British Columbia, and England after its rise in popularity when more than 150 pens were being sold monthly. The market continued to expand to Cuba and South America, with Europe and Asia being added by 1877. However, by 1880, the business for the electric pen started to decline when other inventions that were more efficient soon overtook Edison’s product in the market, causing it to eventually fall into obscurity. It is said that roughly 60,000 pens were sold throughout its commercial lifespan in total; however, this number is likely to be made up by Edison to give the product more publicity.

== Drawbacks ==
=== Battery operation ===
The major drawback to Edison’s electric pen was its wet cell battery, which had to be taken care of and maintained by experienced telegraphists. Due to its messy nature, it was important for Edison to incorporate batteries that were more acceptable to clerks who had to take care of the pen and its underlying machinery. Otherwise, the bankers and insurance people may never take interest in it, as said by Mullarkey, an ex-telegraph operator and New York agent for Edison.

=== Competition ===
The need for batteries in the electric pen ultimately caused its steady decline, as mechanical pens that did not require batteries to operate took over the market by 1880. These pens, along with other cheaper and simpler stencil-making technologies quickly became more popular and widely used, until all were eventually overtaken by the typewriter by the late 1880s.

== Legacy ==
=== Mimeograph ===
Edison started selling the rights to manufacture and market the pens as early as the end of 1876, but it was not until the mid-1880s that the A.B. Dick Company finally ended up with the rights and patent to the invention. The Chicago manufacturer went on to create the mimeograph, an electric pen spin-off marketed specifically as "Edison’s Mimeograph" under his permission. Unlike the electric pen, the mimeograph sold with relative success, and the A.B. Dick Company remained in business until 2004.

=== Tattoo industry ===
Samuel O’Reilly's patent for the first electric tattoo needle, based on the electric pen.

After its usefulness as a writing implement had ended, the electric pen was adapted to fulfill an entirely different role. In 1891, a New York City tattoo artist Samuel O’Reilly repurposed the electric pen’s design to be used as the first electric tattoo needle. What was previously done by hand was now done much faster thanks to this revolutionary device. Around this time, tattoos started to rise as a cultural phenomenon thanks to their popularity among European nobility. O’Reilly took advantage of this and produced an electric tattoo needle to give him the edge in this new market. O’Reilly enjoyed considerable success until his abrupt death in 1908. Charles Wagner, O’Reilly’s apprentice, inherited the business from his master.

=== Modern value ===
An October 2015 episode of History program American Pickers finds a European version Electric Pen in a private Wisconsin collection of early electric devices. The owner says recent auctions have seen other examples sell for between $15,000 and $20,000 USD This particular Electric Pen includes a rare battery box. The owner sells the Pen to the Pickers for $12,000, which they expect to resell at a higher price.

== See also ==
- Duplicating machines
- List of duplicating processes
