= Betty Broadbent =

American tattoo artist (1909–1983)

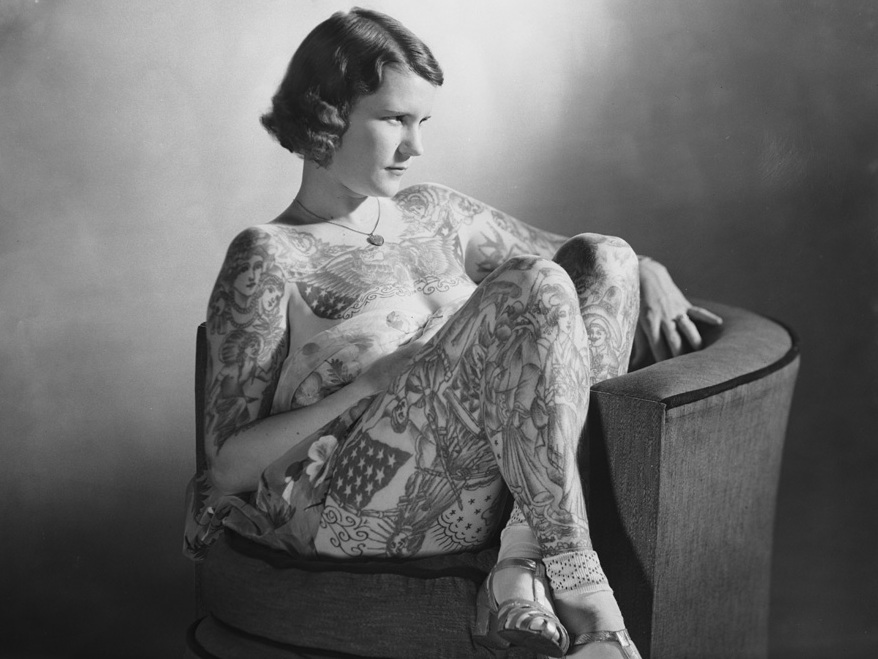
- Betty Broadbent, the 'Tattooed Venus', Sydney, 1938, photographer Ray Olson, Pix Magazine
- Born: Betty Broadbent; November 1, 1909; Zellwood, Florida, U.S.
- Died: March 28, 1983 (aged 73); Florida, U.S.
- Known for: Tattoo art

Betty Broadbent (November 1, 1909 – March 28, 1983), also known as the "Tattooed Venus," is regarded as the most photographed tattooed lady of the 20th century. She also worked as a tattoo artist. In 1981, she was the first person to be inducted into the Tattoo Hall of Fame.

== Early life ==
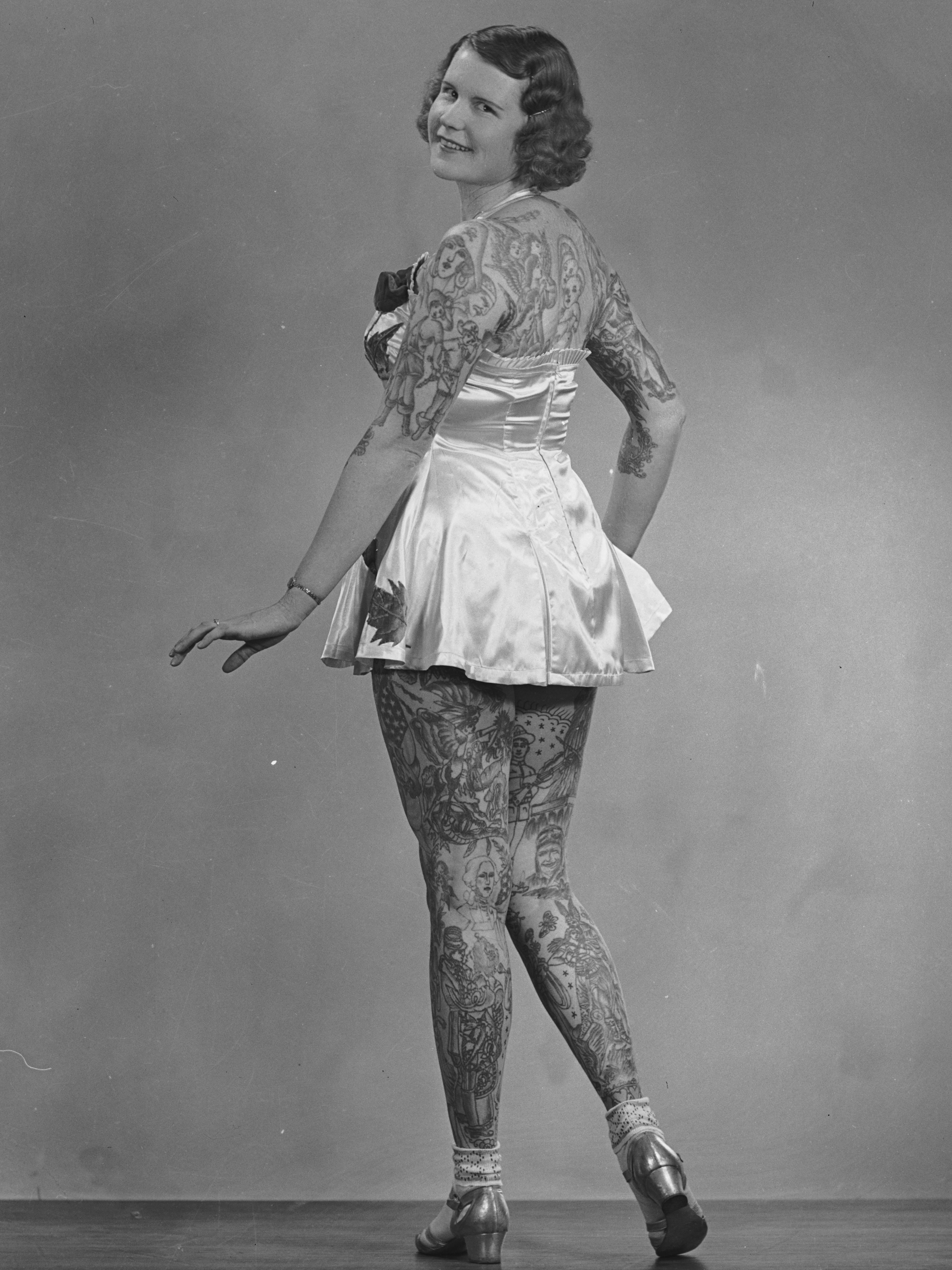
Betty Broadbent, 4 April 1938

Betty Broadbent was born Sue Lillian Brown on November 1, 1909, in Zellwood, Florida. Her parents were originally from North Carolina before moving the family to Philadelphia, where Broadbent spent much of her childhood.

At the age of 14, Broadbent moved to Atlantic City, New Jersey, to work as a nanny. While there, she met the tattooed performer Jack Redcloud, who introduced her to tattoo artist Charlie Wagner. According to Broadbent, seeing a tattooed man on the Atlantic City boardwalk inspired her to become tattooed herself. Over the next two years, Wagner, together with tattoo artists Tony Rhineagear, Joe Van Hart, and Red Gibbons, the husband of fellow tattooed performer Artoria Gibbons, created a bodysuit of more than 565 tattoos on Broadbent.

== Tattoo Artistry ==
Broadbent’s tattoos varied in theme. On Broadbent’s back, she had a tattoo of the Madonna and child. The art on her lower limbs included a tattoo of Charles Lindbergh on her right leg and a tattoo of Pancho Villa on her left. One of Broadbent’s more famous tattoos took over six sittings, a spread-eagle that stretched from one shoulder to the other. On May 3 of 1939, the New York Times quoted Broadbent stating, “It hurt something awful, but it was worth it.”

== Career ==
=== Circus career ===
Charlie Wagner was friends with the circus man Clyde Ingalls. When Ingalls discovered Broadbent’s passion for tattooing, he offered her a position at the circus. In the same year, Broadbent began exhibiting her art with the Ringling Brothers and Barnum and Bailey Circus. While working at the circus, Broadbent also trained as a steer rider who would perform with circus performer Tom Mix. Later in Broadbent’s career, she learned how to ride horses and mules.

=== International tours ===
In 1937, she began to work internationally. She spent time working for independent circuses in both New Zealand and Australia. After her return home to the United States and until her retirement in 1967, she continued to perform and travel with a sideshow.

=== 1939 New York World's Fair ===
While appearing in showman John Hix's Strange As It Seems exhibition at the 1939 New York World's Fair in New York City, she entered the world's first televised beauty contest, the Fairest of the Fair competition. Although she did not win, her appearance challenged conventional ideas of beauty by placing a heavily tattooed circus performer alongside contestants who represented the era's traditional standards of femininity. Wearing the same costume she used in her circus act, Broadbent revealed her tattoos by opening a long cape before the judges and audience.

=== Tattoo artist ===
In addition to exhibiting her art, Broadbent worked as a tattoo artist. She worked in shops across the country, including in Montreal, San Francisco, and New York.

== Death ==
Broadbent died in her sleep while living in Florida on March 28, 1983.

== See also ==
- Janet 'Rusty' Skuse
- Tattooed Man
- History of tattooing
- Lydia the Tattooed Lady
