= Samuel O'Reilly =

American tattoo artist

Samuel F. O'Reilly
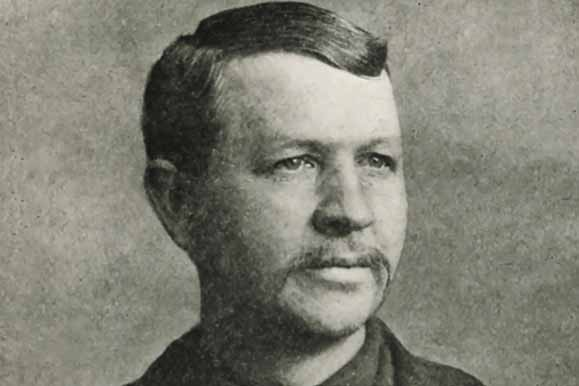
- Born: May 1854; Waterbury, Connecticut, US
- Died: April 29, 1909 (aged 54); Brooklyn, New York, US
- Resting place: Holy Cross Cemetery, Brooklyn
- Occupation: Tattoo artist
- Known for: Invented the rotary tattoo machine

Samuel F. O’Reilly (May 1854 - 29 April 1909) was an Irish American tattoo artist from New York, who patented the first electric tattoo machine on December 8, 1891.

== Biography ==
O’Reilly was born in Waterbury, New Haven County, Connecticut, to Irish immigrants Thomas O’Reilly and Mary Ann Hurley in May 1854.

He began tattooing in New York around the mid-1880s, probably mentored by Martin Hildebrandt. O'Reilly's machine was based on the rotary technology of Thomas Edison's autographic printing pen. Although O'Reilly held the first patent for an electric tattoo machine, tattoo artists had been experimenting with and modifying a variety of different machines prior to the issuance of the patent. O'Reilly's first pre-patent tattoo machine was a modified dental plugger, which he used to tattoo several dime museum attractions for exhibition between the years 1889 and 1891. From the late 1880s on, tattoo machines continually evolved into the modern tattoo machine.

O'Reilly first owned a shop at #5 Chatham Square on the New York Bowery. In 1904, he moved to #11 Chatham Square when the previous tenant, tattoo artist Elmer Getchell, left the city. Charles Wagner was allegedly apprenticed to O'Reilly and later assumed ownership of his #11 Chatham Square shop.

On April 29, 1909, Samuel O'Reilly fell while painting his house and died. He is buried in Holy Cross Cemetery, Brooklyn, NY.
