= Tattoo machine =

Hand-held device used to create a tattoo

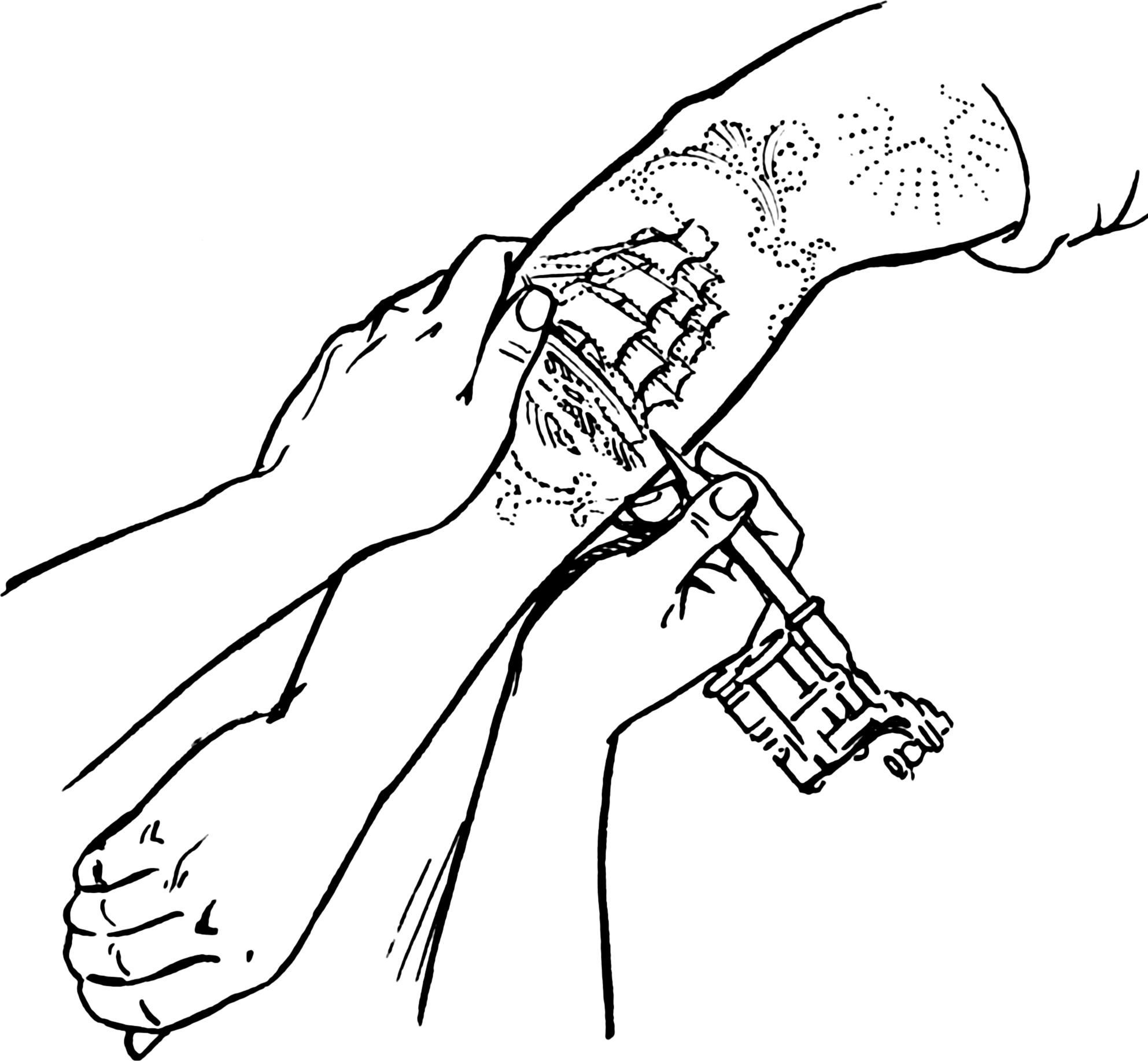
Illustration of artist working on a traditional sailor tattoo

A tattoo machine (colloquially referred to as a tattoo gun) is a hand-held device generally used to create a tattoo, a permanent marking of the skin with indelible ink. Modern tattoo machines use electromagnetic coils to move an armature bar up and down. Connected to the armature bar is a barred needle grouping that opens the skin for the ink to flow into. All electromagnetic coil machines are powered by a wired regulated DC power supply which sends an electric current through the copper coils wrapped around opposing magnets and then moves the armature bar up and down. In addition to coil tattoo machines, there are also rotary tattoo machines, which are operated with regulated rotary motors and are powered by a wired external RC power supply or a wireless battery pack attached to the machine. There are many types of rotary machines, some that look similar to coil machines and some that look more like "pens". Coil machines are usually each tuned for a single function, such as for shading, or lining or packing ink. Rotary machines are multifunctional, taking any size or type of needle or cartridge needle. "The basic machine is pretty much unchanged today, in recent years variations of the theme have crept into the market, namely Manfred Kohrs' rotary machine of 1978 or Carson Hill’s pneumatic machine that uses compressed air rather than electricity, but the principle is essentially the same."

== History ==
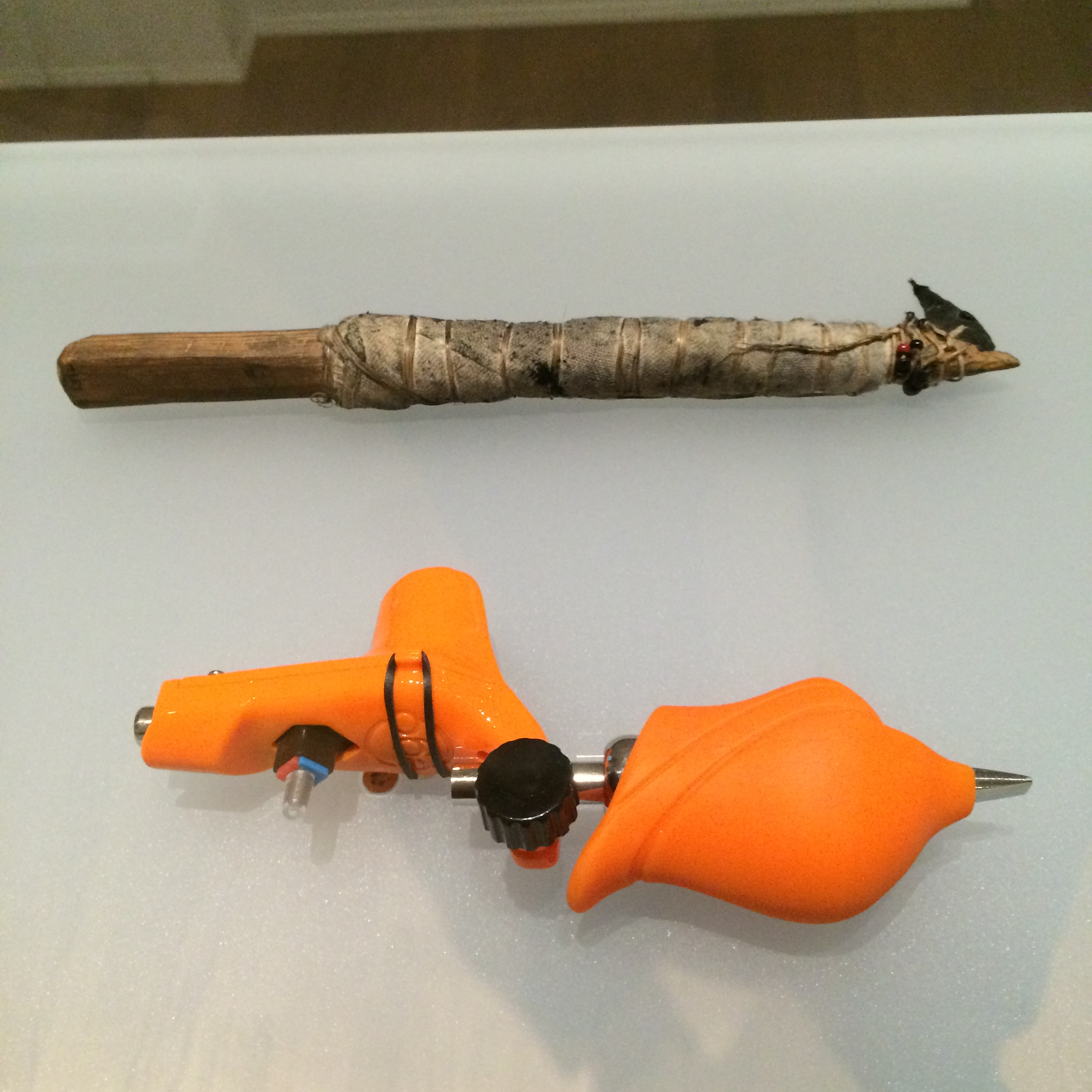
Traditional and modern tools at the Museum of Art and Design Hamburg; see history of tattooing

The predecessor to the tattoo machine was Thomas Edison's electric pen, patented under the title Stencil-Pens in Newark, New Jersey, United States in 1876. It was originally intended to be used as a duplicating device, but in 1891, Samuel O'Reilly discovered that Edison's machine could be modified and used to introduce ink into the skin, and later patented a tube and needle system to provide an ink reservoir.

While O'Reilly's machine was based on the tattoo rotary technology of Edison's device, modern tattoo machines use electromagnets. The first machine based on this technology was a single coil machine patented by Thomas Riley of London, just twenty days after O'Reilly filed the patent for his rotary machine. For his machine, Riley placed a modified doorbell assembly in a brass box. The modern two-coil configuration was patented by Alfred Charles South, also of London. Because it was so heavy, a spring was often attached to the top of the machine and the ceiling to take most of the weight off the operator's hand.

″To move tattooing forward, German tattoo artist Manfred Kohrs had to take a look backward.″ In 1978, Kohrs "introduced the first new design for a rotary machine in nearly a century. His machine was functionally similar to O'Reilly's except an electric DC motor, rather than electrified magnets, drove the needles. This slimmer and streamlined version became lighter, quieter, and more portable. It also gave artists more control while ensuring the operator's hands and fingers cramped less. While some artists gravitated to this rotary revival, others preferred to stick with their trusty coil machines."

Most modern tattoo machines can control needle depth, speed, and force of application, which has allowed tattooing to become a very precise art form. Such advances in precision have also produced a style of facial tattooing that has attained mainstream popularity in America called dermapigmentation, or "permanent cosmetics" creating results such as addition/removal of freckles, beauty spots and scars.

=== Gallery ===
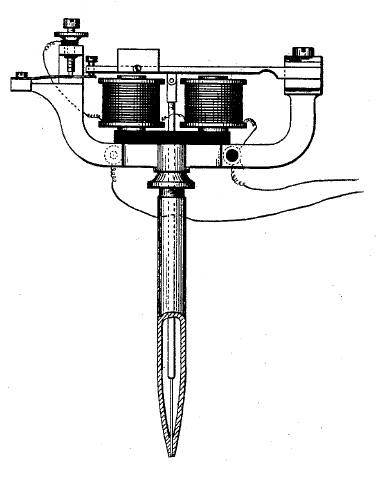
U.S. patent 196,747, Stencil-Pens

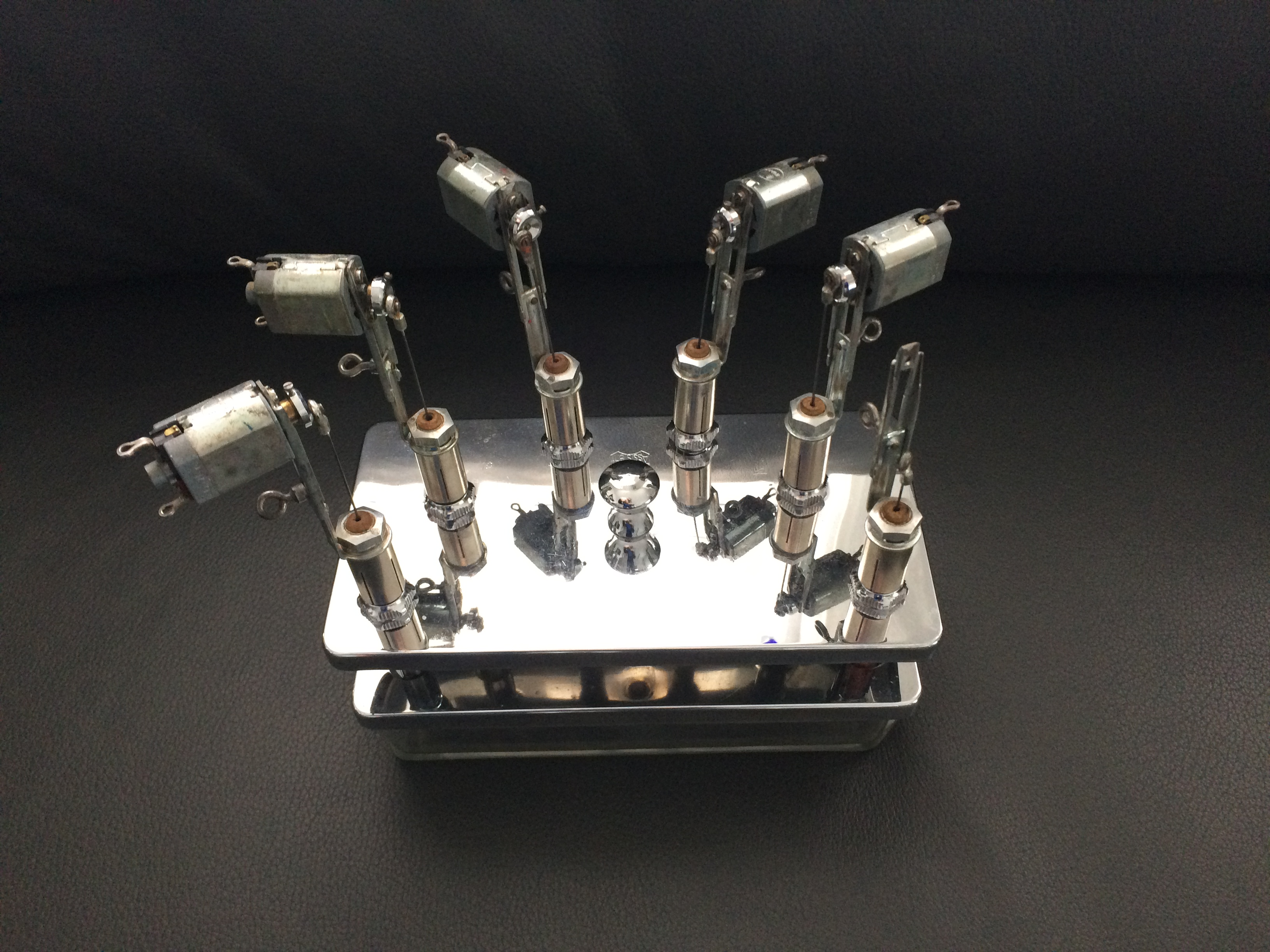
Rotary-Set „Kohrs 1978“

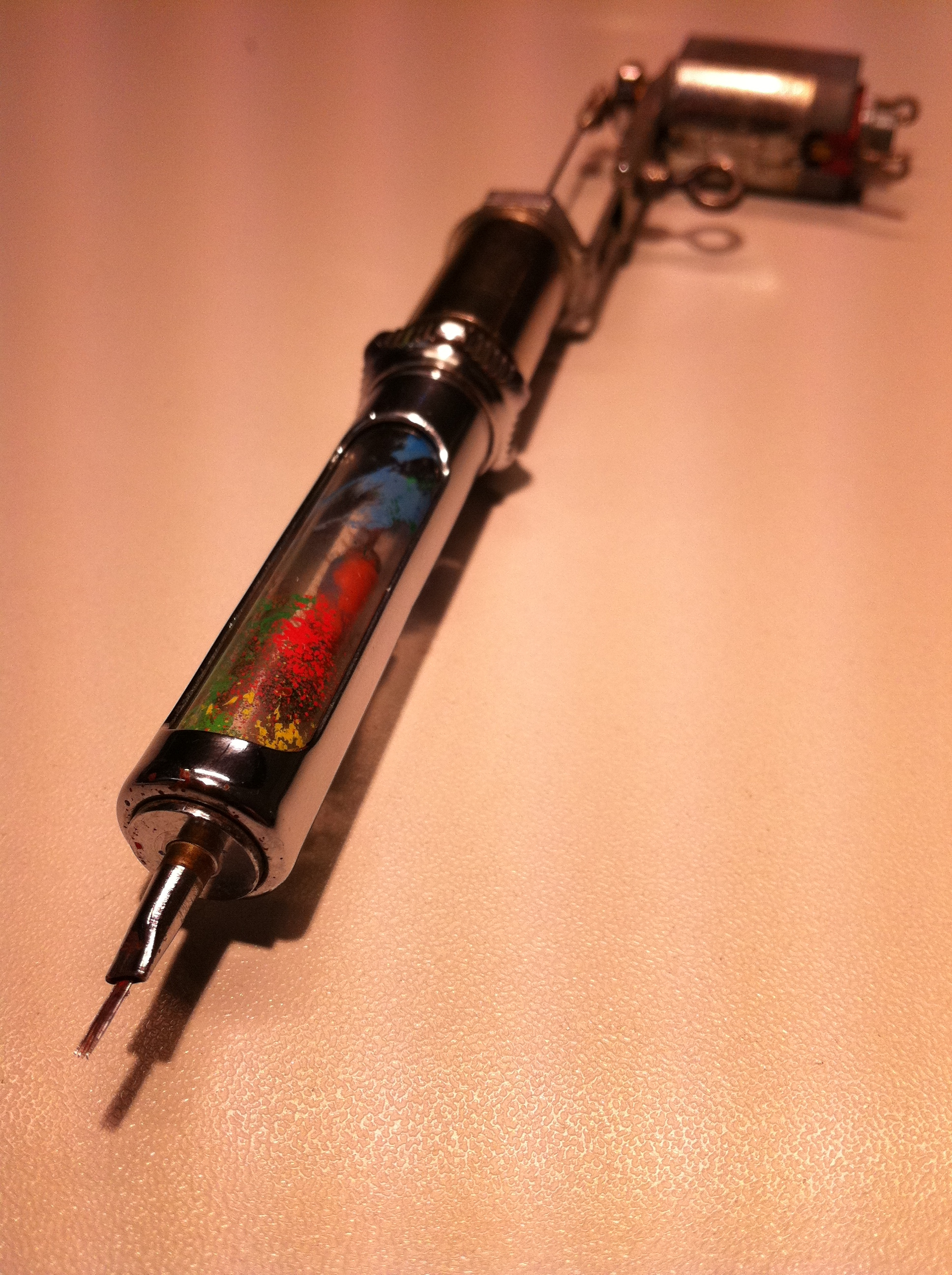
Manfred Kohrs 1978 - Rotary tattoo machine

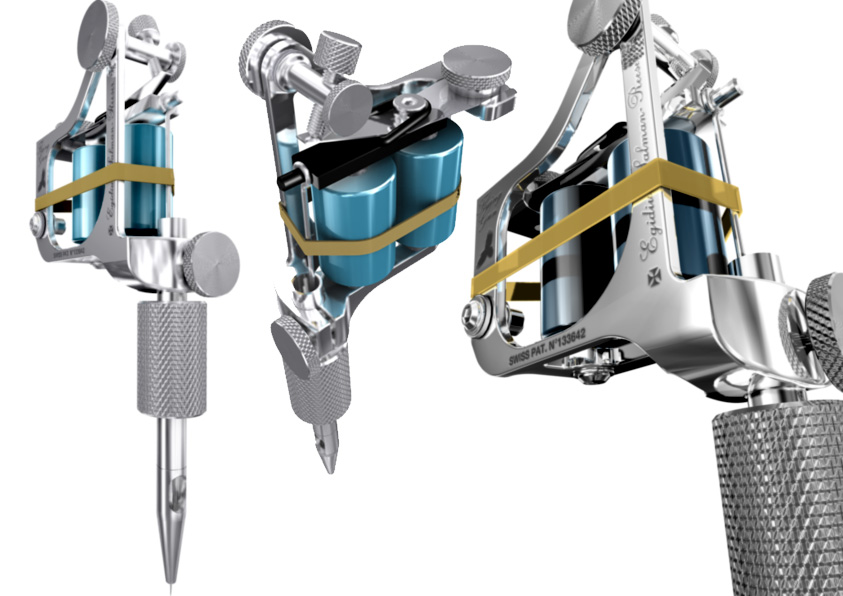
Two-coil tattoo machine

== Classification ==
There are many types of machines. Liners and shaders are the more common machines from a technical standpoint. Mechanically, there are coil tattoo machines; also pneumatic machines, and rotary, or linear, tattoo machines.

- Rotary tattoo machines were the original machines, based on rotary technology, which was invented by Samuel O'Reilly and improved by the tattoo artists through the years. Rotary type machines use an electric motor to drive the needles. Some recent upgrades include using an armature bar to increase efficiency, a characteristic of coil machines. Recently, there have been improvements to make this type of machine pneumatic, in place of the electric motor used now.
- Coil tattoo machines are the most commonly seen and used. These machines use an electromagnetic circuit to move the needle grouping. There are many variations, from single-coiled machines to triple-coiled machines. They can be made from many different materials and in many different sizes and shapes. Dual-coiled machines are considered to be standard. The coils generally range from 8 to 10 wrap. The coils create the impedance, or resistance, used to properly regulate the machine's speed and power. This causes less trauma to the skin.
- Liner tattoo machine: The purpose of a liner machine is to lay the ink in the skin in one single pass to create a dominant line. It uses a short contact circuit (about 1.5mm–2mm), which causes the machine to cycle faster.
- Shader tattoo machine: The shader machine is commonly used to shade black or variants of black ink, though colors other than black are also used in this type of machine. The saturation level of this machine is low. It uses a bigger contact gap than a liner (about 2mm–3.5mm) to make it cycle slightly slower. This machine is also used for sculpting lines. Some artists will use this type of machine for all lines, as it allows the lines to be retraced with less trauma to the skin.
- Pneumatic tattoo machine: Tattoo artist Carson Hill in the year 2000 invented the first pneumatic tattoo machine and began the patent process. A pneumatic tattoo machine is powered by an air compressor and is extremely lightweight. Pneumatic tattoo machines use pressurized air to drive the needles up and down. These tattoo machines are easily sterilized as the entire machine can be placed in an autoclave without any major disassembly (unlike traditional coil machines which require complete disassembly before being placed in an autoclave).

Tattoo machines are not limited to just these types. A common variant is having a "cutback", which uses stiffer front springs. This is more commonly used in liners, but is known to be used on shader machines, more typically for portrait work. Machines are usually categorized into long stroke and short stroke varieties. The longer-stroked machines are good for coloring and shading, as well as sculpting lines, while doing less damage to clients' skin. Shorter-stroke machines are commonly used for lining in a single pass style, and also in a shader setup to achieve a more subtle gradation of black such as would be found in portraits. Length, width, tension, angle, and stiffness of the spring varies the functionality of the machine. The contact gaps, as well as capacitors and even the style of machine and its angles of deflection, can also all be variants in machine tuning. The proper tuning of the machine is essential for the type of machine being used, also for the type of tattoo the artist is doing.

== Coil machine mechanisms ==
Coil tattoo machines function by passing current through two coils which alternate electromagnetic forces to move the tattoo needle up and down rapidly. Power supplies adapt AC current to power the machine. This allows artists to control the voltage at which their machines operate at and can be manipulated to achieve line variation. Coil machines consist of about fifteen different parts including but not limited to the needle, tube, tube grip, tube clamp, needle bar, armature bar, front spring, contact screw, o-ring, rear spring, rear spring mounting screw, and a yoke. These parts are held together with a frame. Frames are constructed from a wide variety of materials such as brass, iron, steel, zinc, and aluminum. The type of frame used heavily influences the overall operation of the tattoo machine. Some frames (such as those constructed from iron or brass) reduce vibration during operation. Other lighter frames (such as those constructed from aluminum and zinc) reduce the physical strain on artists during operation. Improper frame selection/alignment affect the longevity and quality of a coil machine’s overall function. Coil tattoo machines give artists a high degree of control over every aspect of the machine’s function. This requires artists to be intimately knowledgeable about their machines to efficiently utilize such a device.

== Rotary machine mechanisms ==
Rotary tattoo machines function by using the rotational motion of an electric motor to move a needle/bundle of tattoo needles up and down rapidly. Rotary machines, like coil machines, require a power supply that adapt AC current to power the machine. This voltage may be manipulated to achieve line variation. Rotary machines consist of about seven different parts including but not limited to the grip, tube, cam wheel, “adjustment mechanism”, and a power connection. Rotary machines vary in the type of needle they use. Common rotary machines use standard needles but can also use cartridge needles. This differs from the more traditional “coil tattoo machine” as one rotary machine can be used for both lining and shading. Rotary machines can be purchased pre-aligned and generally work “out of the box”. This makes them more beginner friendly. The electric motor that drives the needle up and down reduces the operational vibration of the machine and thusly reduces the physical strain of tattooing on artists. Rotary machines of all types typically produce less noise and vibration during operation. Coil machines produce a sort of buzzing noise that has commonly been associated with tattooing. Clients sometimes feel more comfortable being tattooed using a rotary machine due to how quiet the machines are. Rotary machines come in a variety of types. Direct drive rotary machines connect the needle bar directly to the motor. Eccentric rotary machines use an eccentric cam drive that converts the rotational movement of the motor to an oscillating motion which in turn drives the needle. Pneumatic rotary machines, as their name implies, utilize compressed air to directly oscillate the tattoo needle and do not use an electric motor whatsoever.

== Selected bibliography ==
- Victoria Groß: Hautgravuren – Zur Individualisierung des Körpers. GRIN Verlag 2006, ISBN 3-638-57827-5.
- Anne Fuest: Die Tätowierung – Geschichte und Bedeutung in Afrika und Deutschland: Eine kulturanthropologische Untersuchung. GRIN Verlag 2008, ISBN 3-640-21092-1.
- Matthias Friederich: Tätowierungen in Deutschland: eine kultursoziologische Untersuchung. Band 14 von Quellen und Forschungen zur europäischen Ethnologie, Königshausen & Neumann 1993, ISBN 3-884-79774-3.
- Erick Alayon: The Craft of Tattooing. CreateSpace Independent Publishing Platform 2006, ISBN 1-419-62591-8.
