= Cover-up tattoo =

Tattoo that covers an earlier tattoo, scar, or skin condition

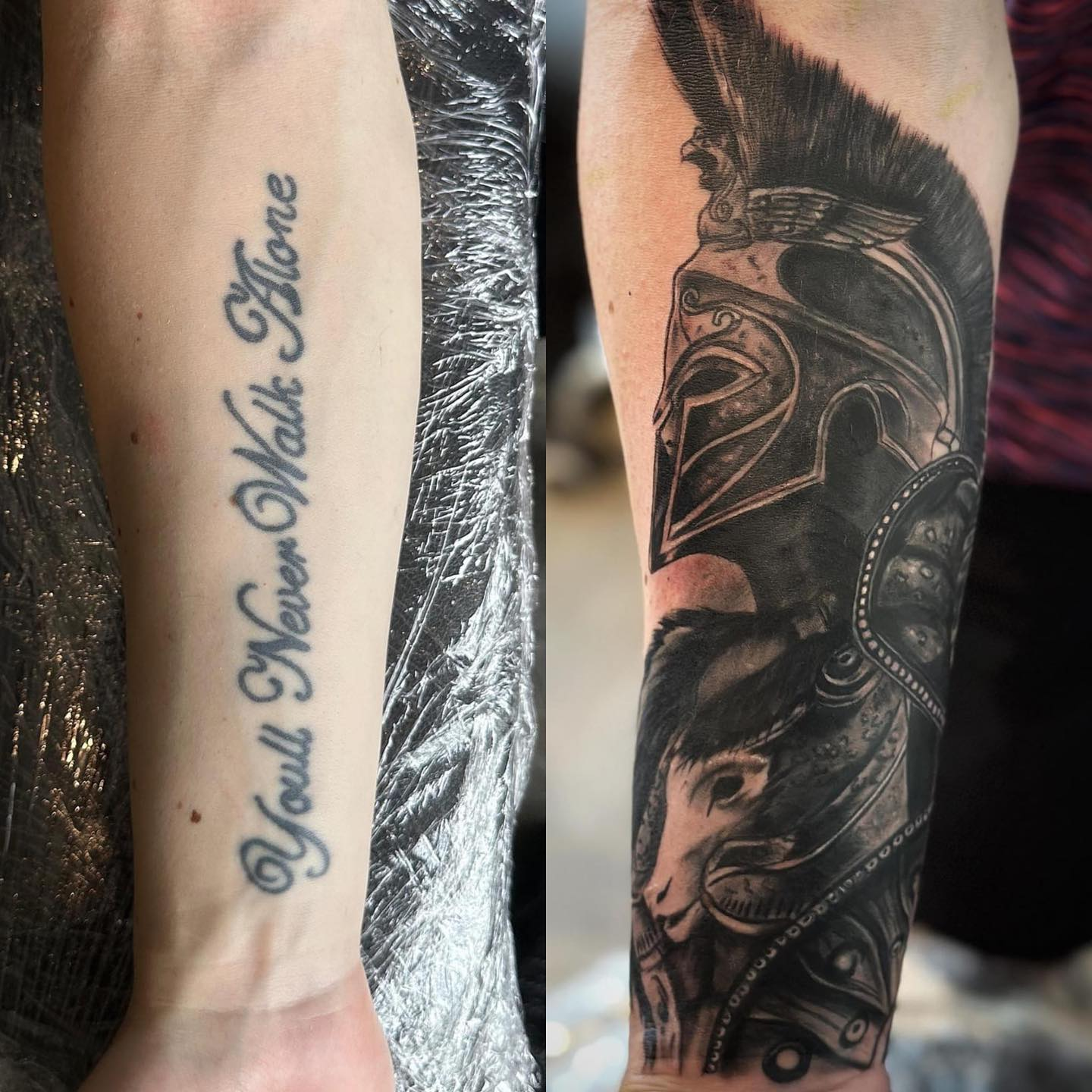
A tattoo of the lyric "Youll [sic] Never Walk Alone" and the tattoo of Bellerophon that covered it up.

Cover-up tattoos are those done over one or more previous tattoos, scars, or skin conditions.

People cover up old tattoos for a variety of reasons, such as that the tattoos were references to relationships that have ended, the tattoos were nonconsensual, or the tattoos relate to gangs or hate speech. Cover-ups after breakups have received particular attention due to high-profile cases involving celebrities. Cover-ups are one of the two main options of removing an unwanted tattoo, the other being laser removal. Covering up an unwanted tattoo is generally cheaper, less painful and an overall easier solution than tattoo removal.

A decorative cover-up tattoo can obscure a scar or skin condition with personally meaningful art, making it an alternative to more flesh-like paramedical tattoos. For example, in lieu of reconstruction post-mastectomy, a person may choose to get a decorative tattoo over their scars. Self-harm scars are another common target for cover-ups.

Both scars and old tattoo ink present additional challenges for a tattoo artist. Some tattoo artists specialize in cover-ups, and some give free cover-ups for cases such as hate symbols, human trafficking tattoos, and self-harm scars.

== Contexts ==
=== Unwanted past tattoos ===
A former gang member has a white supremacist tattoo (already partly covered up) transformed into a dharmachakra

A person may seek a cover-up tattoo if they wish to distance themselves from existing tattoos. The simplest reason is that they do not like how a tattoo appears on their body. In particular, cover-ups are associated with regret for the original tattoo. A 2013 study of tattoo removal and cover-up recipients found that regret often stems from dissatisfaction with the narrative that the tattoo represents, either due to the tattoo not being meaningful or to the symbolism being unsatisfying. Tattoo artists who do cover-ups are commonly asked to cover tattoos related to a person's past relationship. People also cover up tattoos related to non-romantic relationships, such as relatives from whom they have become estranged.

As tattoos grew more mainstream in the 1990s and even more in the 2000s, celebrity tattoos received significant attention, especially cover-ups of couples tattoos after breakups. After breaking up with actress Winona Ryder in 1993, actor Johnny Depp partially covered up a "Winona Forever" tattoo, to read "Wino Forever". Further notable post-breakup cover-ups include Denise Richards and Angelina Jolie.

Popular culture in the 2010s included further growth in the popularity of tattoos and coverage of celebrity cover-up tattoos. In 2017, influencer Kylie Jenner had her lowercase "t" for rapper Tyga changed to "la" after their breakup. After marital separation in 2020, Nick Cannon replaced a large back tattoo of singer Mariah Carey's first name with a depiction of the crucifixion of Jesus. Comedian Pete Davidson and singer Ariana Grande got a combined 16 tattoos relating to each other before breaking off their engagement in 2018, then multiple cover-ups.

People also seek to cover up tattoos they received non-consensually. In the 17th century, the use of irezumi kei (penal tattoos) for prisoners in Japan fell out of practice largely because released prisoners would cover them up with decorative designs. Some sex trafficking victims who are subjected to branding tattoos later cover them up with chosen tattoos. In the United States and Canada, organizations including Survivor's Ink and Unbound facilitate such cover-ups.

Cover-ups can also be due to a change in what a person wants to be associated with, such as tattoos that convey religious views or connections to drugs or violence. A person may also not want to be associated with a particular work or artist; in one prominent example, many Harry Potter fans have covered tattoos related to the franchise due to author J. K. Rowling's views on transgender issues. Tattoos that represent hateful views or affiliation with criminal groups are a frequent subject of cover-ups. In the 1800s, prisoners on convict ships from Great Britain to Van Diemen's Land (Tasmania) sometimes "over-tattooed" old tattoos with new designs that defied state efforts to track their tattoos as identifying marks. Alphonse Bertillon's Signaletic Instructions, translated into English in 1896, contains instructions on identifying former prisoners who have had their tattoos "surcharged" (covered up) or removed. Due to rising anti-gang enforcement from the 1990s onwards, it has become increasingly common for gangsters to cover up their gang tattoos despite still being members.

=== Scars and skin conditions ===
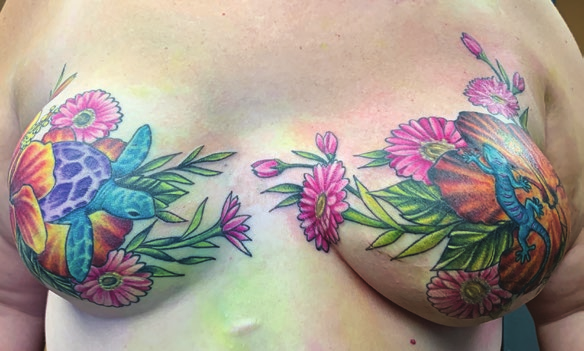
A decorative tattoo over mastectomy scars, chosen in lieu of restorative tattoos that replicate the nipple and areola

The use of flesh-like medical tattoos to cover up skin conditions and surgical scars is a long-established practice, dating to the German doctor Pauli in 1835, who used mercury sulfide and white lead to tattoo over skin lesions including nevi and purple plaque, or even to Galen, who executed tattoos of sorts over corneal opacities in 150 CE.

In the 21st century, decorative cover-up tattoos became a more popular approach to obscuring scars, including burns, self-harm scars, surgical scars, and stretch marks. In cases of scars that are hyperpigmented, uneven in texture, or cover a large area, it is often not possible to restore the flesh's previous appearance; decorative tattoos serve to either cover or camouflage these scars instead. A 2008 case report, one of the first medical articles on the subject, noted patients taking the initiative in receiving decorative cover-ups. In the early 2010s, decorative tattoos emerged as a trend after breast cancer–related mastectomy, particularly in the United States. Some transmasculine people who receive mastectomies also opt for decorative cover-ups. A 2021 systematic review speculated that decorative scar concealment is one of the most common applications of medical tattooing in a cosmetic or reconstructive context, but noted a lack of evidence, perhaps because many such tattoos happen at the patient's initiative rather than through a medical provider.

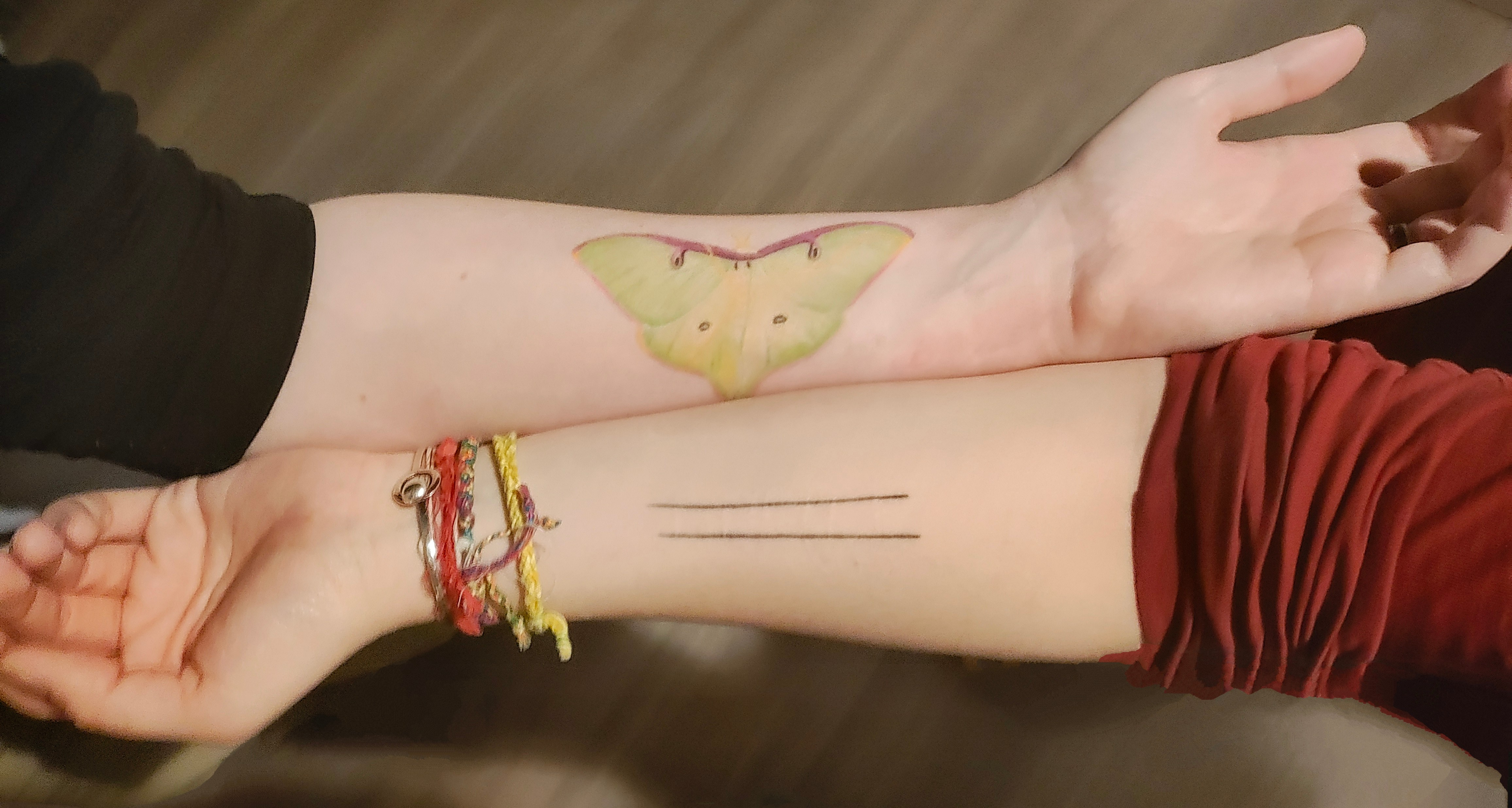
Two approaches to self-harm cover-ups: an image of a Luna moth obscures burn scars); two black lines transform cutting scars into a representation of a ladder.

Similarly, it can be difficult to hide vitiligo with tattooed pigment, and so some people choose to get artistic tattoos as a distraction. Tattoos are recommended only for people whose conditions are stable, as tattooing may itself trigger vitiligo. In 2021, a research team developed a system to print customized temporary tattoos onto the bodies of children with vitiligo.

For people with self-harm scars, cover-up tattoos can be a way of moving past trauma. One motivation for tattooing an area may be to discourage oneself from self-harming in it again, although some may nonetheless cut on top of a tattoo. Some people choose to incorporate self-harm scars into tattoo designs, for instance making them look like scratch marks from a dragon. Public figures with self-harm cover-up tattoos include Paris Jackson and Pete Davidson. Self-harm cover-ups raise the complication that the pain of the tattoo process may trigger memories of self-harming.

Like past tattoos, intentional scars may also be covered due to their associations. For instance, actress India Oxenberg covered the brand she received in the NXIVM cult with a mandala design.

== Methods ==
=== Technique ===
An artist tattoos a detailed face and seascape over a stylized 'R'.

Covering a previous tattoo is more difficult than creating a fresh tattoo, so it requires skill and experience. In cover-up tattoos, the previous tattoo has made the skin more sensitive and more passes of the needle are required, damaging the skin more than a first tattoo does. This means the artist needs to be especially careful to work at the correct depth and with the right amount of color in the needle.

Poorly applied, faded, or light tattoos are the easiest to cover, especially tattoos that are at least several years old. A person may choose to lighten a tattoo using laser removal before getting a cover-up design.

When tattooing over scars, especially raised scars, it can be difficult for an artist to get the ink to stay in place. As a result, some artists are averse to the practice. Canadian tattoo artist Becky Jónsson, who has cover-ups over their own dermatillomania scars and specializes in scarred skin, told CBC News in 2023 that many clients choose to continue with tattoos even if their tissue cannot hold ink to the desired degree.

=== Design ===
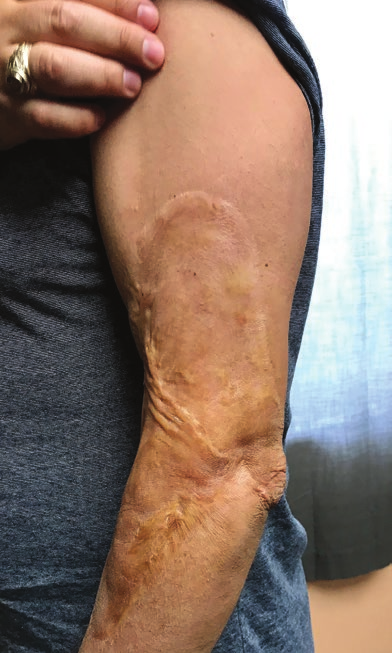
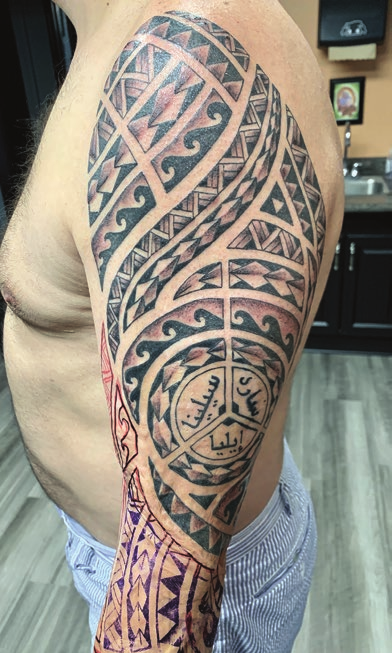
A man's arm before and after receiving a decorative medical tattoo over a large burn scar

A cover-up can modify an existing tattoo by adding details, colors, or new elements, or it can completely mask the old tattoo with a new design. A colorful image with a lot of shading and shapes, such as animals or flowers, can offer more coverage than an image in black-and-gray style.

A person may choose to completely cover an old tattoo with black ink with a simple boxy shape or a "blackout" tattoo design. Flesh tones are generally ineffective for cover-ups, as they lack the translucence of untattooed skin and are rarely able to cover up dark colors.

Cover-up designs are typically bigger in size compared to the previous design, as it helps to hide the design. Some of the previous tattoo may still be partially visible to a person familiar with the original design. Special photography techniques, including infrared photography, may also be able to detect the underlying tattoo design.

Individuals may choose a new design that does not completely obscure the previous tattoo, a style known as "blast-over" tattooing.

== Practices ==
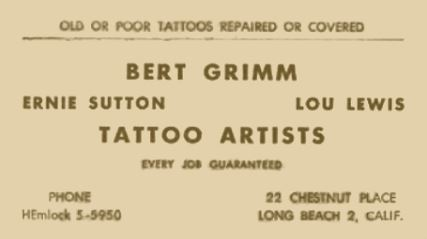
Bert Grimm business card, circa 1940, advertising "old or poor tattoos repaired or covered"

Tattoo artists may offer discounted or complimentary sessions for cover-up tattoos. Some artists have gained note for doing so for sexual trafficking survivors. Others do so for covering self-harm scars.

One tattoo shop in Kentucky, United States, which began offering free cover-ups of racist tattoos in the wake of the murder of George Floyd, received 20 requests in about a month. Three months later, a different Kentucky shop with the same policy reported doing four to six cover-ups a week of racist tattoos. They deferred excess demand to other shops, some of which requested donations to Black Lives Matter in lieu of payment. In the U.S. state of Oklahoma, an annual event offers free cover-ups of hateful and gang-related tattoos, including those associated with Juggalo culture (due to the existence of Juggalo gangs). The event's organizer noted that "Just because you hate your ex-wife, doesn't make that a hate tattoo" that will be covered up for free.

A tattoo applied on top of another tattoo can make laser removal more challenging, because lasers target specific wavelengths, and in the same location there may be multiple pigments with different wavelengths.
