= UV tattoo =

Tattoo made with dye only visible under blacklight

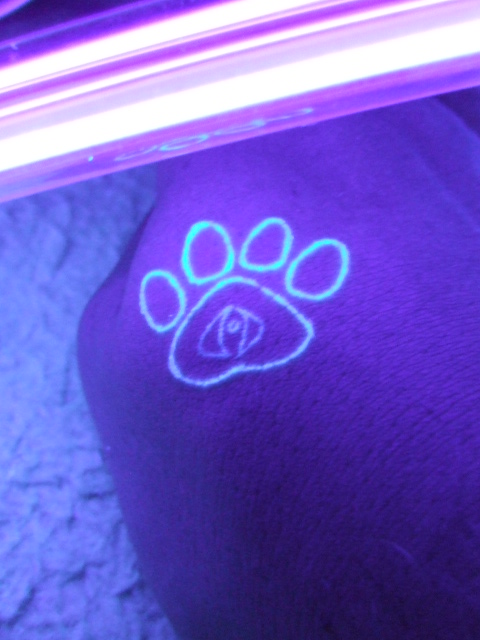
UV tattoo on a hand illuminated under blacklight

UV tattoos or blacklight tattoos are tattoos made with dyes that fluoresce visibly under a blacklight or other ultraviolet (UV) light source. Depending upon the tattoo ink used, an ultraviolet tattoo can be nearly invisible when illuminated only by light within the visible spectrum. Blacklight tattoo ink does not glow in the dark, but reacts to non-visible ultraviolet light, producing a visible glow by fluorescence.

People get UV tattoos for decorative reasons, including because they are illuminated at dance clubs that use blacklights. Researchers have also identified medical uses for tattoos made with UV ink, such as marking significant locations on the skin while preserving a patient's sense of body image or privacy.

UV tattoo ink is typically made with fluorescent dyes encapsulated in microparticles. This ink may cause irritation, and tattoo artists are divided on whether they consider it safe to use.

== Uses ==
UV tattoos were first used for animal identification markers.

UV tattoos are sometimes chosen by people who do not want tattoos visible under normal light for professional or social reasons. This style of tattoo has been popular in the raver community because it shows up under blacklight at clubs.

=== Medical ===
UV tattoos have several applications as medical tattoos. Fiducial markers for guiding radiation therapy are often tattooed in dark ink, and ultraviolet tattoos have been studied as an alternative to minimize impact on patient body image. To support detection and treatment of potential skin cancer, the site of a biopsy can be marked with a UV tattoo to ensure correct identification of that site afterward. A researcher proposed using a UV tattoo to mark a password for a pacemaker (or other implantable medical device) on the skin, enabling medical personnel to unlock the device if needed, without requiring the person to wear a medical bracelet.

Researchers have studied creating smart tattoos with fluorescent glucose biosensors, where "the tattoo ink is functionalized with microparticles which produce fluorescence when the concentration of a biomarker in the interstitial fluid increases." Microneedle patches could be used to deliver injections, such as vaccines, while simultaneously tattooing a simple image or year in ultraviolet ink to record information about the injection while preserving the patient's privacy.

Photochromic tattoos that react to UV light to change the color of the pigment itself, instead of exhibiting fluorescence, have been patented. One potential use of photochromic ink is to tattoo "freckles" that only appear if that area of skin has had a certain amount of UV exposure, to help the person monitor sun exposure for skin cancer prevention.

== Appearance and application ==
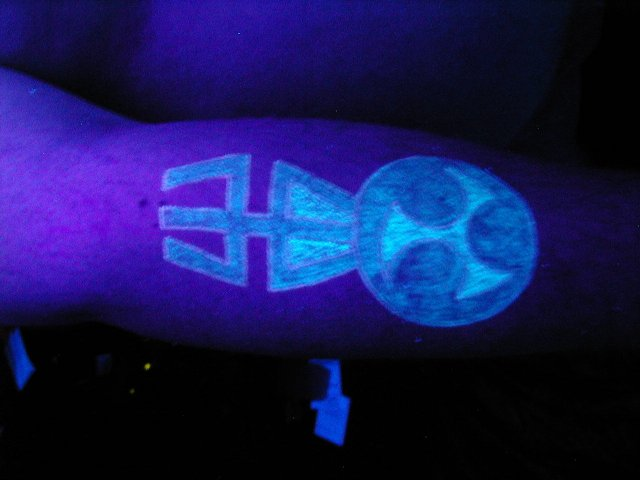
UV tattoo as shown under blacklight

A tattoo made with UV ink becomes visible under blacklight, when it fluoresces in colors depending on the ink chosen, typically white or purple. Although ultraviolet dye is invisible in normal light, scarring produced by the tattoo machine in the application process will remain, and therefore still show.

Colored inks are also available, where the ink contains a mix of pigment visible in normal light and dye that glows under UV light, but the resulting color is not as vibrant in either lighting situation as a dedicated ink. UV ink can alternatively be used to highlight tattoos made with regular ink: normal ink is used to create a tattoo, allowed to heal, and then highlighted with UV inks.

UV inks are made with distilled water and cannot be mixed with regular inks, which are usually based on alcohol. Additionally their consistency is thinner. Tattoo artists working with UV ink need to use a handheld blacklight during the application process to check their work. UV inking is more difficult than using conventional inks and requires a longer application process. People with UV tattoos also need to take special care during the healing process, avoiding ultraviolet light and lotions that can damage the tattoo.

Ultraviolet light, such as from the sun, can damage compounds in any kind of tattoo ink, causing the tattoo to change over time. For UV tattoos this may mean the tattoo becomes more visible under visible light or may not glow in black lighting.

== Formulas and safety ==
A typical blacklight ink formula includes microspheres of poly(methyl methacrylate) (PMMA) containing fluorescent dye. Another example of a commercially available ink contained a coumarin-based fluorescent dye in a polymer matrix containing melamine formaldehyde.

The United States Food and Drug Administration has not approved any inks or pigments for injection into human skin for cosmetic purposes, although they take action on contaminated inks that can cause infections. Companies may claim FDA approval, but any approval of UV inks is for animal identification purposes rather than human use.

Tattoos made with any ink can sometimes cause allergic reactions, irritation, and other side effects, although some chemical components tend to trigger more reactions than others. UV tattoo inks made with PMMA or melamine have been documented to occasionally cause irritation (dermatitis) and inflammation (including granuloma). In one case, inflammation (a skin manifestation of sarcoidosis) happened five years after receiving a UV tattoo made with PMMA.

Some tattoo artists purchase and use UV inks from manufacturers they consider reputable, especially manufacturers that provide Material Safety Data Sheets with information about ink ingredients. Other artists are concerned that the inks may be harmful, even carcinogenic, and avoid them.

UV tattoos may be difficult to remove with standard laser tattoo removal because of the lack of pigment in the skin.
