= Ephemeral (company) =

American company that produces fading tattoo ink

- Type: Privately held company
- Industry: Tattoo
- Founded: 2016; 10 years ago
- Founders: Seung Shin, Vandan Shah, Joshua Sakhai, Brennal Pierre, and Anthony Lam
- Headquarters: Brooklyn, New York, United States
- Products: Made to fade tattoo ink and tattoo studios
- Services: Tattoos
- Website: ephemeral.tattoo

Ephemeral is an American company that produces tattoo ink that is designed to fade over 1-3 years. The company is based in New York City. It had operated a chain of tattoo studios that used its ink, but these were all closed in 2023. The business continued to work with existing tattoo artists and studies in the United States and across the world to deliver the made-to-fade tattoo ink.

Ephemeral’s tattoo ink is made of bioabsorbable polymer particles that were designed to break down over time, eventually degrading enough to be eliminated by the immune system.

The company initially raised a large amount of investment based on its tattoo ink product which was supposed to fade in 9 to 15 months. This turned out not to be case in actual use with some user experiencing much longer times before the tattoo faded. In February 2023, the company updated the timeframe, saying that 70% of tattoos will fade within three years.

== History ==
The company was founded by five students at New York University in 2016, two of whom, Shah and Pierre, invented the Ephemeral’s ink.

The work to develop the fading ink started in 2011 when Shin wanted to know if it was possible to remove a tattoo with an enzyme. Pierre and Shah spent the next seven years developing an ink that would be broken down by the body's natural mechanism. The cofounders tested prototypes on themselves.

In 2015, Ephemeral won first place in the $200K Entrepreneurs Challenge, an annual competition hosted by NYU's Stern School of Business.

In 2021, after videos of people getting Ephemeral tattoos became popular on TikTok, the company raised $20 million in Series A funding.

In March 2023, Ephemeral's patent application was transferred to TriplePoint Capital, a debt financing company.

The company opened a number of stores, but in September 2023, Ephemeral announced that they were closing all of their studio locations, and instead continued selling their ink to existing tattoo studios.

== Concerns ==
Soon after the company started, customers complained that their Ephemeral tattoos did not fade, even after fifteen to nineteen months.

In response to these concerns, ink co-inventor Brennal Pierre stated: "As a researcher, I expect these things. We come up with what we think is an average in what the data has shown us, and that’s what we present. But when you put it out in the wild, different things happen."

Dr. Roy Grekin, director of the Dermatologic Surgery and Laser Center at UC San Francisco stated he wasn't surprised to hear that different people experienced different fade times with Ephemeral tattoos.
