= Blackout tattoo =

Tattoo style

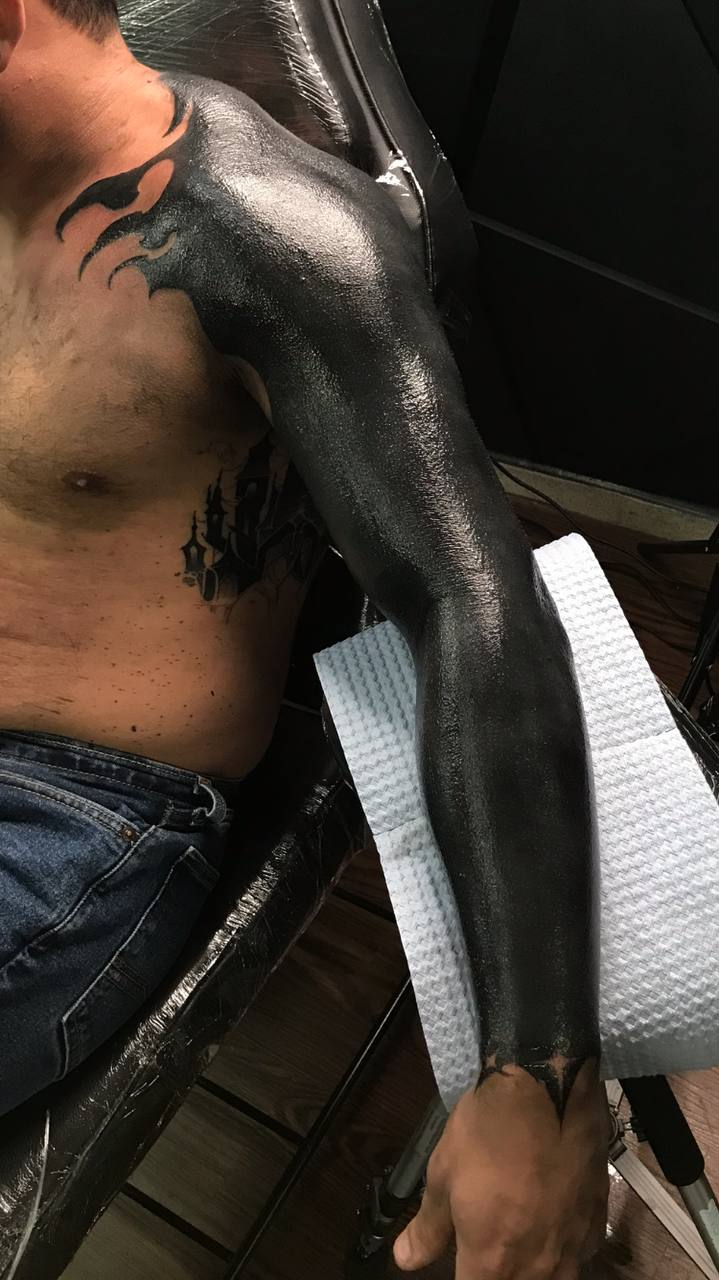
A blackout tattooed arm

Blackout tattoos are a type of tattoo that involves tattooing an area of the body completely black. Although many people get blackout tattoos as a standalone piece, they are also a method of covering up unwanted tattoos.

== History ==
Modern blackout tattoos are influenced by traditional Polynesian tattoos and graphic art. Their designs also often incorporate aspects of neo-tribal tattoos. The technique originated as an alternative method of covering up unwanted tattoos, instead of the more expensive tattoo removal. However, blackout tattoos became increasingly popular as an aesthetic choice in South Asia during the 2010s, a practice which largely derived from local tattooing techniques such as Bornean traditional tattooing. They soon spread internationally as a fashion trend, having been popularized by Singaporean tattoo artist Chester Lee whose designs got attention on Instagram after a picture of a woman with black chest and sleeve went viral in early 2016.

== Characteristics ==
The main and defining characteristics of blackout tattooing is tattooing a portion of skin completely solid black. These tattoos often have abstract geometric designs.

Blacking out a portion of skin can take several hours, as the artist needs to ensure that the tattoo ink is evenly deposited, while also minimising scarring. Blackout tattoos are sometimes completed in multiple sessions because the process may be painful and time-consuming, and to ensure that ink has fully saturated the skin. As the ink fades, blackout tattoos may need to be retouched, although some people choose to let them fade with age. If the technique is not applied properly, the ink may heal unevenly, with some areas lighter or darker than others.

The edges of the blackout tattoo may end in shading, or with designs that make use of the negative space between the tattoo and the bare skin tone. Blackout tattoos may also be used as a background for color or black-on-black patterns and designs. In some cases, designs in white ink are placed on top of blackout tattoos after they have healed to create visual contrast. Scarification is sometimes used on top of blackout tattoos. This provides a similar effect to white ink tattoos without the risk of fading.

== Health effects ==
Blackout tattoos have associated health risks, including health risks associated with tattooing in general. Because they cover a large area of skin, blackout tattoos tend to cause increased swelling, as well as risk of keloid scarring and infection.

The dark pigments typically used to create blackout tattoos often contain carcinogens such as benzo(a)pyrene, and toxic ingredients such as titanium dioxide, chromium, nickel and lead, which can cause allergic reactions when used over a large area. Large blackout tattoos may also make it difficult for dermatologists to perform cancer screenings, as it obscures possible signs of cancer such as abnormal moles and melanoma. The iron oxide used in black ink can also interfere with magnetic resonance imaging (MRI) exams.
