= Chest reconstruction =

Surgical procedure

Male chest reconstruction
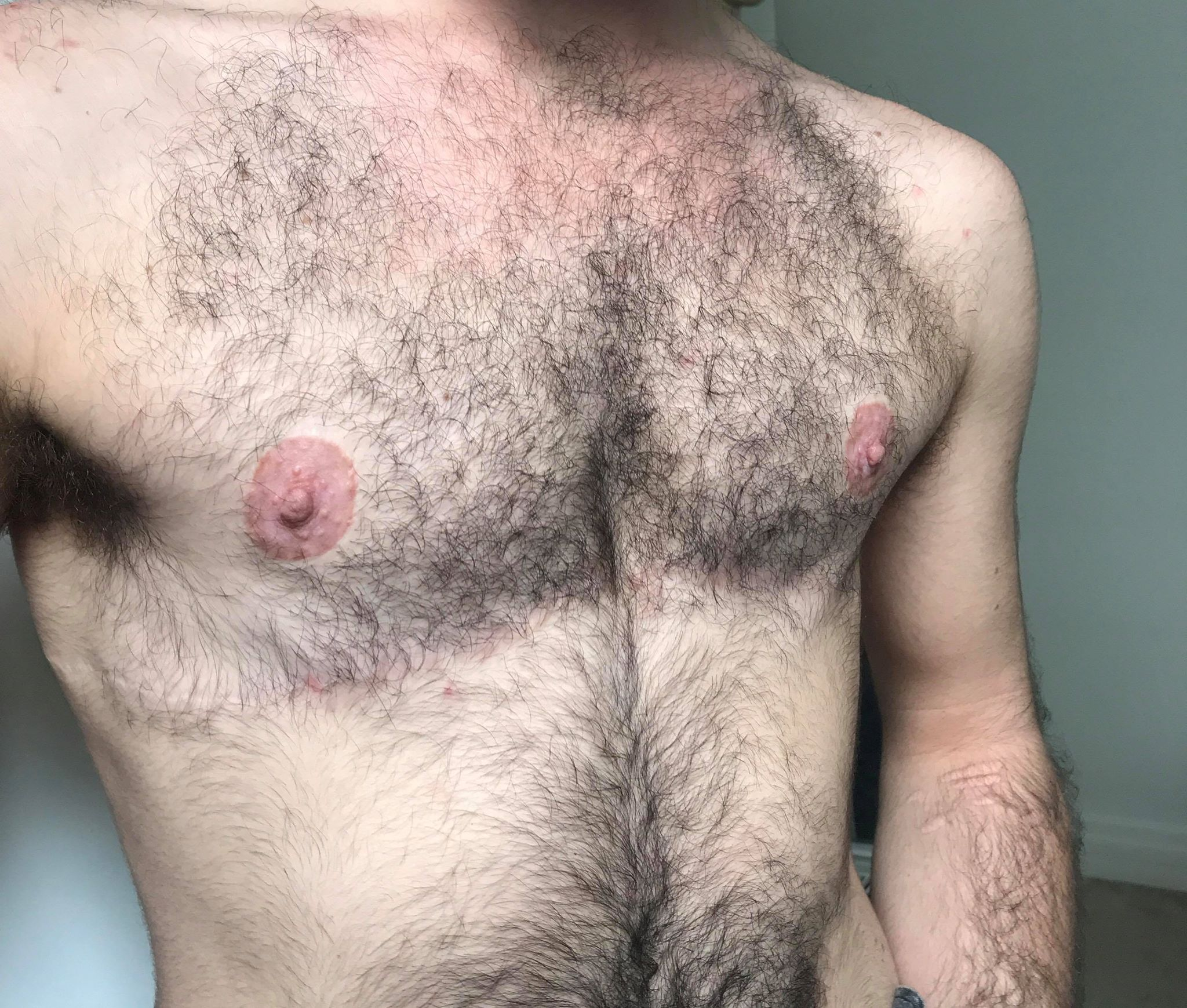
- Transgender man with healed double incision chest reconstruction, 2020
- ICD-9-CM: 85

Chest reconstruction, also known as top surgery, refers to any of various surgical procedures to reconstruct the chest by removing breast tissue or altering the nipples and areolae in order to mitigate gender dysphoria. Transgender men and non-binary people may pursue chest reconstruction as part of their transition and it is also used to treat cases of gynecomastia in cisgender men.

The removal of breast tissue in chest reconstruction is a type of mastectomy called a subcutaneous (under the skin) mastectomy. This type of mastectomy removes tissue from inside the breast (subcutaneous tissue), as well as excess skin. The surgeon then contours the chest, altering the size and position of the areolae and nipples as needed or as indicated by the patient.

Those undergoing chest reconstruction may opt to forgo nipple grafts, with the intent of having a completely blank, flat chest, or to have them tattooed on at a later date.

== History ==
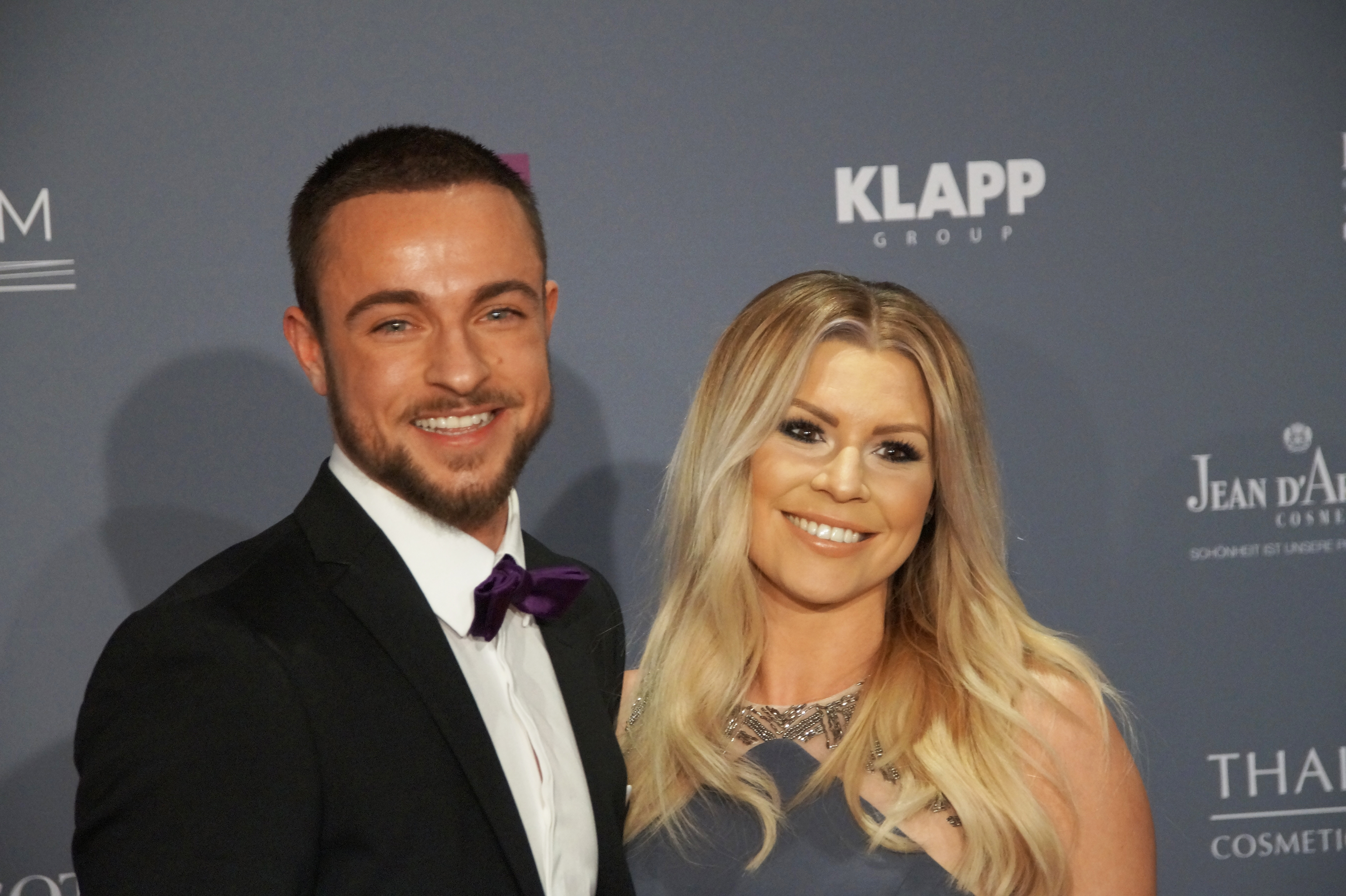
German model Benjamin Melzer (left) has called top surgery the "most important surgery for all trans men".

In 1942, British physician and author Michael Dillon underwent a chest masculinizing mastectomy as part of his transition to male. This would be among the first of Dillon's 13 gender-affirming surgeries. All were performed by Harold Gillies, a New Zealand plastic surgeon, who is sometimes referred to as "the father of modern plastic surgery." It is possible this was the first top surgery performed.

In the mid-1970s, Chicago surgeon Michael Brownstein (having graduated from UCSF) opened a plastic surgery practise in San Francisco. In 1978, Michael Brownstein conducted his first chest reconstructive surgery under the request of a FTM (Female to Male) identified as "John L." The surgery was successful, and shortly thereafter, "FTMs were 'flocking to him,' including some who had not had any so-called gender counseling." Brownstein continued to provide the plastic surgery until healthcare misconduct defense attorney Paul Walker contacted him, stating that he was violating the Standards of Care. Following this, Brownstein requested referrals from trans patients and Brownstein became known for his "outstanding results." Brownstein became a "world renowned" surgeon, with patients including Lou Sullivan in 1980 and Chaz Bono in 2009. Brownstein retired in 2013, "after 35 years of serving the transgender and gender-non-conforming communities."

Since these first surgeries, surgical practice has evolved significantly. While early surgical procedures resembled breast reduction surgeries, these often fell short of transgender patients' masculinization goals. The shift toward subcutaneous mastectomy procedures has allowed for superior male chest contouring, and better management of excess skin.

=== Top surgery as gender affirming care ===
In the U.S., the adoption of chest reconstruction as a commonly accessible part of gender transition is largely a 21st century phenomenon. A 2009 report by the Human Rights campaign cited a number of contemporaneous insurance policies with clauses explicitly excluding gender affirming care, as well as 2003 report that found that nearly a third of transgender people studied had experienced discrimination in obtaining healthcare, including in obtaining health insurance. Prior to the passage of the Affordable Care Act in 2010, gender dysphoria could be treated as a "pre-existing condition", for which insurance plans could deny coverage. Since then, coverage has varied significantly between states and between insurance plans.

In 2014, the Department of Health and Human Services overturned the ban on Medicare coverage for gender affirming surgeries. This likely accounted for the dramatic rise in top surgeries and gender affirming care consultations in general that immediately followed.

In 2019, a group of plastic surgeons issued a letter condemning insurance coverage denials for free nipple grafts, which had become more common. A 2020 analysis later found generally inconsistent coverage between different diagnostic codes for top surgery, multiple of which are often needed.

As of 2026, there are ongoing attempts by Republicans to limit access to gender affirming care, including surgeries, and a 2025 report by the AMA finds that 55% of patients seeking out gender affirming surgery in the past year were denied coverage.

== Patients ==
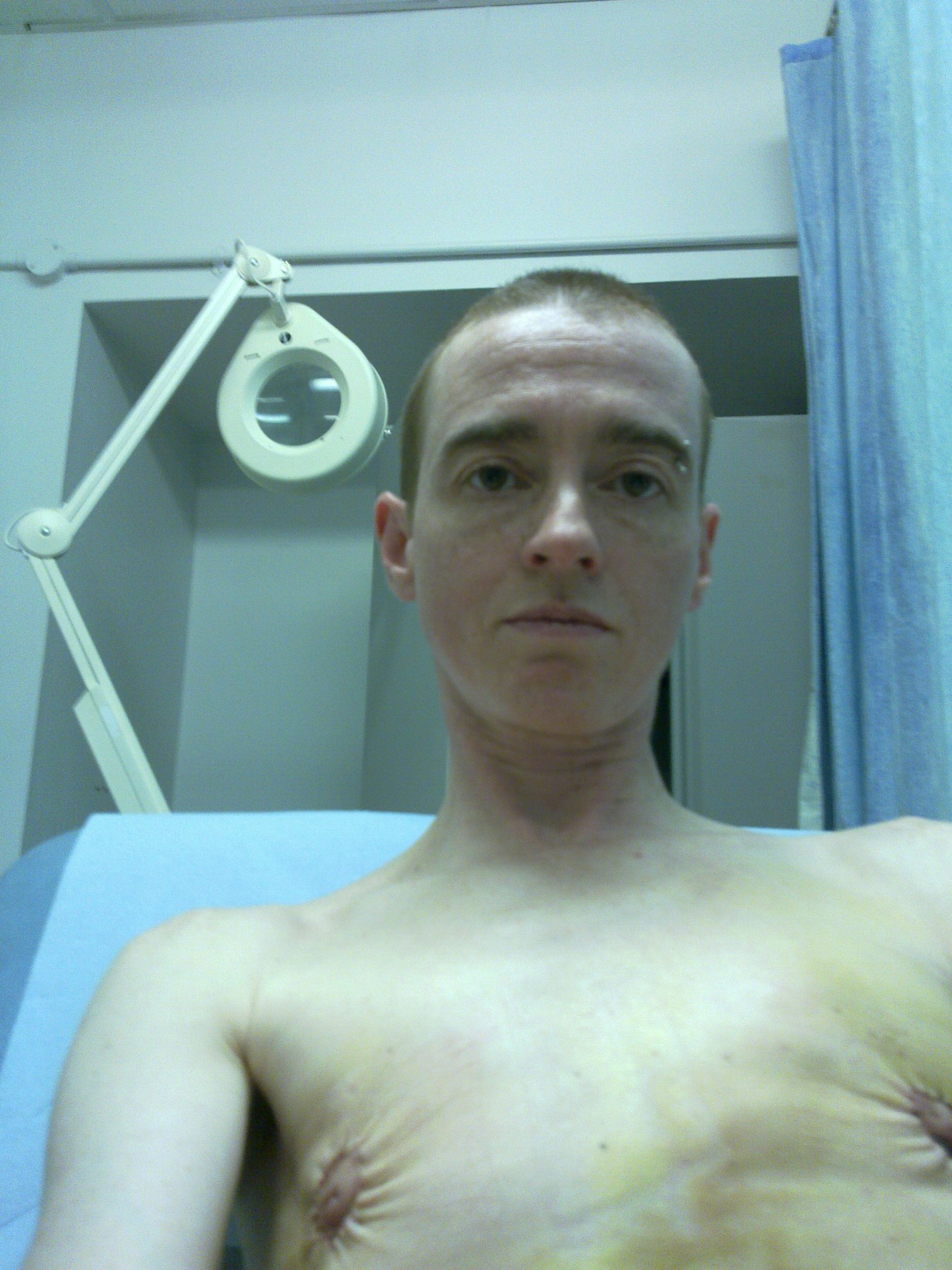
A patient six days after having top surgery

Chest reconstruction surgery candidates desire a flat chest, which may or may not include masculinization. These candidates may include cisgender men with gynecomastia; transgender men who are medically transitioning and have chest dysphoria; and non-binary people with breasts.

In cisgender men, gynecomastia is a common breast deformity characterized by additional breast tissue, which may require surgical intervention. Causes of gynecomastia may vary but may include drug side effects or genetics.

In both cisgender men and people assigned female at birth with male, masculine, or non-binary genders, their breast tissue may cause gender dysphoria, or distress associated with the inconsistency between one's gender and one's physical appearance. Conversely, after surgery, patients may experience relief or joy from the appearance of their chest matching their gender, which is called gender euphoria. Chest reconstruction also removes the need for chest binding, which can be painful or inconvenient for some people, and can lead to chronic health issues if done frequently for a long period of time. For this reason, chest reconstruction is considered the primary gender-affirming surgery for transgender men, and is often the only surgical intervention they seek out.

In transgender patients in certain places, undergoing gender affirming surgery such as chest reconstruction may be necessary to change their gender on legal documents.

== Indications ==
=== Transgender people ===
Patients seeking chest reconstruction as part of their gender transition typically have to meet eligibility requirements related to the progress of their transition in order to get surgery. One common requirement is for the patient to have been on gender affirming hormone replacement therapy (HRT), in this case, testosterone for a sufficient length of time. Another common requirement is that patients have a letter of support from a mental health professional, confirming that the patient is in a sound state of mind to choose to have surgery and that surgery is in the best interest of the patient. Patients may also be required to have lived as their experienced gender (rather than their birth sex) for a certain length of time.

The World Professional Association for Transgender Health (WPATH)'s most recent clinical protocol, as of 2022, are that 6 months on HRT and no more than one letter from a qualified mental health professional be required for surgery. Previous recommendations required two letters of recommendation for gender-affirming surgery, at least one of which had to be from a mental health professional experienced in diagnosing gender identity disorder (now recognized as gender dysphoria), who had known the patient for over a year.

In the United States, these requirements would come from the patient's health insurance. Not all insurance plans cover gender affirming surgery, and insurance coverage of it has improved over time. Multiple medical organizations, including the American Medical Association, the American Psychological Association, and the National Association of Social Workers have issued statements that failing to cover gender affirming surgeries is a form of discrimination.

==== Transgender minors ====
Gender-affirming surgery is generally not performed on children under 18, though in rare cases may be performed on adolescents if health care providers agree there is an unusual benefit to doing so or risk to not performing it. Preferred treatments for children include puberty blockers and gender affirming hormone therapy, which reduces the need for future surgery by preventing breast growth.

=== Cisgender people ===
Chest reconstruction surgery is not the primary treatment for gynecomastia in cisgender men, but is considered highly effective. For sufficiently severe gynecomastia that has persisted for longer than six months, primary treatment may involve treatment of underlying causes or medication with selective estrogen receptor modulators (SERMs) such as tamoxifen, raloxifene, and clomifene or aromatase inhibitors (AIs) such as anastrozole, though these are not currently approved for gynecomastia by the U.S. Food and Drug Administration.

In 2019, 24,123 male patients underwent surgical treatment for gynecomastia in the United States. Thirty-five percent of those patients were between the ages of 20 and 29, and 60% were younger than age 29 at the time of the operation. At an average surgeon's fee of $4,123, gynecomastia surgery was also the 11th most costly male cosmetic surgery of 2019.

==== Cisgender minors ====
Gynecomastia is very common in adolescents, with incidence peaking around 13-14. However, in 75–90% of adolescents, it resolves on its own, and by age 17, only 10% will still have gynecomastia. As such, in adolescent males, it is recommended that surgery be postponed until puberty is completed.

== Procedures ==
A variety of procedures may be used for chest masculinization, depending on the patient's native anatomy and goals for surgery. Unlike in typical mastectomy or breast reduction, many patients prioritize flatness or masculinization over the preservation of function or sensation. Thus, many surgical procedures for chest masculinization aim to optimize the removal of breast tissue and maximize control over the appearance of the nipple-areolar complex, while minimizing visible scarring.

Depending on the patient's chest size, the degree of excess skin, skin elasticity, and the position of the nipple-areolar complex (NAC), surgeons most commonly choose between three procedures: double incision with free nipple grafts, periareolar, and keyhole surgical approaches. However, many variants of these exist, depending on the patient's goals. This decision-making process is particularly relevant for transgender patients, who are more likely to have ptosis, excess skin, or skin of poor quality due to the binding of their breast tissue.

=== Double incision ===
One of the most common chest reconstructive procedures, double incision involves an incision above and below the breast mass, the removal of the fatty and glandular tissue, and the closure of the skin. This method leaves scars along the bottom contour of the pectoral muscles, stretching from the underarms to the medial pectoral. Double incision is usually accompanied by free nipple grafts to make male-looking nipples, resulting in a second set of scars around the areola.

Double incision surgery is more common than other procedures because it can be performed on the widest range of breast sizes and on skin with poor elasticity, and particularly for patients with larger breasts, free nipple grafts may offer greater control over final appearance than other methods.

==== Free nipple grafts ====
Free nipple grafts fully remove then reattach the areola. The areola and nipple are removed from the breast tissue, cutting away along the circumference and removing the top layer of flesh from the rest of the tissue. After the chest has been reconstructed, the nipples are grafted on, allowing for a more typical male nipple position. The areolae are often sized down as well as the nipples themselves, as female areolae are often larger in circumference and the nipples protrude farther. Some patients may also request specific shapes for the nipples that will be reattached.

Following surgery, nipple grafts come with the risk of rejection. In such cases, the nipple is often tattooed back on cosmetically or further surgical procedures may be applied. Sensation typically returns to the grafted nipples over time. However, since the procedure severs the nerves that go into the nipple-areola, recipients may experience complete or partial loss of sensation.

=== Limited incision approaches ===
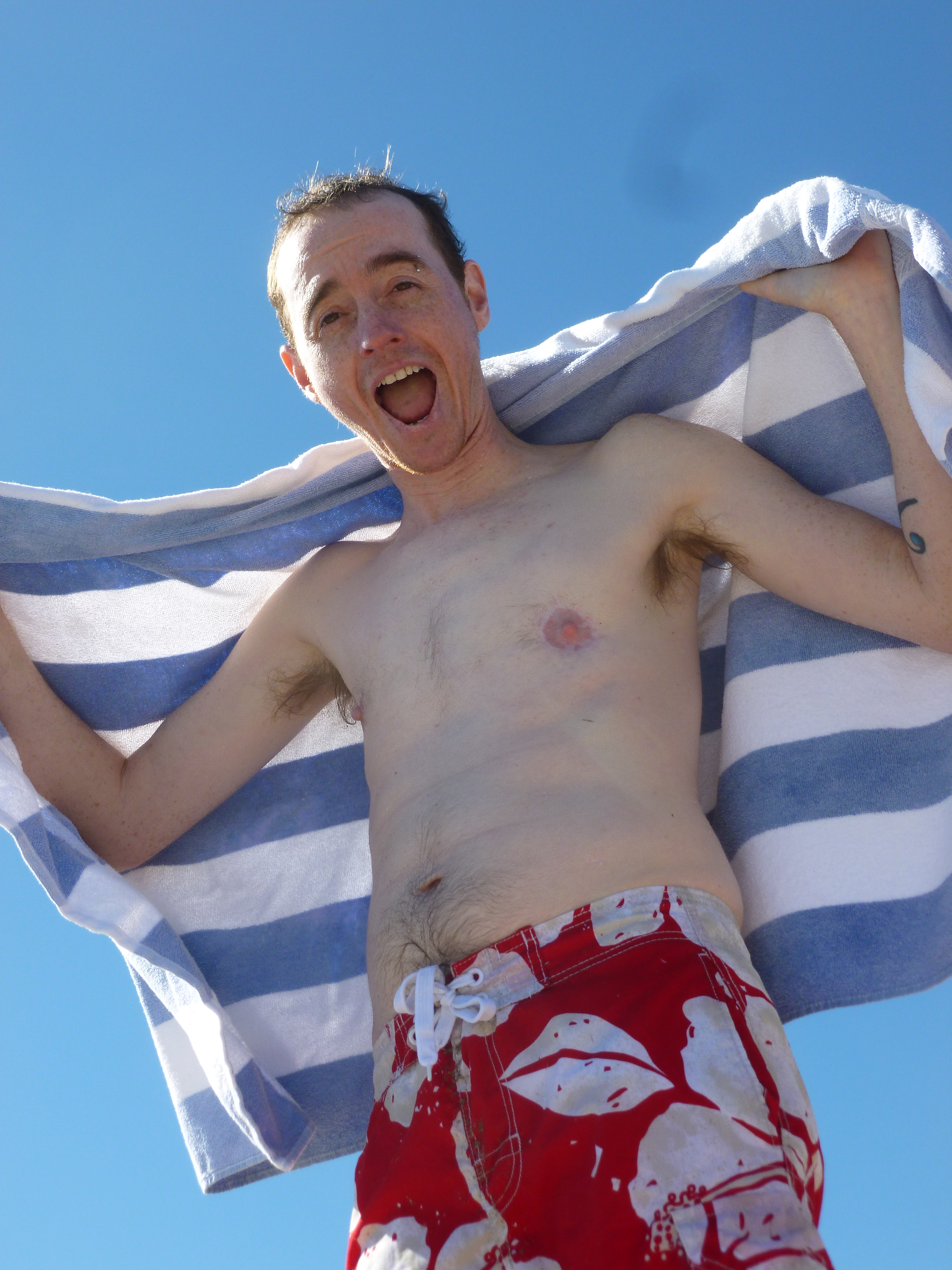
A transgender man 4 years after keyhole top surgery, 2014.

For small breasts with high skin elasticity, a peri-areolar incision can be performed. A peri-areolar incision refers to circular incision around the areola, combined with an inner circular incision to remove some of the excess areola. Drawing the skin into the center will result in some puckering, but this often smooths out with time. There will be significant tension on the scar line, and to prevent spreading of the scar, a permanent fixation suture is needed. Leaving outer dermis (raw skin) underneath the marginalized areola helps in its survival.

The keyhole incision (i.e., skeleton key) augments the periareolar incision further by making a vertical closure underneath (lollipop), which results after the unwanted skin is pulled in from side to side and the excess is removed.

An anchor incision adds to that a transverse incision usually in the infra mammary fold to further remove excessive skin. Draping or blousing is not desirable. This is reserved for much larger breasts or topographically a larger surface area, as seen in women with postpartum breast atrophy.

The nipple areolar complex may be supported by a pedicle, leaving some sensation and blood supply intact. However, this approach may come at the cost of flatness.

=== Inverted "T" ===
A transverse inframammary incision with free nipple areolar grafts is another approach. If there is too much blousing of the skin, the alternatives are to extend the incision laterally ("chasing a dog ear") or to make a vertical midline incision (inverted T).

As with double incision, for the free nipple grafts, the areola is trimmed to an agreed upon diameter and the nipple sectioned with a pie-shaped excision and reconstituted.

== Recovery and complications ==
Recovery from chest reconstruction typically takes six to eight weeks, the first week of which is closely monitored to avoid surgical complications such as hematoma, seroma, infection and rejection. The rates of these complications vary depending on the procedure used, but are generally under 5%, with nipple-grafting procedures being associated with fewer overall complications. In order to minimize fluid buildup, patients are instructed to use a chest compression vest for 4 to 6 weeks; and sometimes drains, which are removed after a week. To minimize the risk of scar hypertrophy, patients are typically advised not to lift heavy weights overhead for four to six weeks.

After recovery, some patients will require surgical revision, most commonly related to excess tissue near the lateral ends of inframammary incisions, called "dog ears". The rejection of the nipple and the development of keloid or hypertrophic scars also commonly require surgical revision.

=== "Dog ear" ===
Occasionally, the side limbs may be quite long, and the expression doctors use is "chasing a dog ear" into the axilla (or underarm). A dog ear may occur when the skin at the edge or corner of an incision 'flows over,' when there is too much gathering, usually at an angle greater than 30 degrees. This usually becomes more apparent after several months of healing, and can be caused by things like weight gain or due to 'poor surgical planning and execution.' It is also more common in patients with obesity. Using a curved incision can reduce the chances of dog ears developing because it requires less gathering of skin to be done, but some patients dislike the appearance of the curved scar as it can mimic the appearance of breasts.

Not uncommonly, a surgeon may revise the incision lines after 3 or more months of settling shows some residual problem areas. Other revisions may include changing 'slight irregularities,' such as reshaping of the nipple that may have stretched 'out of shape' due to too much upper arm/over the head arm movement, or general 'overextension' during the healing process (which may also cause asymmetry), bulges or puckering (typically along incision lines), failed nipple grafts (which may result in one or both nipples 'failing' to 'take' to the patient's healing chest), or scarring patterns a patient may not be happy with.

== Culture ==
In 2017, German model Benjamin Melzer called top surgery "the most important surgery for all trans men". It was one of the 11 surgeries he had during his own transition. Right after his healing process was over, Melzer went to a public pool and jumped into the water with just shorts on, which he described as "the best".

Canadian actor Elliot Page underwent the surgery circa March 2021; he stated, "It has completely transformed my life... [It's] not only life-changing but lifesaving."

Within the transgender community, scars resulting from top surgery, particularly double incision, are also commonly treated as a visual representation of trans-masculine identity, both as a source of gender euphoria and as a potential reason to be "clocked" and targeted by transphobia.

== See also ==
- Subcutaneous tissue
- List of transgender-related topics
- Sex reassignment therapy
- Transgender history
