= Benjamin Melzer =

German model and activist

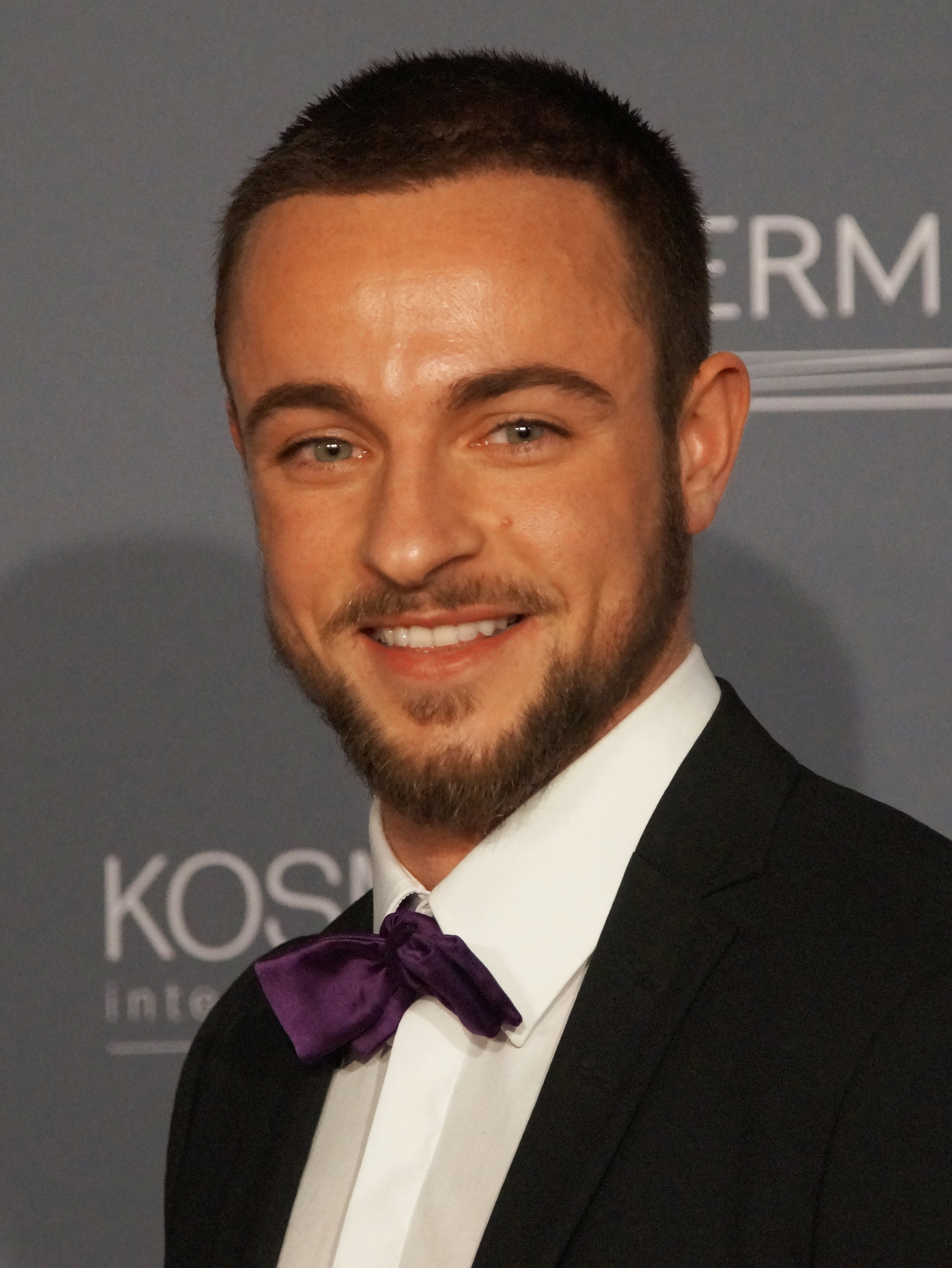
- Melzer in 2016
- Born: January 20, 1987 (age 39); Recklinghausen, Germany
- Known for: Modeling, transgender activism
- Height: 5' 10'

Benjamin Ryan Melzer is a German model, transgender activist, and blogger.

He has modeled in German magazines Der Tagesspiegel, Frankfurter Allgemeine Zeitung, Der Spiegel, and Focus.

In April 2016, he became the first transgender man in Europe to appear on the cover of a men's fitness magazine. This was the European edition of Men's Health.

== Biography ==
Melzer was born and raised in Oer-Erkenschwick, a suburb 40 minutes's commute from Düsseldorf.

In 2016, he starred in a modeling shoot for Diesel and About You alongside Dutch model and trans woman Loiza Lamers.

The same year, he starred in PETA's "I'd rather go naked than wear fur" campaign alongside Lamers.

=== Gender transition ===
Mezler stated that he knew there was "something special" about himself at 3 years of age, but lacked information to classify this as childhood gender dysphoria. After watching a documentary film about transgender actor Chaz Bono when Melzer was 18, he realized he had been experiencing gender dysphoria.

Five years later, at age 23, he decided to begin his medical transition, which included masculinizing hormone therapy and 11 surgeries. His entire family was supportive, including his 89-year-old grandmother, and his mother, who came to the clinic every day to bring him food as he recovered. He has called top surgery "the most important surgery for all trans men"; right after his healing process was over, he went to a public pool and jumped into the water with just shorts on, which he described as "the best".

Mezler and his previous female partners have always identified as straight. He has dated his fiancé Zara from at least 2010 to 2017; Zara had always seen him as a man, even prior to his medical transition.

Regarding his satisfaction after his transition, he stated, "I'm totally comfortable now and I listen and try to understand things more. I've calmed down and feel very, very different...I don't think I have to prove anything. Look at me, I'm happy and I have a girlfriend. I just live my life".

He has criticized the way trans people are portrayed on German TV, describing their appearances as "a little freaky, over the top or completely depressed". He stated, "I want to show the world that I'm just a normal guy who happens to be trans".

=== Personal life ===
Melzer's hobbies include surfing, wakeboarding, and cliff jumping.

He lived in Munich, but more recently resides in Recklinghausen.

One of his goals is to make the modeling business more accessible to transgender models. He also expressed a desire to star in a Calvin Klein commercial.

He married German model Sissi Marie Melzer (née Hofbauer) in 2023.

== See also ==
- Transgender rights in Germany
- Transgender history
- Fashion
