= Medical tattoo =

Type of tattooing

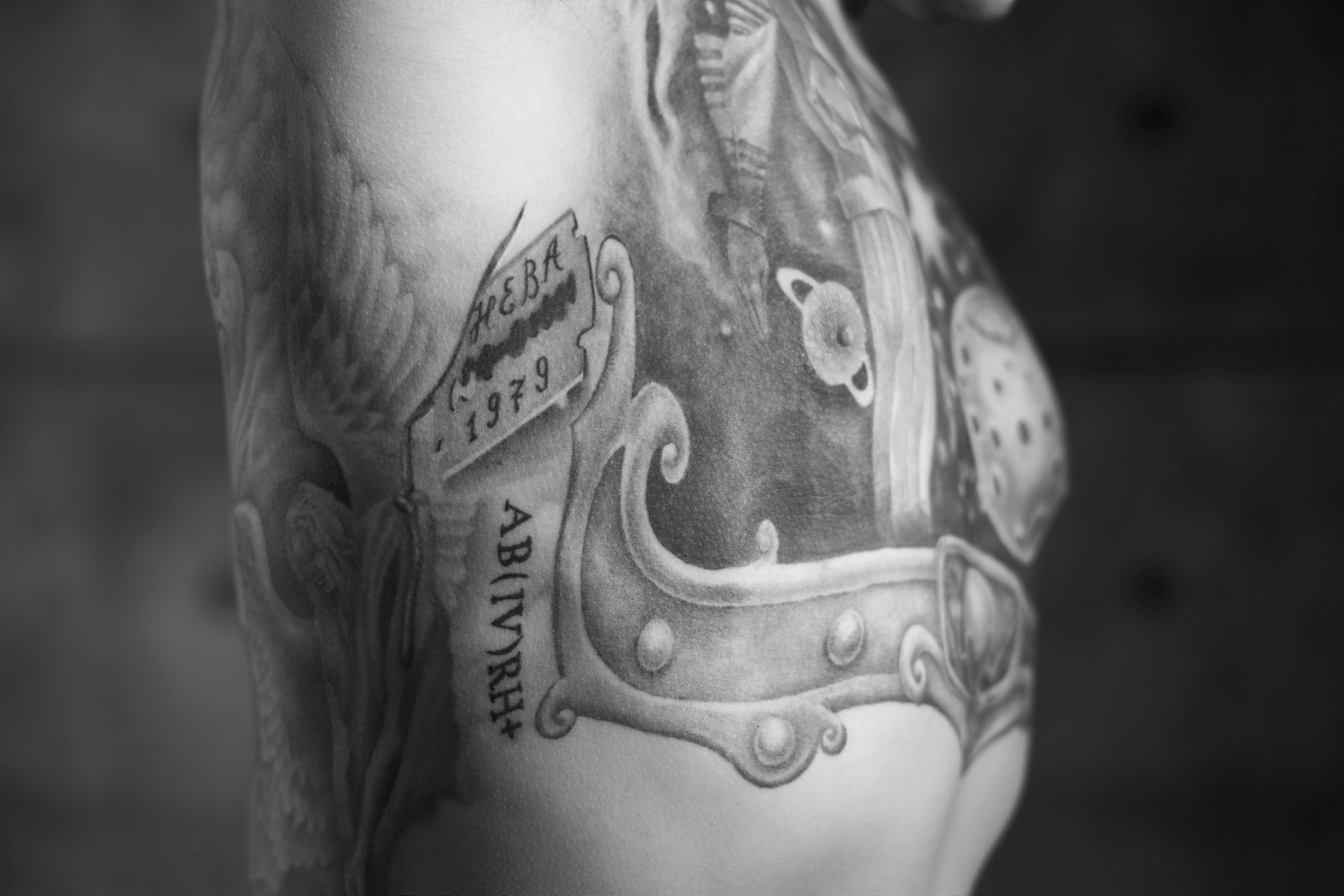
Medical tattoo: blood type (below razor blade)

A medical tattoo is a tattoo used to treat a condition, communicate medical information, or mark a body location for treatment. People may get a paramedical tattoo to conceal a condition or the effects of treatment, such as creating the appearance of an areola after breast reconstruction, or a cover-up tattoo to disguise the area in an artistic way.

== Historical uses ==
Ötzi, a man who lived between 3350 and 3105 BC and whose remains were found near the Austria–Italy border, had tattoos over his joints that may have been part of pain relief treatments similar to acupuncture.

A crude practice of corneal tattooing was performed by the Greek physician Galen in 150 CE. He tried to cover leucomatous opacities of the cornea by cauterizing the surface with a heated stilet and applying powdered nutgalls and iron or pulverized pomegranate bark mixed with copper salt. With the rise of Christianity, tattooing declined and eventually became banned by a papal edict in 787 CE.

In 1835, a German doctor named Pauli used mercury sulfide and white lead to tattoo over skin lesions including nevi and purple plaque. Another doctor in the 1850s used mercury sulfide after plastic surgery of the lip. The practice of corneal tattooing was revived by Louis de Wecker in the 1870s. Tattooing of scarred lips with cinnabar began in 1911.

== To provide medical information ==
During the Cold War, threats of nuclear warfare led several U.S. states to consider blood type tattooing. Programs were spurred in Chicago, Utah and Indiana based on the premise that if an atomic bomb were to strike, the resulting damage would require extremely large amounts of blood within a short amount of time.

Similar to dog tags, members of the U.S. military may have their vital information tattooed on themselves, usually on the rib cage below the armpit; they are referred to as "meat tags".

Tattoos have also been used to provide notice to emergency personnel that a person has diabetes mellitus; people with this condition may fall into a diabetic coma and be unable to communicate that information. Medical alert jewelry, such as bracelets, are the most common way to provide this notice, but some people prefer tattoos due to the cost and inconvenience of losing or breaking jewelry. Because diabetes can impair wound healing, people with diabetes may need to carefully choose the location and timing of a medical tattoo.

People with a "Do Not Resuscitate order" might indicate the presence of this by a tattoed message on their chest.

== For radiation treatment ==
Tattoos have been used as fiducial markers as an aid in guiding radiotherapy. Typically these markers are tattooed in dark permanent ink, but ultraviolet tattoos, which are mostly invisible under normal light, have been studied as an alternative to minimize impact on patient body image. Scott Kelly used marker tattoos in the positioning of sonogram probes for multiple checks for atherosclerosis while on a long-duration mission on the International Space Station.

== Paramedical tattoos ==
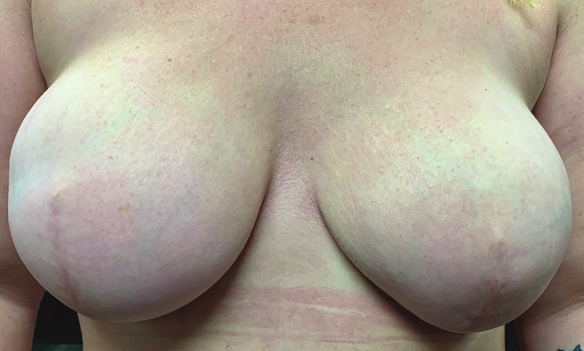
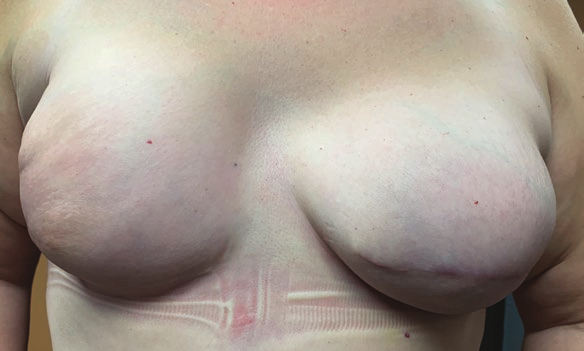
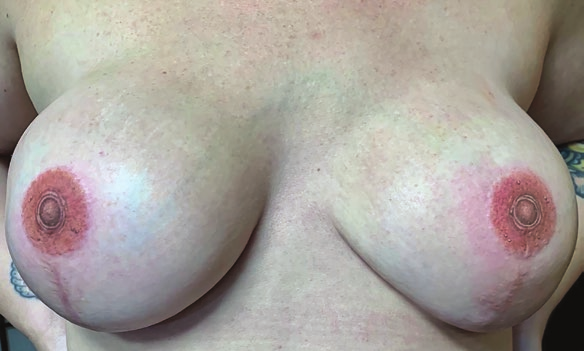
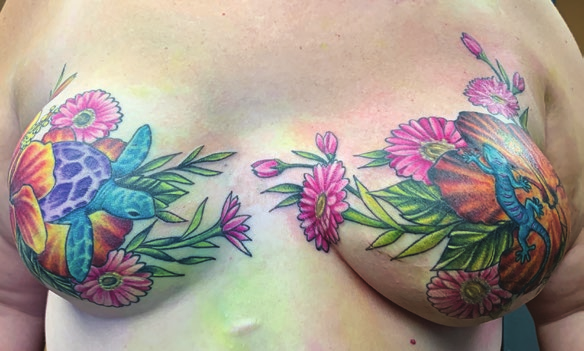
Tattoos over mastectomy scars may restore the appearance of removed nipples and areolas or may be decorative cover-ups.

A paramedical tattoo is a cosmetic tattoo applied to conceal a medical condition or to disguise the results of its treatment, typically in a realistic style. Alternatively, people with skin conditions or scars may choose to get a decorative cover-up tattoo with a piece of art over the area.

During breast surgeries, including breast reconstruction after mastectomy (removal of the breast for treatment of cancer), breast reduction surgery, and chest masculinization, tattooing is sometimes used to replace the areola which has been removed during mastectomy, or to fill in areas of pigment loss which may occur during breast reduction performed with a free nipple graft technique. Since September 2011, the Royal Derby Hospital offers free nipple tattoos for breast surgery patients in order to mask the scars of surgery. The purchase of the tattoo device was funded by the Ashbourne Breast Cancer Walk. Vinnie Myers of Little Vinnie's Tattoos in Finksburg, Maryland, has performed nipple tattoos on over 5,000 women who have undergone surgery for breast cancer, including those of Caitlin Kiernan, who wrote a story about Myers in The New York Times. A similar service offered without charge in 2017 by a cosmetic tattooist in the UK was booked up six months ahead. Another option some people choose after mastectomy is to get a decorative tattoo on the chest as body art instead of a reconstruction.

Other uses include simulating the appearance of fingernails and covering scars. Micropigmentation (permanent makeup) can be used to reduce the visibility of vitiligo areas on the skin.

Eyebrow enhancement tattoos such as microblading can provide benefits for individuals with medical conditions like alopecia or trichotillomania, providing a natural-looking restoration of eyebrows lost due to these conditions.

== See also ==
- SS blood group tattoo
