= Edith Mathiowitz =

Israeli American bioengineer

Edith Suzin Mathiowitz
- עידית (סוזין) מטיוביץ
- Education: Weizmann Institute of Science; Tel Aviv University
- Scientific career
- Workplaces: Brown University; Massachusetts Institute of Technology; Harvard Medical School
- Thesis: Polyamide microcapsules for photochemical and other controlled releases

Edith Mathiowitz עידית (סוזין) מטיוביץ (Hebrew) is an Israeli American bioengineer who is Professor of Pathology and Professor of Engineering at Brown University. She has focused her career on biomedicine and the development of polymers for drug delivery and tissue engineering. She is an elected Fellow of the American Institute for Medical and Biological Engineering.

== Early life and education ==
Mathiowitz was born in Israel. She earned her bachelor's degree in chemistry at Tel Aviv University. For her graduate studies, she studied physical chemistry at the Weizmann Institute of Science. She remained there as a doctoral researcher, where she studied polyamide microcapsules. She was a postdoctoral researcher with Robert S. Langer at the Massachusetts Institute of Technology. As a postdoctoral researcher she submitted several patent applications which have since been licensed to many start-ups, include injectable growth hormones and tattoo inks. She moved to Harvard Medical School for a two-year fellowship before joining the faculty at Brown University.

== Research and career ==
Mathiowitz develops polymer-based smart delivery systems for genes and drugs, as well as polymer systems for tissue engineering. Specifically, she is interested in how chemical structure can be used to control biochemical interactions, increase retention time and cross biological barriers. She has spent much of her career at Brown University, where she was Director of the Graduate Program in Biotechnology.

Mathiowitz has created bioadhesive polymers that enhance interactions with intestinal mucosa. Her bioadhesive polymers achieve these specific interactions by inducing secondary bonds and prolonging 'dwelling time' compared to other oral dosages. She has also developed biodegradable nanoparticles that can be chemically engineered to penetrate mucosal barriers and deliver biological components (e.g. through the use of hydrophobic polymers with carboxylic acid), as cancer vaccines, and to deliver peptides and proteins. Her research has inspired at least four biotechnology companies, including Spherics and Perosphere.

Mathiowitz's research also encompasses new types of vascular treatment for bloodstream infections.

== Awards and honors ==
- 1997 Elected Fellow of the American Institute for Medical and Biological Engineering
- 2013 Elected Member of the National Academy of Inventors
- 2015 Elected Fellow of the Controlled Release Society

== Selected publications ==
- Edith Mathiowitz; Jules S. Jacob; Yong S. Jong; et al. (1 March 1997). "Biologically erodable microspheres as potential oral drug delivery systems". Nature. 386 (6623): 410–414. doi:10.1038/386410a0. ISSN 1476-4687. PMID 9121559. Wikidata Q34423490.
- Kathleen J. Pekarek; Jules S. Jacob; Edith Mathiowitz (1 January 1994). "Double-walled polymer microspheres for controlled drug release". Nature. 367 (6460): 258–260. doi:10.1038/367258a0. ISSN 1476-4687. PMID 8121490. Wikidata Q59089415.
- Gerardo P Carino; Edith Mathiowitz (1 February 1999). "Oral insulin delivery". Advanced Drug Delivery Reviews. 35 (2–3): 249–257. doi:10.1016/s0169-409x(98)00075-1. ISSN 0169-409X. PMID 10837700. Wikidata Q73850457.
