= Kirby–Desai Scale =

Predictive scoring system

- Purpose: Predicts the number of laser sessions required for tattoo removal

The Kirby–Desai Scale is a predictive scoring system used in dermatology to estimate the number of laser sessions required to remove a tattoo.

== History ==
William Kirby and Alpesh Desai developed the scale while working at a specialized tattoo removal clinic in Beverly Hills, California, after observing variations in treatment duration among patients. They conducted a retrospective analysis of 100 patient cases treated between 2004 and 2008, discovering a strong statistical correlation (r=0.757; p<0.001) between their proposed scoring system and the actual number of sessions needed for clearance. Their findings were published in The Journal of Clinical & Aesthetic Dermatology in March 2009.

== Scoring system ==
The Kirby–Desai Scale aggregates six variables, each scored on an ordinal scale. Fair skin phototypes, proximal body sites, black monochromatic ink, sparse pigment, unscarred skin and single-layer tattoos receive low points, while darker phototypes, distal extremities, multicolored or highly saturated ink, scarring and layered or cover-up work add progressively higher points. In the original algorithm the sum of the six values approximated the number of recommended laser sessions, with an error margin of roughly ±2.5 treatments.
