= Tattoo ink =

Ink used for tattoos

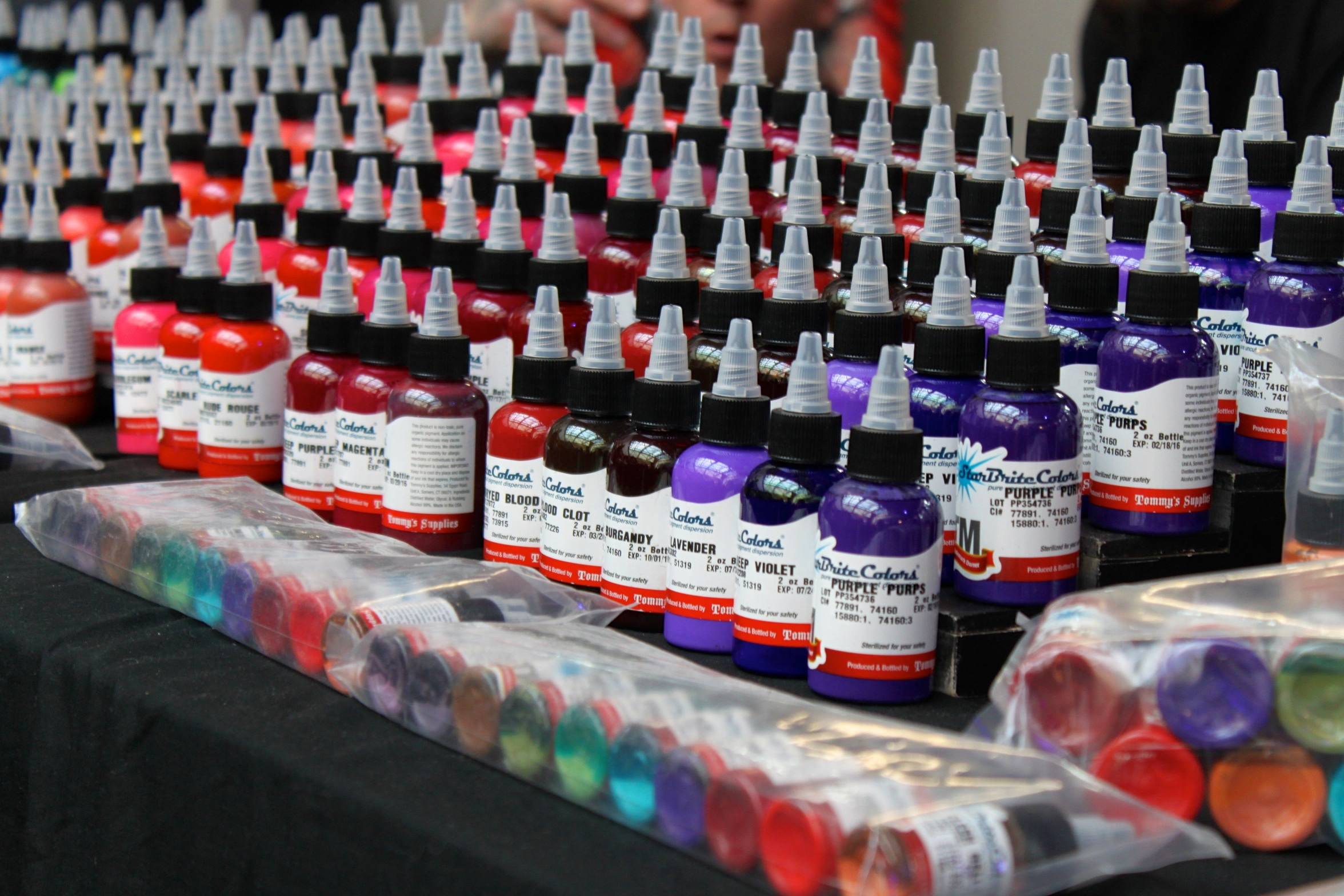
Bottles of tattoo ink

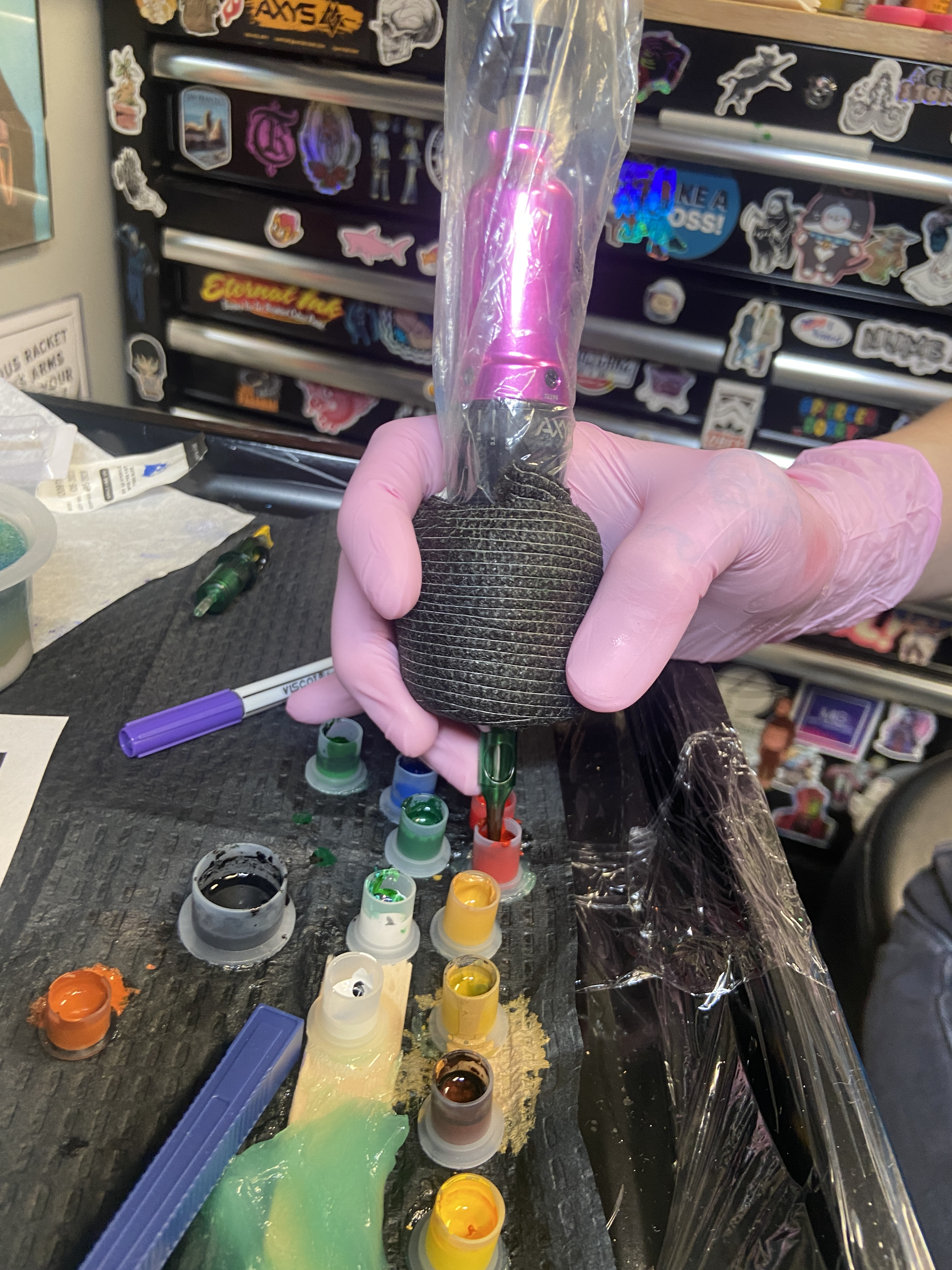
Tattoo artist loading a rotary tattoo machine needle tip with ink

Tattoo inks consist of pigments combined with a carrier, used in the process of tattooing to create a tattoo in the skin. These inks are also used for permanent makeup, a form of tattoo.

Professional tattoo inks are available in many colors and use a wide variety of pigments, including inorganic pigments, such as carbon black, and synthetic organic pigments, such as brightly colored azo-chemicals. Commercial manufacturers combine pigments with carriers such as ethyl alcohol or distilled water to create liquid inks. They may include preservatives to reduce risk of contamination and other additives to adjust the viscosity of the ink.

Pigments and preservatives in tattoo ink can cause allergic reactions in skin. A portion of pigment applied in a tattoo may migrate to other places in the body, such as lymph nodes. Some common tattoo pigments are chemicals that may cause cancer, but long-term studies would be needed to determine whether these chemicals increase risk of cancer if embedded in the skin.

The European Union has started to prohibit use of certain pigments in tattoo inks out of safety concerns. In the United States, tattoo inks are subject to regulation by the U.S. Food and Drug Administration (FDA), which generally does not investigate commercial inks unless it receives complaints about specific safety issues, such as contamination. The FDA has not specifically approved any pigments for cosmetic tattoos.

Tattooing is an ancient practice, and archeologists have found evidence of tattoos made with soot among people in multiple continents thousands of years ago. Especially since the invention of the electric tattoo machine in the 1890s, tattoo artists have experimented with many chemicals to identify durable pigments that can produce a range of colors without causing bad reactions, often testing inks in their own skin.

Most tattoo inks are intended to be permanent, but there are commercial methods for creating semi-permanent tattoos. There are also traditions of temporary tattoos, including mehndi, applied to the surface of the skin using henna and other dyes.

== Components of professional inks ==
Tattoo inks are available in a range of colors that can be thinned or mixed together to produce other colors and shades. Most professional tattoo artists purchase inks pre-made (known as predispersed inks), while some artists mix their own using a dry pigment and a carrier.

In the United States, tattoo ink manufacturers are not required to reveal their ingredients, or to prove that a voluntarily published ingredients list is accurate. Their recipes may be proprietary. Tattoo inks from different manufacturers vary widely in formulation, quality, and safety.

=== Pigments ===
Tattoo inks are pigments, i.e. very fine powdered colorants, in a water-based liquid. Many of these pigments are also used in artist's paints, textiles, automotive paint, or for printer's ink. Most inks are organic compounds, such as azo dyes and pigments, including monoazo, disazo, indigoid, and oxazine pigments. Some inks also often contain heavy metals. Pigments can be small bits of solids or discrete molecules, such as titanium dioxide or iron oxide.

Color	Pigments
Black	May contain: Carbon black, usually a main component of black ink; Iron oxides, such as magnetite and wustite, along with nickel from impurities in iron oxides
White	May contain: Titanium dioxide; Zinc; These have mostly replaced more toxic pigments such as barium sulphate and white lead.
Red	May contain: Cadmium sulphide or cadmium selenide; Iron oxides or ferric hydrate (red ochre); Mercury sulfide, known as cinnabar and vermilion (although this ingredient has generally been phased out of use); Azo compounds; Quinacridone
Orange	Can be considered a shade of red. May contain azo compounds, such as Pigment Orange 13.
Yellow	May contain: Cadmium sulphide; Azo compounds, including monoazo yellow; Pigments used for white ink, to brighten the yellow color
Green	May contain: Cobalt or chromium oxide; Pthalocyanine green, known as phthalo green; A mix of cobalt and lead chromate (chrome yellow)
Blue	May contain: Cobalt, such as cobalt aluminium oxides, known as cobalt blue; Copper phthalocyanine, known as phthalo blue; Nickel
Purple	May contain: Cobalt; Manganese
Brown	May contain iron oxides, such as ochre

Other elements found in trace amounts in some ink include antimony, arsenic, beryllium, selenium, and aluminium. Titanium dioxide is slightly abrasive and can cause microscopic bits of nickel and chromium to wear off tattoo needles and get into the skin.

Tattoo ink manufacturers often blend metal pigments and/or use lightening agents (such as lead or titanium) to reduce production costs. Tattoo inks contaminated with metal allergens have been known to cause severe allergenic reactions, sometimes years later, when the original ink is not available for testing.

==== Blacklight ink ====
Blacklight tattoo ink does not glow in the dark, but reacts to non-visible UV light, producing a visible glow by fluorescence. A typical blacklight ink formula includes microspheres of polymethylmethacrylate (PMMA) containing fluorescent dye. This ink may cause irritation and inflammation, and tattoo artists are divided on whether they consider it safe to use.

==== Glow in the dark ink ====
Glow-in-the-dark tattoos absorbs and retains light, and then glows in darkened conditions by process of phosphorescence. This uses typically silica encapsulated strontium and calcium aluminates, but sometimes phosphate passivated versions are used. These are considered nontoxic.

=== Carrier ===
A water-soluble carrier solution flows the water-insoluble pigment from the point of needle insertion (typically using a tattoo machine) into the surrounding epidermis and sometimes dermis. Carriers help keep tattoo ink shelf stable, evenly mixed, and free from pathogens.

Solvents are often ethyl alcohol or distilled water; methanol, propylene glycol, and glycerin are also used, along with denatured alcohol or isopropyl alcohol. When an alcohol is used as part of the carrier base in tattoo ink or to disinfect the skin before application of the tattoo, it increases the skin's permeability, helping to transport more pigment into the skin.

==== Additives ====
Preservatives such as benzoic acid may be added to tattoo ink to prevent contamination. Some inks contain formaldehyde as a preservative, which is a carcinogen and may cause dermatitis in the skin. Other inks may use benzoisothiazolinone, which is a skin irritant.

To help the carrier serve as a vehicle for delivering pigment, commercial formulations may include wetting agents, pH-regulating chemicals, stabilizers, and thickening agents.

Ink manufacturers may add witch hazel to help the skin heal after the tattooing process.

=== Vegan inks ===
Some tattoo ink manufacturers produce vegan-friendly inks that do not contain any animal by-products, such as bone char, glycerin, gelatin, and shellac.

== Traditional inks ==
The world's oldest tattoos known to date, those of the Tyrolean Iceman known as Ötzi, were applied 5300 years ago with soot and/or ground charcoal based pigments.

Traditional Ainu tattoos used soot as pigment, which reflected significant beliefs related to the hearth of a home.

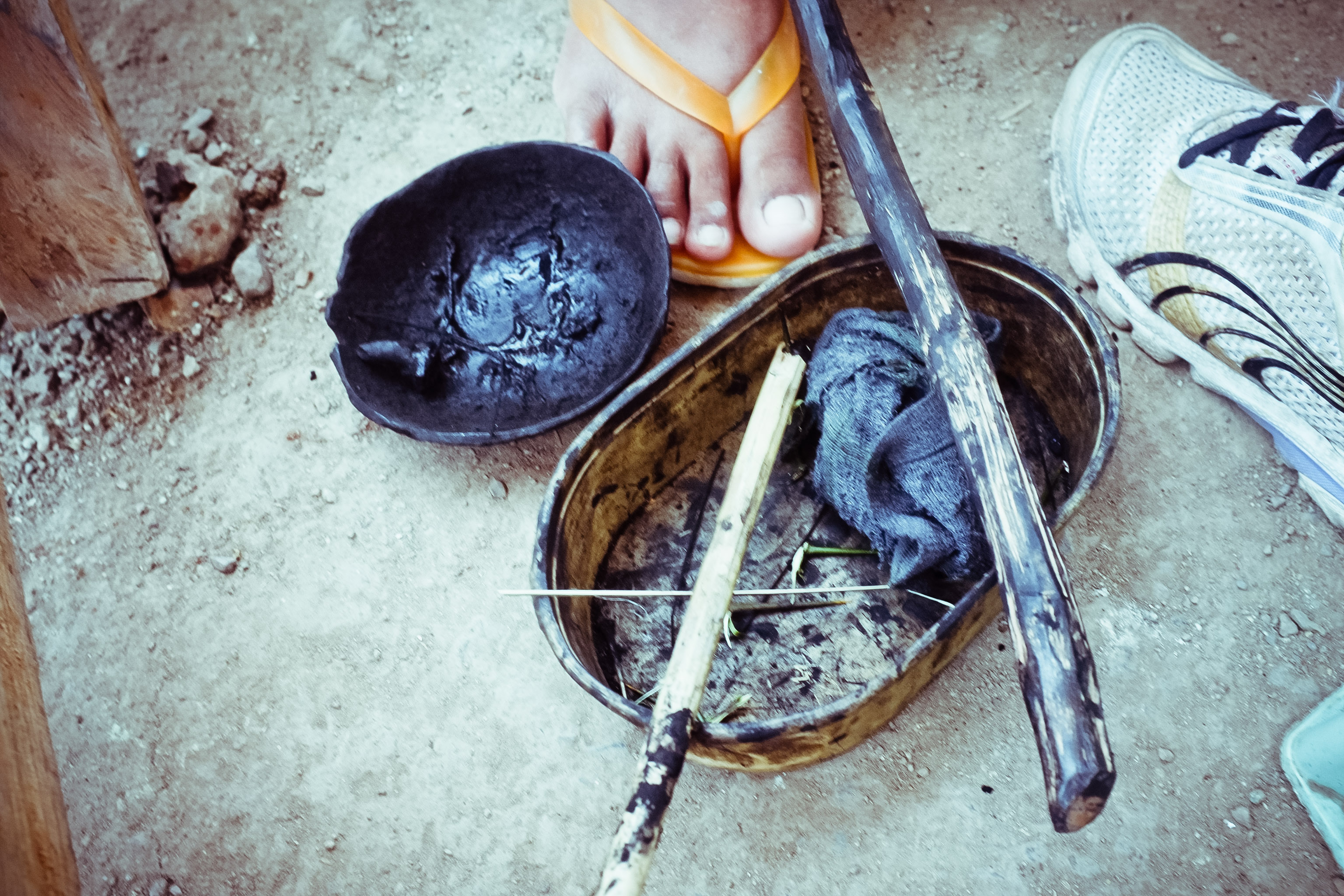
Ink and tools used by Whang-od for traditional Filipino tattoos (batok)

In traditional Filipino tattooing, batok, historical examples include inks made from a range of materials: pounded leaves of a native tomato plant mixed with soot and water; pig bile and soot; or soot made by burning resinous wood. Some ink was made by combining soot and sugarcane juice, left to ferment for a short time to develop some alcohol. Recent practices include combining soot with water in a coconut half-shell.

Inuit women have a tradition of kakiniit, tattoos historically made with qulliq lampblack and seal suet. In the 21st century revival of this tradition, practitioners use manufactured tattoo inks.

Japanese horimono practices include tebori tattoos made by hand using sumi ink. This ink is made with soot from burning particular woods, bound with animal glue, and the method of application results in a greenish black color in the skin.

In the Māori tattoo practice, tā moko, tattoo experts have made ink from the ashes of resinous tree parts (such as kauri gum) or caterpillar fungus, mixed with oil from plants.

== Homemade inks ==
In amateur "stick and poke" tattoos done for amusement or as a hobby, people often use improvised ink, which adds risk of infection and scarring. Prison tattooing also typically uses improvised ink. Pigments may be made from ballpoint pen ink, hobby ink such as India ink, or soot. Homemade or amateur inks may use Listerine, vodka, or isopropyl alcohol as carriers, with glycerin added to prevent the ink from drying out.

== Health effects ==
Components of tattoo ink may cause allergic reactions in skin, including red, green, yellow and blue pigments. Colored inks, such as red, seem to cause allergic reactions more often than black ink, likely because of small amounts of mercury sulfide in some red pigments. Some yellow pigments contain cadmium sulfide, a light-sensitive compound, and upon exposure to sun this can cause photodermatitis, although rare.

Inks may be contaminated with bacteria, such as Mycobacterium chelonae, which can cause infection in the skin.

Several commonly used ingredients are potential carcinogens – for example, most black inks contain carbon black, which may contain polycyclic aromatic hydrocarbons. Many of the particles used in tattoo inks are less than 100 nanometers in diameter, making it easier for them to penetrate cells and possibly cause cancer. Under UV light, azo pigments may degrade into primary aromatic amines (PAAs), which may be carcinogenic. However, a review article in 2012 said "The number of skin cancers arising in tattoos is seemingly low, and this association has to be considered thus far as coincidental."

After application of a tattoo, a portion of the ink is carried away by blood vessels and the lymphatic system, and some of it may be excreted or stored elsewhere in the body. Tattoo pigments may migrate into lymph nodes, including toxic elements in ink such as chromium. Long-term studies would be needed to determine if pigments in human lymph nodes have harmful effects.

In medical imaging, such as mammography, pigments in lymph nodes may be accidentally interpreted as abnormal results, giving false positive results for cancer. Treatment of cancer may include using blue dye in the body to detect a sentinel lymph node, so existing tattoo pigments in lymph nodes may cause difficulty in identifying and treating sentinel nodes.

In rare cases, a person undergoing a magnetic resonance imaging (MRI) exam may feel temporary discomfort or irritation around tattoos made with iron oxide pigments. Looping or circular patterns may contribute to this effect. Large amounts of ink in the skin, such as in blackout tattoos, may also increase the risk of this side effect.

== Regulations ==
=== European Union ===
The European Union requires tattoo ink makers to indicate any hazardous ingredients on product labels. In 2021, the EU established rules requiring certain green and blue pigments, Blue 15:3 and Green 7, to be phased out of tattoo inks.

=== United States ===
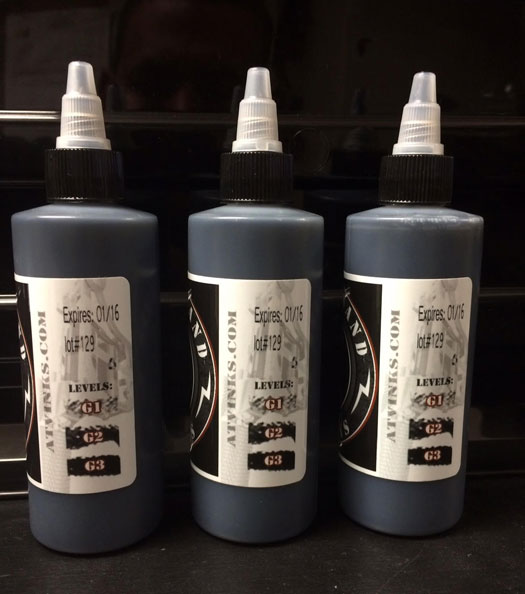
Tattoo inks recalled by the FDA in August 2015 because of bacterial contamination

In the United States, tattoo inks are subject to regulation by the U.S. Food and Drug Administration (FDA). The inks are regulated as cosmetics (which do not require pre-market approval), and the pigments are regulated as color additives. FDA regulations say that color additives intended for injection must show convincing evidence that they are safe to be injected, in order to be approved for this purpose. The FDA has not yet approved any color additives for injection. The FDA does not generally exercise this regulatory authority because of other higher priorities and insufficient evidence of specific color additives causing safety problems in tattoo ink.

The FDA does investigate tattoo inks if they receive reports of safety concerns, such as bacterial contamination, and they sometimes issue product recalls for specific inks.

Under the Fair Packaging and Labeling Act, the FDA requires cosmetics manufacturers to disclose ingredients on products sold to retail customers, but not products used by professionals. Tattoo ink manufacturers typically sell their products to professional tattoo artists, and they are not required to disclose ingredients.

In California, Proposition 65 requires that Californians be warned before exposure to certain harmful chemicals. In 2004, an environmental nonprofit sued several tattoo ink manufacturers for violating this law. A judge ordered two of the companies to put warning labels on their products and in their catalogs to tell California customers that tattoo inks contain heavy metals known to cause cancer, birth defects, and other reproductive harm.

== History ==
Ancient tattooing practices typically used dark pigments derived from vegetable and animal materials. Alongside the development of more complex technology for tattooing, such as electric tattoo machines, tattoo artists developed inks with pigments derived from colorful minerals, both natural and synthetic. People who continue to practice traditional tattooing methods and styles may make their own pigments or purchase manufactured ink. The history of tattoo ink development is connected to the history of pigment development.

=== Ancient ===
People throughout ancient history practiced tattooing, as seen in tattooed human mummies found in many countries. Many used carbon-based pigments, such as soot, bone char, and charcoal. Carbon continues to be a principal ingredient in modern tattoo ink.

One of the oldest known examples of human tattooing is the 5,300-year-old ice mummy known as Ötzi, discovered in 1991 near the border between Austria and Italy. Researchers examined skin samples from several of Ötzi's tattoos and determined that his tattoos were created using carbon-based pigments derived from soot and ash. Microscopic quartz crystals identified among the carbon particles may have originated from stones around the fireplace where the carbon was collected.

Found in southern Peru, in the Chiribaya cultural area, a 1000-year-old mummy of a woman showed decorative and symbolic tattoos made with soot and plant material.

=== 18th and 19th centuries ===
By the 1750s, and likely much before, Japanese horimono artists used a variety of colored inks for large, artistically complex tattoos. In 1897, Gambier Bolton said that the Japanese tattoo artist Hori Chyo had pioneered use of a brown ink, along with the usual black and vermilion inks.

In sailor tattoo traditions dating at least to 1700, English sailors used gunpowder to create blue-black designs in their skin. In 1897, Bolton noted that sailors had recently started to use India ink and cochineal red (carmine), and that English tattoo artist Sutherland Macdonald had found an ultramarine blue and a green ink. Sutherland also experimented on himself to try to find durable lavender and yellow inks.

=== 20th century ===
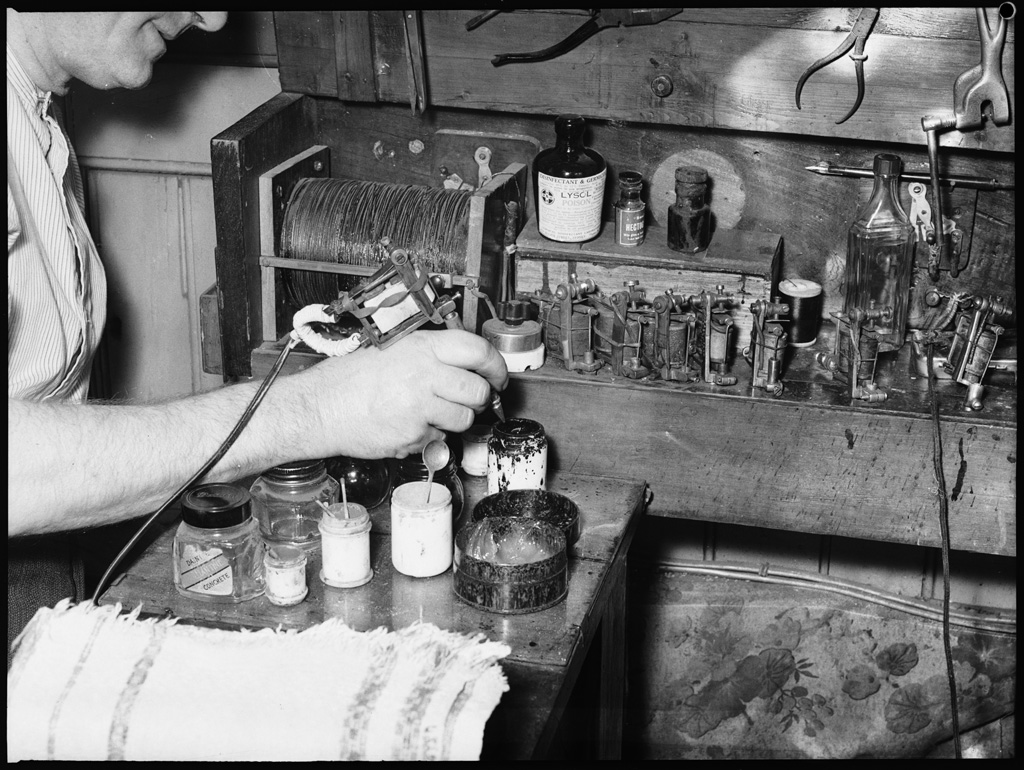
Fred Harris working with tattoo ink in 1937, Sydney, Australia

The invention of electric tattoo machines in the late 1800s supported the growing popularity of tattoos, linked to the development of new inks. In the early 1900s, American tattoo artist Amund Dietzel used ink made with carbon black, "China red" (vermilion), "Casali's green" (viridian), Prussian blue, and a yellow pigment that may have been arylide yellow. By the 1920s and 1930s, several mail-order tattoo supply businesses sold tattoo machines, flash, and inks to tattoo artists. Supplier Percy Waters advised in his 1925 catalog: "Use only the best colors purchased from reliable dealers. They are chemically pure and harmless to the skin, while imitation colors sold by so-called importers, are nothing more than common house paint—and likely poison."

Sailor Jerry, who started working as a tattoo artist in the 1930s, mixed D&C dry color pigments (approved for use in drugs and cosmetics) with isopropyl alcohol and benzalkonium chloride. He worked with Bob Palm, a tattoo artist who had studied chemistry, to find pigments that would expand his color range, including by tattooing himself and seeing if he had a bad reaction. He introduced use of phthalo green, and he used a purple pigment that he kept secret from other artists.

Around the 1950s, artists started more commonly using industrial organic colorants, including aniline dyes (synthetic dyes originally made from coal tar) such as arylide yellow and Malachite green.

== Permanence ==
Tattoo ink is generally permanent, in the sense that it fades very gradually over a lifetime. The reason for this permanence is that tattoo ink is hydrophobic. Tattoo removal is difficult and painful, and the degree of success depends on the materials used.

=== Removable ink ===
R. Rox Anderson developed a tattoo ink to simplify tattoo removal, designed to be easier to remove by laser treatments than traditional inks, called "InfinitInk". The ink is encapsulated in tiny plastic beads; the encapsulated ink is stable in normal light, but under the kind of laser light used in laser tattoo removal, the ink is released from the beads and is absorbed. Anderson co-founded a company called Freedom-2 to bring the ink to market with assistance from Edith Mathiowitz, Joshua Reineke, and A. Peter Morello of Brown University.

=== Semi-permanent ink ===
A company in New York City, Ephemeral, advertised its proprietary tattoo ink as fading 9–15 months after application. Some customers complained that their tattoos were still strongly visible after 15 months or longer.

== Temporary tattoo pigments ==
Mehndi body art involves applying henna dye externally to create a temporary tattoo on the surface of the skin, typically producing a brown color that fades in a few weeks. Health Canada and the US FDA have advised against the use of "black henna" pigment that contains para-phenylenediamine (PPD), an ingredient in hair dyes. Allergic reactions to PPD include rashes, contact dermatitis, itching, blisters, open sores, scarring and other potentially harmful effects.

Jagua tattoos are a form of temporary tattoo made with a fruit-based dye. This dye is derived from a Central and South American fruit (Genipa americana) traditionally used for a variety of purposes including medicine and body art. Jagua ink creates a blue-black color that fades in a couple of weeks. Jagua is sometimes promoted as a healthier alternative to black henna.

== See also ==
- List of inorganic pigments
