= Tattoo removal =

Dermatologic procedure to remove tattoo pigments

External audio
- “Rethinking Ink”, Distillations Podcast Episode 220, Science History Institute

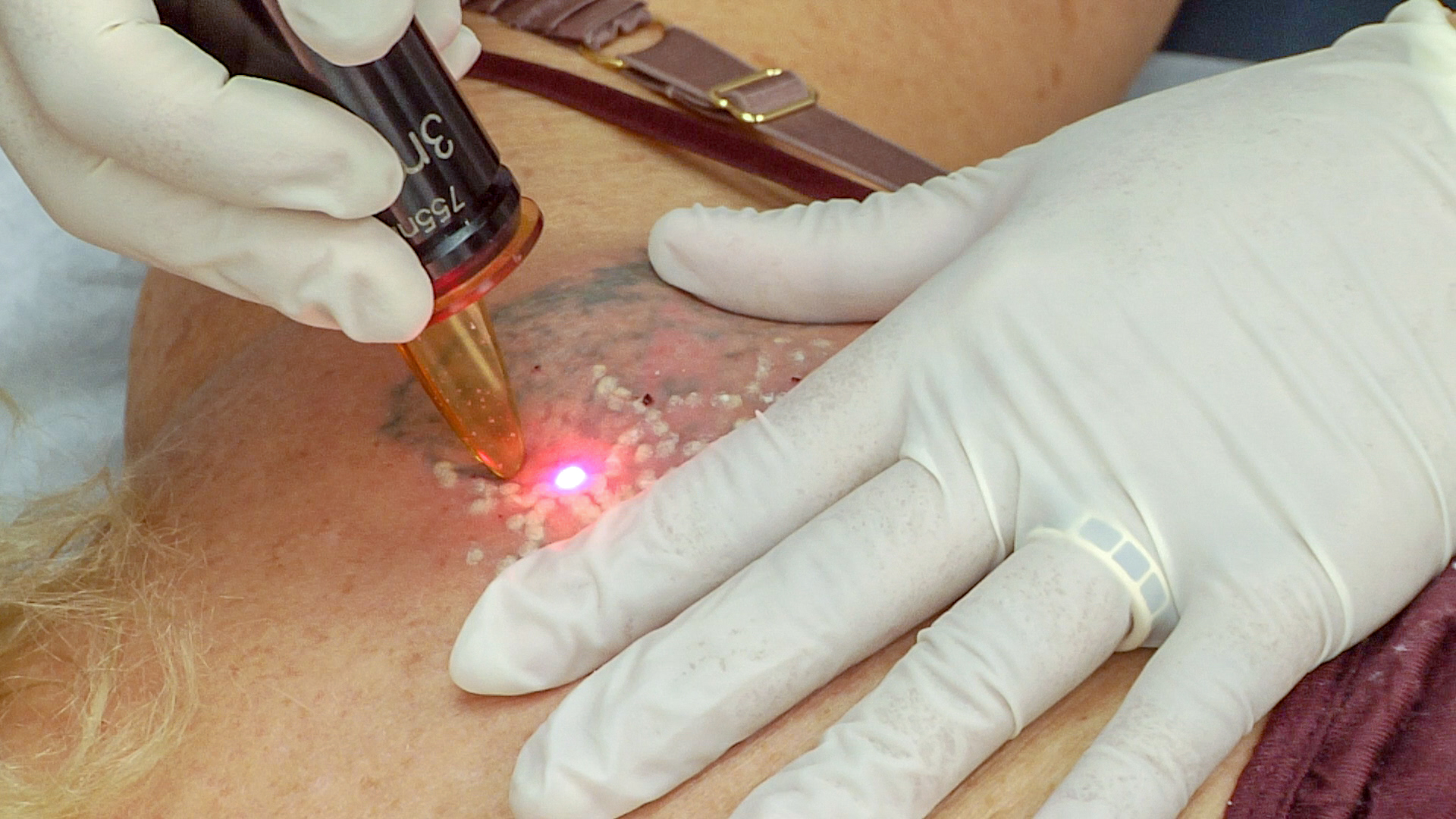
A doctor performs laser tattoo removal treatment using a Q-switched laser.

Tattoo removal is a procedure to eliminate or significantly lighten a tattoo from the skin. People pursue removal for many reasons, including changes in personal taste, social or professional considerations, or a desire to relocate a tattoo. Modern techniques include laser removal, dermabrasion, surgical excision, and other methods. The process of tattooing generally creates permanent markings in the skin, but people have attempted many methods to try to hide or destroy tattoos.

The standard modern method is the non-invasive removal of tattoo pigment using Q-switched lasers. Different types of Q-switched lasers are used to target different colors of tattoo ink; depending on the specific light absorption spectra of the tattoo pigments. Typically, black and other darker-colored inks can be removed completely using Q-switched lasers, while lighter colors, such as yellows and greens, are very difficult to remove. Success depends on a wide variety of factors including skin color, ink color, and the depth at which the ink was applied.

Recent research has investigated the potential of multi-pass treatments and the use of picosecond laser technology.

== History ==
Before tattoo removal with Q-switched lasers began in the early 1990s, continuous-wave lasers were the standard method for tattoo removal. Continuous-wave lasers used a high energy beam that ablated the target area and destroyed surrounding tissue structures as well as tattoo ink. Treatment tended to be painful and cause significant scarring.

Prior to the development of laser tattoo removal methods, common techniques included dermabrasion, TCA (Trichloroacetic acid, an acid that removes the top layers of skin, reaching as deep as the layer in which the tattoo ink resides), Sal abrasion (scrubbing the skin with salt), cryosurgery, and excision, which is sometimes still used along with skin grafts for larger tattoos. Many other methods for removing tattoos have been suggested historically, including the injection or application of tannic acid, lemon juice, garlic, and pigeon dung.

Saline is used to lighten tattoos (including microblading tattoos) through the process of osmosis.

== Motives ==
A poll conducted in January 2012 by Harris Interactive reported that 1 in 7 (14%) of the 21% of American adults who have a tattoo regret getting one. The poll did not report the reasons for these regrets, but a poll that was conducted four years prior reported that the most common reasons were "too young when I got the tattoo" (20%), "it's permanent," "I'm marked for life" (19%), and "I just don't like it" (18%). An earlier poll showed that 19% of Britons with tattoos experienced regret, as did 11% of Italians with tattoos.

Surveys of tattoo removal patients conducted in 1996 and 2006 provided more insight. Of those polled, the patients who regretted their tattoos typically obtained their tattoos in their late teens or early twenties and were evenly distributed by gender. Among those seeking removals, more than half reported that they "suffered embarrassment." A new job, problems with clothes, and a significant life event were also commonly cited as motivations. Tattoos that were once a symbol of inclusion in a group, such as a gang, can make it difficult to gain employment. Tattoos that indicate a significant relationship, such as a spouse, girlfriend, or boyfriend, can become problematic if the relationship ends. Celebrities that have had these kinds of tattoos removed include Angelina Jolie, Eva Longoria, Marc Anthony, and Denise Richards.

== Removal by replacement ==
Some people decide to cover an unwanted tattoo with a new tattoo. A skillful cover-up may completely hide the old tattoo, or it may partially hide the old tattoo, depending on the size, style, colors and techniques used on the old tattoo and the skill of the tattoo artist. Covering up a previous tattoo requires darker tones in the new tattoo to effectively hide the unwanted piece. For tattoos that are especially difficult to cover up, a person may choose to get laser tattoo removal to lighten the ink to make the area easier to cover with a new tattoo.

== Laser removal ==
A laser tattoo removal treatment

Tattoo removal is most commonly performed using lasers that break down the ink particles in the tattoo into smaller particles. Dermal macrophages are part of the immune system, tasked with collecting and digesting cellular debris. In the case of tattoo pigments, macrophages collect ink pigments, but have difficulty breaking them down. Instead, they store the ink pigments. If a macrophage is damaged, it releases its captive ink, which is taken up by other macrophages. This can make it particularly difficult to remove tattoos. When treatments break down ink particles into smaller pieces, macrophages can more easily remove them.

Tattoo pigments have specific light absorption spectra. A tattoo laser must be capable of emitting adequate energy within the given absorption spectrum of the pigment to provide an effective treatment. Certain tattoo pigments, such as yellows and fluorescent inks are more challenging to treat than darker blacks and blues, because they have absorption spectra that fall outside or on the edge of the emission spectra of the tattoo removal laser. Recent pastel-cultured inks contain high concentrations of titanium dioxide, which is highly reflective. Such inks are difficult to remove because they reflect a significant amount of the incident light energy out of the skin.

The gold standard of tattoo removal treatment modality is considered to be laser tattoo removal using multiple separate Q-switched lasers (depending on the specific wavelengths needed for the dyes involved) over a number of repeat visits. There are several types of Q-switched lasers, and each is effective at removing a different range of the color spectrum. Lasers developed during or after 2006 provide multiple wavelengths and can successfully treat a much broader range of tattoo pigments than previous individual Q-switched lasers. Unfortunately the dye systems used to change the wavelength result in significant power reduction such that the use of multiple separate specific wavelength lasers remains the gold standard.

The energy density (fluence), expressed as joules/cm^{2}, is determined prior to each treatment as well as the spot size and repetition rate (hertz). To mitigate pain the preferred method is simply to cool the area before and during treatment with a medical-grade chiller/cooler and to use a topical anesthetic. During the treatment process, the laser beam passes through the skin, targeting the ink resting in a liquid state within. While it is possible to see immediate results, in most cases the fading occurs gradually over the 7–8 week healing period between treatments.

Q-switched lasers are reported by the National Institutes of Health to result in scarring only rarely. Areas with thin skin will be more likely to scar than thicker-skinned areas.

By 2023, the laser tattoo removal market is expected to grow 12.7% annually.

=== Mechanism of laser action ===
Experimental observations of the effects of short-pulsed lasers on tattoos were first reported in the late 1960s by Leon Goldman and others. In 1979 an argon laser was used for tattoo removal in 28 patients, with limited success. In 1978 a carbon dioxide laser was also used, but because it targeted water, a chromophore present in all cells, this type of laser generally caused scarring after treatments.

In the early 1980s, a new clinical study began in Canniesburn Hospital's Burns and Plastic Surgery Unit, in Glasgow, Scotland, into the effects of Q-switched ruby laser energy on blue/black tattoos. Further studies into other tattoo colors were then carried out with various degrees of success. Research at the University of Strathclyde, Glasgow also showed that there was no detectable mutagenicity in tissues following irradiation with the Q-switched ruby laser. This essentially shows that the treatment is safe, from a biological viewpoint, with no detectable increase in the risk of the development of cancerous cells.

It was not until the late 1980s that Q-switched lasers became commercially practical with the first marketed laser coming from Derma-lase Limited, Glasgow. One of the first American published articles describing laser tattoo removal was authored by a group at Massachusetts General Hospital in 1990.

Tattoos consist of thousands of particles of tattoo pigment suspended in the skin. While normal human growth and healing processes will remove small foreign particles from the skin, tattoo pigment particles are too big to be removed automatically. Laser treatment causes tattoo pigment particles to heat up and fragment into smaller pieces. These smaller pieces are then removed by normal body processes. Q-switched lasers produce bursts of infrared light at specific frequencies that target a particular spectrum of color in the tattoo ink. The laser passes through the upper layers of the skin to target a specific pigment in the lower layers.

Laser tattoo removal is a successful application of the theory of selective photothermolysis (SPTL). However, unlike treatments for blood vessels or hair, the mechanism required to shatter tattoo particles uses the photomechanical effect. In this situation the energy is absorbed by the ink particles in a very short time, typically nanoseconds. The surface temperature of the ink particles can rise to thousands of degrees but this energy profile rapidly collapses into a shock wave. This shock wave then propagates throughout the local tissue (the dermis) causing brittle structures to fragment. Hence tissues are largely unaffected since they simply vibrate as the shock wave passes. For laser tattoo removal the selective destruction of tattoo pigments depends on four factors:

- The color of the light must penetrate sufficiently deep into the skin to reach the tattoo pigment. Pigments deeper in the skin are harder to remove than those near the surface.
- The color of the laser light must be more highly absorbed by the tattoo pigment than the surrounding skin. Different tattoo pigments therefore require different laser colors. For example, red light is highly absorbed by green tattoo pigments, while yellow tends not to absorb light.
- The time duration (pulse duration) of the laser energy must be very short, so that the tattoo pigment is heated to fragmentation temperature before its heat can dissipate to the surrounding skin. Otherwise, heating of the surrounding tissue can cause burns or scars. For laser tattoo removal, this duration should be on the order of nanoseconds.
- Sufficient energy must be delivered during each laser pulse to heat the pigment to fragmentation. If the energy is too low, the pigment will not fragment and no removal will take place.

Q-switched lasers are the only commercially available devices that can meet these requirements.

Although they occur infrequently, mucosal tattoos can be successfully treated with Q-switched lasers as well.

A novel method for laser tattoo removal using a fractionated CO_{2} or Er:YAG laser, alone or in combination with Q-switched lasers, was reported by Ibrahimic and coworkers from the Wellman Center of Photomedicine at the Massachusetts General Hospital in 2011. This new approach to laser tattoo removal may afford the ability to remove colors such as yellow and white, which have proven to be resistant to traditional Q-switched laser therapy.

=== Laser parameters that affect results ===
Several colors of laser light (quantified by the laser wavelength) are used for tattoo removal, from visible light to near-infrared radiation. Different lasers are better for different tattoo colors. Consequently, multi-color tattoo removal almost always requires the use of two or more laser wavelengths. Tattoo removal lasers are usually identified by the lasing medium used to create the wavelength (measured in nanometers (nm)):

- Q-switched Frequency-doubled Nd: YAG: 532 nm. This laser creates a green light which is highly absorbed by red, yellow, and orange targets. Useful primarily for red and orange tattoo pigments, this wavelength is also highly absorbed by melanin (the chemical which gives skin color or tan) which makes the laser wavelength effective for age spot or sun spot removal. Nd:YAG lasers may cause hemoglobin absorption, leading to purpura (collection of blood under tissue in large areas), pinpoint bleeding, or whitening of the skin.
- Q-switched Ruby: 694 nm. This laser creates a red light which is highly absorbed by green and dark tattoo pigments. Because it is more highly absorbed by melanin this laser may produce undesirable side effects such as pigmentary changes for patients of all but white skin. This is the best wavelength for blue ink.
- Q-switched Alexandrite: 755 nm. The weakest of all the q-switched devices and somewhat similar to the Ruby laser in that the Alexandrite creates a red light which is highly absorbed by green and dark tattoo pigments. However, the alexandrite laser color is slightly less absorbed by melanin, so this laser has a slightly lower incidence of unwanted pigmentary changes than a Ruby laser. This laser works well on green tattoos, but because of its weaker peak power it works only moderately well on black and blue ink. It does not work at all (or very minimally) on red, orange, yellow, brown, etc. This laser wavelength is also available in a picosecond speed with anecdotal claims that it removes ink faster.
- Q-switched Nd:YAG: 1064 nm. This laser creates a near-infrared light (invisible to humans) which is poorly absorbed by melanin, making this the only laser suitable for darker skin. This laser wavelength is also absorbed by all dark tattoo pigments and is the safest wavelength to use on the tissue due to the low melanin absorption and low hemoglobin absorption. This is the wavelength of choice for tattoo removal in darker skin types and for black ink.
- Dye modules are available for some lasers to convert 532 nm to 650 nm or 585 nm light which allows one laser system to safely and effectively treat multi-color tattoo inks. When dye modules take 532 nm laser wavelength and change it, there is a loss of energy. Treatments with dye packs, while effective for the first few treatments, many not be able to clear these ink colors fully. The role of dye lasers in tattoo removal is discussed in detail in the literature.

Pulse width or pulse duration is a critical laser parameter. All Q-switched lasers have appropriate pulse durations for tattoo removal.

Spot size, or the width of the laser beam, affects treatment. Light is optically scattered in the skin, like automobile headlights in fog. Larger spot sizes slightly increase the effective penetration depth of the laser light, thus enabling more effective targeting of deeper tattoo pigments. Larger spot sizes also help make treatments faster.

Fluence or energy density is another important consideration. Fluence is measured in joules per square centimeter (J/cm^{2}). It is important to be treated at high enough settings to fragment tattoo particles.

Repetition rate helps make treatments faster but is not associated with any treatment effect. Faster treatments are usually preferred because the pain ends sooner.

=== Number of laser tattoo removal treatment sessions needed ===
The number of treatments necessary to remove a tattoo via laser can be predicted by the Kirby-Desai Scale. The number of sessions depends on various parameters, including the area of the body treated, skin color, ink color present, scarring, and amount of ink present. Effectiveness of the immune system may play a role as well.

Complete laser tattoo removal requires numerous treatment sessions, typically spaced at eight weeks or more apart. Treating more frequently than eight weeks increases the risk of adverse effects and does not necessarily increase the rate of ink absorption. Anecdotal reports of treatments sessions at four weeks leads to more scarring and dyschromia and can be a source of liability for clinicians. At each session, some but not all of the tattoo pigment particles are effectively fragmented, and the body removes the smallest fragments over the course of several weeks or months. The result is that the tattoo is lightened over time. Remaining large particles of tattoo pigment are then targeted at subsequent treatment sessions, causing further lightening. Tattoos located on the extremities, such as the ankle, generally take longest. As tattoos fade clinicians may recommend that patients wait many months between treatments to facilitate ink resolution and minimize unwanted side effects.

Certain colors have proved more difficult to remove than others. In particular, this occurs when treated with the wrong wavelength of laser light is used. Some have postulated that the reason for slow resolution of green ink in particular is due to its significantly smaller molecular size relative to the other colors. Consequently, green ink tattoos may require treatment with 755 nm light but may also respond to 694 nm, 650 nm and 1064 nm. Multiple wavelengths of light may be needed to remove colored inks.

One small Greek study showed that the R20 method—four passes with the laser, twenty minutes apart—caused more breaking up of the ink than the conventional method without more scarring or adverse effects. However, this study was performed on a very small patient population (12 patients total), using the weakest of the QS lasers, the 755 nm Alexandrite laser. One of the other main problems with this study was the fact that more than half of the 18 tattoos removed were not professional, and amateur tattoos are always easier to remove. Proof of concept studies are underway, but many laser experts advise against the R20 method using the more modern and powerful tattoo removal lasers available at most offices as an increase in adverse side effects including scarring and dyschromia is likely. Patients should inquire about the laser being used if the R20 treatment method is offered by a facility as it is usually only offered by clinics that are using the 755 nm Alexandrite as opposed to the more powerful and versatile devices that are more commonly used. Moreover, dermatologists offering the R20 method should inform patients that it is just one alternative to proven protocols and is not a gold standard treatment method to remove tattoos.

Multiple pass treatment methods (R20, as mentioned above, and R0) have generally shown to carry a greater risk of side effects, due to the increased amount of energy used in treatment. One caveat to this, however, is incorporating a perfluorodecalin (PFD) patch into the protocol. A PFD patch utilizes a clear silicone gel patch, with a small amount of PFD liquid applied to the treatment area immediately before each pass of laser application, and conducting the passes in rapid succession. The combination of the patch and liquid reduce the epidermal scatter, which can limit the predicted side effects typically seen in aggressive laser tattoo removal treatments (hyper and hypopigmentation, blistering, etc.). Additionally, the liquid reduces the laser frosting very quickly, allowing for faster re-treatment, limiting the time of treatment while still improving efficacy. Early studies have been performed to indicate improved clearance with the use of this patch in 3-4 passes, in a single session, utilizing more energy than typically allowable with a traditional treatment methodology. All these physical properties of the patch work to substantially reduce the total number of laser treatments required for ink clearance. While the PFD patch is currently FDA cleared for use with all picot and nanosecond domain lasers and wavelengths, it is only cleared for Fitzpatrick Skin Types I-III. Early studies have shown anecdotally that there isn't necessarily increased risks with Fitzpatrick Skin Types IV-VI, though still not FDA cleared as an indication.

=== Factors contributing to the success of laser tattoo removal ===
There are a number of factors that determine how many treatments will be needed and the level of success one might experience. Age of tattoo, ink density, color and even where the tattoo is located on the body, and whether the tattoo was professional, or not, all play an important role in how many treatments will be needed for complete removal. However, a rarely recognized factor of tattoo removal is the role of the patient's immune response. The normal process of tattoo removal is fragmentation followed by phagocytosis, which is then drained away via the lymphatics. Consequently, it is the inflammation resulting from the actual laser treatment and the natural stimulation of the hosts' immune response that ultimately results in removal of tattoo ink. Because of this, the effectiveness of laser tattoo removal varies widely.

=== Pain management during treatment ===
Laser tattoo removal is painful; many patients say it is worse than getting the tattoo. The pain is often described to be similar to that of hot oil on the skin, or a "snap" from an elastic band. Depending on the patient's pain threshold, some patients may forgo anesthesia altogether, but most patients will require some form of local anesthesia. Pre-treatment might include the application of an anesthetic cream under occlusion for 45 to 90 minutes or cooling by ice or cold air prior to the laser treatment session. A better method is complete anesthesia which can be administered locally by injections of 1% to 2% lidocaine with epinephrine.

A technique which helps to reduce the pain sensation felt by patients has been described by MJ Murphy. He used a standard microscope glass slide pressed against the tattooed skin and fired the laser through the glass. This technique may represent a simplest and effective method to reduce the pain sensation when treating small tattoos.

=== Post-treatment considerations ===
Immediately after laser treatment, a slightly elevated, white discoloration with or without the presence of punctuate bleeding is often observed. This white color change is thought to be the result of rapid, heat-formed steam or gas, causing dermal and epidermal vacuolization. Pinpoint bleeding represents vascular injury from photoacoustic waves created by the laser's interaction with tattoo pigment. Minimal edema and erythema of adjacent normal skin usually resolve within 24 hours. Subsequently, a crust appears over the entire tattoo, which sloughs off at approximately two weeks post-treatment. As noted above, some tattoo pigment may be found within this crust. Post-operative wound care consists of simple wound care and a non-occlusive dressing. Since the application of laser light is sterile there is no need for topical antibiotics. Moreover, topical antibiotic ointments can cause allergic reactions and should be avoided. Fading of the tattoo will be noted over the next eight weeks and re-treatment energy levels can be tailored depending on the clinical response observed.

=== Side effects and complications ===
About half of the patients treated with Q-switched lasers for tattoo removal will show some transient changes in the normal skin pigmentation. These changes usually resolve in 6 to 12 months but may rarely be permanent.

Hyperpigmentation is related to the patient's skin tone, with skin types IV, V and VI more prone regardless of the wavelength used. Twice daily treatment with hydroquinones and broad-spectrum sunscreens usually resolves the hyperpigmentation within a few months, although, in some patients, resolution can be prolonged.

Hypopigmentation is more commonly observed in darker skin tones. It is more likely to occur with higher fluence and more frequent treatments. Sometimes lighter skin exhibits hypopigmentation after a series of treatments. Allowing more time between treatments reduces chances of hypopigmentation. Since it is more likely to see hypopigmentation after multiple treatments, some practitioners suggest waiting a few additional weeks, after a few sessions. Usually treatment stops until hypopigmentation resolves in a matter of months.

Transient textural changes are occasionally noted but often resolve within a few months; however, permanent textural changes and scarring very rarely occur. If a patient is prone to pigmentary or textural changes, longer treatment intervals are recommended. Additionally, if a blister or crust forms following treatment, it is imperative that the patient does not manipulate this secondary skin change. Early removal of a blister or crust increases the chances of developing a scar. Additionally, patients with a history of hypertrophic or keloidal scarring need to be warned of their increased risk of scarring.

Local allergic responses to many tattoo pigments have been reported, and allergic reactions to tattoo pigment after Q-switched laser treatment are also possible. Rarely, when yellow cadmium sulfide is used to "brighten" the red or yellow portion of a tattoo, a photoallergic reaction may occur. The reaction is also common with red ink, which may contain cinnabar (mercuric sulfide). Erythema, pruritus, and even inflamed nodules, verrucose papules, or granulomas may develop. The reaction will be confined to the site of the red/yellow ink. Treatment consists of strict sunlight avoidance, sunscreen, interlesional steroid injections, or in some cases, surgical removal. Unlike the destructive modalities described, Q-switched lasers mobilize the ink and may generate a systemic allergic response. Oral antihistamines and anti-inflammatory steroids have been used to treat allergic reactions to tattoo ink.

Studies of various tattoo pigments have shown that a number of pigments (most containing iron oxide or titanium dioxide) change color when irradiated with Q-switched laser energy. Some tattoo colors including flesh tones, light red, white, peach and light brown containing pigments as well as some green and blue tattoo pigments, changed to black when irradiated with Q-switched laser pulses. The resulting gray-black color may require more treatments to remove. If tattoo darkening does occur, after 8 weeks the newly darkened tattoo can be treated as if it were black pigment.

Very rarely, non Q-switched laser treatments, like CO_{2} or Argon lasers, which are very rarely offered these days, can rupture blood vessels and aerosolize tissue requiring a plastic shield or a cone device to protect the laser operator from tissue and blood contact. Protective eyewear may be worn if the laser operator chooses to do so.

With the mechanical or salabrasion method of tattoo removal, the incidence of scarring, pigmentary alteration (hyper- and hypopigmentation), and ink retention are extremely high.

The use of Q-switched lasers could very rarely produce the development of large bulla. However, if patients follow post care directions to elevate, rest, and apply intermittent icing, it should minimize the chances of bulla and other adverse effects. In addition, health care practitioners should contemplate the use of a cooling device during the tattoo removal procedure. While the infrequent bulla development is a possible side effect of Q-switched laser tattoo removal, if treated appropriately and quickly by the health care practitioner, it is unlikely that long term consequences would ensue.

=== Risks ===
Although laser treatment is well known and often used to remove tattoos, unwanted side effects of laser tattoo removal include the possibility of discoloration of the skin such as hypopigmentation (white spots, more common in darker skin) and hyperpigmentation (dark spots) as well as textural changes. These changes are usually not permanent when the Nd:YAG is used but it is much more likely with the use of the 755 nm Alexandrite, the 694 nm Ruby and the R20 method. Very rarely, burns may result in scarring, but this usually only occurs when patients do not properly care for the treated area. Occasionally, "paradoxical darkening" of a tattoo may occur when a treated tattoo becomes darker instead of lighter. This may occur with white ink, flesh tones, pink, and cosmetic makeup tattoos.

Some commercially available tattoo inks may contain organic pigments, also known as azo dyes. When these pigments are broken down via laser pyrolysis, the potential release of aromatic amine rings, a known carcinogen, into the body, could occur. This effect is theorized not to be isolated only to laser tattoo removal, but may also occur with solar radiation.

Laser removal of traumatic tattoos may be dangerous depending on the substance of the material embedded in the skin. In one reported instance, the use of a laser resulted in the ignition of embedded particles of firework debris.
