= Russian criminal tattoos =

Tattoo culture

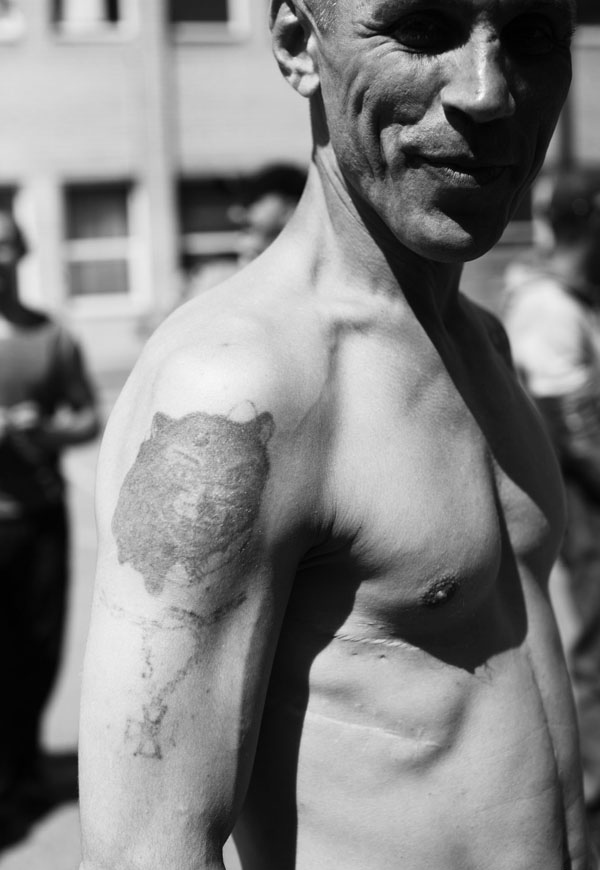
Example of traditional prison tattoo, with medal motif showing

During the 20th century in the Soviet Union, Russian criminal and prison communities maintained a culture of using tattoos to indicate members' criminal career and ranking. Specifically among those imprisoned under the Gulag system of the Soviet era, the tattoos served to differentiate a criminal leader or thief in law from a political prisoner.

The practice grew in the 1930s, peaking in the 1950s and declining in popularity in the 1970s and 1980s.

== Origins ==
The branding of criminals was practised in Russia long before tattooing was customary, and was banned in 1863. In the 19th century, a "pricked" cross on the left hand was often used to identify deserters from the army, and up until 1846, criminals sentenced to hard labour were branded "BOP" (thief), the letters on the forehead and cheeks. Brands were also applied to the shoulder blade and the right forearm, in three categories; "CK" for Ssylno-Katorzhny (hard labour convict), "CП" for Ssylno-Poselenets (hard labour deportee) and "Б" for Begly (escapee). In 1846, VOR was replaced by "KAT"; the first three letters of the word for "hard labour convict" or katorzhnik.

In the 1930s, Russian criminal castes began to emerge, such as the Masti (suits) and the Vor v Zakone (Вор в Законе) or Blatnye (authoritative thieves), and with that a tattoo culture to define rank and reputation. Up until World War II, any tattoo could denote a professional criminal, the only exception being tattoos on sailors.

Under the Gulag system of the Soviet era, laws that were implemented in mid-1940 allowed short prison sentences to be given to those convicted of petty theft, hooliganism, or labor discipline infractions. This led to an increase in the prison population during and after World War II. By January 1941, the Gulag workforce had increased by approximately 300,000 prisoners. Tattoos served to differentiate between an authority or "thief in law", and the many hundreds of thousands of political prisoners who were imprisoned during and shortly after World War Two for crimes not considered those of a "Vor" (thief).

Some of the motifs came from English sailor tattoos, such as the flying tall ships, a heart pierced by a dagger, anchors, a serpent-entwined heart or a tiger baring its teeth.

A thief's collection of tattoos represents his "suit" (mast), which indicates his status within the community of thieves and his control over other thieves within the thieves' law. In Russian criminal jargon or Fenya (феня), a full set of tattoos is known as frak s ordenami (a tailcoat with decorations). The tattoos show a "service record" of achievements and failures, prison sentences and the type of work a criminal does. They might also represent his "thief's family", naming others within hearts or with the traditional tomcat image. Misappropriation of the tattoos of a "legitimate thief" could be punished by death, or the prisoner would be forced to remove them themselves "with a knife, sandpaper, a shard of glass or a lump of brick".

== Bitch Wars ==
After World War II a schism occurred in the criminal world leading to the Bitch Wars. Many convicts had fought in penal units, in contravention of the thieves' code that no thief should serve in the military or cooperate with authorities in any way. Many legitimate thieves found themselves demoted to frayer (outsider), muzhik (мужик, peasant), or suka (сука, traitor, bitch). This was part of a power struggle; with limited resources in prison, outlawing the "bitches" (suki) allowed the legitimate thieves to take more for themselves.

Tattoos were modified and new designs appeared to distinguish between the two groups. The dagger piercing a heart was modified, adding an arrow: this tattoo indicated a legitimate thief and his desire to seek vengeance against those who had violated the thieves' code. The compass rose became an indicator of aggression to prison officials and the "bitches", indicating the vow that "I will never wear epaulettes" and hatred towards those who had served in the Soviet Army. Secret acronyms were created by legitimate thieves that the "bitches" wouldn't recognise, such as СЛОН (SLON, "elephant"), meaning Суки Любят Острый Нож (Suki Lyubyat Ostry Nozh, "Bitches love a sharp knife").

== Khrushchev's reforms and decline of tattooing ==
In the 1950s Nikita Khrushchev declared a policy for the eradication of criminality from Soviet society. Along with propaganda denouncing the "traditional thief" that had grown in popularity in Russian culture, punishments in the prisons intensified for anyone that identified as a legitimate thief, including beatings and torture. As a response to this persecution, the thieves' laws were intensified and the punishment for prisoners wearing unearned tattoos increased from removal to rape and murder.

By the 1970s, the intensification of the thieves' laws had resulted in reprisals against the legitimate thieves, orchestrated by prison authorities who would often throw a legitimate thief into cells with prisoners they had punished or raped. To reduce tensions, criminal leaders outlawed rites of passage and outlawed rape as a punishment. Fights between inmates were outlawed and conflicts were to be resolved through mediation by senior thieves. Additionally, a fashion for tattooing had spread through juvenile prisons, increasing the number of inmates with "illegitimate" tattoos. This ubiquity along with the reduction in violence meant that the "criminal authorities" stopped punishing "unearned" tattoos.

In 1985, perestroika and the new increase in tattoo parlours made tattooing fashionable, and further diluted the status of tattoos as a solely criminal attribute.

== Application ==
The tattooists, or kol'shchiki (prickers), were held in high regard. Tattoo needles can be referred to as peshnya (ice pick), pchyolka (bee), shpora (spur), or shilo (sting), while the tattoo machine can be referred to as mashinka (little machine) or bormashina (dentist's drill), and the ink is referred to as either mazut (fuel oil) or gryaz (dirt). The tattoos themselves were referred to as a reklama (advertising), regalka (regalia), kleimo (brand), or rospis (painting).

== Designs ==
Common designs and themes grew over the years, often having different meanings depending on the location of the tattoo. Combinations of imagery, such as a rose, barbed wire and a dagger, form combined meanings. According to lexicographer Alexei Plutser-Sarno, the tattoos become the only "real aspects of his life". They are a symbol of the owner's commitment to war against the non-thief, the police (menty), and the "bitch" (suka). The environment in the Soviet era was one of heavy visual propaganda, and the tattoos are a reaction to that, and a "grin at authority" (oskal na vlast), often directly parodying official Soviet slogans with Communist Party leaders often depicted as devils, donkeys, or pigs.

A thief's collection of tattoos represent his "suit" (mast), which indicates his status within the community of thieves and his control over other thieves within the thieves' law. They might also represent his "thief's family", naming others within hearts or with the traditional tom cat image.

- Stars – Indicate authority. On the shoulders or the knees ("I kneel to no-one"). The eight-pointed star denotes rank as thief in law depending on where it is placed.
- Cat – Traditional sign of a thief, often with a hat (from "Puss in Boots"). The abbreviation "KOT" (kot; cat) stands for "a native prison inhabitant" (коренной обитатель тюрьмы, korennoy obitatel tiurmy)
- Portrait of Lenin and/or Stalin – Often tattooed on the chest, partly from a belief that a firing squad would never follow orders to shoot such an image. May have originated as a sign of pride among prisoners after the Bolshevik Revolution, as former prisoners were now in control of the country.
- Orthodox church – Indicates a thief, usually a chest tattoo, with the number of cupolas indicating the number of convictions.
- Suns – Rays can be used to indicate number and length of sentences served.
- Skull – Indicates a murderer. Following the abolition of the death sentence for murder in 1947, the number of murders rose significantly, with an extra 10-year sentence being no deterrent to prisoners already sentenced to life.
- Cross – The traditional "thieves' cross" is usually tattooed on the chest. This was very common.
- Ships – With full sails it can indicate someone that has fled from custody, a gulnoy or gulat, or that a wearer is a nomadic thief who travels to steal.
- Dragons – Indicate a "shark" or someone who has stolen state or collectively owned property.
- Spider - when facing up, denotes an active criminal; facing down, it denotes one who has left the lifestyle.
- Medals – Can indicate rank or, if done in pre-Soviet style, indicates contempt for authority.
- Eagle – Traditionally indicated a senior-authority figure; if the eagle is carrying someone it can indicate a rapist.
- Hooded Executioner – A prisoner who has murdered a relative.
- Bells – These can indicate a long sentence with no chance of early release, a long sentence served without parole for being uncooperative to the authorities, or, if on the right shoulder, it can indicate a thief who stole from a church.
- Images of the Madonna with Child (St Mary and the infant Jesus Christ) mean "Prison is my home" and act as a talisman or signify a criminal lifestyle from a young age.
- Eyes – When on the stomach indicate the owner is gay, or on the chest can indicate they are "watching over you". On the buttocks can indicate someone who receives anal sex.
- A circled "A" (done in the style of a finger ring) indicates an anarchist (анархист, anarkhist)
- Circle with a dot inside (as finger ring) known as "The Roundstone" - Indicates an orphan (круглый сирота, krugliy sirota), or the saying "Trust only yourself" (надейся только на себя, nadeisya tolko na sebya)
- Skull inside a square (as finger ring) - Indicates a conviction for robbery (судим за разбой, sudim za razboy)
- Quincunx - Indicates one who has done extensive time, from the saying "the four walls and I" or "four guard towers and me" (четыре вышки и я, chetyre vyshki i ya)
- Snake entwined with a woman - Indicates someone receives penetration during anal sex, especially if tattooed on the back. Often a forced tattoo.
- "Informer-snitch" ("Стукач") A forced tattoo.
- "Enemy of The People" ("BPAГ HAPOДA") A forced tattoo.
- "Kulak" ("Кулак") A forced tattoo.
- "I am a Bitch" (cyкa) A forced tattoo.
- "Beauty marks" or dots on the forehead indicate a "bitch" who has sided with the prison authorities. Beneath the eyes indicates a receiving sexual partner and by the mouth indicates that someone gives oral sex. On the chin indicates a rat (krysa) who steals from other prisoners. A forced tattoo.
- "Red" card suits, diamonds and hearts, on the back indicates the owner receives anal sex. Often a forced tattoo.

== Hand and ring tattoos ==
Tattoos on the hands and fingers were common, and for women, palm tattoos showing insults were popular in the 1940s and 50s.

- A church with three cupolas – "eternal prisoner" applied to someone with at least three convictions.
- An eagle – denotes an authoritative thief, or an escapee from a camp.
- The letters "ОМУТ" (omut; water hole) on the back of the hand indicate one from whom it is difficult to get away (от меня уйти трудно, ot menya uiti trudno, it's hard to get away from me)
- The letters "МИР" (mir; world or peace) on the back of the hand denote one who will never be rehabilitated or re-educated (меня исправит расстрел, menya ispravit rasstrel, only execution will correct me)
- A heart indicates a despised thief with no status, convicted for rape.
- A winged arrow means a traveling thief.
- A crown indicates a criminal boss or authority.
- White cross on a black background; "I've been through the crosses" indicating that they have served solitary confinement.
- Silhouettes of birds; "Love and cherish freedom".
- Crosses on knuckles can indicate number of times in prison.

== Forced tattoos ==
There are tattoos that are forcibly applied to signify "demotion" (razzhalovanie). These may depict sexual acts, and are designed to lower the owner in the eyes of other prisoners and draw harsh treatment from them. These can be applied to those convicted of sexual crimes, those who have not paid a debt, stool pigeons (ssuchenye), stooges (chukhany), and signify that the owner is expelled from the privileged section of a thieves society and are "untouchables" (neprikasaemye/chushki). Other thieves must not accept anything from them or be considered "infected" (zakontachit'sya). As a thief is "born" with his tattoos, they can also be used to signify his "death" and new status as an "untouchable". Even established thieves could be demoted, if, for example, they lost a card game and failed to honor their bets.

== See also ==
- Criminal tattoo
- Prison art
- Prison gang
- Prison tattooing
- Russian Mafia
