= Prison tattooing =

Creation and display of tattoos in prison

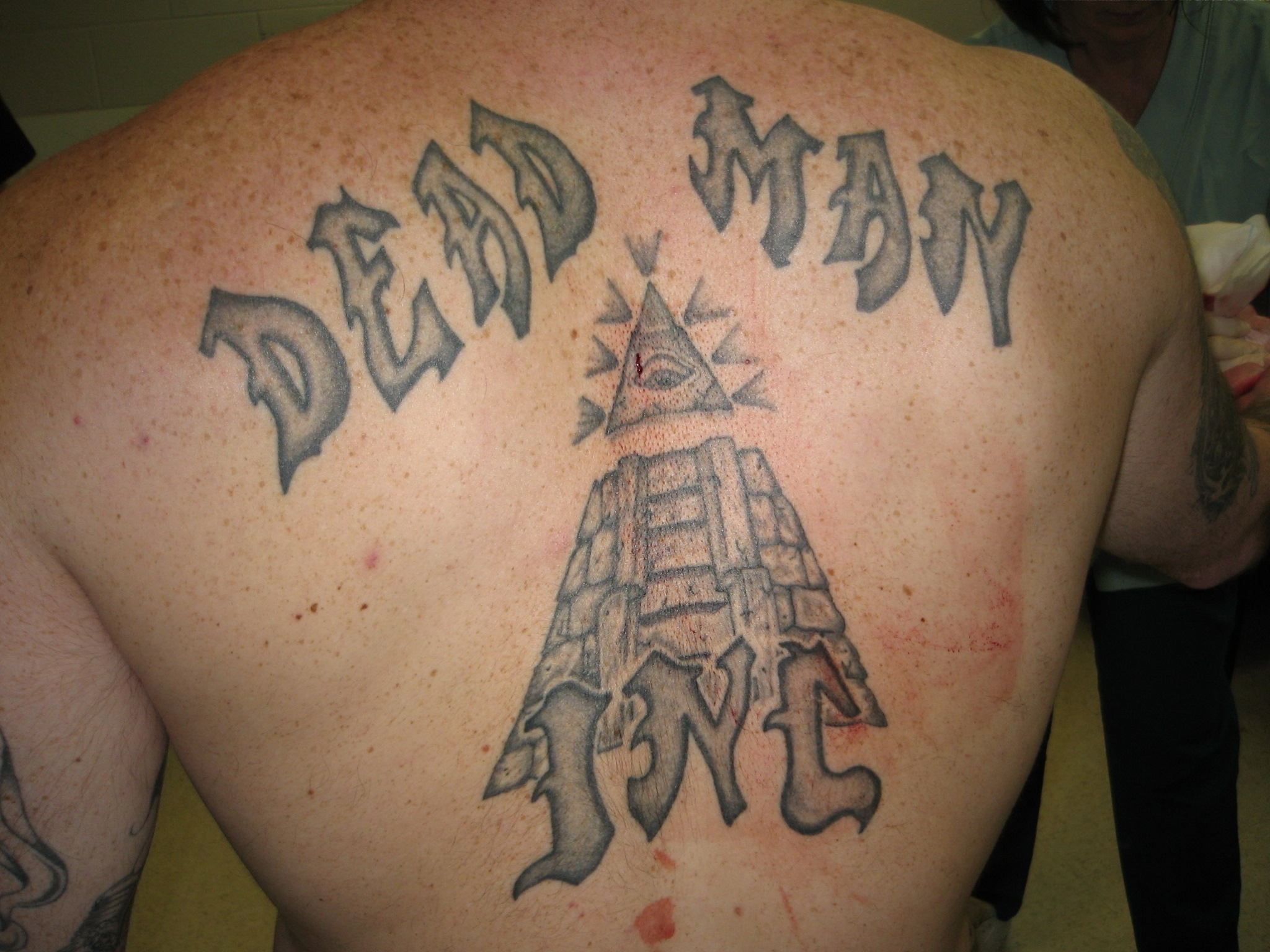
Tattoos on the back of a Dead Man Incorporated gang member

Prison tattooing is the practice of creating and displaying tattoos in a prison environment. Present-day American and Russian prisoners may convey gang membership, code, or hidden meanings for origin or criminal deeds. Lack of proper equipment and sterile environments lead to health risks such as infection or disease (hepatitis C, HIV) from contaminated needles.

== Process ==
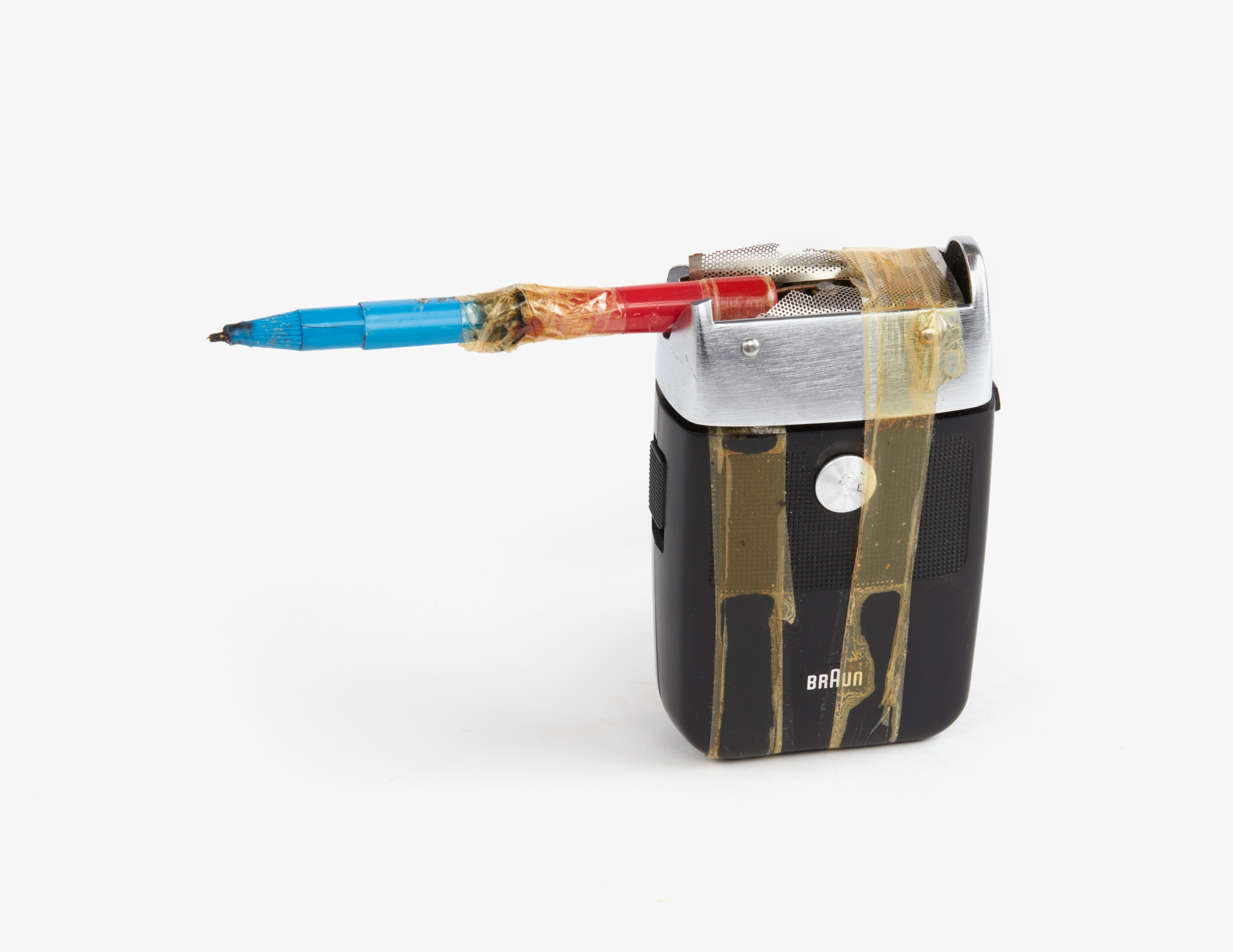
Makeshift tattooing equipment assembled from an electric shaver and a ballpoint pen. This device was confiscated in a prison cell in Falun, Sweden in 1994.

While not illegal, tattooing in United States prisons is against institutional rules and is therefore unregulated. The inmates do not have the proper equipment necessary for the practice. Inmates find ways to create their own tattooing devices out of their belongings and found materials. Improvised tattooing equipment has been assembled from materials such as mechanical pencils, magnets, radio transistors, staples, paper clips, or guitar strings. In addition to tattooing equipment, tattoo ink needs to be improvised—potentially consisting of ink taken from pens, melted plastic, soot mixed with shampoo, and melted Styrofoam. Prison tattoos are not generally applied free of charge; they are usually done in exchange for food, stamps, cigarettes, phone time, canteen items, or favors, such as sex or targeted violence.

== Motifs ==
There are many different symbols and numbers that represent multiple gangs or groups. Certain images, like spider webs, can represent the length of sentences. The well-known teardrop tattoo can signify that the wearer was raped while incarcerated or, reportedly in West Coast gang contexts, that the wearer has killed someone.

Tattoos are also used to communicate who the inmates are as people—for example, white supremacists will display prominent tattoos to show their beliefs. Some common symbols used in this manner are: the percentile 100%, a white supremacist indicator of racial purity; Valknuts; swastikas. Runic insignia of the Schutzstaffel ("lightning bolts") are sometimes awarded to members of white gangs for assigned assaults on other races.

Three dots arranged as a triangle (∴) mean "mi vida loca" or "my crazy life" to Mexican inmates linked to the Mexican Mafia, while four dots (∷) have the same meaning, but are found on Mexican gang members associated with the Nuestra Familia; a clock with no hands represents "doing time"; spider webs are a symbol of being trapped; or the number 13 to signify being unlucky.

One common prison tattoo is the five dots tattoo, a quincunx usually placed on the hand, with different meanings in different cultures.

Mostly seen in the UK but used elsewhere too, four dots tattooed across the knuckles stand for ACAB (All Cops Are Bastards), or a dot on each hand in between the thumb and forefinger—one meaning going into prison, and one meaning they have completed their sentence.

In Ireland, a common tattoo ex-inmates give themselves is a simple dot placed under the eye using Indian ink, colloquially known as a "jail dot."

A Borstal dot, a dot under an eye, also meant doing time, but this tattoo has become a lot less common since Borstals were abolished. Another less common prison tattoo dates back to Borstals, which earned itself the name the "Borstal glove," is the back of a criminal's hand outlined and filled in by Indian ink.

A spider web tattooed on the elbow or the back of the hand usually symbolizes time served in prison.

== Risks ==
Since the tattoo machines are homemade and efficient means of sterilization are not available, there are many health risks involved. Deadly diseases like hepatitis and HIV/AIDS can be passed from one person to the next through shared needles. Also, the makeshift ink can damage the skin, cause permanent scarring, or contain harmful chemicals. Tattoo equipment is also considered contraband, and tattooing can be considered by prison officials to be a punishable form of self-mutilation. In 2011, the Federal Bureau of Prisons reclassified tattooing as a high severity prohibited act.

== See also ==
- Prison art
- Russian criminal tattoos
- Criminal tattoo
- Teardrop tattoo
- Black-and-gray
