= Paper Chained =

Australian prison art magazine

- Cover of issue 5, art by Jayde Farrell
- Editor: Damien Linnane
- Categories: Prison art, prison literature
- Frequency: Quarterly
- First issue: 2017
- Country: Australia
- ISSN: 2653-0775 (print); 2653-0783 (web)

Paper Chained is a quarterly Australian prison arts magazine. The magazine circulates in print and digital formats and publishes contributions from prison inmates, former prisoners and their family members, and other works connected with incarceration, including opinion pieces, poetry, fictional stories, essays, visual arts, and photographs of sculptures. Funded chiefly by the Sydney-based Community Restorative Centre (CRC), (Note: The Sydney-based Community Restorative Centre (CRC) supports people affected by the criminal justice system. In addition to providing the primary funding for Paper Chained, the organization supports a radio program for incarcerated people and a project which records prisoners' music.) the non-profit magazine is mailed to prisoners around the world without charge. It regularly reaches more than 12,000 inmates in Australia.

== Publication history ==
The magazine was first published in January 2017 and was initially funded and edited by a relative of a prisoner. (Note: The magazine's founder and initial editor chose to remain anonymous; the first four issues credit its staff as the Running Wild Collective.) This person had limited contacts in prison and accepted help in obtaining submissions from Damien Linnane, a librarian, author and artist who had recently been released from prison in New South Wales (NSW). The magazine founder was unable to continue the endeavour after four years and passed editorship to Linnane, who published the fifth annual issue in January 2021.

Circulation remained low due to the difficulty in communicating with prisoners in Australia. Awareness of the magazine spread within prisons through word of mouth, reaching additional prisons as inmates were transferred. However, during this early period the magazine became banned by prisons in New South Wales and several prisons in Queensland and Victoria; the bans were over concerns that the magazine's pen-pal program (Note: Studies have shown that pen-pal programs have positive effects on prisoner health and rehabilitation, but such programs are uncommon in Australia. In Victoria, prisoners must demonstrate "exceptional circumstances" to be allowed into a pen-pal program, while rules are unclear in other states and territories.) could allow inmates to communicate with other inmates in protective custody, in violation of prison rules. The bans were overturned after petitioning by prisoners and the discontinuation of the pen-pal program.

Linnane met the Commissioner and Assistant Commissioner of Corrective Services NSW while holding an exhibition at the Boom Gate Gallery (Note: The Boom Gate Gallery, located at the Long Bay Correctional Centre, had exclusively shown art by New South Wales prisoners since 1992.) in December 2021. Discussing Paper Chained, the officials suggested making the magazine available via tablet computers, which were then being adopted for virtual visitation due to the COVID-19 pandemic. Readership rose from 200 printed copies to a potential 12,000 digital views (the prison population of NSW). Some prison systems print the magazine locally for internal distribution. Linnane was then able to secure funding from CRC which allowed the magazine to be published quarterly.

Content from Paper Chained is read aloud on the Vision Australia Radio network's weekly program Inside Voice.

== Content ==
Almost all of the magazine's content is from prisoners from Australia, New Zealand and the United States. Approximately 30% of submissions are from female prisoners (who account for less than 10% of the prison population) and there are also significant contributions from Aboriginal artists. Poetry comprises the bulk of submissions.

Themes of incarceration, isolation and mental health issues are common as the artists relate their experiences. While sometimes viewed by mainstream audiences as depressing, the target audiences are prisoners who gain a sense of shared experiences and the assurance that others are going through the same difficulties.

While constructive criticism of the prison system may be published, some material determined likely to be banned from prisons is revised. Artists are not paid but retain copyright of their work.

A 2024 paper in the journal Incarceration noted that the magazine helped inmates to express themselves and forged connections in the prison population. Civil liberties journalist Paul Gregoire wrote that the magazine "help[s] inmates reform" and described it as "abolitionist in nature".

== Exhibitions ==
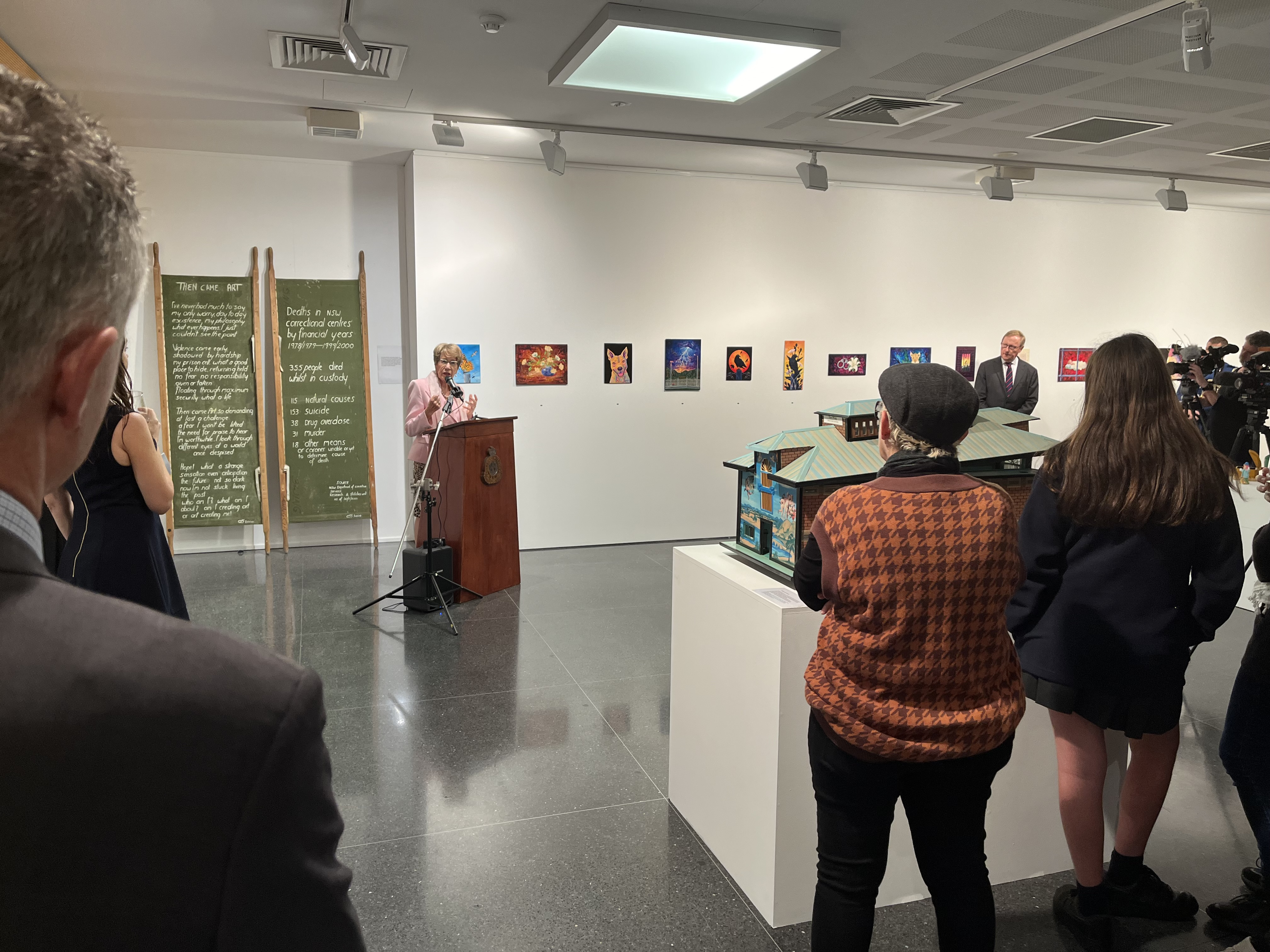
NSW Governor Margaret Beazley speaks at the opening of the Paper Chained International art exhibition (2 May 2024)

In May 2024, the magazine held the Paper Chained International exhibition of inmate art at the Boom Gate Gallery, at Sydney's Long Bay Correctional Centre. The exhibition was opened by NSW Governor Margaret Beazley (Note: Governor Beazley had formerly served as president of the NSW Court of Appeal and as an executive of the Australian branch of Amnesty International. In her speech opening the Paper Chained International exhibition, she likened the prison writings of Linnane, who initially wrote on the back of inmate request forms, to those of Oscar Wilde, who was allowed a single page of paper each day.) and contained 107 pieces of artwork from 25 prisons in 8 countries, including Australia, Kenya, New Zealand, the United States, Wales, and Mexico. Works included scenes of prison life, abstract paintings, landscapes and cityscapes, self-portraits, embroideries, and paintings by Native Americans and Māori. Laura Rumbel of the Maitland Mercury called the exhibition "eclectic and challenging".

Paper Chained collaborated with the Beyond the Bars art exhibition, held in Brisbane, Australia, in March 2025. This exhibition focused on First Nations artists and the benefit of arts programs in rehabilitation. Paper Chained International toured to Newcastle, New South Wales in February 2026.

== See also ==
- Prison art
- Prison literature
- Prison newspaper
- Zine
