= Black August =

Black August may refer to:

- Black August (novel), 1934 novel by Dennis Wheatley
- Black August (commemoration), annual commemoration to dedicated to Black freedom fighters and political prisoners
- Black August (album), 2003 album by Killah Priest
- Black August (film), 2007 film
- Black August: A Hip-Hop Documentary Concert, a 2010 documentary directed by dream hampton
