= Teardrop tattoo =

Type of tattoo

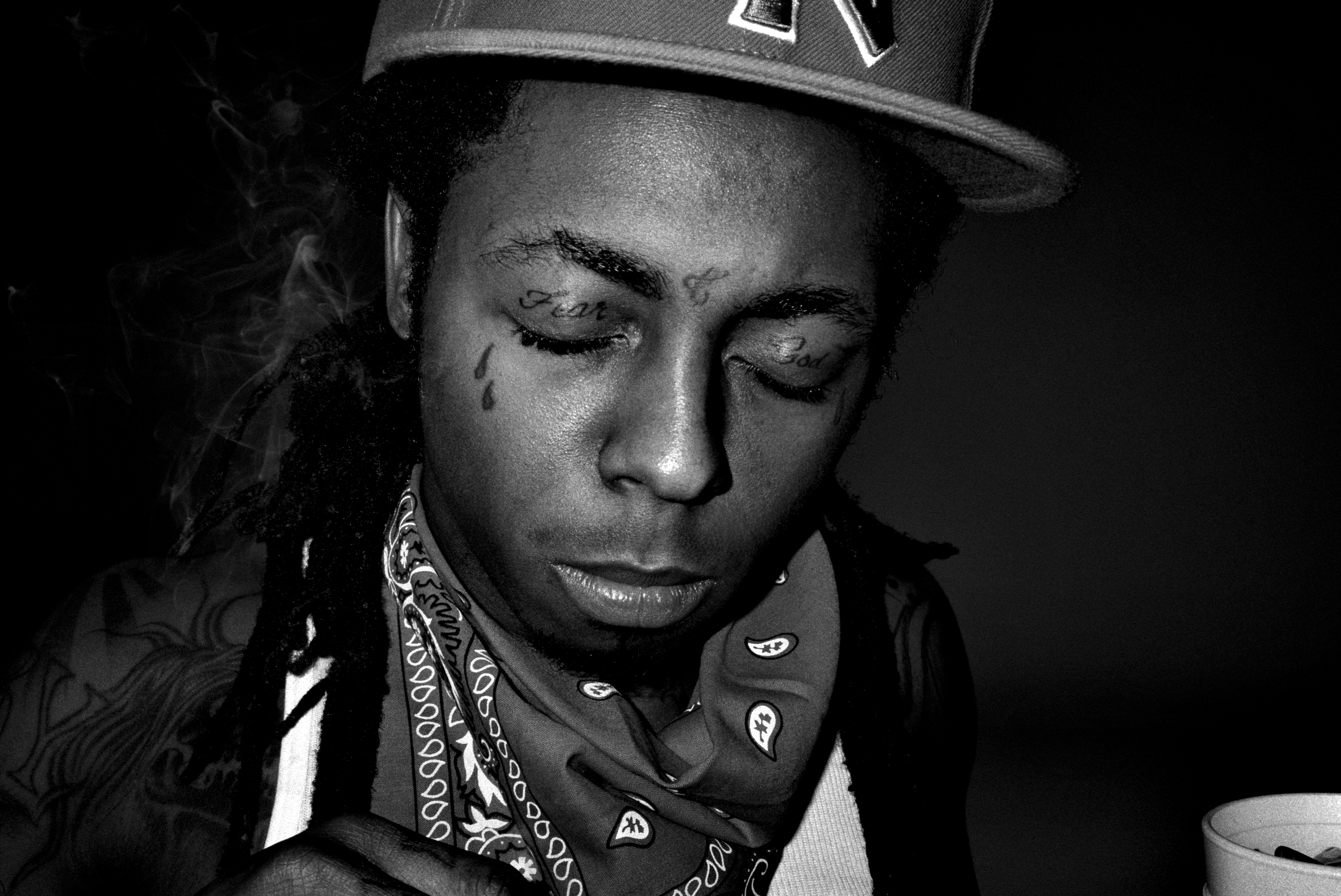
Rapper Lil Wayne with teardrop tattoos below his eyes

The teardrop tattoo or tear tattoo is a symbolic tattoo of a tear that is placed underneath the eye. The teardrop is one of the most widely recognised prison tattoos and has various meanings.

It can signify that the wearer has spent time in prison, or more specifically that the wearer was raped while incarcerated and tattooed by the rapist as a "property" mark and for humiliation, since facial tattoos cannot be concealed.

The tattoo is sometimes worn by the female companions of prisoners in solidarity with their loved ones. Amy Winehouse had a teardrop drawn on her face in eyeliner after her husband Blake entered the Pentonville prison hospital following a suspected drug overdose.

It can acknowledge the loss of a friend or family member: Basketball player Amar'e Stoudemire has had a teardrop tattoo since 2012 honouring his older brother Hazell Jr., who died in a car accident.

In West Coast United States gang culture, the tattoo may signify that the wearer has killed someone and in some of those circles, the tattoo's meaning can change: an empty outline meaning the wearer attempted murder.

Sometimes the exact meaning of the tattoo is known only by the wearer as in the case of Portuguese footballer Ricardo Quaresma, who has never explained his teardrop tattoos.

== See also ==
- Criminal tattoo
