= Five dots tattoo =

Tattoo with various meanings

Illustration of five dots tattoo.

The five dots tattoo is a tattoo of five dots arranged in a quincunx, usually on the outer surface of the hand, between the thumb and the index finger.

The tattoo has different meanings in different cultures—it has been variously interpreted as a fertility symbol, a reminder of sayings on how to treat women or police, a way members of People Nation or Nuestra Familia affiliated gangs identify themselves (People gangs use the number five, while Folk Nation gangs use six), a recognition symbol among the Romani people, a group of close friends, standing alone in the world, or time spent in prison (with the outer four dots representing the prison walls and the inner dot representing the prisoner).

Thomas Edison had this pattern tattooed on his forearm.

== See also ==
- Criminal tattoo
- Prison tattooing
