= Donald "C-Note" Hooker =

American visual artist and writer (born 1965)

- Hooker in 2016
- Born: Donald Oliver Hooker; December 13, 1965 (age 60); Los Angeles, California, U.S.
- Known for: Visual art, writing
- Movement: Prison art, artivism

Donald Oliver Hooker (born December 13, 1965), known professionally as Donald "C-Note" Hooker, is an American visual artist and writer known for works created during his incarceration within the California state prison system.

== Theater and carceral arts ==
In 2016, while incarcerated at California State Prison, Los Angeles County, Hooker participated in theatrical workshops conducted by The Strindberg Laboratory, portraying a parole officer in an original staging covered by People magazine and PBS SoCal's cultural documentary series Departures.

== Visual art ==
Hooker's visual artwork addresses themes of racial justice, carceral conditions, and political movements, and has been associated with prison art and artivism. His 2016 work Black August-Los Angeles was featured by The Guardian in its retrospective on the history of the Black August movement. His artwork has also been exhibited in civic spaces, including the Anne T. Kent California Room at the Marin County Civic Center, and discussed in the San Francisco Bay View.

In 2026, Hooker contributed mixed-media artwork to an investigative photo-essay on California solitary confinement co-published by The Marshall Project and KQED.
