= Black August (commemoration) =

Annual event to remember Black prisoners

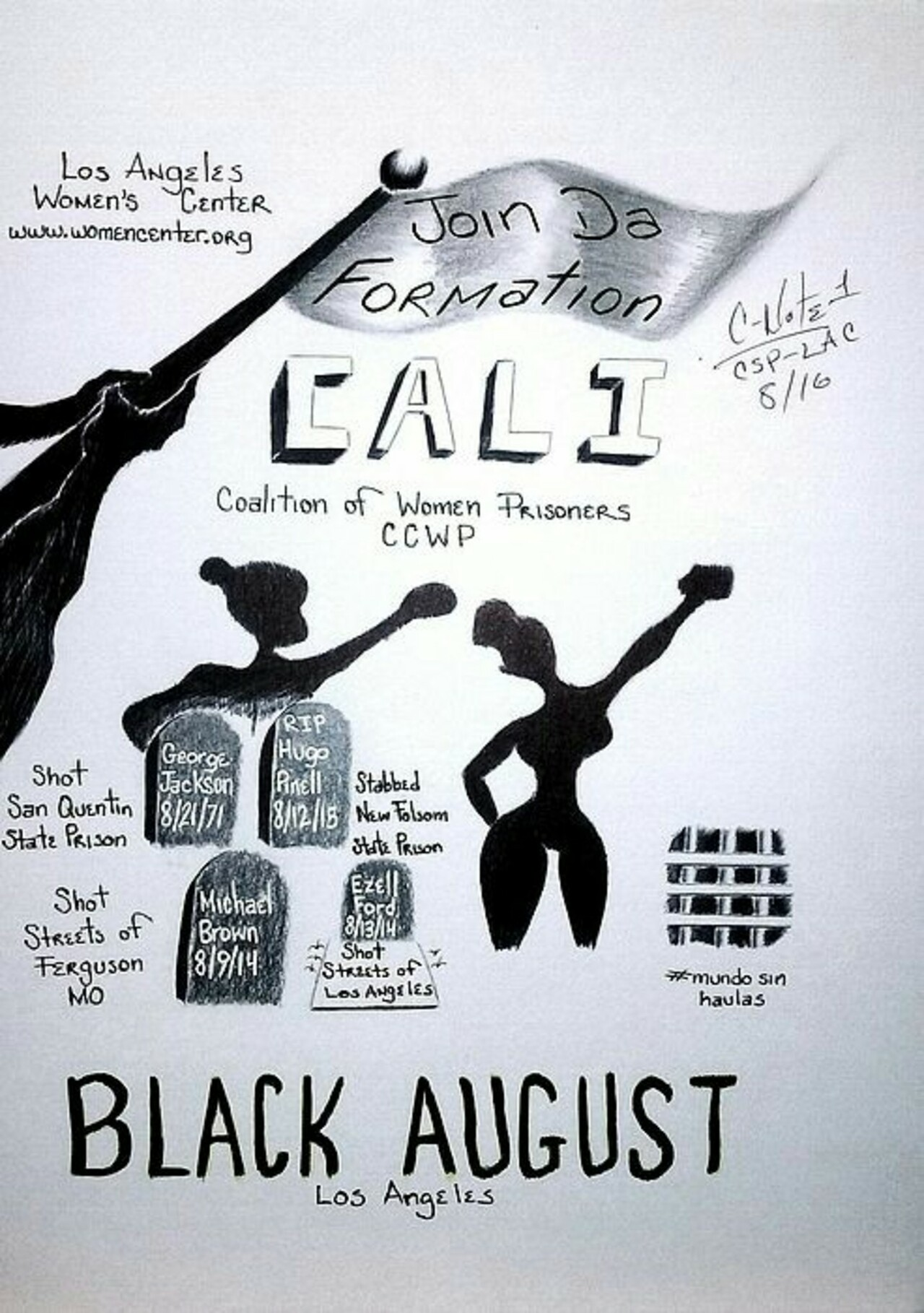
American prisoner artist, C-Note's, 2016, ink on paper artwork, Black August - Los Angeles.

Black August is an annual commemoration and prison-based holiday to remember Black political prisoners, Black freedom struggles in the United States and beyond, and to highlight Black resistance against racial, colonial and imperialist oppression. It takes place during the entire calendar month of August.

Black August was initiated by the Black Guerilla Family in San Quentin State Prison in 1979 when a group of incarcerated people came together to commemorate the deaths of Jonathan P. Jackson (d. August 7, 1970) and George Jackson (d. August 21, 1971) at San Quentin State Prison.

== Impact in culture and the arts ==
Black August as a cultural movement has had a significant impact in the arts. The 2008 film Black August (film) focuses on the experiences of prison activist George Jackson. A book named Black August: 1619 – 2019 by Gloria Verdieu released in 2019. The Black Collective launched the Black August Mixtape in 2019. In visual art, the virtual exhibition "Black August" opened at the Crenshaw Dairy Mart in 2020.

== Dates celebrated or commemorated during Black August ==
- August 1: Emancipation Day in Antigua and Barbuda, Anguilla, The Bahamas, Barbados, Belize, Bermuda, British Virgin Islands, Dominica, Grenada, Guyana, Jamaica, Saint Kitts and Nevis, Trinidad and Tobago, and Canada -- commemorating the anniversary of the Slavery Abolition Act 1833 (abolishing slavery in the British Empire) coming into force on 1 August 1834
- August 2: Chokwe Lumumba (b. August 2, 1947 – d. February 25, 2014) an early leader of the black separatist organization Republic of New Afrika is born in 1947
- August 4: Debbie Sims Africa of the MOVE Organization is born in 1956
- August 4: Thomas Sankara, Marxist revolutionary and Pan-Africanist, is named president of Burkina Faso in 1983
- August 4: Albert Woodfox, one of the Angola Three and former Black Panther Party member, dies in 2022
- August 5: Nelson Mandela is arrested and imprisoned in 1962
- August 5: the Montgomery Riverfront brawl takes place in 2023 in Montgomery, Alabama.
- August 6: Jamaica gains independence from the United Kingdom in 1962
- August 7: death of Jonathan P. Jackson (b. June 23, 1953 – d. August 7, 1970) at San Quentin State Prison
- August 8: New Afrikan revolutionary Mutulu Shakur (b. August 8, 1950 – d. July 7, 2023) is born in 1950
- August 9: Mike Brown is killed by a white police officer in Ferguson, Missouri, sparking the Ferguson Uprisings in 2014
- August 10: The Attica Prison Rebellion of 1971 is frequently invoked and commemorated as part of Black August, as it was a key moment in the radical prison movement. Although the officially recognized dates of the rebellion are September 9-13, 1971, the book Tip of the Spear: Black Radicalism, Prison Repression, and the Long Attica Revolt, by Orisanmi Burton argues that "Attica is Black August resistance." Burton describes what he calls the "Long Attica Revolt," arguing that the event we refer to as "Attica," actually began in the Manhattan House of Detention (aka "The Tombs") on August 10, 1970 and persists in different forms into the present day. From this perspective, the revolt fits within the August calendar, August 10, 1970 -
- August 11: Watts riots also known as the Watts Uprising, August 11-16 1965
- August 12: Hugo Pinell (b. March 10, 1945 – d. August 12, 2015), of the San Quentin Six who were involved in the attempted prison break to liberate George Jackson in 1971, is killed in a high-security state prison in 2015
- August 14: Bois Caiman: Vodou ceremony that would lead to the first large scale uprising of the enslaved of Saint Domingue and spark the Haitian Revolution
- August 17: birth of pan-africanist leader Marcus Garvey (b. August 17, 1887 – d. June 10, 1940)
- August 21: beginning of Nat Turner's Rebellion (August 21-23, 1831)
- August 21: death of George Jackson (b. September 23, 1941 – d. August 21, 1971) at San Quentin State Prison
- August 22: the Haitian Revolution begins in 1791
- August 23: Uprising of the enslaved in Saint Domingue, beginning of the Haitian Revolution and commemorated by UNESCO as the International Day for the Remembrance of the Slave Trade and its Abolition
- August 24: Safiya Bukhari (b. April 2, 1950 – d. August 24, 2003), member of the Black Panther Party and the Black Liberation Army, co-founder of the Jericho Movement and the Free Mumia Abu-Jamal Coalition (NYC), and vice president of the Republic of New Afrika, dies in 2003
- August 28: Emmet Till, age 14 (b. July 25, 1941 – d. August 28, 1955), is abducted, tortured, and lynched in Mississippi in 1955
- August 29: August Rebellion: A group of about 200 women incarcerated at Bedford Hills Correctional Facility for Women, a maximum-security prison in New York State, launch an uprising, taking control of two buildings and a recreational yard protesting the treatment of Black teenager, Carol Crooks, in 1974
- August 30: Gabriel's Rebellion, a planned rebellion of enslaved persons in Richmond, Virginia in 1800
- August 30: birth of Fred Hampton (b. August 30, 1948 – d. December 4, 1969), who was deputy chairman of the Black Panther Party at the time of his assassination by the US Federal Bureau of Investigation.
