= Criminal tattoo =

Tattoos associated with criminal activity and gang membership

There are histories and patterns of criminal tattoos in several countries and cultures, including forced tattooing as punishment for convicts and voluntary acquisition of tattoos by professional criminals and gang members. There are histories and patterns of criminal tattoos, including prison tattooing, in countries such as Australia, France, Italy, Japan, Russia, and the United States, and these patterns have been studied by criminologists. Some gangs have distinctive tattoos. Tattoos can also be a record of the wearer's personal history—such as their skills, specialties, accomplishments, incarceration, world view and/or means of personal expression. Tattoos have been associated with deviance, personality disorders, and criminality. However, there is no causal relationship between tattoos and crime.

== History ==
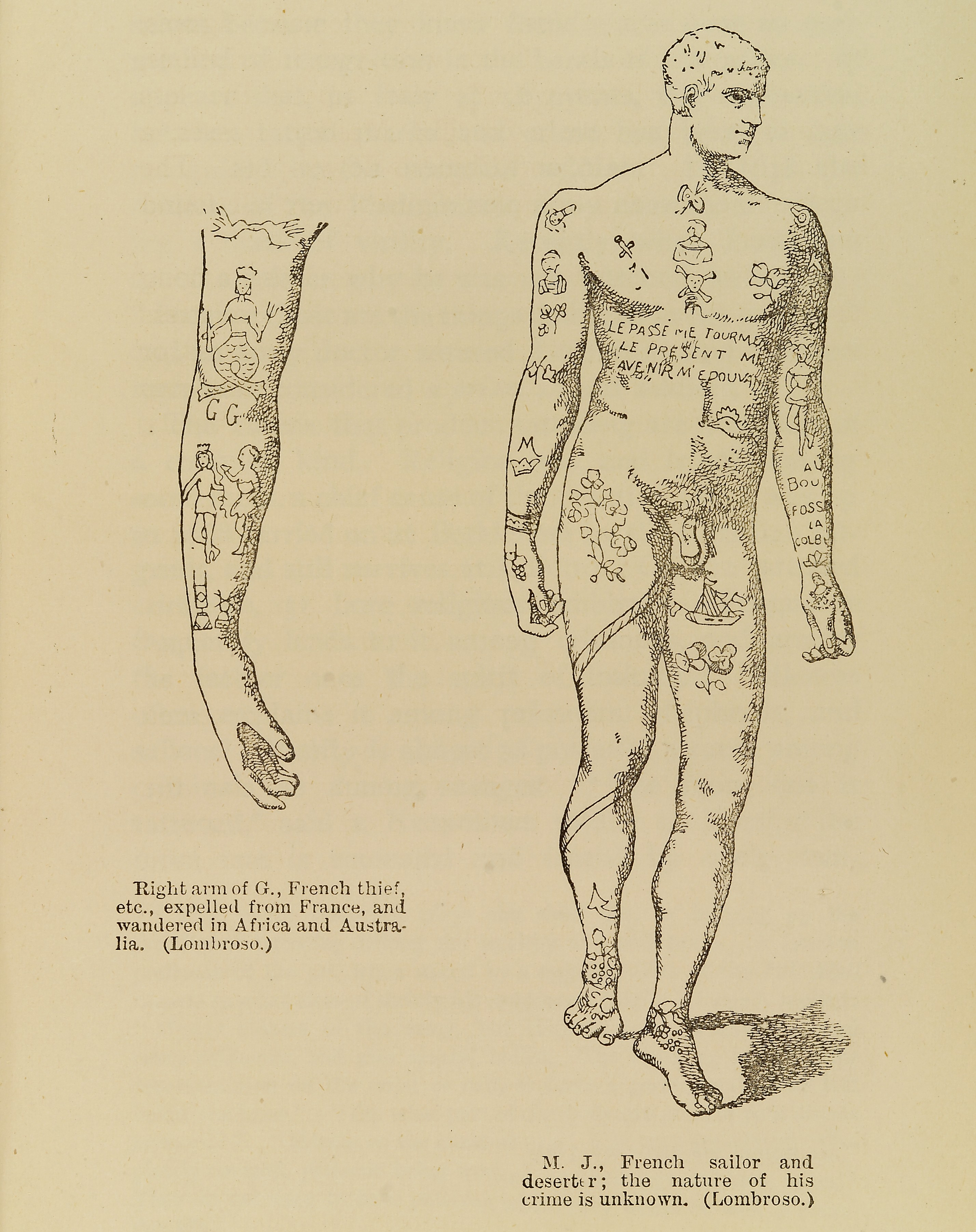
From The Criminal by Havelock Ellis (1890); originally by Cesare Lombroso

The art of tattooing dates back to 8000 BC when it was used as a means of identification amongst different cultures. Ancient Greek and Roman histories, as well as ancient Japanese and Chinese histories possess a record of criminality being associated with tattoos, but it was not until the 16th to 18th century that this notion became more prevalent in other parts of the world. Over time, tattooing began to be used to mark prisoners and those who committed crimes, so law enforcement would be able to monitor those who disrupted and caused harm to communities. As a means of tracking criminals, noting a person's tattoos became an efficient way to document them. It provided a unique descriptor that set a criminal apart from others.

Rebels and lawless individuals started to mark themselves with tattoos to signify their actions which they took pride in or identified with; this could be acts of rebellion, crimes, personal beliefs, and commitment to a certain group. Convicts had knowledge of their tattoos being used to exercise more control over them, but the rebellious, individuality of tattoos proved to be more important.

== Criminal tattoos by country ==
=== Australia ===
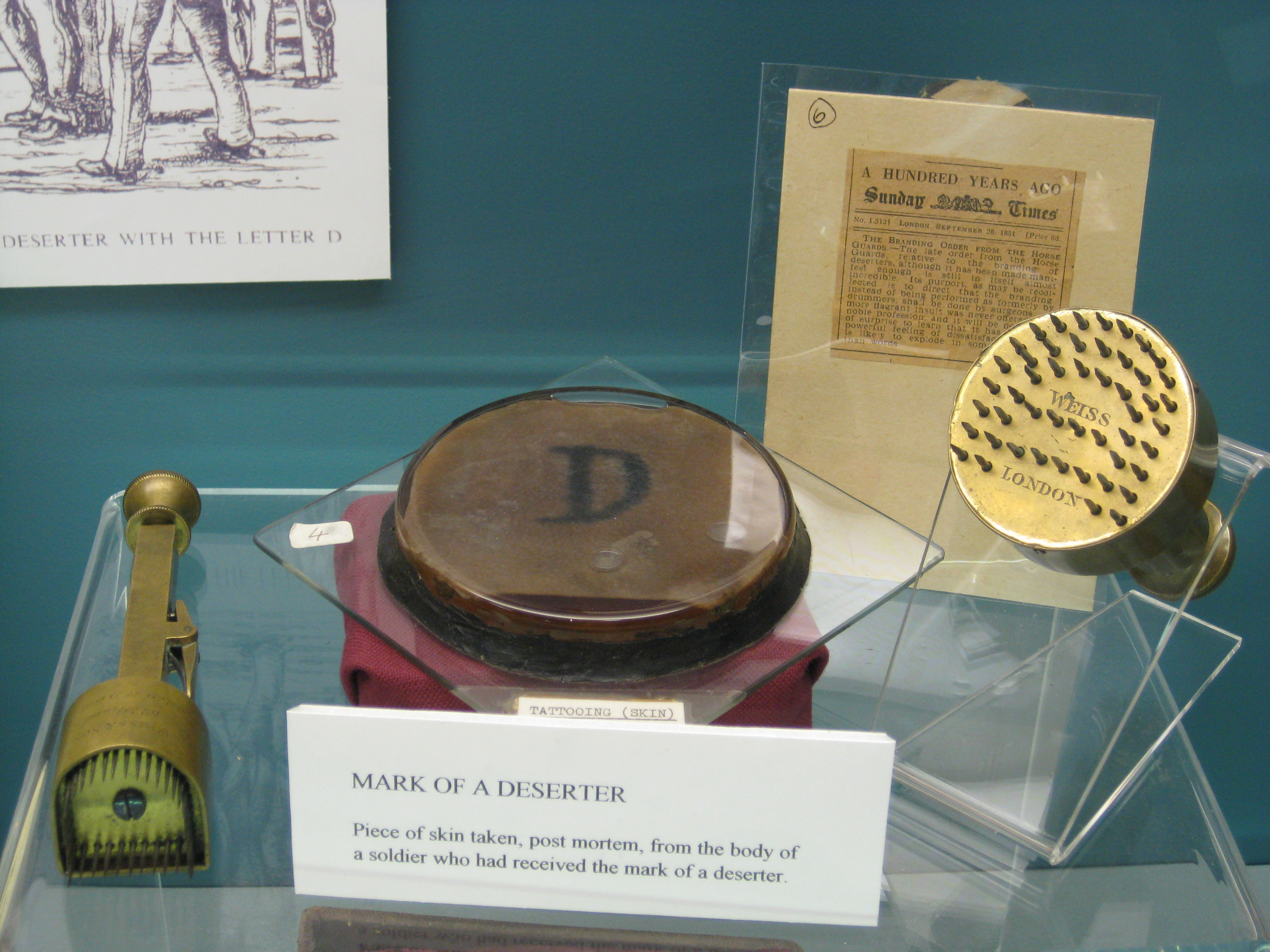
Tattoo marking a deserter from the British Army. Skin removed post-mortem.

Prisoners who were transported from Britain to Australian penal colonies between 1787 and 1867 were sometimes tattooed with marks intended to signify disgrace, for example, D for deserter. Prisoners often modified these tattoos to conceal the original design or to express wry or rebellious messages. A common prison tattoo in Australia is 'ACAC' - the initials to the derogatory phrase, 'all cops are cunts'.

=== China ===
Because of Confucianism and the association with the criminal underworld, tattooing is looked down upon in China. Traditionally, tattooing was used to mark and publicly shame criminals.

King Mu of Zhou ordered his vassal Lord Lü (吕侯) to formulate the Lü Xing. It lists the "Five Punishments": the five primary penalties employed by ancient Chinese officials on criminals. The first (and least severe) of these punishments was the tattooing of the criminal's face with indelible ink. This punishment was known as mò (墨) or qíng (黥), and later called mò xíng (墨刑) or rù mò (入墨).

Qingling, often known as "branding the face", has been used to tattoo the faces of convicts since before the Qin dynasty.

=== France ===
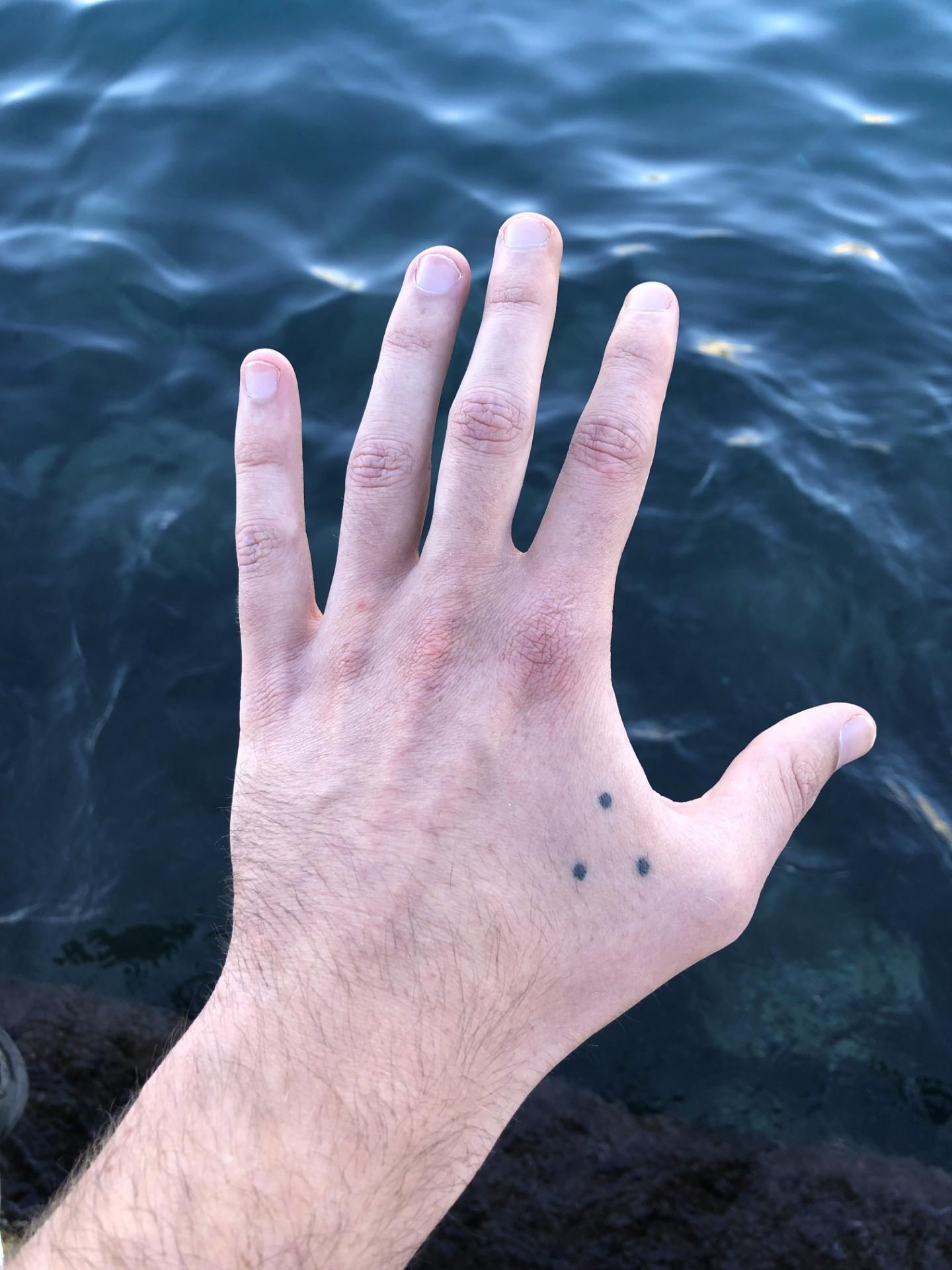
"Mort aux vaches" tattoo

In France, five dots tattoo resembling the dots on a die, placed on the hand between index finger and thumb are found on prison inmates. This tattoo represents the individual between the four walls of the prison cell (un homme entre quatre murs—a man between four walls); this also has the same meaning in Russia, Germany and Spain.

Tattoos of three dots on the hand mean "death to cops" (mort aux vaches / flics / poulets / keufs), also used in Germany, "nichts sehen, nichts hören, nichts sagen" ("see/hear/say nothing"= no snitch/ing.)

A single dot on the cheek usually means the wearer is a pimp (point des maquereaux).

A stick figure holding a trident is also a common French prison tattoo.

=== Italy ===
Towards the end of the 19th century, Italy implemented the Bertillonage system as a means to identify criminals; this method was used to also target anyone who was a threat to social order and was deemed "suspicious".

Tattoos were not only seen on criminals but it was viewed as a common trait amongst criminals within the Bertillonage system. People with tattoos were set apart from others, and it was used as evidence that they were to be seen as different in the general public. This idea was applied to perceiving someone's psyche and deducing if they are biologically inclined to criminal behavior, as higher pain tolerance, primal nature, and shameless attitudes were associated with a predisposition towards criminal behavior.

Specific, identifiable tattoos are seen within organized crime. "La Stidda," a Mafia-style criminal organization in Sicily, is known for using star tattoos to identify members. This small, five-point star is called a stiddari and is typically placed between the thumb and index finger on the right hand.

=== Japan ===
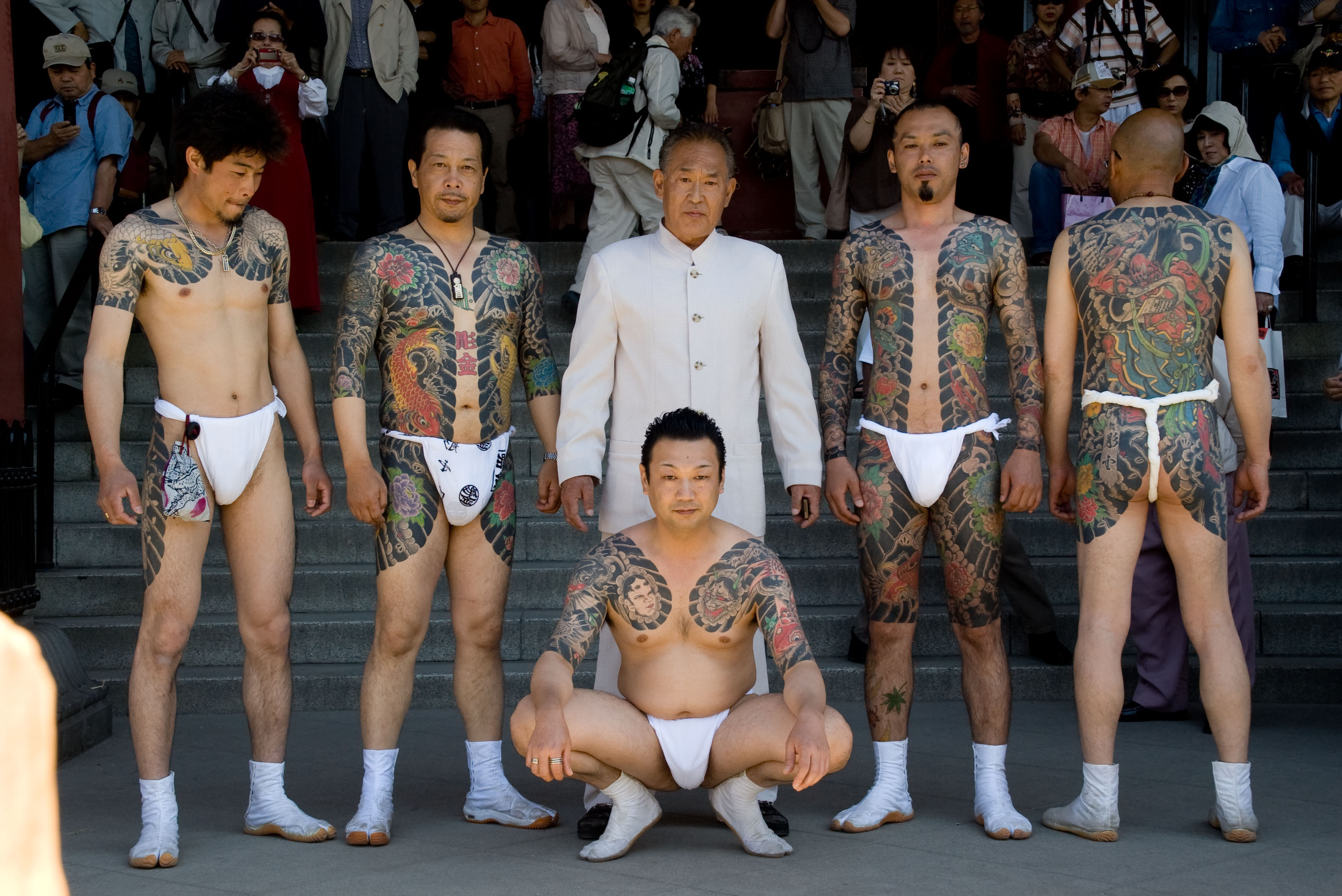
Tattooed yakuza

The Edo period in Japan exemplified the movement for internal peace within the country. Tattoos started to be used to mark those who committed crimes, which led to the association of tattoos with criminals. The Meiji restoration period followed the Edo period; Japan aimed to be viewed as more civilized during this time, so tattooing began to be considered barbaric and was outlawed throughout the country.

Yakuza, the organized crime syndicate of Japan, dates back to the 17th century and maintains a strong loyalty. A form of committing is by embracing tattoos, which make them identifiable within the gang and to the public.

The Yakuza's tattoos cover large areas of the body. The tattoos could cover arms, chest, back, and legs, but may not be visible when wearing traditional Japanese garments, such as a kimono, due to the specific placement. As a member of the Yakuza, enduring the painful process of tattooing was viewed as a declaration of loyalty and courage. Modern Yakuza tattoos, with common symbols and visual motifs, are noted for their similarity to current Western tattoo styles. Current Yakuza have full-body tattoos, typically inked in secret by tattoo artists associated with clans. Due to a clear association between tattoo artistry and crime, the practice was shortly banned following the Meiji restoration period. During the US occupation after World War II, this law was repealed.

Because of the association of the Yakuza with tattoos, the stigmatization of tattoos in Japan has become a part of their cultural norm. As the public grew more knowledgeable about criminal activity, the portrayal of gangs became more common in popular films, which reinforced the connection between tattoos and suspected criminal behavior. Although Yakuza membership declined after the Anti-Organized Crime Law was enacted in 1991 and enforced in 1992, the gang is still active. As a means of avoiding interactions with gang members in public and the history of the association, people with tattoos, regardless of gang affiliation, are not permitted to enter a number of establishments due to societal standards and expectations.

=== Russia ===
Russian criminal tattoos have a complex system of symbols that can give detailed information about the wearer. Wearing false or unearned tattoos is punishable in the criminal underworld. Tattoos made in a Russian prison use improvised ink and needles, and often have a distinct bluish color and usually appear somewhat blurred because of the lack of instruments to draw fine lines. Tattoos of portraits of Soviet leaders like Lenin and Stalin were applied in the belief that they would protect against execution.

In addition to voluntary tattooing, tattoos are used to stigmatize and punish individuals within the criminal society. These tattoos may be placed on an individual who fails to pay debts in card games, or otherwise breaks the criminal code, and often have very blatant sexual images, embarrassing the wearer. Tattoos on the forehead are sometimes forcibly applied, and designed both to humiliate the bearer and warn others about him or her. They frequently consist of slurs about the bearer's ethnicity, sexual orientation, or perceived cooperation with the prison authorities. They can indicate that the holder is a member of a political group considered offensive by other prisoners (e.g., Vlasovite), or has been convicted of a crime (such as child rape) that is disapproved of by other criminals. They can also advertise that the bearer is "downcast", or of the lowest social caste in prison, usually used for the sexual gratification of higher-ranked inmates.

Examples of body tattoos and their significance (these tattoos are most characteristic of the Old Regime when the Vory V Zakone was more structured in prisons):

- American symbols, such as dollars, eagles, and the Statute of Liberty may have meanings including protest and a longing for freedom.
- Barbed wire across the forehead signifies a sentence of life imprisonment and refusal to reform.
- Birds over the horizon: "I was born free and should be free." Bearer longs for a life outside prison.
- Cat: a career as a thief. A single cat means the bearer worked alone; several cats mean the bearer was part of a gang. The word "cat," in Russian, forms an acronym indicating the wearer's natural home is in prison. Alternately, can signify cleverness.
- Celtic Cross: Part of the racist white power movement. It has also been used to represent crosshairs of a gun, meaning that a wearer is a hitman, and he too will meet a violent end one day.
- Cross: A small cross either on the forehead, finger, or between the thumb and forefinger is sometimes seen on convicts as a symbol of serving time in prison. There is another category of tattoos—of rings on the fingers and symbols on the hands—which informs other inmates of the bearer's rank when the bearer is clothed: A cross on the chest can represent a high ranking in the Russian mob.
- Five dots: Represents time done in prison. Four of the dots represent walls, while the fifth represents the prisoner.
- Executioner: Murderer, or that they follow the Thieves' Code
- Spider Web: If the spider is in the center, the bearer is dedicated to a life of crime; if it is climbing out of the web, the bearer is trying to reform himself. A few other versions are that the wearer is a drug addict, like an insect trapped in a spider's web, he is trapped in some narcotic web, or that it signifies a time in prison as each ring of the spider web represents one year in prison.
- Stars or epaulettes on shoulders show status in the prison hierarchy and opposition to formal systems of power.

=== United States ===
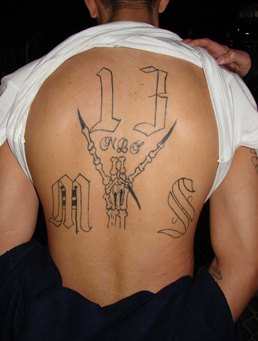
MS-13 gang member with back body tattoo

Tattoos can commonly be found on those related to a gang, as they represent pride in their membership. The symbols and typefaces used will vary and can indicate which gang one may belong to; the location of the tattoo is also notable, as it indicates the level of exposure and potential identification one may want to have in the general public.

One of the most well-known criminal tattoos is the teardrop tattoo. This is more symbolic of criminal activity among West Coast gangs where a teardrop tattoo underneath the eye can indicate whether an individual committed murder or attempted murder. Other meanings of this tattoo are indicating time spent in prison or the loss of a loved one associated with a gang.

A common tattoo in American prisons for Hispanic inmates is four dots or three dots. The dots represent that you have earned your keep in your gang. The three dots would represent the 13 of the southern gangs and the same for the northern gangs with four dots :: for 14. Geographic location is commonly referred to, so another identifiable tattoo is an area code (Ex. 213 would represent Los Angeles). Hispanic gangs have a trend of using old English script and incorporating religious themes in their tattoos, as a substantial portion of members and their families are Catholic. Their tattoos are frequently larger and easily visible.

Markers of the Aryan Brotherhood, a white Neo-Nazi prison gang include but are not limited to the letters AB, Celtic imagery, and the number 666. Themes of racism are evident in Aryan Brotherhood gang tattoos through white supremacist language and Nazi references.

Gangs within law enforcement agencies, such as the Los Angeles County Sheriff's Department and Immigration and Customs Enforcement, often use tattoos as identifiers.

The Alien Enemy Validation Guide includes tattoos in order to designate someone as a member of a criminal association.

==== Prison tattoos ====
In the United States, the tattooing of criminals increased in the 1930s, and this could be attributed to tattooing in prisons. Although tattooing is highly prohibited in U.S. prisons, inmates take part and accept the disciplinary action often taken. Studies have shown that inmates would receive tattoos while serving their sentence are more extroverted; they have a sense of belonging and embrace being a prisoner. This trait is coupled with a lack of self-discipline.

Since tattooing in prison is illegal in many jurisdictions, the inmates do not have the proper equipment necessary for the practice. This forces inmates to find ways to create their own tattooing devices out of their belongings. The tattoo ink used to create the tattoo requires a certain quality to appear correctly. Inmates can acquire ink a number of ways: street ink from visits or corrections officers or it could be created with a few components. Ink could be made with water, isopropyl alcohol, and black soot. Improvising meant burning various materials to acquire the soot and ingredients containing alcohol such as mouthwash. Improvised tattooing equipment has been assembled from materials such as mechanical pencils, Bic pens, radio transistors, staples, paper clips, or guitar strings.

Certain tattoo designs have developed recognized coded meanings. The code systems can be quite complex, and because of the nature of what they encode, the designs of criminal tattoos are not widely recognized as such to outsiders. Coded prison tattoos commonly found in North America:

- Three dots making a triangle - typically on a hand, representing the three words "mi vida loca," Spanish for "my crazy life"
- Teardrop - under the eye; multiple meanings, commonly symbolizes committing or attempted murder
- Area codes - no specific location on body; gang members will identify with the area code of their neighborhood or gang's location
- Spider web or clock with no hands - symbolizes time spent in prison
- The number 13 - demonstrates being a member of the Mexican Mafia, a prison gang
- The number 14 - demonstrates being a member of the Nuestra Familia, a prison gang

== Tattoos for enslaved prostitutes ==
Forced and enslaved prostitutes are often tattooed or branded with a mark of their pimps. Women and girls being forced into prostitution against their will may have their pimps' name or gang symbol inked or branded with a hot iron on their skin. In some organizations involved with the trafficking of women and girls, like the mafias, nearly all prostitutes are marked. Some pimps and organizations use their name or well-known logo, while others use secret signs. In the past, the branding mark was usually small, sometimes hidden between the labia minora. Today, some pimps write their names in big letters upon the body of the victim.

== See also ==
- 18th Street Gang – Transnational criminal gang
- Aryan Brotherhood – Neo-Nazi prison gang and organized crime syndicate
- Barrio Azteca – Mexican-American gang originally based in El Paso, Texas
- Drug cartel – Group drug trafficking operations
- Gang signal – Various verbal/visual gestures used to reveal one's affiliation with a particular gang
- Human branding – Process by which a mark is permanently burned into the skin of a living person
- List of Chinese criminal organizations
- List of criminal enterprises, gangs and syndicates – List of groups engaged in illegal activities
- MS-13 – Transnational criminal gang
- Organized crime – Structured criminal groups
- Russian mafia – Umbrella term for Russian organized crime groups
- Tong (organization) – Chinese immigrant secret societies in Western cities
- Triad (underground society) – Chinese transnational organised crime syndicate
- Yakuza – Members of organized crime syndicates in Japan
