= Prison art =

Art created by imprisoned people

Prison art is art that is created by persons who are imprisoned.

Prison art is unique in several ways. Due to the low social status of prisoners, art made by prisoners has not historically been well-respected. The art, much like the prisoners themselves, is often subject to controls. Art made by prisoners is sometimes valued, or conversely sometimes sought to be actively destroyed. Prisoners often lack common art supplies, and have been known to fashion supplies from materials at hand such as candy or instant coffee.

== Examples of prison art ==
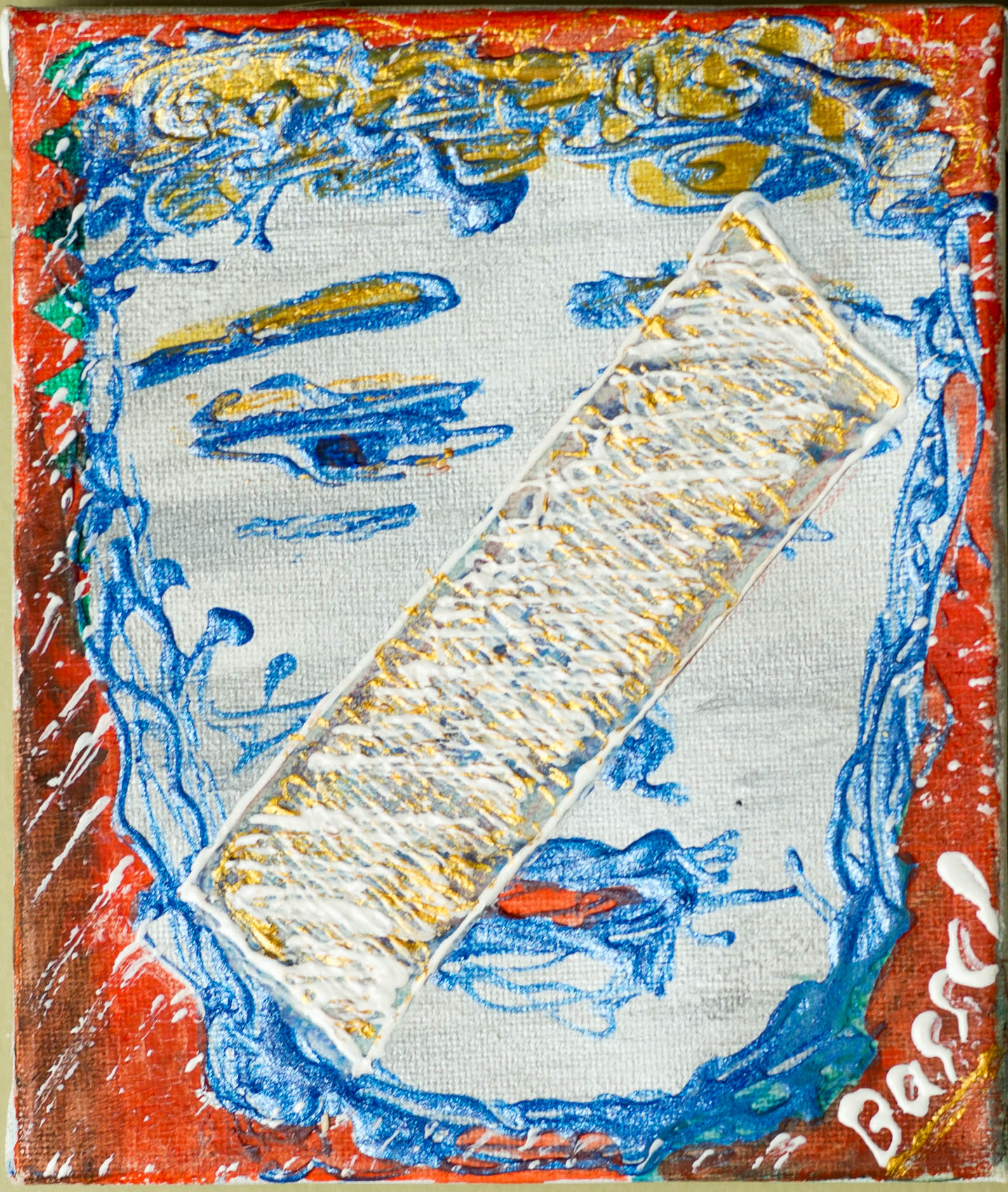
Painting by Bassel Khartabil June 17, 2015, Damascus Central Jail "An attempt to draw a stereotype. This is the stereotype I have in mind for the deformed souls, I have to deal with every day at jail. There are a lot of them."

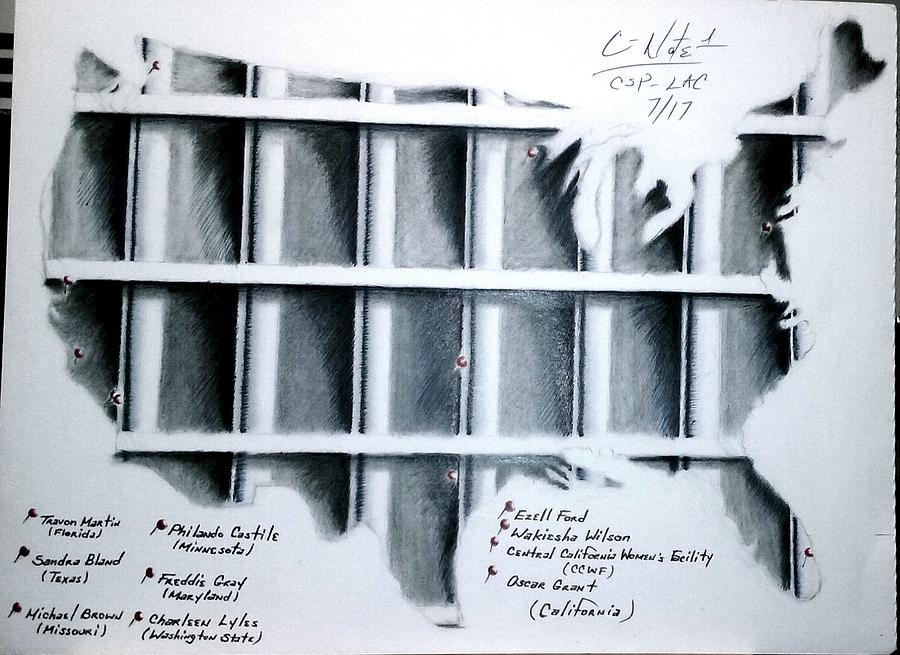
Incarceration Nation, 2017, by Donald "C-Note" Hooker

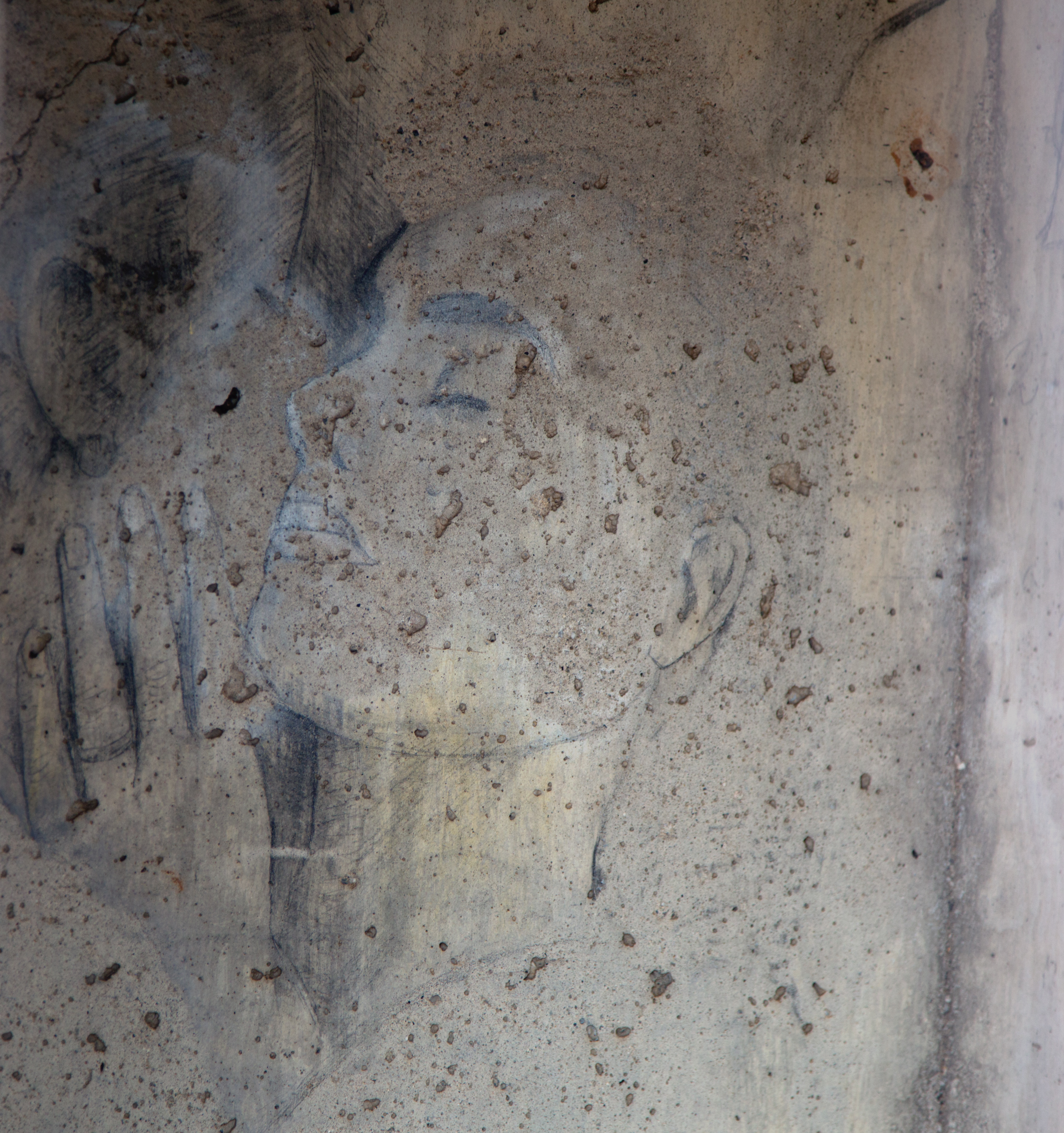
Pencil drawing from a German Prisoner of war on a wall in Camp Beale, California.

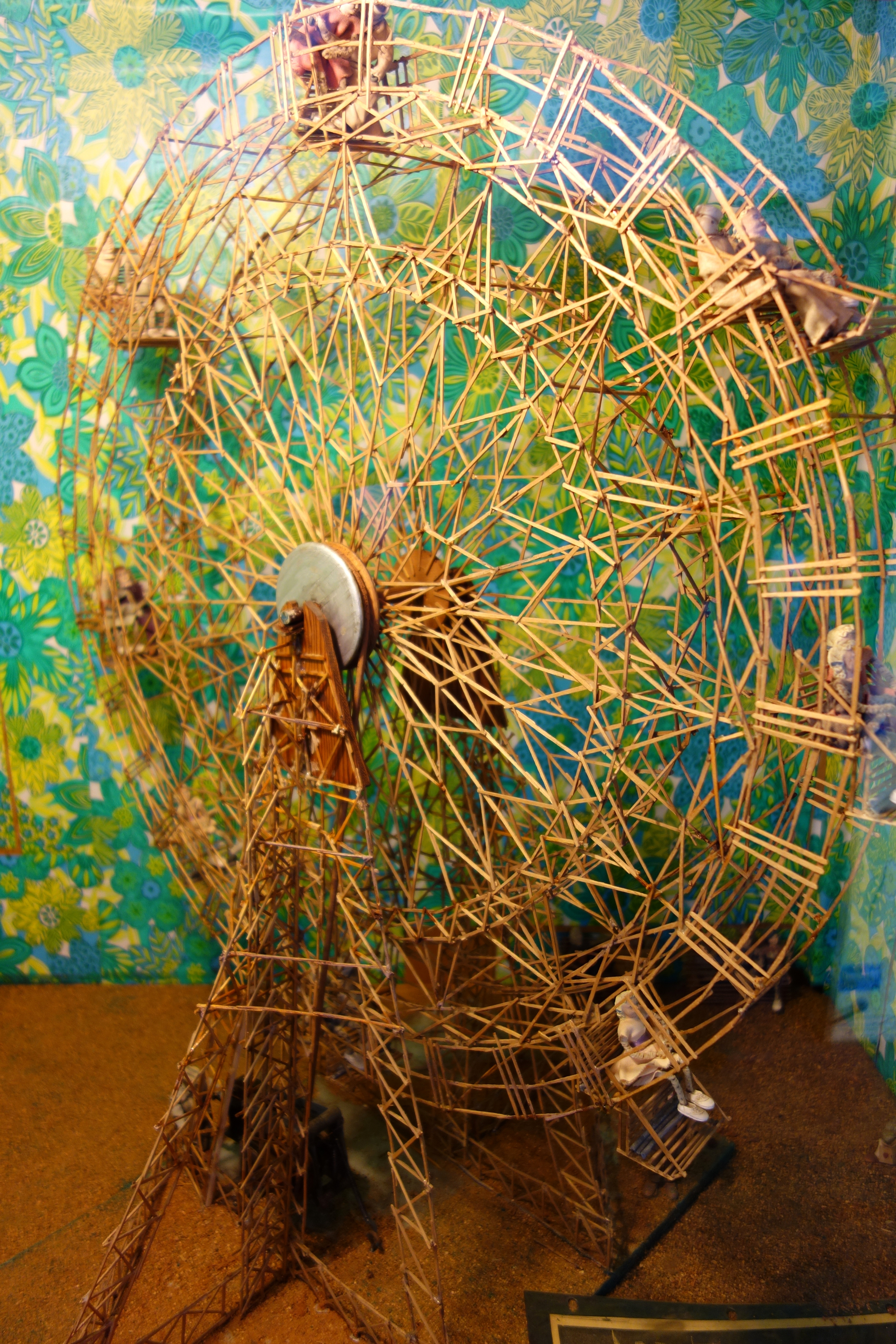
Ferris Wheel, toothpick art made by a San Quentin prison inmate, Musée Mécanique, San Francisco California

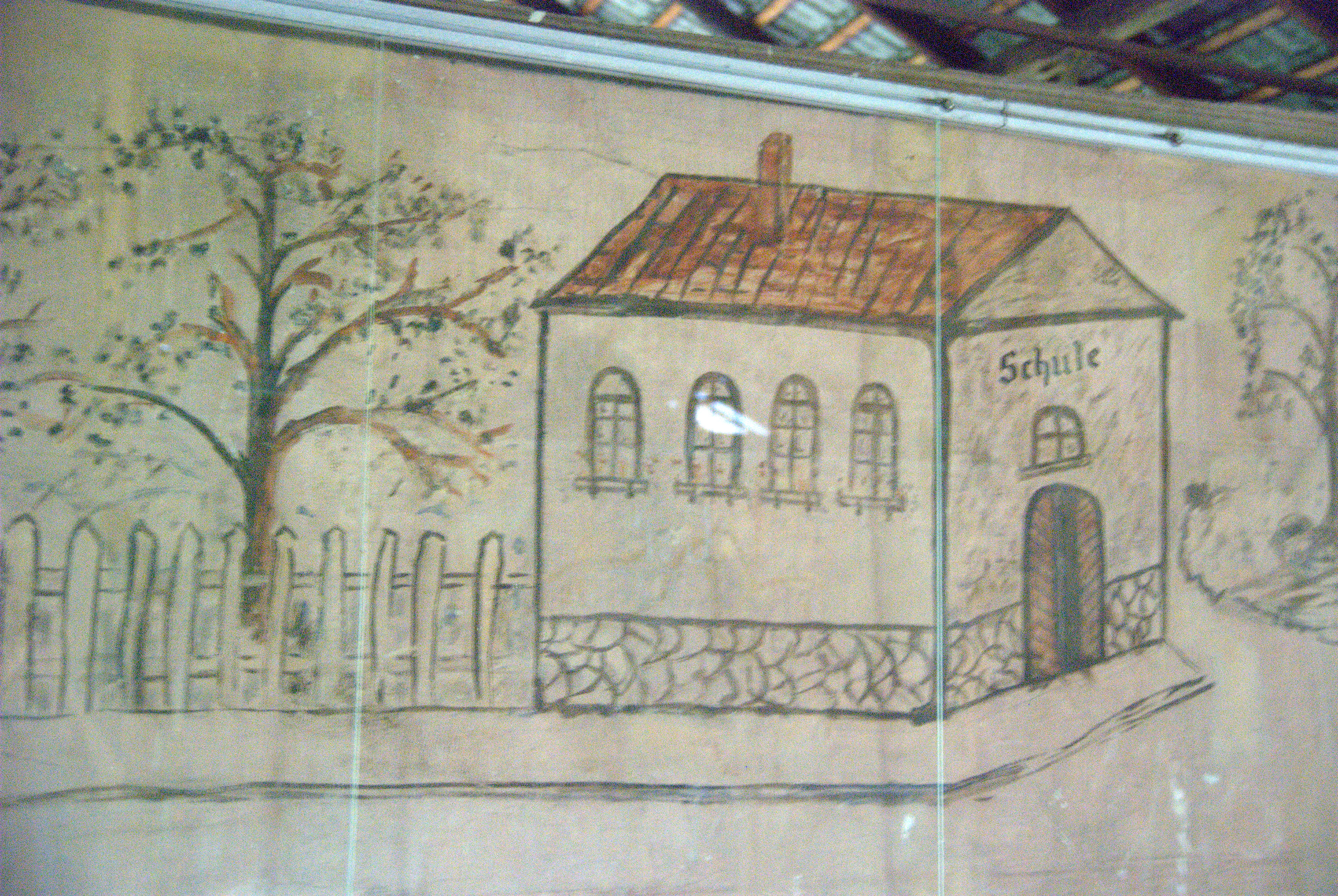
Paintings created by child prisoners on the wall of the prison building in Auschwitz II Birkenau. Image depicts a school.

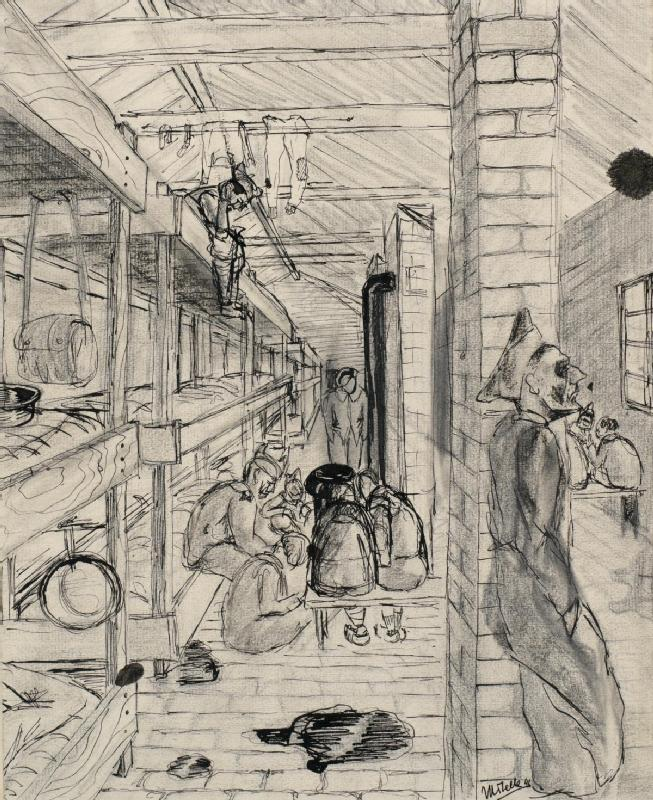
A Pomeranian Prison Camp, 1941 Louis Mitelle. A view down a gangway in a hut in a POW camp. Dejected prisoners in military uniform sit on the bunks which are three levels high and laundry hangs from the beams above. On the floor a group of prisoners sit huddled together in a group.

== See also ==
- Prison tattooing
- Prison literature
