= Quincunx =

Pattern of five points, four in a square or rectangle and a fifth at its center

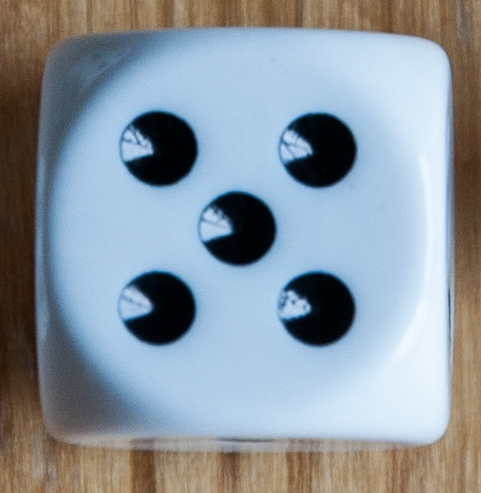
A quincunx of pips on the five-side of a die

A quincunx (/ˈkwɪn.kʌŋks/ KWIN-kunks) is a geometric pattern consisting of five points arranged in a cross, with four of them forming a square or rectangle and a fifth at its center. The same pattern has other names, including "in saltire" or "in cross" in heraldry (depending on the orientation of the outer square), the (two-dimensional) five-point stencil in numerical analysis, and the five dots tattoo. It forms the arrangement of five units in the pattern corresponding to the five-spot on six-sided dice, playing cards, and dominoes. It is represented in Unicode as U+2059 ⁙ FIVE DOT PUNCTUATION or (for the die pattern) U+2684 ⚄ DIE FACE-5.

== Historical origins of the name ==
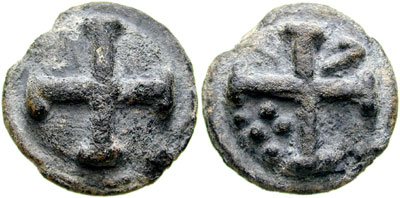
A quincunx coin

Portuguese shield

The quincunx was originally a coin issued by the Roman Republic c. 211–200 BC, whose value was five twelfths (quinque and uncia) of an as, the Roman standard bronze coin. On the Roman quincunx coins, the value was sometimes indicated by a pattern of five dots or pellets. However, these dots were not always arranged in a quincunx pattern.

The Oxford English Dictionary (OED) dates the first appearances of the Latin word in English as 1545 and 1574 ("in the sense 'five-twelfths of a pound or as'"; i.e. 100 old pence). The first citation for a geometric meaning, as "a pattern used for planting trees", dates from 1606. The OED also cites a 1647 reference to the German astronomer Kepler for an astronomical/astrological meaning, an angle of 5/12 of a whole circle. When used to describe a tree-planting pattern, the same word can also refer to groups of more than five trees, arranged in a square grid but aligned diagonally to the dimensions of the surrounding plot of land; however, this article considers only five-point patterns and not their extension to larger square grids.

== Examples ==
Quincunx patterns occur in many contexts:

The flag of Solomon Islands features a quincunx of stars.

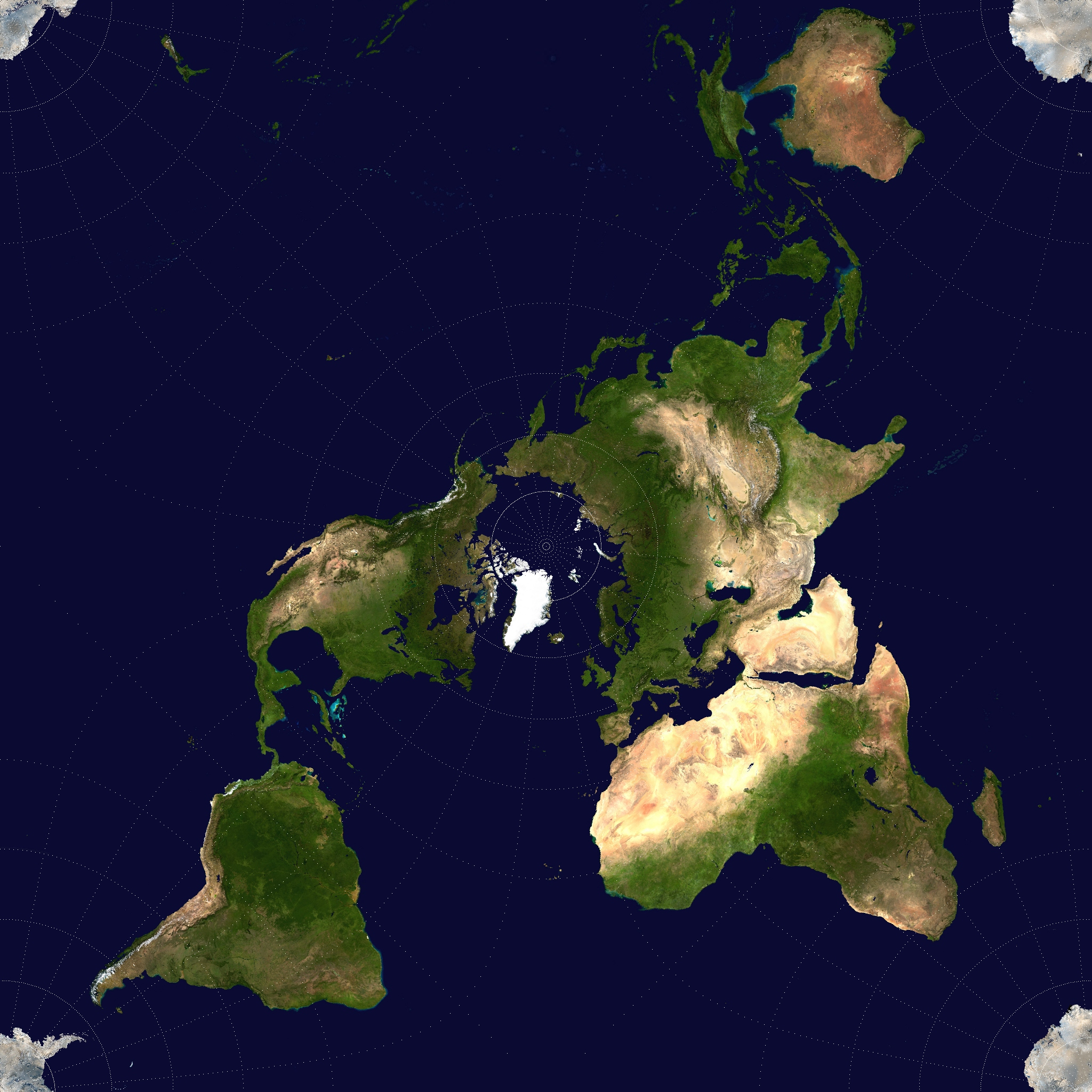
A quincuncial map

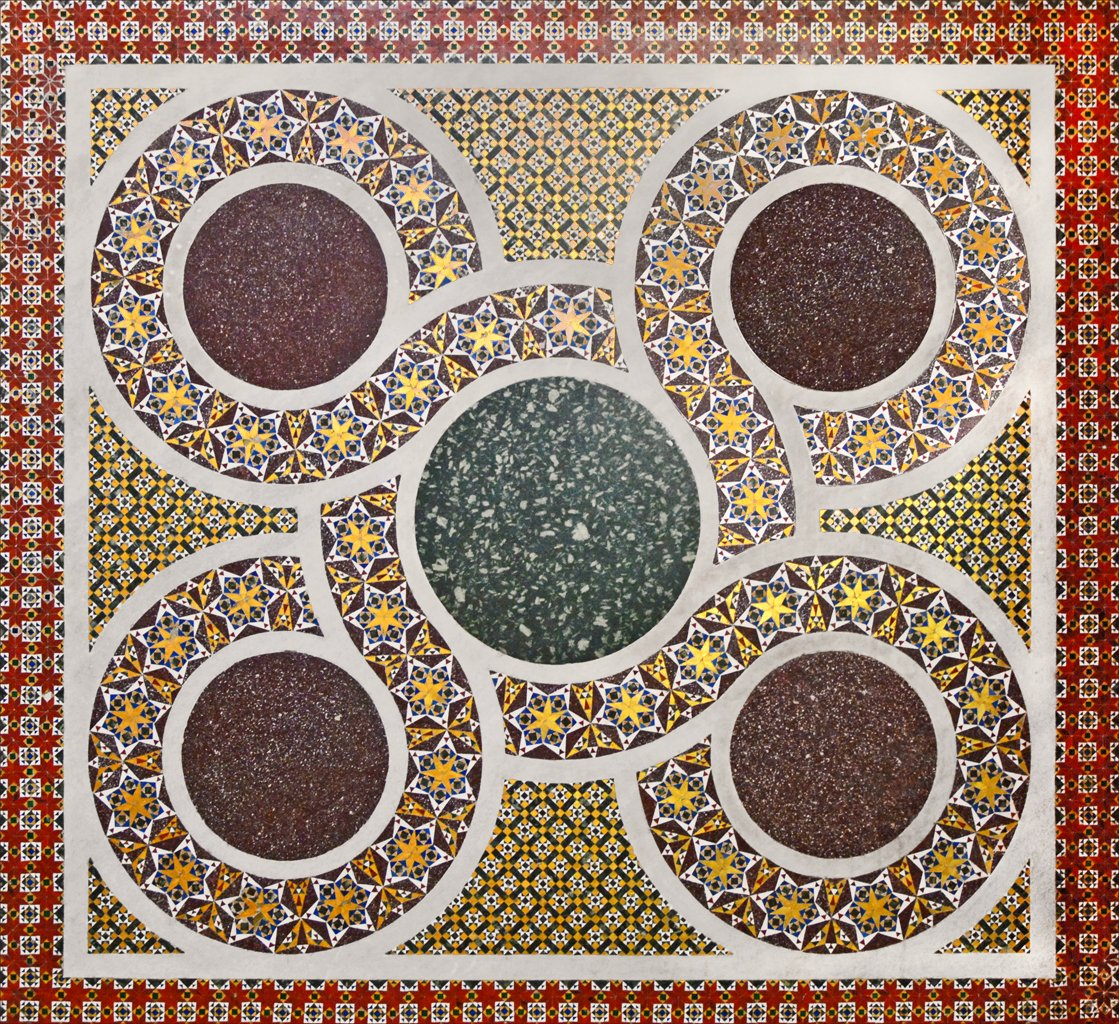
12th-century Cosmatesque mosaic in the Cappella Palatina, Palermo, Sicily

- In heraldry, groups of five elements (charges) are often arranged in a quincunx pattern. This arrangement is called, in heraldic terminology, in saltire for its usual orientation with the sides of the square vertical or horizontal, or in cross when the square is diagonally oriented. The flag of Solomon Islands features this pattern, with its five stars representing the five main island groups in Solomon Islands. Another instance of this pattern occurred in the flag of the 19th-century Republic of Yucatán, where it signified the five departments into which the republic was divided. The coat of arms of Portugal includes both orientations of the same patterns, nested within each other.
- On the ancient Greek coin pentonkion.
- On the fifth side of a die (⚄).
- On a five-valued end of a domino (🂋).
- Quincunxes are used in modern computer graphics as a pattern for multisample anti-aliasing. Quincunx antialiasing samples scenes at the corners and centers of each pixel. These five sample points, in the shape of a quincunx, are combined to produce each displayed pixel. However, samples at the corner points are shared with adjacent pixels, so the number of samples needed is only twice the number of displayed pixels.
- In numerical analysis, the quincunx pattern describes the two-dimensional five-point stencil, a sampling pattern used to derive finite difference approximations to derivatives. The five points of the five-point stencil are arranged directly above, below, and to the two sides of the center point, rather than (as in quincunx sampling) diagonally with respect to it.
- In Khmer architecture, the towers of a temple, such as Angkor Wat, are sometimes arranged in a quincunx to represent the five peaks of Mount Meru.
- A quincunx is one of the quintessential designs of Cosmatesque inlay stonework.
- A quincuncial map is a conformal map projection that maps the poles of the sphere to the centre and four corners of a square, thus forming a quincunx.
- The points on each face of a unit cell of a face-centred cubic lattice form a quincunx.
- The quincunx as a tattoo is known as the five dots tattoo. It has been variously interpreted as a fertility symbol, a reminder of sayings on how to treat women or police, a recognition symbol among the Romani people, a group of close friends, standing alone in the world, or time spent in prison (with the outer four dots representing the prison walls and the inner dot representing the prisoner). Thomas Edison, whose many inventions included an electric pen which later became the basis of a tattooing machine created by Samuel O'Reilly, had this pattern tattooed on his forearm.
- The first two stages of the Saturn V super heavy-lift rocket had engines in a quincunx arrangement.
- A baseball diamond forms a quincunx with the four bases and the pitcher's mound.

== Literary and symbolic references ==
Various literary works use or refer to the quincunx pattern:

- Quincunx (1564) was the name of the political treatise by a Polish-Ruthenian writer Stanisław Orzechowski: here, the five points symbolized five pillars of Polish state, with the Church at the very top.
- The Garden of Cyrus, or The Quincuncial Lozenge, or Network Plantations of the Ancients, naturally, artificially, mystically considered, is an essay by Sir Thomas Browne, published in 1658. Browne elaborates upon evidence of the quincunx pattern in art, nature and mystically as evidence of "the wisdom of God". Although writing about the quincunx in its geometric meaning, he may have been influenced by English astrology, as the astrological meaning of "quincunx" (unrelated to the pattern) was introduced by the astronomer Kepler in 1604. The Victorian critic Edmund Gosse complained that "gathering his forces it is Quincunx, Quincunx, all the way until the very sky itself is darkened with revolving Chess-boards", while conceding that "this radically bad book contains some of the most lovely paragraphs which passed from an English pen during the seventeenth Century".
- James Joyce uses the term in "Grace", a short story in Dubliners of 1914, to describe the seating arrangement of five men in a church service. Lobner argues that in this context the pattern serves as a symbol both of the wounds of Christ and of the Greek cross.
- Lawrence Durrell's novel sequence The Avignon Quintet is arranged in the form of a quincunx, according to the author; the final novel in the sequence is called Quinx, the plot of which includes the discovery of a quincunx of stones.
- The Quincunx is the title of a lengthy and elaborate novel by Charles Palliser set in 19th-century England, published in 1989; the pattern appears in the text as a heraldic device, and is also reflected in the structure of the book.
- In the first chapter of The Rings of Saturn, W. G. Sebald's narrator cites Browne's writing on the quincunx. The quincunx in turn becomes a model for the way in which the rest of the novel unfolds.
- Séamus Heaney describes Ireland's historical provinces as together forming a quincunx, as the Irish word for province cúige (literally: "fifth part") also explicates. The five provinces of Ireland were Ulster (north), Leinster (east), Connacht (west), Munster (south) and Meath (center, and now a county within Leinster). More specifically, in his essay Frontiers of Writing, Heaney creates an image of five towers forming a quincunx pattern within Ireland, one tower for each of the five provinces, each having literary significance.
- Early African American scientist Benjamin Banneker describes a dream in which he is asked to measure the shape of the soul after death. The answer is "quincunx". Research locates his ancestry in Senegal, where the quincunx is a common religious symbol.
