= Ink Master season 15 =

Fifteenth season of reality competition series, Ink Master

Ink Master
- Season 15
- Promotional poster featuring host Joel Madden and judges Nikko Hurtado, Ryan Ashley, and DJ Tambe
- Hosted by: Joel Madden
- Judges: Ryan Ashley; Nikko Hurtado; DJ Tambe
- No. of contestants: 15
- Winner: Bobby Johnson
- No. of episodes: 10

Release
- Original network: Paramount+
- Original release: November 1 – December 20, 2023

Season chronology
- ← Previous; Season 14 Next → OGs vs Young Guns

The fifteenth season of tattoo reality competition show, Ink Master was announced on September 28, 2023. It premiered on November 1, 2023, with the first three episodes on Paramount+ and the following episodes being released weekly. Good Charlotte vocalist Joel Madden returns as host, while season 8 winner Ryan Ashley and Nikko Hurtado return as judges. Three time champion, DJ Tambe, joins the judging panel replacing Ami James.

Like the previous season, artists compete against each other for the title of Ink Master as well as a $250,000 cash prize. The season contains 15 new artists competing, making it the first season since the twelfth season to not feature any returning veterans competing, and were revealed on October 17, 2023. Twelve of the fifteen artists are chosen and split into three teams of four, coached either by Ashley, Hurtado, or Tambe. Dave Navarro did not return as the "Master of Chaos", making this the first season of the series he is absent from, citing health issues due to long COVID-19 as reasoning for his departure. The season also saw the series' 200th episode.

Due to sexual assault allegations, all images featuring Glenn Cuzen have been removed, including all episode appearances and from the season's introduction credits as of February 2024.

Bobby Johnson was the winner of the season, with Freddie Albrighton being the runner-up.

== Judging and ranking ==
=== Judging panel ===
The judging panel is a table of four primary judges. The judges make their final decision by voting to see who had best tattoo of the day, and who goes home.

=== Jury of Ink Masters ===
A jury of past winners appear in the finale to help determine the finale's top two artists. They also gave their critiques on the final Master Canvases. Ultimately, each of them cast a vote on who they thought should be the winner of the season, and the majority vote is tallied as one collective vote.

== Contestants ==
The first episode featured 15 artists competing to be one of the 12 artists that were split into three teams of 4. Each team is coached by the three judges, Ryan Ashley, Nikko Hurtado, and DJ Tambe. The tattoos were ranked from highest to lowest, and one by one, the artists were able to choose what team they wanted to be on in the order of their ranking. The three lowest ranked artists were eliminated and did not get a spot on a team.

In the fifth episode, the Top 7 artists shuffled teams, but the judges chose who they wanted on their team instead.

Names, experience, and cities stated are at time of filming.

Contestant Name	Years of experience	Hometown	Outcome
Bobby Johnson	13	San Diego, California	Winner
Freddie Albrighton	9	Stourbridge	Runner-up
Jon Mesa	16	New York City, New York	Third Place
Jozzy Camacho	11	New York City, New York	4th place
Bryan Black	9	Fullerton, California	5th place
Sydney Dyer	10	Calgary, Canada	6th place
Charlene Ngo	12	Anaheim, California	7th place
David Martinez	4	Pennsauken, New Jersey	8th place
Jenna Kerr	19	Stoke-on-Trent	9th place
Koral Ladna	6	Ukraine	10th place
Glenn Cuzen	20	Reading, Berkshire	11th place
Jessica Valentine	10	Brooklyn, New York	12th place
Dave Patel	7	Long Island, New York	13th place
Aaron Davis-Holloway	4	Atlanta, Georgia	14th place
Joel Mejia	7	Manteca, California	15th place

=== Chosen ===
Team Ryan
Bryan Black (Note: Contestant was originally on Team Nikko.)
Bobby Johnson (Note: Contestant was originally on Team DJ.)
Jenna Kerr
David Martinez
Jessica Valentine

Team Nikko
Freddie Albrighton
Glenn Cuzen
Koral Ladna
Charlene Ngo

Team DJ
Jozzy Camacho (Note: Contestant was originally on Team Ryan.)
Sydney Dyer
Jon Mesa

=== Not chosen ===
Contestant Name
Aaron Davis-Holloway
Joel Mejia
Dave Patel

== Contestant progress ==
Indicates the contestant was a part of Team DJ. (Note: On episode 5, teams are shuffled. Contestants who were not eliminated could be recruited to a different team.)

Indicates the contestant was a part of Team Nikko.

Indicates the contestant was a part of Team Ryan.

Contestant	Episode								
Contestant	2	3 (Note: None of the contestants impressed the judges enough to determine a winner.)	4	5 (Note: Bobby, Freddie, and Jon were ranked amongst the Top 3 in the Elimination Tattoo, securing their spots on the new teams. Charlene, Bryan, Jozzy, and Sydney defeated David in the Face-Off Tattoo.)	6	7	8	9	10
Bobby Johnson	SAFE	SAFE	WIN	TOP3	BTM4	BTM3	TOP3	WIN	Winner
Freddie Albrighton	WIN	SAFE	LOW	WIN	BTM4	WIN	TOP3	ADV	Runner-up
Jon Mesa	SAFE	SAFE	TOP2	TOP3	BTM4	SAFE	WIN	ADV	Eliminated
Jozzy Camacho	BTM3	SAFE	BTM3	BTM5	WIN	BTM3	BTM2	ELIM	
Bryan Black	SAFE	BTM4	LOW	BTM5	TOP2	HIGH	ELIM		
Sydney Dyer	HIGH	BTM4	BTM3	BTM5	SAFE	ELIM			
Charlene Ngo	SAFE	SAFE	SAFE	BTM5	ELIM				
David Martinez	SAFE	SAFE	SAFE	ELIM					
Jenna Kerr	LOW	SAFE	ELIM						
Koral Ladna	SAFE	ELIM							
Glenn Cuzen	BTM3	ELIM							
Jessica Valentine	ELIM								

The contestant won Ink Master.
The contestant was the runner-up.
The contestant was eliminated during the finale.
The contestant advanced to the finale.
The contestant won Best Tattoo of the Day.
The contestant was ranked at the top by the judges during the Blind Critique.
The contestant was among the top.
The contestant received positive critiques.
The contestant received negative critiques.
The contestant was in the bottom.
The contestant was eliminated from the competition.

== Episodes ==
No. overall	No. in season	Title	Original release date
197	1	"The New Ink Class"	November 1, 2023
Elimination Tattoo: Fifteen brand new artists have 6 hours to tattoo what they want in order to secure a spot on one of the teams. There are only 12 shops available, so three artists will be eliminated immediately. Those twelve artists will be split into three teams, coached by Ryan Ashley, Nikko Hurtado, or DJ Tambe. The tattoos will be ranked and one by one, the artists will be able to choose their coach in order of their ranking. The three lowest ranked will be eliminated. Bobby Johnson was ranked the highest and chose first. There was a tie between Bryan Black and Dave Patel, but the episode was left on a cliffhanger, so the last artist who secured a spot was not revealed.; Eliminated: Aaron Davis-Holloway & Joel Mejia
198	2	"Skull & Bones"	November 1, 2023
The final artist who secured the last spot on Nikko's team was revealed. The teams are now set.: Eliminated: Dave Patel; Skill of the Week: Artistry; Flash Challenge: For the first flash challenge of the season, the teams must work together an illuminated work of art using colored pegs. They have 5 hours to place the ultraviolet pegs to create a masterpiece, which will them be lit up with a blacklight.; Winners: Team DJ; Elimination Tattoo: Artists must tattoo a skull.; Best Tattoo of the Day: Freddie Albrighton; Bottom: Glenn Cuzen, Jozzy Camacho, & Jessica Valentine; Eliminated: Jessica Valentine
199	3	"Put Me In, Coach!"	November 1, 2023
There will be a double elimination this episode.: Skill of the Week: Adaptability; Flash Challenge: The coaches must compete against each other and design a tattoo with Joel as the canvas. Their design must fit with his current tattoos, but must reflect on the person he is today. Joel will pick his favorite design between the three coaches, but will pick blind. The winning coach will tattoo Joel.; Winner: Team DJ; Elimination Tattoo: The artists must tattoo a 360 degree tattoo, meaning it must wrap around the entire body part. Everyone had issues in their tattoos, so the judges determined there is no best tattoo of the day.; Bottom: Bryan Black, Sydney Dyer, & Koral Ladna; Eliminated: Koral Ladna
200	4	"Don't Fork It Up"	November 8, 2023
Skill of the Week: Creativity; Flash Challenge: The teams must work together to create a piece of art using silverware.; Winner: Team Ryan; Elimination Tattoo: The artists must showcase their creativity by tattooing a hybrid beast in full color. Jenna's strategy against Team DJ backfired when she accidentally mixed up the skull picks.; Best Tattoo of the Day: Bobby Johnson; Bottom: Jozzy Camacho, Sydney Dyer, and Jenna Kerr; Eliminated: Jenna Kerr
201	5	"Teams Transformed"	November 15, 2023
The Top 8 artists shuffle teams, but the judges get to pick who they want on their teams. There is no Flash Challenge.: Skill of the Week: Ingenuity; Elimination Tattoo: Artists must tattoo transforming tattoos. The tattoo must move with the body and they will be judged blind, so the coaches cannot help their respective teams. The judges pick the top three artists to join their team. The judges also cannot hear what the canvases want. In reverse order of the rankings in the first challenge, the artists get to choose their canvas.; Top Three: Freddie Albrighton, Bobby Johnson, and Jon Mesa; Bottom: Bryan Black, Jozzy Camacho, Sydney Dyer, David Martinez, and Charlene Ngo; Face-Off Tattoo: The remaining artists must tattoo a Japanese full color tiger to avoid elimination.; Eliminated: David Martinez
202	6	"Saddle Up, Buttercup"	November 22, 2023
Skill of the Week: Detail; Flash Challenge: The teams must turn a garage door into a 3-D mural using paintbrushes and paint.; Winner: Team Nikko; Elimination Tattoo: The artists must tattoo a Western tattoo to show detail.; Guest Judge: Jefferson White; Best Tattoo of the Day: Jozzy Camacho; Bottom: Freddie Albrighton, Bobby Johnson, Charlene Ngo, and Jon Mesa; Eliminated: Charlene Ngo
203	7	"Fight Fire With Fire"	November 29, 2023
Skill of the Week: Composition; Flash Challenge: The teams must use blowtorches, sanders, and engraving tools to create a piece of art on a 3x8-foot piece of copper. They need to heat the copper to change the color and etch their designs into the piece. They also are working in teams of two. Jozzy has the power to choose from Team DJ to work with Freddie, the sole member on Team Nikko. The coaches cannot consult with their teams.; Winner: Team Ryan; Elimination Tattoo: The artists must tattoo science tattoos to show composition.; Best Tattoo of the Day: Freddie Albrighton; Bottom: Bobby Johnson, Jozzy Camacho, and Sydney Dyer; Eliminated: Sydney Dyer
204	8	"Competition Shattered"	December 6, 2023
Skill of the Week: Precision; Flash Challenge: For the final Flash Challenge of the season, the artists had to shatter glass to make a piece of art. There were no teams or coaches, so it was every man or woman for themselves.; Winner: Jon Mesa; Elimination Tattoo: Artists were tested on precision with New School Portraits.; Best Tattoo of the Day: Jon Mesa; Bottom: Bryan Black & Jozzy Camacho; Eliminated: Bryan Black
205	9	"Instant Karma"	December 13, 2023
Elimination Tattoo: The final four had the opportunity to call the shots on each other, including the style and subject matter. The artists also cannot call out who called them out. Because Jon won Best Tattoo of the Day in the last elimination tattoo, he had the opportunity to call out the first shot on the artist of his choice, which was Freddie with a traditional Japanese dragon. Freddie then called out Bobby with color-realism landscapes, leaving Bobby to call out Jozzy on default with a color-realistic spirit bear and Jozzy to call out Jon with a color-realistic lady face with elderly features. Their canvases were completely open and randomly assigned, and they had six hours to complete their tattoos.; Karma Tattoo: In a twist of events, the artists also had six hours to tattoo the same style and subject they called out the following day. Three artists would advance to the finale, while one would be packing their machines based on both tattoos.; Advanced: Bobby Johnson, Freddie Albrighton, and Jon Mesa; Eliminated: Jozzy Camacho; Finale Tattoo: Bobby, Freddie and Jon must tattoo three 12-hour single-session leg tattoos to get to the finale. The subject and style of the first session were up to them, but for the second session, they had to tattoo a black and gray illustrative female and for the third session, they had to tattoo Japanese snakes. The canvases were open and randomly assigned.
206	10	"Fifteen’s Finale"	December 20, 2023
A jury consisting of 5 past Ink Masters are brought in to choose one of the top two artists and also to give their critiques to the Master Canvases. The judges choose the other artist and whoever is not chosen is eliminated.: Jury of Ink Masters: Shane O'Neill (season 1), Joey Hamilton (season 3), Anthony Michaels (season 7), Bubba Irwin (season 9), and Josh Payne (season 10); Jury of Ink Masters' Pick: Bobby Johnson; Judges' Pick: Freddie Albrighton; Before revealing the last master canvas, videos of the families and partners of the finalists were shown. The Jury each cast a vote between the top two and collectively will be tallied as the fifth vote.: Third Place: Jon Mesa; Runner-Up: Freddie Albrighton; Winner: Bobby Johnson

== No More Ink ==
Like the previous season, as contestants are eliminated, each give an exit interview about their career and experience on the show. Each episode of No More Ink is posted on the show's official YouTube channel after a contestant is eliminated from the competition. Glenn Cuzen and Jenna Kerr were the only two artists who did not do an exit interview. It is once again hosted by judge, Ryan Ashley.

- Episode 1: Joel Mejia & Aaron Davis-Holloway (aired: November 1, 2023)
- Episode 2: Dave Patel & Jessica Valentine (aired November 2, 2023)
- Episode 3: Koral Ladna (aired November 8, 2023)
- Episode 4: David Martinez (aired November 16, 2023)
- Episode 5: Charlene Ngo (aired November 23, 2023)
- Episode 6: Sydney Dyer (aired November 29, 2023)
- Episode 7: Bryan Black (aired December 6, 2023)
- Episode 8: Jozzy Camacho (aired December 13, 2023)
- Episode 9: Bobby Johnson (aired December 20, 2023)
- Episode 10: Freddie Albrighton (aired December 21, 2023)
- Episode 11: Jon Mesa (aired December 22, 2023)
