= Ink Master season 17 =

Seventeenth season of reality competition series, Ink Master

Ink Master: Hometown Heroes
- Season 17
- Promotional poster featuring judges and contestants
- Hosted by: Joel Madden
- Judges: Ryan Ashley; Nikko Hurtado; DJ Tambe
- No. of contestants: 15
- Winner: Matt Mooney
- No. of episodes: 10

Release
- Original network: Paramount+
- Original release: October 29 – December 17, 2025

Season chronology
- ← Previous; OGs vs Young Guns

Ink Master: Hometown Heroes is the seventeenth season of tattoo reality competition show, Ink Master which was announced on October 1, 2025. It premiered on October 29, 2025 with the first three episodes on Paramount+, with the rest of the episodes being released weekly. Good Charlotte vocalist Joel Madden returns as host, while season 8 winner Ryan Ashley, Nikko Hurtado and three-time champion, DJ Tambe, return as judges.

Like the previous season, artists competed against each other for the title of Ink Master as well as a $250,000 cash prize. The season sees 15 artists representing their hometowns to bring home the crown, putting their reputations and regional pride on the line. The contestants participating were announced ahead of the season premiere. This is the second season to have four finalists instead of three.

Matt Mooney was crowned the winner of the season, being the first Australian contestant to win the title, with Isnard Barbosa as the runner-up.

== Judging and ranking ==
=== Judging panel ===
The judging panel is a table of four primary judges. The judges make their final decision by voting to see who had best tattoo of the day, and who goes home.

=== Elimination Tattoo Winner's pick ===
The artist who wins Best Tattoo of the Day will help the judges choose an artist for elimination.

== Contestants ==
Names, experience, and cities stated are at time of filming.

| Contestant Name | Years of experience | Hometown | Outcome |
|---|---|---|---|
| Matt Mooney | 17 | Melbourne, Australia | Winner |
| Isnard Barbosa | 20 | Dublin, Ireland | Runner-up |
| Luka Lajoie | 18 | Montreal, Canada | 3rd place |
| Seth Holmes | 12 | Pittsburgh, Pennsylvania | 4th place |
| Keahi Ikeda | ? | Honolulu, Hawaii | 5th place |
| Kyra Torres | 6 | Vancouver, Canada | 6th place |
| Boushee Bowie | ? | Tulsa, Oklahoma | 7th place |
| Alli Johnson | 3 | Kansas City, Missouri | 8th place |
| OJ Thomas | ? | Matawan, New Jersey | 9th place |
| Teneile Napoli | ? | Gold Coast, Australia | 10th place |
| Mike Beecher | 4 | Gillette, Wyoming | 11th place |
| Emily Sabrina Estrada | ? | Watford City, North Dakota | 12th place |
| Tyler Jenkins | ? | Orlando, Florida | 13th place |
| Sherri Austria | ? | Los Angeles, California | 14th place |
| Nadia Most | ? | Mashad, Iran | 15th place |

== Contestant progress ==
| Contestant | Episode | | | | | | | | |
| Contestant | 2 | 3 | 4 | 5 | 6 | 7 (Note: Kyra and Matt were tied at the top for Best Tattoo of the Day. Seth and Isnard defeated Boushee in the Face-Off Tattoo.) | 8 | 9 | 10 |
|---|---|---|---|---|---|---|---|---|---|
| Matt Mooney | SAFE | SAFE | WIN | WIN | HIGH | WIN | TOP2 | ADV | Winner |
| Isnard Barbosa | SAFE | HIGH | HIGH | HIGH | TOP2 | BTM3 | HIGH | ADV | Runner-up |
| Luka Lajoie | SAFE | SAFE | TOP2 | SAFE | LOW | TOP4 | WIN | ADV | Eliminated |
| Seth Holmes | SAFE | SAFE | SAFE | HIGH | WIN | BTM3 | BTM3 | ADV | Eliminated |
| Keahi Ikeda | SAFE | SAFE | BTM3 | BTM4 | BTM3 | TOP4 | BTM3 | ELIM | |
| Kyra Torres | SAFE | WIN | HIGH | BTM4 | SAFE | WIN | ELIM | | |
| Boushee Bowie | SAFE | SAFE | SAFE | SAFE | BTM3 | ELIM | | | |
| Alli Johnson | SAFE | BTM3 | SAFE | SAFE | ELIM | | | | |
| OJ Thomas | SAFE | LOW | BTM3 | ELIM | | | | | |
| Teneile Napoli | SAFE | HIGH | HIGH | ELIM | | | | | |
| Mike Beecher | SAFE | BTM3 | ELIM | | | | | | |
| Emily Sabrina Estrada | SAFE | ELIM | | | | | | | |
| Tyler Jenkins | ELIM | | | | | | | | |
| Sherri Austria | ELIM | | | | | | | | |
| Nadia Most | ELIM | | | | | | | | |

The contestant won Ink Master.
The contestant was the runner-up.
The contestant was eliminated during the finale.
The contestant advanced to the finale.
The contestant won Best Tattoo of the Day.
The contestant won the Tattoo Marathon.
The contestant won their Head-to-Head challenge.
The contestant was ranked at the top by the judges during the Blind Critique.
The contestant was among the top.
The contestant received positive critiques.
The contestant received negative critiques.
The contestant was in the bottom.
The contestant was eliminated from the competition.
The contestant quit the competition.
The contestant was put in the bottom by the artist who won Best Tattoo of the Day.
The contestant was eliminated from the competition.
The contestant was put in the bottom by the artist who won Best Tattoo of the Day and was eliminated from the competition.
The contestant returned as a guest in the episode.

== Episodes ==
| No. overall | No. in season | Title | Original release date |
|---|---|---|---|
| 215 | 1 | "Hometown Throwdown" | October 29, 2025 |
Fifteen new artists compete for the title of Ink Master and $250,000, while representing their respective hometowns. There are only 12 shops and to earn their spot, they have to compete in a three round test.: Whiteboard Challenge – Round 1: Artists test their drawing skills on a white board to create a tattoo design in three hours. The judges will decide who gets to tattoo their designs on skin. Artists chosen from the first round have five hours to tattoo their whiteboard designs in order to secure their shop. Artists that were not selected must compete in the second round.; Chosen: Keahi Ikeda, Luka Lajoie, Alli Johnson, Matt Mooney, Isnard Barbosa, Emily Sabrina Estrada, and Kyra Torres; Winners: Alli Johnson and Keahi Ikeda
| 216 | 2 | "Back to the Drawing Board" | October 29, 2025 |
There are ten shops left, with thirteen artists left to compete for a spot.: Realism Tattoo – Round 2: To earn a shop, artists have six hours to tattoo a realistic animal that represents their hometown.; Winners: Luka Lajoie, OJ Thomas, Teneile Napoli, Kyra Torres, Matt Mooney, Boushee Bowie, and Mike Beecher.; Elimination Tattoo – Round 3: In their final chance to secure a spot, artists must tattoo their white board drawing from round one.; Winners: Isnard Barbosa, Seth Holmes, and Emily Sabrina Estrada; Eliminated: Nadia Most, Sherri Austria, and Tyler Jenkins
| 217 | 3 | "Gut Check" | October 29, 2025 |
Skill of the Week: Contrast; Flash Challenge: Artists must paint with multi colored smoke grenades to show contrast on an 8-by-12 foot canvas. The teams are divided by three teams of four. Emily, Seth and Isnard get the power to choose their teams.; Winners: Team Isnard (Isnard Barbosa, Teneile Napoli, Mike Beecher, and Matt Mooney); Elimination Tattoo: Artists must tattoo glitter tattoos on the stomach. All canvases get tattooed on the same part of the body throughout the season and cannot be moved. Each week, the artist who wins Best Tattoo of the Day will help the judges choose an artist for elimination.; Best Tattoo of the Day: Kyra Torres; Winner's Pick: Mike Beecher; Bottom: Alli Johnson and Emily Sabrina Estrada; Eliminated: Emily Sabrina Estrada
| 217 | 4 | "Bottled Up" | November 5, 2025 |
Skill of the Week: Artistry; Flash Challenge: Artists must make a 3D sculpture using aluminum. One team of five artists and one team of six artists must compete against one another. Alli and Mike get the power to pick their teams and they can pick any artist they want except for Kyra. Once all the artists are chosen, Kyra herself gets to choose what team she wants to be on.; Winners: Team Mike (Mike Beecher, Matt Mooney, Luka Lajoie, Teneile Napoli, and OJ Thomas); Elimination Tattoo: To test their artistry, artists must tattoo bottles on the calf. All human canvases are people of color. Alli's canvas walked due to not being satisfied with her design and she ended up tattooing herself.; Best Tattoo of the Day: Matt Mooney; Winner's Pick: Keahi Ikeda; Bottom: Mike Beecher and OJ Thomas; Eliminated: Mike Beecher
| 218 | 5 | "It's a Marathon, Not a Sprint" | November 12, 2025 |
This episode will have a double elimination.: Skill of the Week: Adaptability; Tattoo Marathon: Artists have six hours to create 4-by-4 inch flash designs. They then have 12 hours to tattoo as many of those designs. They must tattoo these designs on tough spots such as the head, kneecap, armpits, and the butt. All of the tattoos will be judged blind and as one body of work. The quantity and quality of the tattoos matter. As a group, the artists tattooed a total of 71 tattoos. Seth and Isnard tied for the second highest ranked tattoos.; Winner: Matt Mooney; Bottom: Keahi Ikeda, Kyra Torres, OJ Thomas, and Teneile Napoli; Eliminated: Teneile Napoli and OJ Thomas
| 219 | 6 | "No Day at the Beach" | November 19, 2025 |
Skill of the Week: Detail; Flash Challenge: Artists must create a colorful masterpiece out of the pavement using sand. Artists will work in two teams of four, each team headed by Kyra and Keahi. They get to choose their teams for the challenge.; Winners: Team Keahi (Keahi Ikeda, Boushee Bowie, Isnard Barbosa, and Seth Holmes); Elimination Tattoo: Artists must tattoo melting tattoos to show detail on the upper arm.; Best Tattoo of the Day: Seth Holmes; Winner's Pick: Alli Johnson; Bottom: Boushee Bowie and Keahi Ikeda; Eliminated: Alli Johnson
| 220 | 7 | "All Scars Will Heal" | November 26, 2025 |
Skill of the Week: Ingenuity; Elimination Tattoo: Artists must transform a scar. The tattoos will be judged blind. There was a tie for the highest ranked tattoo. Isnard's tattoo was ranked at the very bottom.; Best Tattoo of the Day: Kyra Torres and Matt Mooney; Bottom: Seth Holmes, Isnard Barbosa, and Boushee Bowie; Face-Off Tattoo: To avoid elimination, the bottom three artists must combine three different subjects into one cohesive subject. Each artist must write down one subject and all of them must incorporate them into their tattoos. They must include a lady face (Seth), a chrysanthemum (Isnard), and a skull (Boushee).; Eliminated: Boushee Bowie
| 221 | 8 | "Signed, Sealed, Delivered, Stamped" | December 3, 2025 |
Skill of the Week: Precision; Flash Challenge: For the final flash challenge this season, artists must use colored packing tape to create a piece of art on plexiglass. Artists will work in teams of two. Kyra and Matt get to pick their teams since they ranked the highest last week. The duos are Kyra and Isnard, Matt and Luka, and Seth and Keahi.; Winner: Matt Mooney and Luka Lajoie; Elimination Tattoo: Artists must tattoo two micro-realistic postage stamps. They must be smaller than 2-by-2 inches on the forearm. Matt and Luka attempted to save Kyra by giving her a black and gray tattoo, but ended up screwing her over.; Best Tattoo of the Day: Luka Lajoie; Winner's Pick: Keahi Ikeda; Bottom: Kyra Torres and Seth Holmes; Eliminated: Kyra Torres
| 222 | 9 | "Tat for Tat" | December 10, 2025 |
Elimination Tattoo: To earn a spot in the finale, the Top 5 must create a line drawing and artists will tattoo the respective work of the artist they call out. Keahi called out Isnard, Isnard called out Matt, Matt called out Seth, which leaves Seth designing for Luka who has to design for Keahi.; Head-to-Head Tattoo: Artists must tattoo the same line drawing by the artist that they were called out by. Four artists will be in the finale rather than the usual three.; Advanced: Isnard Barbosa, Luka Lajoie, Seth Holmes, and Matt Mooney; Eliminated: Keahi Ikeda; Finale Tattoo: To win the title of Ink Master, the finalists must create a 24-hour back piece. In two back-to-back 12-hour sessions, artists may tattoo whatever they want. They also must complete two additional 6-hour tattoos in the style their competitor chooses. Isnard and Luka both chose color illustrative for their Master Canvas, Seth chose American Traditional, and Matt selected Japanese.
| 223 | 10 | "Hometown Hero" | December 17, 2025 |
The finalists reveal their Master Canvases. Joel's brother, Benji, makes a cameo at the beginning of the episode. Last season's winner, James Tex, returns to guest judge. Friends and families of the finalists were shown.: Guest Judge: James Tex; Fourth Place: Seth Holmes; Third Place: Luka Lajoie; Runner-Up: Isnard Barbosa; Winner: Matt Mooney

== No More Ink ==
The official after show, No More Ink, followed the same format as the previous season where past contestants, veteran artists, and various celebrities are interviewed about their careers and opinions on the episode's tattoos by the contestants. The show is hosted by judge Ryan Ashley.

- Episode 1: Jess Hilarious (aired: October 29, 2025)
- Episode 2: Kandy Muse (aired: October 31, 2025)
- Episode 3: Amanda Graves (aired: November 2, 2025)
- Episode 4: The Kid Mero (aired: November 5, 2025)
- Episode 5: Gian Karle (aired: November 13, 2025)
- Episode 6: Natasha Cloud (aired: November 19, 2025)
- Episode 7: DJ Tambe (aired: November 26, 2025)
- Episode 8: Sammy Sullivan (aired: December 3, 2025)
- Episode 9: Chef Bruja (aired: December 10, 2025)
- Episode 10: James Tex (aired: December 17, 2025)
