= Ink Master season 14 =

Ink Master
- Season 14
- Hosted by: Joel Madden
- Judges: Ryan Ashley; Ami James; Nikko Hurtado
- No. of contestants: 14
- Winner: DJ Tambe
- No. of episodes: 10

Release
- Original network: Paramount+
- Original release: September 7 – November 2, 2022

Season chronology
- ← Previous; Turf War Next → Season 15

The 14th season of the tattoo reality competition Ink Master premiered on Paramount+ on September 7, 2022. The season ran for 10 episodes, with the finale premiering on November 2, 2022. Joel Madden, lead vocalist of Good Charlotte, replaced Dave Navarro as the host and judge. Long-time judges Chris Núñez and Oliver Peck were replaced with Ami James, Nikko Hurtado, and Season 8 winner, Ryan Ashley. Season 14 was the first season of the show to have four regular judges.

Ten returning artists and four winning artists from previous seasons competed in season 14 for $250,000 and the title of Ink Master. The artists were announced ahead of the premiere. Navarro appeared as the "Master of Chaos", introducing new twists to the challenges. The season also marks his last appearance on the show.

DJ Tambe won the season, making it his third win. Gian Karle was runner-up, Bob Jones placed third, and Creepy Jason placed fourth.

== Judging and ranking ==
=== Judging panel ===
A judging panel consists of four judges who decide which artist has best tattoo of the day and which artist goes home.

=== Jury of Peers ===
The artists determine which one out of three artists will appear before the judges for elimination.

== Contestants ==
Names, original season, original outcome, and outcome.

| Contestant | Original season(s) | Original outcome(s) | Outcome |
|---|---|---|---|
| DJ Tambe | Season 9 | Winner | Winner |
| Gian Karle | Season 8 | Runner-up | Runner-up |
| Bob Jones | Season 13 | Finalist (Note: Due to COVID-19, there was no winner for Season 13.) | 3rd place |
| Creepy Jason | Season 12 | 3rd place | 4th place |
| Angel Rose | Season 11 | 11th place | 5th place |
| Angel Rose | Season 13 | Finalist | 5th place |
| Anthony Michaels | Season 7 | Winner | 6th place |
| Tony Medellin | Season 11 | Winner | 7th place |
| Katie McGowan | Season 6 | 8th place | 8th place |
| Katie McGowan | Season 9 | Runner-up | 8th place |
| Pon DeMan | Season 12 | 5th place | 9th place |
| Steve Tefft | Season 2 | Winner | 10th place |
| Holli Marie | Season 12 | 7th place | 11th place |
| Hiram Casas | Season 13 | 6th place | 12th place |
| Deanna Smith | Season 10 | 5th place | 13th place |
| Chris Shockley | Season 11 | 6th place | 14th place |

== Contestant progress ==
| Contestant | Episode | | | | | | | | | |
| Contestant | 1 (Note: Bob, Katie, and Holli defeated Chris in the final round of the Tattoo Gauntlet.) | 2 | 3 | 4 (Note: Angel, Pon, and Holli did not match a Master and had to Face-Off, but the episode was left on a cliffhanger, so the result was not revealed.) | 5 (Note: Angel and Pon defeated Holli in the Face-Off tattoo from the previous episode.) | 6 | 7 | 8 | 9 (Note: Anthony was ranked the lowest in the 12 Hour Tattoo, thus eliminating him from the competition. Creepy Jason won the Tattoo Marathon, while Angel & DJ were ranked the lowest. The episode was left on a cliffhanger, so the artist who secured the final spot in the Top Four wasn't revealed.) | 10 (Note: DJ defeated Angel in the tattoo marathon from the previous episode. Angel and Anthony returned to form a jury of peers to vote on who advanced first in the Top Three. Together, they selected DJ.) |
|---|---|---|---|---|---|---|---|---|---|---|
| DJ Tambe | | | | Guest | HIGH | HIGH | WIN | WIN | BTM2 | Winner |
| Gian Karle | SAFE | WIN | SAFE | WIN | LOW | WIN | SAFE | BTM3 | ADV | Runner-up |
| Bob Jones | BTM4 | TOP2 | WIN | WIN | SAFE | TOP3 | HIGH | SAFE | WIN | Eliminated |
| Creepy Jason | SAFE | SAFE | SAFE | WIN | HIGH | SAFE | BTM3 | BTM3 | WIN | Eliminated |
| Angel Rose | SAFE | LOW | BTM3 | BTM3 | WIN | SAFE | HIGH | LOW | BTM2 | ELIM |
| Anthony Michaels | | | | Guest | BTM3 | HIGH | SAFE | SAFE | ELIM | Guest |
| Tony Medellin | | | | Guest | BTM3 | TOP3 | BTM3 | ELIM | | |
| Katie McGowan | BTM4 | BTM3 | SAFE | WIN | HIGH | BTM2 | ELIM | | | |
| Pon DeMan | SAFE | SAFE | HIGH | BTM3 | SAFE | ELIM | | | | |
| Steve Tefft | | | | Guest | ELIM | | | | | |
| Holli Marie | BTM4 | BTM3 | BTM3 | BTM3 | ELIM | | | | | |
| Hiram Casas | SAFE | SAFE | ELIM | | | | | | | |
| Deanna Smith | SAFE | ELIM | | | | | | | | |
| Chris Shockley | ELIM | | | | | | | | | |

The contestant won Ink Master.
The contestant was the runner-up.
The contestant was eliminated during the finale.
The contestant advanced to the finale.
The contestant won the Tattoo Marathon.
The contestant was exempt from the first elimination.
The contestant won Best Tattoo of the Day.
The contestant won their Head-to-Head challenge.
The contestant was among the top.
The contestant received positive critiques.
The contestant received negative critiques.
The contestant was in the bottom.
The contestant was put in the bottom by the Jury of Peers
The contestant was eliminated from the competition.
The contestant was put in the bottom by the Jury of Peers and was eliminated from the competition.
The contestant returned as a guest in the episode.

== Episodes ==
| No. overall | No. in season | Title | Original release date |
|---|---|---|---|
| 187 | 1 | "Legends Return" | September 7, 2022 |
Tattoo Gauntlet: Ten returning artists compete in a 3 round Tattoo Gauntlet. Artists were declared safe each round and did not have to participate in the next round.; Round 1: The three new judges (Ryan Ashley, Ami James, & Nikko Hurtado) each design a line work for the artists to tattoo. The judges then decide if the competitors’ tattoos matched their designs. Gian and Deanna were the only two artists that were saved in the first round.; Safe: Gian Karle and Deanna Smith; Round 2: The artists must tattoo difficult parts of the body such as stomachs, feet, armpits, knee ditches, etc. Dave Navarro, via a television screen, is introduced as the "Master of Chaos", dropping new twists for the challenges. For this twist, the canvases request some of the most weirdest ideas.; Safe: Pon DeMan, Angel Rose, Hiram Casas, and Creepy Jason; Round 3: The third round eventually came down between Bob, Katie, Holli, and Chris. To avoid elimination, they must tattoo a style they did not do in the previous two rounds.; Eliminated: Chris Shockley
| 188 | 2 | "A Work of Art" | September 7, 2022 |
Skill of the Week: Creativity; Flash Challenge: The artists were split into two teams, headed by Pon and Holli, and were challenged to create an image on office windows using only post-it notes.; Winners: Pon DeMan, Gian Karle, Bob Jones, and Hiram Casas; Elimination Tattoo: The artists are challenged to emulate fine arts in their tattoos.; Best Tattoo of the Day: Gian Karle; Bottom: Holli Marie, Katie McGowan, and Deanna Smith; Eliminated: Deanna Smith
| 189 | 3 | "Devil's in the Details" | September 14, 2022 |
Skill of the Week: Detail; Flash Challenge: The artists work in pairs to create an illusion, making the body disappear. The pairs were: Bob and Gian, Holli and Katie, Angel and Pon, Hiram and Creepy Jason. Using blacklight paint, the artists have 4 hours to paint two models to create one blacklight illusion.; Winners: Bob Jones and Gian Karle; Elimination Tattoo: The artists have 5 hours to tattoo pin-ups of animals.; Best Tattoo of the Day: Bob Jones; Bottom: Angel Rose, Hiram Casas, and Holli Marie; Eliminated: Hiram Casas
| 190 | 4 | "Match a Master" | September 21, 2022 |
Skill of the Week: Adaptability; Elimination Tattoo: There was no flash challenge for the week. The artists had to tattoo against four Ink Masters: DJ Tambe (season 9 & 10), Anthony Michaels (season 7 & 10), Steve Tefft (season 2 & 10), and Tony Medellin (season 11). The Ink Masters pick a style for the artists to tattoo and go head to head with them.; Bottom: Angel Rose, Holli Marie, and Pon DeMan; Face-Off Tattoo: Angel, Holli, and Pon must freehand a tattoo to avoid elimination.; The four Ink Masters were offered to enter the competition and try to win the title again. The episode was left on a cliffhanger, so the results of the Face-Off was not revealed.
| 191 | 5 | "Master Mash Ups" | September 28, 2022 |
The results for the Face-Off tattoo was revealed in this episode. The four returning Ink Masters were also asked if they wanted to join the competition, and all agreed.: Eliminated: Holli Marie; Skill of the Week: Artistry; Flash Challenge: The remaining artists work in teams to create a massive work of art using cups. Each team has approximately 30,000 cups and must fill and arrange them using food coloring and water to create different blends and shades. They have previously done this challenge back in Season 10. Pon and Angel have the power to pick the teams.; Winner: Team Pon (Pon DeMan, Steve Tefft, DJ Tambe, and Anthony Michaels); Elimination Tattoo: The artists tattoo New School Landmark tattoos, but they must mashup a seemingly new school with black and grey realism. Katie started not feeling good after finishing her tattoo and had to leave before the critique. Things get interesting as three Ink Masters end up in the bottom.; Best Tattoo of the Day: Angel Rose; Bottom: Anthony Michaels, Steve Tefft, and Tony Medellin; Eliminated: Steve Tefft
| 192 | 6 | "Up in Flames" | October 5, 2022 |
Skill of the Week: Contrast; Flash Challenge: Katie still wasn’t feeling well and did not participate during the challenge. The artists had to create a high contrast piece of art using gunpowder. Working in teams of two, the artists must spread the highly explosive powder across two five-by-ten foot canvases. When finished, the powder will be lit up and be burned into the canvases.; Winners: Pon DeMan and Gian Karle; Elimination Tattoo: The artists must tattoo Ryan's specialty: black and grey. They must create a bug tattoo that looks like it could crawl out of the canvas's skin. Dave's twist for this challenge is for the artists to tattoo on the throat.; Best Tattoo of the Day: Gian Karle; Bottom: Pon DeMan & Katie McGowan; Eliminated: Pon DeMan
| 193 | 7 | "Panes of Pressure" | October 12, 2022 |
Skill of the Week: Composition; Flash Challenge: Working in two teams of four, the artists use ten four-by-five foot sheets of acrylic to create layers that make a dynamic piece of art. This challenge was done in Season 10.; Winners: Angel Rose, Gian Karle, Bob Jones, and Tony Medellin; Elimination Tattoo: The artists tackle Ami James' specialty: Japanese.; Guest Judge: Ruby Rose; Best Tattoo of the Day: DJ Tambe; Bottom: Katie McGowan, Creepy Jason, and Tony Medellin; Eliminated: Katie McGowan
| 194 | 8 | "Let the Sparks Fly" | October 19, 2022 |
Skill of the Week: Precision; Flash Challenge: The artists must use steel to create sculptures. Working in teams, the artists must bend, weld, etc. the pieces of metal to create a piece of art. This is the last Flash Challenge of the season. DJ assigns the teams.; Winners: Team DJ (DJ Tambe, Tony Medellin, Bob Jones, and Anthony Michaels); Elimination Tattoo: The artists tattoo Nikko's specialty: color realism by tattooing color portraits. For the first time this season, there will be a Jury of Peers, and all the artists have to make a decision together on who will be in the bottom. The tables turn on Gian as the Masters take shots at him, landing him in the bottom.; Best Tattoo of the Day: DJ Tambe; Bottom: Creepy Jason, Gian Karle, and Tony Medellin; Eliminated: Tony Medellin
| 195 | 9 | "Finale Part 1" | October 26, 2022 |
The remaining six artists must secure a spot in the Top 4. They must go through two grueling challenges.: 12 Hour Tattoo: The artists must do a 12-hour session on the leg. The tattoos are judged blind and they will rank the best ones. The top ranked artist will secure the first spot in the final four. The artist who is ranked the lowest will be eliminated. While the subject of the tattoo is up to the artists, the style is not. The artists pick a skull that will determine what style they must do. Bob earns the first spot in the final four. In an emotional elimination, Anthony's tattoo was ranked the lowest and was eliminated, but was praised by the judges and competitors for his character and artistry.; Best Tattoo of the Day: Bob Jones; Bottom: Creepy Jason & Anthony Michaels; Eliminated: Anthony Michaels; Tattoo Marathon: The artists must do four one hour tattoos. They all must design a tattoo for the marathon and have to tattoo theirs as well as each other's. Again, their work will be judged blind. Creepy Jason won the Tattoo Marathon and earned the second spot in the finale, while Gian secured the third. The episode was left on a cliffhanger, so the third highest ranked tattoo was not revealed.; Winner: Creepy Jason; Advanced: Gian Karle; Bottom: Angel Rose & DJ Tambe
| 196 | 10 | "Finale Part 2" | November 2, 2022 |
The result for the final spot in the Top 4 is revealed. DJ was the third highest ranked artist in the Tattoo Marathon and secured the final spot.: Advanced: DJ Tambe; Eliminated: Angel Rose; In order to win the season, the Top Four must do a 24-hour back-piece Master Canvas. Split into two 12 hour sessions back-to-back, the artists are able to do what they want. Once the judges finish critiquing their work, a jury of peers will return to vote one of the artists into the Top Three. Unlike previous seasons, the finale is not live in front of an audience. Angel Rose and Anthony Michaels return to form the jury of peers. Their top two choices were Bob and DJ, but they ultimately chose DJ to be in the Top Three due to the creativity of his piece. The judges then decided to eliminate Creepy Jason due to not having a main focal point in his tattoo. Bob is then eliminated because of readability issues. The judges have a heavy debate between DJ and Gian's tattoos. The jury of peers, which now includes Bob and Creepy Jason, have to vote as well, due to being a tie. DJ is declared the winner of the season, making this his third win.: Jury of Peers' Pick: DJ Tambe; Fourth Place: Creepy Jason; Third Place: Bob Jones; Runner-Up: Gian Karle; Winner: DJ Tambe

== No More Ink ==
No More Ink is a web series that serves as an after show and is posted on the show's official YouTube channel. After a contestant is eliminated from the competition, they are interviewed by Ryan Ashley, as they talk about their experience on the show and get more insight on the artists' life. Each episode is generally posted a day after a new episode of the main series premieres.

- Episode 1: Chris Shockley (aired September 8, 2022)
- Episode 2: Deanna Smith (aired September 8, 2022)
- Episode 3: Hiram Casas (aired September 15, 2022)
- Episode 4: Holli Marie (aired September 29, 2022)
- Episode 5: Steve Tefft (aired September 29, 2022)
- Episode 6: Pon DeMan (aired October 6, 2022)
- Episode 7: Katie McGowan (aired October 13, 2022)
- Episode 8: Tony Medellin (aired October 20, 2022)
- Episode 9: Anthony Michaels (aired October 27, 2022)
- Episode 10: Angel Rose (aired November 3, 2022)
- Episode 11: Creepy Jason (aired November 3, 2022)
- Episode 12: Bob Jones (aired November 4, 2022)
- Episode 13: Gian Karle (aired November 4, 2022)
- Episode 14: DJ Tambe (aired November 4, 2022)
