= Daniel Silva (tattoo artist) =

American tattoo artist

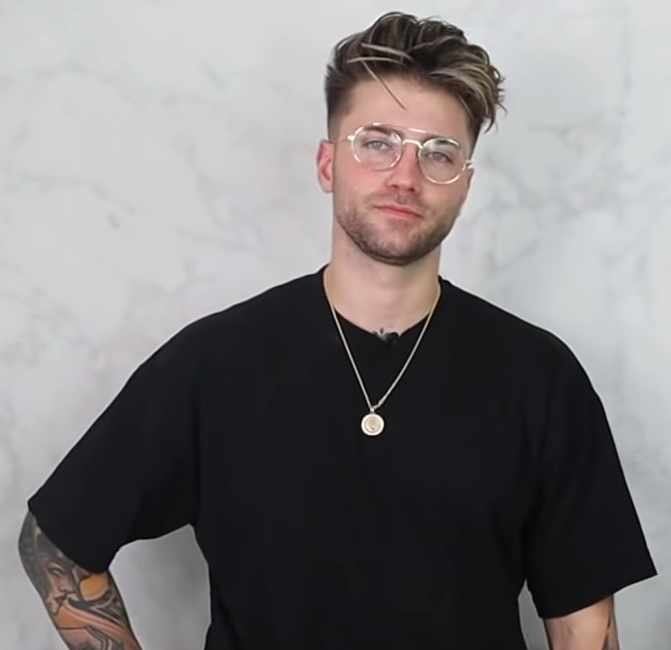
- Born: July 13, 1993 (age 32)
- Occupation: Tattoo artist
- Years active: 2015–2020; 2022–
- Known for: Ink Master contestant
- Television: Ink Master; Ink Master: Angels

YouTube information
- Channel: Daniel Silva
- Years active: 2016–2025
- Subscribers: 1.19 million
- Views: 474 million
- Last updated: January 29, 2025
- Website: www.tattoouniversity.com

Daniel Joseph Silva (born July 13, 1993) is an American celebrity tattoo artist and reality TV show star from Gilroy, California.

Silva was the driver in a traffic collision on May 10, 2020, killing passenger and YouTube star Corey La Barrie while out celebrating La Barrie's 25th birthday. Both Silva and La Barrie were intoxicated but Silva insisted on driving. Silva lost control of the car, crashing it. La Barrie was pronounced dead at a nearby hospital while Silva was arrested by the LAPD. He was sentenced to one year in prison, followed by five years of formal probation and 50 hours of community service.

== Career ==
Silva has tattooed Ethan Dolan, Brennen Taylor, Jalen Ramsey of the NFL, Trippie Redd, and TJ Dillashaw.

Silva participated in the tenth season of Ink Master and placed seventh. He previously appeared on the spinoff series, Ink Master Angels, earning himself a spot in the competition. In March 2019, after Romeo Lacoste ended his tattoo YouTube channel due to allegations of sending inappropriate messages to underage fans, Silva gained prominence as a replacement tattoo artist.

== Crash and arrest ==
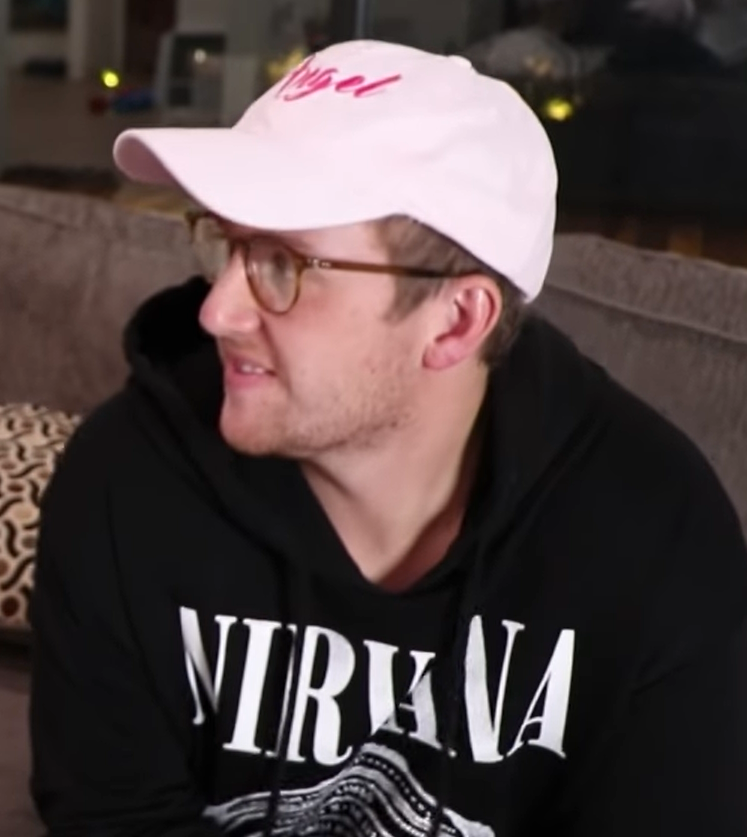
Corey La Barrie was killed after Silva crashed his McLaren 600LT.

On Sunday, May 10, 2020, around 9:39 p.m., YouTuber Corey La Barrie was killed when Silva crashed his 2020 McLaren 600LT after losing control of the vehicle; he ran off the road, and hit a tree, and then a street sign in North Hollywood. Silva attempted to flee the scene, but was stopped by witnesses of the crash. Both La Barrie and Silva were transported to a local hospital, where La Barrie succumbed to his injuries and was pronounced dead. La Barrie and Silva had reportedly been at a party earlier that night to celebrate La Barrie's 25th birthday, with sources saying that they had been drinking at the party.

Silva was arrested and booked for murder by the Los Angeles Police Department on Monday, and was held at the LAPD Valley Jail in Van Nuys on $2 million bail. Silva was charged for murder and pleaded not guilty to the charges.

La Barrie's parents, Simon La Barrie and Lissa Burton, filed a wrongful death claim against Silva.

In July 2020, he pleaded no contest in the death of La Barrie. On August 25, 2020, he was sentenced to one year in prison with five years of formal probation and 50 hours of community service.

In October 8, 2020, Silva was released from custody after serving his sentence. In January 2021, Silva's insurance company claimed La Barrie caused his own death, although Silva claimed he did not have time to review the complaint. The following month, Silva posted a YouTube video, in which he apologized "for all the pain that everybody's going through". He claimed La Barrie's family had requested for his charges to be reduced from second-degree murder to manslaughter. He also responded to assertions he ran away from the scene of the accident by stating he had no memory of what happened.
