= Ink Master: Angels =

- Genre: Reality television
- Starring: Ryan Ashley; Kelly Doty; Gia Rose; Nikki Simpson
- Narrated by: Rick Wasserman
- Theme music composer: Vanacore Music, Inc (season 1)
- Opening theme: "Devil or Angel" by The Clovers (season 2)
- Country of origin: United States
- Original language: English
- No. of seasons: 2
- No. of episodes: 21

Production
- Executive producers: Glenda Hersh; Steven Weinstock; Andrea Richter
- Producers: Matt Shelly; Burk Heffner; John Brimhall; Jamie Almeleh
- Cinematography: Brett Knott
- Editors: Mark Hervey; Sean Gill; Tony Nigro; Andrea Yaconi; Chad Coates; David S. Tung; Kevin Moore; Tyler Fausnaught
- Running time: 39–41 minutes
- Production company: Truly Original

Original release
- Network: Spike (season 1); Paramount Network (season 2)
- Release: October 3, 2017 – May 29, 2018

Related
- Ink Master; Ink Master: Redemption

Ink Master: Angels is a spin-off of the tattoo reality competition Ink Master that premiered on October 3, 2017 on the Paramount Network. The series follows season 8 competitors Ryan Ashley, who won that season, Kelly Doty, Gia Rose, and Nikki Simpson as they travel around the nation going head-to-head with some of the country's top local artists who are competing to earn a spot on a future season of Ink Master.

== Overview ==
Three local artists compete with one being eliminated in each round. The first round served as a two-hour elimination tattoo where the artists must tattoo a body part in the style and subject of their choice in order to impress the Angels. For round two, two artists had four hours to tattoo a subject the city's known for. Originally, Season 1 featured the local artist picked the Angel they want to face on the day of the face off. But starting with Season 2, it is revealed that the winner of the second round will face a random Angel. The Angel and the local artist will then draw white skulls that will determine who gets one of the two human canvases before the six hour process begins where they have to tattoo a subject inspired by a certain theme in the human canvas and or city. The Angels, the eliminated local artists, and the audience each get one vote following the conclusion of the tattooing. And if the local artist gets the most votes and successfully takes down an Angel, they will earn a spot on Ink Master.

== Production ==
On June 5, 2017, Spike ordered a second Ink Master spin-off focusing on Season 8's female competitors which includes winner Ryan Ashley, and finalists Kelly Doty, Nikki Simpson and Gia Rose. A 10-episode second season was commissioned on November 17, 2017 that aired on March 27, 2018 on Spike's rebranded channel Paramount Network. However, Rose did not return for the second season, leaving just the trio of Ashley, Doty, and Simpson.

== Cast ==
=== Judges ===
- Ryan Ashley
- Kelly Doty
- Gia Rose (season 1)
- Nikki Simpson

=== Special appearances ===
Former Ink Master competitors who appeared in episodes.

Season 1

Episode 1

- DJ Tambe, co-winner of Ink Master (with Bubba Irwin) season 9, and, coach (of contestant Josh Payne) and master challenge winner of season 10
- Joey Hamilton, winner of season 3
- Cleen Rock One, runner-up on season 5 and season 7, and contestant on season 9
- Noelin Wheeler, contestant on season 9
- Big Ceeze, contestant on season 6

Episode 3

- Tatu Baby, contestant on Ink Master season 2 and season 3

Episode 8

- Sarah Miller, runner-up on Ink Master season 2 and contestant on season 7

Season 2

Episode 2

- Sarah Miller, runner-up on Ink Master season 2 and contestant on season 7

Episode 4

- Katie McGowan, contestant on Ink Master season 6 and runner-up on season 9
- Matt O'Baugh, contestant on season 6 and runner-up on season 9

Episode 5

- Frank Ready, contestant on Ink Master season 10

Episode 6

- Daniel Silva, contestant on Ink Master season 10

Episode 8

- Duffy Fortner, contestant on Ink Master season 6

Episode 9

- Bubba Irwin, contestant on Ink Master season 4 and co-winner of season 9 (with DJ Tambe)
- Tatu Baby, contestant on season 2 and season 3

Episode 10

- Megan Jean Morris, contestant on Ink Master season 7

== Episodes ==
=== Series overview ===
Season	Episodes	Originally released	
Season	Episodes	First released	Last released
1	11	October 3, 2017	December 12, 2017
2	10	March 27, 2018	May 29, 2018

=== Season 1 (2017) ===
The contestants competed to earn a spot on Ink Master: Return of the Masters.

No. overall	No. in season	Title	Original release date	US viewers (millions)
1	1	"Viva Las Angels"	October 2, 2017	0.45
The premiere opened with a dedication to the victims of the Las Vegas shooting that occurred two days prior to the airing.: 2 Hr Elimination Tattoo: The first elimination tattoo took place at Tone Chingon's shop Americana Tattoo Co. Tone, Carrie and Infamous Jones must tattoo any style, any subject in the placement of their choice. Ink Master Season 9 co-winner DJ Tambe made an appearance at Carrie's shop.; Winner: Tone Chingon; Eliminated: Infamous Jones; 4 Hour Elimination Tattoo: The next elimination round took place at Revolt Tattoos that's run by Ink Master Season 3 winner Joey Hamilton who co-owns the shop with former contestant Sausage. Tone and Carrie tattooed a face in Chicano-Style Traditional which was the style chosen by the Tone as the winner of round 1.; Winner: Tone Chingon; Eliminated: Carrie Cameron; Angel Face Off Tattoo: Tone chose Ryan Ashley to face off against. They had six hours to tattoo a design that represented the human canvas overcoming their battle with addiction. In addition to Joey Hamilton, former Ink Master contestants Noelin Wheeler and Cleen Rock One were also in attendance to watch the face off.; Winner: Ryan Ashley
2	2	"Bigger'n Dallas"	October 9, 2017	0.38
2 Hour Elimination Tattoo: This elimination challenge took place at Artistic Encounters where Dominique works. She along with Deanna and Ejay had to tattoo any style, any subject matter but placement had to be on the foot.; Winner: Deanna Smith; Eliminated: Dominique Ransom; 4 Hour Elimination Tattoo: The Angels specified the style as American Traditional. As the winner of Round 1, Deanna chose Geishas as the subject. This elimination challenge took place at Sparrows Tattoo Company where the Angels meet the family of late Ink Master Season 2 contestant Clint Cummings who died from colorectal cancer.; Winner: Deanna Smith; Eliminated: Ejay Bernal; Angel Face Off Tattoo: In honor of Clint Cummings and his battle against colorectal cancer, Deanna and Gia had six hours to tattoo a design for canvases that had been affected in some way by the same cancer. Clint's family was in attendance to watch the face off.; Winner: Deanna Smith
3	3	"Moons Over Miami"	October 16, 2017	0.39
2 Hour Elimination Tattoo: This elimination tattoo took place at Miami Tattoo Co. that's owned by a friend of former Ink Master finalist Tatu Baby. High Noon gets an interesting reunion with his former apprentice Jose Rosado. The third artist to join them is Mel Vespertine. The artists bring the pain in the butt in their butt tattoos, any style, any subject.; Winner: Jose Rosado; Eliminated: High Noon; 4 Hour Elimination Tattoo: Jose and Mel must design a popular subject in Miami which is religious tattoo in the style of Kelly's choice which is new school. As the winner of Round 1, Jose got to choose his canvas.; Winner: Jose Rosado; Eliminated: Mel Vespertine; Angel Face Off Tattoo: Jose chose Kelly Doty to face off against. The human canvases told their stories about immigrating to America from their respective countries. Kelly and Jose must create a tattoo that reflects their journey.; Winner: Kelly Doty
4	4	"Smells Like Seattle Spirit"	October 23, 2017	0.45
This was the last episode Gia Rose filmed before departing the show.: 2 Hour Elimination Tattoo: This elimination tattoo took place at Paradox Tattoo Gallery owned by Whitney. her, Graydon and Nicholas had to tattoo any subject, any style on the elbow. Gia had a medical emergency and did not participate in judging.; Winner: Graydon Payne; Eliminated: Nicholas Guevara; 4 Hour Elimination Tattoo: The subject assigned by the Angels was landscapes. The winner, Graydon, chose illustrative colour as the style but the placement was the canvas' choice.; Winner: Graydon Payne; Eliminated: Whitney Havoc; Angel Face Off Tattoo: The human canvases tell their story about being homeless. Nikki and Graydon must create a tattoo that reflects their journey. Gia returns to judge the Face Off.; Winner: Nikki Simpson
5	5	"Angels in Hotlanta"	October 30, 2017	0.33
2 Hour Eliminatiom Tattoo: Roger, Grip and Tim tough it out in creating armpit tattoos. This elimination round took place at Rodger's shop Black Owl.; Winner: Tim Furlow; Eliminated: Daquan "Grip" Marsh; 4 Hour Elimination Tattoo: Roger and Tim bring a little Southern flair by tattooing Southern Belle Pin-ups. This elimination round took place at Ink & Dagger Tattoo. One of the artists at the shop, Eddie Stacey, reunites with Kelly.; Winner: Tim Furlow; Eliminated: Roger Parrilla; Angel Face Off Tattoo: Gia and Tim tattooed a design inspired by their canvases' work as community activists.; Winner: Tim Furlow
6	6	"Golden Gate Angels"	November 6, 2017	0.34
2 Hour Elimination Tattoo: This elimination tattoo took place at Tattoo City in San Francisco where the angels met one of the founders of American tattooing, Don 'Ed' Hardy. Doug Hardy (Ed Hardy's son), Fonk and Daniel had to tattoo any subject, any style but placement had to be on the neck. Angel Gia Rose was absent.; Winner: Daniel Silva; Eliminated: Fonk; 4 Hour Elimination Tattoo: The subject assigned by the Angels was jeweled tattoos. Daniel got to choose his canvas. The placement had to be wherever the canvas chose. One canvas wanted it on her ankle and the other wanted it on her sternum. Daniel chose the ankle.; Winner: Daniel Silva; Eliminated: Doug Hardy; Angel Face Off Tattoo: Daniel chose to face off against Ryan Ashley. The human canvases tell their stories of having suffered hardships due to their sexual identifies.; Winner: Daniel Silva
7	7	"Music City Ink"	November 13, 2017	0.41
2 Hour Elimination Tattoo: This elimination tattoo took place at Nashville Ink Tattoo. Rose, Cavan Infante and Tai Orten had to tattoo any subject, any style incorporating the belly button.; Winner: Rose; Eliminated: Cavan Infante; 4 Hour Elimination Tattoo: The subject assigned by the Angels was gypsy heads. The winner, Rose, chose neo-traditional as the style.; Winner: Tai Orten; Eliminated: Rose; Angel Face Off Tattoo: Tai chose to face off against Kelly Doty. The human canvases tell their story of surviving natural disasters.; Angels choice: Kelly Doty Local artists choice: Kelly Doty Guests choice: Tai Orten: Winner: Kelly Doty
8	8	"Steel City Showdown"	November 20, 2017	0.32
2 Hour Elimination Tattoo: This elimination tattoo took place at Pyramid Tattoo in Pittsburgh. Rachel Helmich, Nick DeMars and Joe Capone (Rachel's brother) had to tattoo any subject, any style but placement had to be on the kneecap.; Winner: Rachel Helmich; Eliminated: Nick DeMars; 4 Hour Elimination Tattoo: The subject assigned by the Angels was geometric tattoos. The winner, Rachel, got to choose her canvas. Both canvases had experienced significant weight loss. The location was Wyld Chyld Tattoo which is owned by Ink Master Season 2 Runner Up, Sarah Miller.; Winner: Rachel Helmich; Eliminated: Joe Capone; Angel Face Off Tattoo: Rachel chose to face off against Nikki Simpson. The human canvases tell their story of how their lives were affected by Parkinson's disease.; Winner: Rachel Helmich
9	9	"Keep Austin Inked"	November 27, 2018	0.43
2 Hour Elimination Tattoo: This elimination tattoo took place at [??? Tattoo & Body Piercing]. Kat Herrera, Sparks and John Dame had to tattoo any subject, any style but it had to be on the head.; Winner: John Dame; Eliminated: Kat Herrera; 4 Hour Elimination Tattoo: The subject assigned by the Angels was bats. John chose new-school as the style. This elimination tattoo took place at the Concrete Cowboy.; Winner: Sparks; Eliminated: John Dame; Angel Face Off Tattoo: Texas is home to hundreds of military bases. So Kelly and Sparks tattooed veterans that have served in the military.; Winner: Sparks
10	10	"Angels in the Big Easy"	December 4, 2017	0.38
2 Hour Elimination Tattoo: Tattoo Tracy, Tai Viper, Mecca must create a tattoo in the knee ditch. This elimination tattoo took place at Tattoo Tracey's shop Wicked 13 Tattoo Shop.; Winner: Mecca; Eliminated: Tattoo Tracy; 4 Hour Elimination Tattoo: The remaining artists try to bring the spirit of New Orleans in their Mardi Gras masks in the style of their choice.; Eliminated: Mecca; Angel Face Off Tattoo: Nikki and Tai Viper designed tattoos that are inspired by the canvases work in foster care.; Winner: Nikki Simpson
11	11	"Angels of the Inner Harbor"	December 11, 2017	0.46
This was the first episode of the series filmed. Different format for this episode. Instead of a 2-hour and a 4-hour elimination tattoo, the competitors had to do one 5-hour tattoo.: 5 Hour Elimination Tattoo: The Angels went to Baltimore and stopped at Tony's shop Deville Ink, and asked him to host the next competition as well as compete in it. Kelly and Nikki went to invite Tony who worked at the shop for a very short time while Ryan and Gia went to invite Ria and apparently Tony Scientific who was Ria's mentor at one time. Tony S, Tony D and Ria tattooed any style and any subject.; Winner: Tony Scientific; Eliminated: Tony Deville and Ria Rabbit; Angel Face Off Tattoo: Ryan and Tony S designed tattoos that were inspired by how the canvases were affected by gun violence.; Winner: Ryan Ashley

=== Season 2 (2018) ===
The contestants competed to earn a spot on Ink Master: Grudge Match – Cleen vs. Christian. Gia Rose did not return for the second season.

No. overall	No. in season	Title	Original release date	US viewers (millions)
12	1	"Showdown in Charlotte"	March 27, 2018	0.33
2 Hour Elimination Tattoo: After a mini reunion with each other, Terry, Jon and Teej each designed an Eastern Box turtle, which is the state turtle of North Carolina, in the style of their choice. This elimination tattoo took place at Terry's shop Sink or Swim Tattoo.; Winner: Teej Poole; Eliminated: Terry Darkman; 4 Hr Elimination Tattoo: This elimination tattoo took place at 510 Expert Tattoo. Teej and Jon tattooed a crown in honor of Charlotte's nickname "The Queen City" after the British Queen Charlotte. Teej picked realism black and grey as the style of tattoo, with the winner moving on to face Kelly in the face off.; Winner: Teej Poole; Eliminated: Jon Ronzka; Angel Face Off Tattoo: During an emotional face off, Kelly and Teej tattooed domestic violence survivors which brought Kelly to tears after admitting to her canvas Theodosia that she was once in an abusive relationship.; Winner: Teej Poole; The episode concludes with a message from the Joyful Heart Foundation.
13	2	"Georgia Peach"	April 3, 2018	0.38
2 Hour Elimination Tattoo: Clay, Brittany and Jimmy must design Georgia's well known fruit in the style of their choice, a peach. This elimination tattoo took place at Clay's shop Anonymous Tattoo.; Winner: Clay McCay; Eliminated: Brittany Lively; 4 Hour Elimination Tattoo: The first American steamship to make it across the Atlantic left from Savannah, Georgia in 1819. In honour of that, Ryan and Nikki tasked Clay and Jimmy to tattoo a ship in the style chosen by the winner of the last round. Clay chose American Traditional. This elimination tattoo took place at Red Ocean Tattoo.; Winner: Jimmy Butcher; Eliminated: Clay McCay; Angel Face Off Tattoo: Ryan and Jimmy tattooed human canvases who lost their loved ones due to violent crimes.; Guest Judge: Sarah Miller; Winner: Ryan Ashley
14	3	"Even Angels Get the Blues"	April 10, 2018	0.31
2 Hour Elimination Tattoo: This elimination tattoo was held at Chad's shop Hybrid Moments Tattoo. He along with his fiance Bri, and Nickole tattooed a vintage microphone.; Winner: Nickole Ashlock; Eliminated: Bri Walker: 4 Hour Elimination Tattoo: Held at the Tattoo Shot, Chad and Nickole must incorporate Memphis' love for the blues by designing a blue monochromatic tattoo with the former choosing a woman's face as the subject.; Winner: Nickole Ashlock; Elimination: Chad Newsome; Angel Face Off Tattoo: Nikki and Nickole tattoo human canvases who lost their newborn child due to infant mortality.: Winner: Nikki Simpson
15	4	"Little Rock, Big Egos"	April 17, 2018	0.40
2 Hour Elimination Tattoo: This elimination tattoo took place at Black Cobra Tattoos, co-owned by former Ink Master competitors Katie McGowan and Matt O'Baugh. Blake, Chris and Nick had to tattoo the state gem of Arkansas which is the diamond in the style of their choice.; Winner: Blake Cranford; Eliminated: Chris Thomas; 4 Hour Elimination Tattoo: Blake and Nick had to tattoo a Boggy Creek monster. As the winner of the first round, Blake chose the one element that must be incorporated into both tattoos and he chose baby arms. This elimination tattoo took place at 7th Street Tattoo & Salon.; Winner: Blake Cranford; Eliminated: Nick Peirce; Angel Face Off Tattoo: Blake and Kelly tattooed human canvases who were either victims of racism or activists fighting racial injustice.; Winner: Kelly Doty
16	5	"Healed by an Angel"	April 24, 2018	0.35
2 Hour Elimination Tattoo: This elimination tattoo took place at Black Magic Tattoo in Oklahoma City. The Angels were greeted by one of the artists who works at the shop which was former Ink Master contestant Frank Ready. Muse, Drew and Derek had to tattoo tornadoes in the style of their choice.; Winner: Drew Shurtleff; Eliminated: Muse; 4 Hour Elimination Tattoo: Drew and Derek had to tattoo Native American headdresses. As the winner of the first round, Drew chose photo realism as the style. This elimination tattoo took place at Museart Tattoo Co.; Winner: Drew Shurtleff; Eliminated: Derek Sharp; Angel Face Off Tattoo: Drew and Nikki tattooed human canvases who were directly affected by domestic terrorism and the truck bombing of the Alfred P Murrah Federal Building on April 19, 1995. Chris Fields was the firefighter in the Pulitzer Prize for Breaking News Photography winning photo of him holding Erin Almon's daughter Baylee who just turned one a day prior to the tragedy. Almon recalls her story to Drew about the daycare center Baylee was at when the bombing occurred.; Winner: Nikki Simpson
17	6	"Mess with an Angel, Get the Horns"	May 1, 2018	0.34
2 Hour Elimination Tattoo: Blake, Mel and Mike had to tattoo Texas longhorns in any style. This elimination tattoo took place at Demon Ink Tattoo Studio in Houston, Texas. The Angels had a hard time with who had the best tattoo. And because of this, no winner was announced.; Eliminated: Mel Cox; 4 Hour Elimination Tattoo: When Apollo 11 first landed on the moon, Neil Armstrong's first words were, "Houston, Tranquility Base here. The Eagle has landed." In honour of that, Blake and Mike had to tattoo outer space. Because there was no winner in the first round, Ryan chose aliens as her favourite subject matter. This elimination tattoo took place at Artistic Impressions Tattoo Studio.; Winner: Mike Wallace; Eliminated: Blake Thomas; Angel Face Off Tattoo: Ryan and Mike tattooed human canvases who had been personally affected by Hurricane Harvey. Blake refused to participate in judging the face off. Judging in his place was Daniel Silva who earned a spot on season 10 of Ink Master by winning his Face-Off against an Angel in the previous season.; Guest judge: Daniel Silva; Winner: Ryan Ashley
18	7	"The Biggest Little City in the World"	May 8, 2018	0.31
2 Hour Elimination Tattoo: This elimination tattoo took place at Marked Studios in Reno. There are several nuclear testing facilities throughout the Nevada desert, so Judicael Vales, Siva Stradling Vea and Tony Medellin had to tattoo mutant DNA strands in the style of their choice.; Winner: Judicael Vales; Eliminated: Siva Stradling Vea; 4 Hour Elimination Tattoo: Nevada has more ghost towns than actual populated towns, so Judicael and Tony had to tattoo grim reapers. As the winner of the first round, Judicael chose the style to tattoo and he chose dot work. This elimination tattoo took place at Black Widow Ink.; Winner: Tony Medellin; Eliminated: Judicael Vales; Angel Face Off Tattoo: Tony and Nikki Simpson tattooed human canvases who had lost a loved one due to suicide.; Winner: Tony Medellin
19	8	"Atomic Angels"	May 15, 2018	0.34
2 Hour Elimination Tattoo: This elimination tattoo took place at Archetype Tattoo Studio in Albuquerque. Jessie, Don and Chris tattoo a mushroom cloud inspired by the first atomic bomb that was dropped in New Mexico in 1945 as a test run.; Guest Angel: Duffy Fortner; Winner: Don Hawkins; Eliminated: Chris Partain; 4 Hour Elimination Tattoo: There is much Hispanic culture in the city and an important part of Hispanic culture in countries all over the world is celebrating Dia de los Muertos / Day of the Dead, so Don and Jessie had to do Day of the Dead tattoos. As the winner of the first round, Don chose the style to tattoo and he chose black-and-gray realism. This elimination tattoo took place at Ascension Body Modification. Unlike the previous episodes, the winner of this round will go on to face off against Ink Master season 6 contestant Duffy Fortner.; Winner: Don Hawkins; Eliminated: Jessie Campolo; Angel Face Off Tattoo: Don Hawkins and Duffy tattooed human canvases who had been directly affected by New Mexico's drug epidemic.; Winner: Duffy Fortner
20	9	"Can’t Nail a Cactus"	May 22, 2018	0.41
2 Hour Elimination Tattoo: Things gets heated when the Angels arrived in Phoenix. This elimination was held at Amelia's shop Club Tattoo. Amelia, Tony and Don Don designed cactus tattoos.; Eliminated: Tony Olvera; Winner: Don Don Henandez; 4 Hour Elimination Tattoo: This elimination tattoo took place at the winning shop of Ink Master season 9, Old Town Ink, owned by DJ Tambe and Bubba Irwin. The Angels were greeted by co-winner Bubba Irwin. Amelia and Don Don tattooed a rattlesnake with latter choosing the thigh over the butt as his placement.; Guest Judge: Tatu Baby; Winner: Amelia Rose Whitney; Eliminated: Don Don Hernandez; Angel Face Off Tattoo: Kelly and Ameila tattooed human canvases who were affect by the death of their loved ones due to drunk driving.; Winner: Kelly Doty
21	10	"Every Rose Has Its Thorn"	May 29, 2018	0.39
2 Hour Elimination Tattoo: This elimination tattoo took place at Hidden Rose Tattoo in Portland. Emily, Risa and Austin created plaid tattoos in the style of their choice.; Winner: Austin Rose; Eliminated: Risa Stevens; 4 Hour Elimination Tattoo: Austin and Emily had to tattoo burlesque pinups. As the winner of the first round, Austin chose the one element that must be incorporated into both tattoos and he chose beadwork. This elimination tattoo took place at Freaks and Geeks Tattoo Studio.; Guest Judge: Megan Jean Morris; Winner: Austin Rose; Eliminated: Emily Kaul; Angel Face Off Tattoo: Austin and Ryan Ashley tattooed human canvases who had a loved one with autism. The face off was brutal as Ryan was unable to finish her tattoo while Austin's canvas tapped out before time was up.; Guest Judge: Megan Jean Morris; Winner: Austin Rose
