= Ink Master season 12 =

Ink Master: Battle of the Sexes
- Season 12
- Hosted by: Dave Navarro
- Judges: Chris Núñez; Oliver Peck
- No. of contestants: 18
- Winner: Laura Marie
- No. of episodes: 16

Release
- Original network: Paramount Network
- Original release: June 11 – September 24, 2019

Season chronology
- ← Previous; Grudge Match — Cleen vs. Christian Next → Turf War

Ink Master: Battle of the Sexes is the twelfth season of the tattoo reality competition Ink Master that premiered on Paramount Network on June 11, 2019, with a total of 16 episodes. The show is hosted and judged by Jane's Addiction guitarist Dave Navarro, with accomplished tattoo artists Chris Núñez and Oliver Peck serving as series regular judges. The winner received $100,000, a feature in Inked magazine and the title of Ink Master.

The premise of this season was having two teams of 9 artists, split based on their gender, competing as teams until the finale. This season also featured Ink Master winners and veterans coaching the teams in individual episodes, with the males coaching the women's team and the females coaching the men's team. And depending on which gender was eliminated, one coach advanced to the live finale where they competed in the Clash of the Coaches Face-Off for $25,000. This was the last season to have a live finale.

The winner of the twelfth season of Ink Master was Laura Marie, with Dani Ryan being the runner-up. The winner of the Clash of the Coaches Face-Off was Ryan Ashley, with DJ Tambe being the runner-up.

== Judging and ranking ==
=== Judging Panel ===
The judging panel is a table of three or more primary judges in addition to the coaches. The judges make their final decision by voting to see who had best tattoo of the day, and who goes home.

=== Jury of Peers ===
In Season 12, the artist who wins best tattoo of the day gives their respective team the power to put up one artist for elimination.

== Contestants ==
Names, experience, and cities stated are at time of filming.

Contestant Name	Years of experience	Hometown	Outcome
Laura Marie (Laura Marie Wachholder)	6	Geneseo, New York	Winner
Dani Ryan	2^{1/2}	Warren, Rhode Island	Runner-up
Creepy Jason (Jason Lynn)	13	Hampstead, Maryland	3rd place
Jake Ross	9	Cleveland, Ohio	4th place
Pon (Antonio DeCaro)	19	Queens, New York	5th place
Cam Pohl (Cameron Pohl)	6	Lansing, Michigan	6th place
Holli Marie	5	Deep River, Connecticut	7th place
Janelle Hanson	4	Madison, Wisconsin	8th place
Alexis Kovacs	18	Bethlehem, Pennsylvania	9th place
Ash Mann	6	Newburgh, New York	10th place
Fon (Taquan Carr)	5	Philadelphia, Pennsylvania	11th place
Tito Zambrano	12	Valdosta, Georgia	12th place
Ashley Anoneison (Ashley McNamara)	4	Salem, New Hampshire	13th place
Pony Wave	6	Los Angeles, California	14th place
Justin Nordine	10	Grand Junction, Colorado	15th place
Big Jaz	24	Brooklyn, New York	16th place
Elva Stefanie	7	Poughkeepsie, New York	17th place (Note: Stefanie quit the competition.)
Tim Lease	5	Orlando, Florida	18th place

== Clash of the Coaches Face-Off ==
Coach	Original Season	Original Placement	Outcome
Ryan Ashley	Season 8	Winner	Winner
DJ Tambe	Season 9	Winner	Runner-up
Nikki Simpson	Season 8	5th place	3rd place
Aaron "Bubba" Irwin	Season 4	11th/12th place	4th place
Aaron "Bubba" Irwin	Season 9	Winner	4th place
Duffy Fortner	Season 6	5th place	5th place
Jime Litwalk	Season 3	Runner-up	6th place
Jime Litwalk	Season 7	8th place	6th place
Megan Jean Morris	Season 7	9th place	7th place

=== Eliminated ===
Coach	Original Season	Original Placement
Joey Hamilton	Season 3	Winner
Sarah Miller	Season 2	Runner-up
Sarah Miller	Season 7	10th place
Katie McGowan	Season 6	8th place
Katie McGowan	Season 9	Runner-up
Walter "Sausage" Frank	Season 4	Runner-up
Walter "Sausage" Frank	Season 7	7th place
Kelly Doty	Season 8	3rd place
James Vaughn	Season 1	3rd place
James Vaughn	Season 7	4th place
Josh Payne	Season 10	Winner

== Contestant progress ==
Indicates the contestant was a part of the Men's team. Indicates the contestant was a part of the Women's team.

Contestant	Episode															
Contestant	1 (Note: Creepy Jason and Tito defeated Tim in the Face-Off challenge to determine who would stay in the competition.)	2	3	4	5 (Note: Alexis, Ash and Tito defeated Pony in the Face-Off challenge to determine who would stay in the competition.)	6	7 (Note: Ash, Creepy Jason, Dani, Janelle and Pon defeated Tito in the Face-Off challenge to determine who would stay in the competition.)	8	9	10	11	12 (Note: Cam, Dani, Jake, Laura and Pon defeated Holli in the Face-Off challenge to determine who would stay in the competition.)	13	14	15	16
Laura Marie	SAFE	SAFE	TOP2	SAFE	HIGH	SAFE	WIN	HIGH	WIN	SAFE	HIGH	BTM6	WIN	BTM3	ADV	Winner
Dani Ryan	SAFE	TOP2	HIGH	HIGH	SAFE	TOP2	BTM6	TOP2	TOP2	SAFE	SAFE	BTM6	BTM3	WIN	WIN	Runner-up
Creepy Jason	BTM3	SAFE	SAFE	WIN	HIGH	SAFE	BTM6	HIGH	BTM3	WIN	WIN	SAFE	BTM3	BTM3	ADV	Eliminated
Jake Ross	SAFE	SAFE	HIGH	SAFE	HIGH	BTM3	WIN	BTM3	SAFE	BTM3	HIGH	BTM6	HIGH	TOP2	ELIM	Guest
Pon	SAFE	SAFE	SAFE	HIGH	WIN	SAFE	BTM6	HIGH	SAFE	TOP2	HIGH	BTM6	SAFE	ELIM		Guest
Cam Pohl	SAFE	SAFE	SAFE	LOW	HIGH	WIN	WIN	BTM3	SAFE	HIGH	BTM3	BTM6	ELIM			Guest
Holli Marie	SAFE	SAFE	HIGH	SAFE	SAFE	HIGH	WIN	HIGH	HIGH	SAFE	BTM3	ELIM				Guest
Janelle Hanson	SAFE	SAFE	BTM3	LOW	SAFE	HIGH	BTM6	HIGH	HIGH	BTM3	ELIM					Guest
Alexis Kovacs	SAFE	BTM3	SAFE	SAFE	BTM4	SAFE	WIN	WIN	BTM3	ELIM						Guest
Ash Mann	SAFE	SAFE	BTM3	BTM3	BTM4	BTM3	BTM6	HIGH	ELIM							Guest
Fon	SAFE	WIN	WIN	SAFE	SAFE	SAFE	WIN	ELIM								Guest
Tito Zambrano	BTM3	SAFE	SAFE	HIGH	BTM4	SAFE	ELIM									Guest
Ashley Anoneison	SAFE	LOW	HIGH	BTM3	HIGH	ELIM										Guest
Pony Wave	SAFE	SAFE	HIGH	HIGH	ELIM											Guest
Justin Nordine	SAFE	SAFE	SAFE	ELIM												Guest
Big Jaz	SAFE	BTM3	ELIM													Guest
Elva Stefanie	SAFE	QUIT														Guest
Tim Lease	ELIM															Guest

The contestant won Ink Master.
The contestant was the runner-up.
The contestant was eliminated during the finale.
The contestant advanced to the finale.
The contestant was exempt from the first elimination.
The contestant won Best Tattoo of the Day.
The contestant won the Tattoo Marathon.
The contestant won their Head-to-Head challenge.
The contestant was among the top.
The contestant received positive critiques.
The contestant received negative critiques.
The contestant was in the bottom.
The contestant was put in the bottom by the Jury of Peers
The contestant was eliminated from the competition.
The contestant was put in the bottom by the Jury of Peers and was eliminated from the competition.
The contestant quit the competition.
The contestant returned as a guest for that episode.

== Episodes ==
No. overall	No. in season	Title	Original release date	US viewers (millions)
156	1	"The Ink Will Speak for Itself"	June 11, 2019	0.54
Nine men and nine women kick off an epic battle of the sexes by going head to head in a team collaboration tattoo to prove they have what it takes to be the next Ink Master: Winning Team: Women's Team; Face Off Tattoo: Creepy Jason, Tim Lease, Tito Zambrano; Eliminated: Tim Lease
157	2	"A Storm is Brewin'"	June 18, 2019	0.64
Team leaders emerge in a shocking new season-long twist that sends the Artists a wake-up call and shakes up the competition; The Battle of the Sexes continues for $100K and the title of Ink Master.: Skill of the Week: Shading; Flash Challenge: For their first flash challenge, Ryan Ashley, winner of season 8, and Joey Hamilton, winner of season 3, coached the men's and women's team to construct art made entirely of coffee beans.; Winner: Men's Team; Elimination Tattoo: In their first elimination tattoo as individuals, the artist are tasked with tattooing in their coach's (Ashley and Hamilton) specialty, black & grey. During the elimination, Elva admits to the judges that her bipolar disorder was too much to handle. And due to her withdrawal, Ryan earned the first spot to compete at the live finale for $25,000.; Best Tattoo of the Day: Fon; Bottom: Alexis Kovacs, Big Jaz, Elva Stefanie
158	3	"Down to the Wire"	June 25, 2019	0.57
Skill of the Week: Legibility; Flash Challenge: Bubba Irwin of season 4 and winner of season 9, and Sarah Miller of season 2 and season 7 return to help coach the men's and women's team to construct a 3D sculpture made entirely of different colored electrical wire.; Winner: Women's Team; Elimination Tattoo: The contestants created surrealistic tattoos. With Big Jaz's elimination, Bubba advances as the second coach for the Clash of the Coaches Face-Off in the live finale.; Best Tattoo of the Day: Fon; Bottom: Janelle Hanson, Big Jaz, Ash Mann; Eliminated: Big Jaz
159	4	"The Hunter & The Hunted"	July 2, 2019	0.53
Skill of the Week: Contrast; Flash Challenge: 2-time winner DJ Tambe from seasons 9 and 10 and Katie McGowan of seasons 6 and 9 help coach the men's and women's team for the episode. For this flash challenge, the teams must work with their respective coaches to create a masterpiece that hits contrast. They must paint an image on walls that are staggered so that when you view the image from a certain angle you see the completed picture.; Winner: Women's Team; Elimination Tattoo: The artists are challenged to tattoo neo-traditional animals. With Justin's elimination, DJ becomes the third coach to advance in the Coaches Face-Off in the live finale.; Best Tattoo of the Day: Creepy Jason; Bottom: Ashley Anoneison, Ash Mann, Justin Nordine; Eliminated: Justin Nordine
160	5	"The Art Stands Alone"	July 9, 2019	0.64
Skill of the Week: Artistic Ability; Elimination Tattoo: The artists create a tattoo to show their artistic ability.; Best Tattoo of the Day: Pon; Bottom: Pony Wave, Alexis Kovacs; Called Down into Face-Off: Ash Mann, Tito Zambrano; Eliminated: Pony Wave
161	6	"Art of War"	July 16, 2019	0.57
Skill of the Week: Consistency; Flash Challenge: Sausage from seasons 4 and 7 coaches the women's team while Duffy from season 6 coaches the men's team. For this flash challenge, the teams must work with their respective coaches to engrave suits of armor.; Winner: Men's Team; Elimination Tattoo: To show consistency, the artists are challenged with creating cross-stitch tattoos. With Ashley's elimination, Duffy advances into the Coaches Face-Off in the live finale.; Best Tattoo of the Day: Cam Pohl; Bottom: Ash Mann, Ashley Anoneison, Jake Ross; Eliminated: Ashley Anoneison
162	7	"Sabotage"	July 23, 2019	0.62
Skill of the Week: Technical Application; Elimination Tattoo: There were no teams this week and the artists faced off against one another. Each artist chose skulls which determined if they would get to choose their opponent or what they tattooed. There would be one winner of each face off. The loser would be up for elimination. All the artists that lost their face off tattooed Japanese traditional color hannya masks.; Bottom: Ash Mann, Tito Zambrano, Dani Ryan, Creepy Jason, Janelle Hanson, Pon; Eliminated: Tito Zambrano
163	8	"Pins & No Needles"	July 30, 2019	0.56
Skill of the Week: Color Theory; Flash Challenge: Jime from seasons 3 and 7 coaches the women's team while Kelly from season 8 coaches the men's team. The teams must create an image showing color theory by filling a field of ink caps with tattoo ink. They are only given the primary colors, black, and white. They must mix their other colors.; Winner: Women's Team; Elimination Tattoo: In order to show color theory, the artists are tasked with tattooing a style that both of their coaches specialize in: New School. The women successfully made a comeback thanks to their coach Jime Litwalk, and they even managed to give a couple men some of the toughest canvases including frontrunner Fon. Men's team coach Kelly Doty was unable to participate in the critique due to family emergency. With Fon's elimination, Jime advances into the Coaches Face-Off in the live finale.; Best Tattoo of the Day: Alexis Kovacs; Bottom: Cam Pohl, Fon, Jake Ross; Eliminated: Fon
164	9	"Drawing Alliances"	August 6, 2019	0.58
Skill of the Week: Composition; Flash Challenge: Coaching each team respectively are James Vaughn of season 1 and 7 as well as Megan Jean Morris of season 7. The teams are challenged to create a 3-D sculpture with half a million toothpicks.; Winner: Women's Team; Elimination Tattoo: The artists must create freehand tattoos, creating designs that flow with the area they are tattooing. With Ash eliminated, Megan advances to the Coaches Face-Off in the live finale.; Best Tattoo of the Day: Laura Marie; Bottom: Alexis Kovacs, Creepy Jason, Ash Mann; Eliminated: Ash Mann
165	10	"By Accident or By Design"	August 13, 2019	0.59
Skill of the Week: Adaptability; Elimination Tattoo: Each team must tattoo a design done by the opposing team. After they were also tasked with tattooing their own design as well.; Best Tattoo of the Day: Creepy Jason; Bottom: Jake Ross, Janelle Hansen, Alexis Kovacs; Eliminated: Alexis Kovacs
166	11	"Roll of the Dice"	August 20, 2019	0.68
Skill of the Week: Detail; Flash Challenge: Nikki Simpson of season 8 and Josh Payne, winner of season 10, coach both men's and women's teams respectively. The teams are challenged with creating a mosaic out of dice.; Winner: Women's Team; Elimination Tattoo: The artists are challenged to create cover up tattoos whilst showing detail. With Janelle's elimination, Nikki advances into the Coaches Face-Off in the live finale.; Best Tattoo of the Day: Creepy Jason; Bottom: Holli Marie, Janelle Hanson, Cam Pohl; Eliminated: Janelle Hanson
167	12	"Put Your Ink Where Your Mouth Is"	August 27, 2019	0.67
Skill of the Week: Marketability; Elimination Tattoo 1: Each canvas was interviewed by the artists about the tattoo the canvas wanted done. Going by order in where they stood in line, the canvas picked the artist they wanted to tattoo them and if multiple canvas' wanted that artist, the artist picked who they tattooed.; Elimination Tattoo 2: The previous tattoo each artist had done were displayed to four canvases and the three artists who weren't picked were up for elimination. Afterwards, the judges looked at the two tattoos done by each artist to determine if they were safe from elimination and only Creepy Jason was granted immunity.; Artists Not Chosen: Laura Marie, Pon, Cam Pohl; Artists Chosen: Dani Ryan, Jake Ross, Holli Marie, Creepy Jason; Safe from Elimination: Creepy Jason; Elimination Tattoo 3: The remaining artists were tasked with creating two tattoos with different styles, preferably styles the artists hadn't already done in the competition.; Eliminated: Holli Marie
168	13	"Moving Pictures"	September 3, 2019	0.58
Skill of the Week: Finesse; Flash Challenge: The artists get the chance to design custom wheelchair spoke guards.; Winner: Pon; Elimination Tattoo: The remaining artists are challenged to tattoo the back of the neck.; Best Tattoo of the Day: Laura Marie; Bottom: Cam Pohl, Dani Ryan, Creepy Jason; Eliminated: Cam Pohl
169	14	"Unfriendly Fire"	September 10, 2019	0.58
Skill of the Week: Precision; Flash Challenge: Create a work of art using paintball marker and seven different colors of paintballs.; Winner: Men's Team; Elimination Tattoo: The final five had to carefully apply precision in traditional illustrative portrait tattoos.; Best Tattoo of the Day: Dani Ryan; Bottom: Creepy Jason, Pon, Laura Marie; Eliminated: Pon
170	15	"Step Up or Shut Up"	September 17, 2019	0.55
Tattoo Marathon: The artists must compete in a tattoo marathon. Each artist designed a tattoo and style must be completed in 90 minutes. All the artists were required to tattoo each design. At the end of the marathon the judges determined that no artist had earned a spot in the finale.; Elimination Tattoo: Each artist had to tattoo a design one of their fellow artists had completed and the judges deemed was their best work so far in the competition.; Best Tattoo of the Day: Dani Ryan; Bottom: Creepy Jason, Jake Ross, Laura Marie; Eliminated: Jake Ross
171	16	"Battle of the Sexes Finale"	September 24, 2019	0.65
The three finalists reveal their 36 hour Master Canvas.: Coaches Face Off Winner: Ryan Ashley; 3rd Place: Creepy Jason; Runner-Up: Dani Ryan; Winner: Laura Marie
