= Tatu Baby =

American tattoo artist and reality television personality

- Born: Katherine Flores; October 28, 1987 (age 38); Miami, Florida, U.S.
- Other name: Kat Flores
- Occupations: Tattoo artist; reality television personality
- Known for: Ink Master; Cartel Crew
- Children: 2

Katherine "Kat" Flores (born October 28, 1987), known professionally as Tatu Baby, is an American tattoo artist and reality television personality. She was a contestant on Ink Master season 2 in 2012, where she placed fourth, and season 3 of the same show in 2013, where she placed third. She starred as a main cast member in Cartel Crew (2019–2021), another reality television show based on people who have connections to drug cartels. Tatu Baby remains active as a tattoo artist in Miami, Florida.

== Early life ==
Katherine "Tatu Baby" Flores was born October 28, 1987, in Miami, Florida, to Colombian parents. Tatu Baby's father, a drug kingpin in Queens, New York, was killed when Tatu Baby was four years old. She does not reveal the name of her father on Cartel Crew; Distractify called him "infamous" and the Telegraph stated he was a "colleague of Pablo Escobar", the Colombian drug lord. After her father died, Tatu Baby's mother wanted to get out of the drug business for the safety of her family.

== Career ==
Tatu Baby started tattooing professionally at age 19. She names Nikko Hurtado, Jose Lopez, and Steve Butcher as inspirations. With six years of experience, she got cast in the reality tattooing competition show Ink Master for their second season. In doing so, Devon Preston from Inked Magazine stated Tatu Baby "...helped to open doors for thousands of women pursuing careers in tattooing." She made it fourth in the competition and was invited back for the third season of the show. Screen Rant writer Gabriela Torres ranked Tatu Baby's tattoo depicting a Hindu goddess with eight arms atop a lion during season 3 as the seventh worst tattoo of the series overall, writing, "The result was less than fascinating. Tatu Baby's lion ended up looking more like a cartoon instead of a majestic jungle cat." For the finale of season 3, she designed and tattooed a wolf and Native American woman above a tomahawk as a backpiece. She placed third in the show overall.

After Ink Master season 3 ended, Tatu Baby opened her own shop, called Till the End Tattoos in Miami, Florida. Teen Vogue wrote, "The studio has a range of artists who specialize in custom designs, black-and-gray work and realism, so even if you can't get Tatu Baby herself (she's definitely in high demand), you're pretty much guaranteed to find someone else you're into."

In 2019, Tatu Baby was cast as a main cast member in the VH1 series Cartel Crew, which follows the lives of family members connected to drug lords and cartels. She continued on the series for their second season, also released in 2019.

In August 2020, Tatu Baby tattooed Puerto Rican rapper Anuel AA and Colombian singer Karol G. Anuel AA got "Fear God" above his right eyebrow with a cross beneath it, while Karol G got a butterfly on her right arm and "+57" and "1991" on her right hand. Other celebrities Tatu Baby has tattooed include singers Dalex, Jason Derulo, Luis Fonsi, and Rick Ross, former professional basketball player Dwyane Wade, boxer Canelo Álvarez and so on. Tess Adamakos of Inked Magazine named Tatu Baby one of the 10 leading names in the tattoo world. VH1 wrote "The talented Tatu Baby is one of the top Latina tattoo artists in the U.S."

== Personal life ==
Tatu Baby has one child with her ex-boyfriend Eddie Soto, a son named Deniro Roman Soto. As of 2023, she is in a relationship with former American football linebacker Anthony Chickillo. They married in 2025.

Tatu Baby has a number of tattoos herself. She has been tattooed by Billy Vegas, Shane O'Neill, David Gonzalez, Johnny Quintana (right upper arm), Boog (masquerade girl on her outer forearm), Jon Mesa (rose and diamond on the right side of her neck), Hector Arriaga (lower left arm), Mike Dargas (left hand), and Jime Litwalk (owl on her right thigh).

== Filmography ==
Year	Title	Role	Notes
2012	Ink Master season 2	Self	Fourth place
2013	Ink Master season 3	Self	Third place
2014	Ink Master: Merry Ink	Self	Television special
2017	Ink Master: Angels	Self	
2017	Black Ink Crew	Self	Episode: "Ride the Sky Train"
2019–2021	Cartel Crew	Self	Main cast (seasons 1–3)
