= Ink Master =

American reality competition series

- Genre: Reality television
- Presented by: Dave Navarro; Joel Madden
- Judges: Chris Núñez; Oliver Peck; Ryan Ashley; Nikko Hurtado; Ami James; DJ Tambe
- Narrated by: Matt Knight; Rick Robles
- Theme music composer: Vanacore Music, Inc
- Country of origin: United States
- Original language: English
- No. of seasons: 17
- No. of episodes: 223

Production
- Executive producers: Steven Weinstock; Glenda Hersh; Andrea Richter
- Production locations: Jersey City, New Jersey, U.S.
- Cinematography: Brett Knott; Ariel Boles
- Editors: Tony Nigro; Matthew Bartus; Kevin Moore; Sean Gill; Mark Hervey; David S. Tung; Alanna Yudin; Jon LeClaire; Jim Gaynor
- Camera setup: Multi-camera
- Running time: 40–83 minutes
- Production companies: Truly Original; MTV Entertainment Studios (2022–24); Spike Cable Networks (2012–18)

Original release
- Network: Spike
- Release: January 17, 2012 – January 16, 2018
- Network: Paramount Network
- Release: January 23, 2018 – April 14, 2020
- Network: Paramount+
- Release: September 7, 2022 – present

Related
- Ink Master: Redemption; Ink Master: Angels; Ink Master: Grudge Match

Ink Master is an American reality competition television series that premiered on Spike on January 17, 2012.

Each season features tattoo artists who compete in various challenges assessing their tattooing and related artistic skills. They are judged by renowned tattoo artists and enthusiasts, with one or more contestants eliminated each episode.

The last contestant standing in seasons 1-13 received a $100,000 prize, the title of Ink Master, and a feature in Inked magazine. Starting in season 14, the monetary prize rose to $250,000.

The series is produced by Original Media, which also produced the reality show Miami Ink. Current seasons air on the Paramount+ Streaming service, and 24/7 on the Pluto TV app, which has a channel dedicated entirely to the show.

Four spin-off shows, titled Ink Shrinks, Ink Master: Redemption, Ink Master: Angels and Ink Master: Grudge Match, have also been released. The series has also released a number of special standalone episodes themed around upcoming events or holidays, such as Halloween.

On September 22, 2020, Paramount Network cancelled the series, as part of the network's then-planned shift to movies. On December 1, 2020, the first two seasons were made available to stream on Netflix in the United States. They were later removed on December 1, 2021, and replaced with seasons three and four. On February 24, 2021, it was announced that the series would be revived by Paramount+. On August 5, 2022, it was announced that the revival would premiere on September 7, 2022. A fifteenth season premiered on November 1, 2023. The sixteenth season, titled OGs vs Young Guns, premiered on October 29, 2024. The seventeenth season, titled Hometown Heroes, premiered on October 29, 2025.

== Show format ==
=== Basic format ===
All episodes aside from the finales have the following format, with some minor variations to the application of the format:

First, a Flash Challenge will be evaluated based on how well an artist met the week's skill. Some Flash Challenges involve tattooing, but typically, flash challenges do not incorporate the act of tattooing; but instead will require a non-related artistic skill (i.e., painting, haircutting, etching, burning, etc.) The winner of the flash challenge wins the right to select their human canvas in the elimination challenge and, as of season two, pair up the other contestants with their human canvases.

After the Flash Challenge comes the Elimination Challenge, a further test of the week's skill on a human canvas, typically incorporating a prominent style of tattooing. Once the contestants are paired up with their canvases, they are given the day to consult with their assignment. Each contestant is given four to six hours to tattoo their design the next day. Once completed, the contestants meet as a group with the judges and are critiqued one by one. The contestants then are dismissed, with four later being called back. The four typically represent a week's top two and bottom two, though this breakdown can change. At the end of each episode, a winner generally is declared, and one contestant is eliminated.

=== Special format ===
The final challenge was a marathon tattooing of up to 18 hours for the finale of season one. The season two finale did not share this format. Instead, it consisted of the three finalists meeting with their respective canvases for four six-hour sessions to create a final piece. This final piece did not require a specific tattoo genre or location for the artist to tattoo. Instead, the artists could choose those aspects for themselves, and the only restriction they faced was a time limit. The season three finale followed a similar format to the season two finale. However, the artists were allowed five seven-hour sessions for a cumulative 35-hour master canvas tattoo.

=== Judging ===
Musician Dave Navarro and tattoo artists Chris Núñez and Oliver Peck served as the show's primary judges, with Navarro also serving as a host for the show. Navarro and Núñez appeared in every episode, while Peck was absent on two episodes of season nine when he was recovering from a heart attack. Some episodes incorporate a fourth guest judge, usually a well-known tattoo artist who has knowledge or reputation in the style of tattoo (including new school, old school, Japanese, portrait, black and gray, etc.) chosen for the week's elimination challenge.

Season two judging was taken to a new level with audience voting participation through the series' official website and via Facebook voting, with the audience vote affecting the final ruling by the judges. Sebastian Murphy was eliminated from consideration by the judges in the season finale because he was the contestant whose work in the elimination challenges received the fewest votes by the audience. Season three introduced the human canvas jury. The human canvases review each other's tattoos and nominate the artist who did the worst piece for elimination. Season four introduced the elimination challenge winner's selection, where the challenge winner picks an artist for elimination. Season 6 introduced the judges getting the final say of who wins and who goes home.

In January 2020, Oliver Peck was forced out of his spot as an Ink Master judge following a controversy involving his reemerged blackface photo from his MySpace page. There was no word of a replacement before the series was initially canceled.

On August 5, 2022, new judges were announced for the revival series, including season 8 winner, Ryan Ashley, tattoo artists Nikko Hurtado and Ami James. Hurtado had previously been a guest judge in the series, while James had appeared in Miami Ink, alongside Núñez. Joel Madden was announced as the new host for the upcoming season, with Navarro returning as "Master of Chaos", adding twists and game-changing bombs to each episode.

Three time champion, DJ Tambe, joins the judging panel for its fifteenth season, replacing James. Navarro did not return for the season, making it the first season he is absent from. He cited health issues, particularly COVID-19, as why he departed the series, in addition to taking a break from Jane's Addiction.

=== Timeline ===
Color key

Host & judge
Judge
Guest judge
Contestant
Coach
Master of Chaos

Ink Master judges
Judge	Seasons																
Judge	1	2	3	4	5	6	7	8	9	10	11	12	13	14	15	16	17
Dave Navarro																	
Chris Nuñez																	
Oliver Peck																	
Joel Madden																	
Nikko Hurtado																	
Ami James																	
Ryan Ashley																	
DJ Tambe																	

== Series overview ==
Season	Contestants	First aired	Last aired	Winner(s)	Runner(s)-up	Third place
1	10	January 17, 2012	March 6, 2012	Shane O'Neill	Tommy Helm	James Vaughn
2	16	October 9, 2012	December 18, 2012	Steve Tefft	Sarah Miller	Sebastian Murphy
3	16	July 16, 2013	October 8, 2013	Joey Hamilton	Jime Litwalk	Katherine "Tatu Baby" Flores
4	17	February 25, 2014	May 20, 2014	Scott Marshall	Walter "Sausage" Frank	Matti Hixson
5	18	September 2, 2014	December 16, 2014	Jason Clay Dunn	James "Cleen Rock One" Steinke	Erik Siuda
6	18	June 23, 2015	October 13, 2015	Dave Kruseman	Chris Blinston	Matt O'Baugh
7	16	March 1, 2016	May 24, 2016	Anthony Michaels	James "Cleen Rock One" Steinke	Christian Buckingham
8	18	August 23, 2016	December 6, 2016	Ryan Ashley	Gian Karle Cruz	Kelly Doty
9	36	June 6, 2017	September 26, 2017	Old Town Ink (Aaron "Bubba" Irwin and DJ Tambe)	Black Cobra Tattoos (Katie McGowan and Matt O'Baugh)	Basilica Tattoo (Christian Buckingham and Noelin Wheeler)
10	18	January 9, 2018	April 24, 2018	Josh Payne	Juan Salgado	Roly T-Rex
11	18	August 28, 2018	December 18, 2018	Tony Medellin	Teej Poole	Tiffer Wright
12	18	June 11, 2019	September 24, 2019	Laura Marie	Dani Ryan	Creepy Jason
13	20	January 7, 2020	April 14, 2020	N/A (Note: The live finale was canceled as a result of the COVID-19 pandemic. The three finalists (Bob Jones, Angel Rose, and Jimmy Snaz) were awarded a monetary prize, but none were named Ink Master.)		
14	14	September 7, 2022	November 2, 2022	DJ Tambe	Gian Karle Cruz	Bob Jones
15	15	November 1, 2023	December 20, 2023	Bobby Johnson	Freddie Albrighton	Jon Mesa
16	16	October 23, 2024	December 11, 2024	James Tex	Anthony Tex	Cat Castro
17	15	October 29, 2025	December 17, 2025	Matt Mooney	Isnard Barbosa	Luka Lajoie

== Specials ==
Various standalone holiday and special event-themed episodes have been made that do not follow the series seasons. They have typically followed an upcoming or recently passed holiday. These episodes feature previous Ink Master contestants competing for smaller cash prizes.

Ink Master licensed a Dutch/Belgian edition called Ink Master: Meesters van de Lage Landen (Masters of the Low Countries) to Spike NL in 2017. The format remains largely intact; filming occurs mainly around Amsterdam. The winner of the first season of this edition was the Belgian contestant "Djoels". The second season takes place in IJmuiden and was won by Belgian contestant Joyce.

== Spin-offs ==
=== Ink Master: Redemption ===
The spin-off series Ink Master: Redemption premiered in September 2015. The spin-off features canvases who are unhappy with the tattoo they received during the competition. After discussing their tattoo with Navarro, the canvases are given a chance to confront the artist who did the original piece. The artist is offered the chance for redemption by being able to consult with the canvas on a new tattoo (or modification to improve their existing Ink Master piece). After reviewing the artist's new drawing, the canvas is given a no-strings-attached choice to proceed with the new tattoo or leave the shop. Episodes sometimes feature a twist, such as rival artists returning to draw a design for the same unhappy canvas, potentially stealing the original artist's chance at redemption. Ink Master: Redemption was renewed for a second season to coincide with the premiere of Season 7 of Ink Master.

=== Ink Master: Angels ===
In June 2017, Spike announced a new spin-off series titled Ink Master: Angels. The premise follows four female contestants from the eighth season of Ink Master – season winner Ryan Ashley, Kelly Doty, Nikki Simpson, and Gia Rose – as they travel around the United States to face other artists in tattoo challenges with a spot on season ten of Ink Master on the line. The show premiered on October 3, 2017.

=== Ink Master: Grudge Match ===
On August 21, 2019, it was announced that a spin-off titled Ink Master: Grudge Match would premiere on October 1, 2019. Judges for the series include former Ink Master contestants Cleen Rock One, DJ Tambe, and Ryan Ashley.

== See also ==
- List of tattoo TV shows
