= Nikko Hurtado =

American tattoo artist (born 1981)

- Born: Nicholas Humberto Hurtado; March 12, 1981 (age 44); San Fernando Valley, California, U.S.
- Other names: Nicholas, Nick
- Occupations: Tattoo artist; reality television personality

Nicholas Humberto Hurtado, known as Nikko Hurtado, is an American tattoo artist who specializes in colored portraiture. His signature hyper-realistic color portraits have made him a renowned figure in the tattoo industry with a massive celebrity client list. He has numerous television appearances on shows such as LA Ink, Tattoo Wars, and Ink Master, becoming a judge on the lattermost in 2022. Hurtado is the founder of Black Anchor Collective in Hesperia, California, and Black Anchor Los Angeles in Hollywood, California, both within Black Anchor Worldwide.

== History ==
=== Background ===
Hurtado was born to a Mexican welder and a Hispanic housemaker in the San Fernando Valley, California, on March 12, 1981. Hurtado was drawn to art early and developed his drawing abilities through classes with his friend, tattooer Mike Demasi, at the Art Center of Pasadena. He was propelled into a tattooing career by a visit to Demasi in his Art Junkies Tattoo Studio in Hesperia. It was there where he started apprenticing in 2002. He has tattooed around the globe and given many instructional seminars about the use of his color theory and technique.

==== Personal life ====
Hurtado is married to Joanne, the mother of his three children.

=== Career ===
Hurtado opened his own tattoo shop in 2010, Black Anchor Collective in Hesperia. He opened a new Black Anchor location on Melrose Ave in Los Angeles, California, in 2017. He has been featured on LA Ink and Ink Master, as well as several instructional DVDs. Hurtado has become known as a go-to artist for color realism tattoos. His celebrity clients include Vanessa Bryant, Sean Combs, Dwayne Johnson, Drake, and Wale.

==== Awards & Recognition ====
Hurtado first gained tattoo recognition in 2003 when a client entered the Pomona Tattoo Portrait Contest and he placed first with his color rendition of Batman.

In 2012, Hurtado participated as a jury member for the Chaudesaigues Award, an award that recognizes the career and the artistic choices of a tattoo artist.

Hurtado's first solo art show was titled "Renati" and shown at Copro Gallery in Santa Monica, California, in 2013.

==== TV Appearances ====
Hurtado appeared on three episodes of LA Ink with Kat Von D.

In 2022, Hurtado became a judge on the 14th season of Ink Master, which began airing on September 7, 2022. Hurtado returned as a judge for season 15, which premiered on November 1, 2023. Season 16 premiered on October 23, 2024.

== See also ==
- List of tattoo artists
