= Ryan Ashley =

American tattoo artist (born 1987)

- Born: April 29, 1987 (age 39)
- Education: Fashion Institute of Technology
- Occupation: Tattoo artist
- Spouse: Arlo DiCristina (m. 2019)
- Children: 1

Ryan Ashley DiCristina (née Malarkey, born April 29, 1987), known as Ryan Ashley, is an American tattoo artist known for her appearances on the television shows Ink Master and its spin-offs. Her signature style reflects her training and experience as a fashion designer: Ashley specializes in black-and-gray designs with beadwork, lace detail, and ornamental jewels. Ashley won Ink Master's season eight competition in 2016 and in the following years returned to host a spin-off show (Angels), judge another spin-off (Grudge Match), and judge in the main series. She co-owns a tattoo shop in Grand Junction, Colorado.

== Early life and career ==
Ashley was raised in Dallas, a small borough in northeast Pennsylvania. Her single mother worked at a fast food restaurant while taking night school in accounting. Ashley's mother, who was also an artist, taught her how to draw. She graduated from Fashion Institute of Technology in 2007 and spent five years as a fashion designer in New York City at a private label, where she designed beadwork, lace details, embroidery, and appliqués for garments. Her intricate tattoo style would later reflect these themes.

Seeking a career outside of a traditional office environment, Ashley returned to Pennsylvania to apprentice as a tattoo artist. Her experience working at a street shop (a tattoo parlor that takes walk-in requests) convinced her to only work by appointment. Ashley and Josh Balz, her then partner, opened a shop in Kingston, Pennsylvania, in 2013, The Strange and Unusual Oddities Parlor. Ashley tattooed from the back of the shop while the front featured their collection of taxidermy, objects, and restored antiques for sale. The latter had been a hobby from her youth, when she had attended yard and estate sales with her mother and grandmother. The couple opened a second shop in Philadelphia with taxidermist business partners.

Ashley's signature black-and-gray tattoo designs feature beadwork, lace detail, and ornamental jewels. When designing filigree, she references Victorian furniture scrollwork. She references bridal accessories and chandeliers for her beading designs, and old, illustrated wildlife books for animal and bird designs. Her clients have included rock musicians Maria Brink and Ash Costello.

=== Ink Master ===
In late 2016, Ashley appeared on Ink Master, a reality competition television series in which tattoo artists participate in artistic challenges to outlast other competitors and receive the season's title and monetary prize. Ashley was the eighth season's champion, the first woman to win the title. Mic noted the occasion as a moment for female tattoo artists, who are subject to social stigmas in a male-dominated profession. Under Ashley, the women on the show formed an alliance to outlast their competitors. The show's executive producer said it was the first time such an alliance had held throughout the season. With only five years of tattoo experience, she won the title as a relative newcomer. She entered the show to develop new areas of tattooing expertise and test herself. She had been approached to participate in previous seasons of the show, but declined for scheduling conflicts.

Ashley is featured in the two seasons of Ink Master: Angels, a spin-off from Ink Master in which Ashley and several co-competitors from the main series' eighth season traveled across the United States to face off against local tattoo artists. Winners received spots in the next season of Ink Master. The show appeared on Paramount Network in 2017 and 2018. Angels was originally planned as a one-hour special with the same premise, but expanded into a full-season spin-off. Ashley later served as a judge in another spin-off, Ink Master: Grudge Match (2019). As part of the show's revamped format, Ashley returned to Ink Master as a judge in 2022 (season 14) and continued into the 15th season the next year.

She owns Elysium Studios, a tattoo parlor in a restored church in Grand Junction, Colorado, with her husband. Elysium hosts tattoo guest and resident artists based on Ashley's connections with Ink Master.

== Personal life ==
Ashley was formerly engaged to Josh Balz, former keyboardist in the metal band Motionless in White. She married tattooer Arlo DiCristina in late 2019. Their son, Atheus, was born in May 2020. She announced both her relationship with DiCristina and her pregnancy on covers of Inked magazine.

She returned to New York City in 2018. As of 2019, she lives and works in Grand Junction, Colorado, where she and DiCristina own Elysium Studios.

Ashley posted to her Instagram account on May 30, 2024, that she was going through a divorce.
