= Ink Master season 9 =

Ink Master: Shop Wars
- Season 9
- Hosted by: Dave Navarro
- Judges: Chris Núñez; Oliver Peck
- No. of contestants: 36
- Winners: Old Town Ink (Bubba Irwin and DJ Tambe)
- No. of episodes: 16

Release
- Original network: Spike
- Original release: June 6 – September 26, 2017

Season chronology
- ← Previous; Peck vs Nuñez Next → Return of the Masters

Ink Master: Shop Wars is the ninth season of the tattoo reality competition Ink Master that premiered on June 6, 2017, on Spike with 16 episodes. The show is hosted and judged by Jane's Addiction guitarist Dave Navarro, with accomplished tattoo artists Chris Núñez and Oliver Peck serving as series regular judges. The winning shop received $200,000, a feature in Inked magazine, the title of Ink Master, and the title of Master Shop.

The premise of this season was having teams of two sorted by their tattoo shops going head-to-head in a tag team elimination-style competition. This season features nine rookie shops battling nine veteran shops each week while tackling a skill that exposes each of the veterans' shortcomings from the last time they competed.

This season saw the return of thirteen veterans; season 1 contestant Tommy Helm, season 2 contestant Lalo Yunda, season 3 contestants Yovan "E.S." Barraza and Richard "Made Rich" Parker, season 4 contestants Aaron "Bubba" Irwin and Josh "King Ruck" Glover, season 5 contestant Aaron "Aaron Is" Michalowski, season 5 and season 7 contestant James "Cleen Rock One" Steinke, season 6 contestants Katie McGowan and Matt O'Baugh, season 7 contestants Christian Buckingham and Picasso Dular, and season 8 contestant Anwon "Boneface" Johnson.

The winners of the ninth season of Ink Master were Old Town Ink (Aaron "Bubba" Irwin and DJ Tambe), with Black Cobra Tattoos (Katie McGowan and Matt O'Baugh) being the runners-up.

== Judging and ranking ==
=== Judging Panel ===
The judging panel is a table of three or more primary judges. The judges make their final decision by voting to see who had best tattoo of the day, who's going home and who wins the competition.

=== Jury of Peers ===
The shops critique each other's work to see who had the worst tattoo of the day that will send one of them to the bottom.

== Contestants ==
The competition featured a total of 36 contestants who competed in teams of two (18 teams total). Each team acted as one throughout the competition, winning together, and losing together.

Shop names, contestant names, and cities stated are at time of filming.

Shop Name	Contestants	Years of experience	Hometown	Outcome
Old Town Ink	DJ Tambe	20	Scottsdale, Arizona	Winners
Old Town Ink	Aaron "Bubba" Irwin	10	Scottsdale, Arizona	Winners
Black Cobra Tattoos	Katie McGowan	7	Sherwood, Arkansas	Runners-up
Black Cobra Tattoos	Matt O'Baugh	16	Sherwood, Arkansas	Runners-up
Basilica Tattoo	Christian Buckingham	13	Las Vegas, Nevada	3rd place
Basilica Tattoo	Noelin Wheeler	21	Las Vegas, Nevada	3rd place
Unkindness Art	Erin Chance	10	Richmond, Virginia	4th place
Unkindness Art	Jerrett "Doom Kitten" Querubin	7	Richmond, Virginia	4th place
Golden Skull Tattoo	Aaron "Aaron Is" Michalowski	19	Las Vegas, Nevada	5th place
Golden Skull Tattoo	James "Cleen Rock One" Steinke	21	Las Vegas, Nevada	5th place
Empire State Studio	Tommy Helm	?	Amityville, New York	6th place
Empire State Studio	Marvin Silva	13	Amityville, New York	6th place
Allegory Arts	Ulyss Blair	12	Florence, Alabama	7th place
Allegory Arts	Eva Huber	14	Florence, Alabama	7th place
Artistic Skin Designs	April Nicole	6	Indianapolis, Indiana	8th place
Artistic Skin Designs	Dane Smith	7	Indianapolis, Indiana	8th place
Classic Trilogy Tattoo	Thom Bulman	10	Mattydale, New York	9th place
Classic Trilogy Tattoo	Derek Zielinski	12	Mattydale, New York	9th place
Pinz & Needlez	Jessy Knuckles	6	Edgewood, Maryland	10th place
Pinz & Needlez	Allisin Riot	4	Edgewood, Maryland	10th place
Black Spade Tattoo	Yovan "E.S." Barraza	20	Las Vegas, Nevada	11th place
Black Spade Tattoo	Josh "King Ruck" Glover	9	Las Vegas, Nevada	11th place
Boneface Ink Tattoo Shop	Brandon "Hobo Ink" Allen †	?	Pensacola, Florida	12th place
Boneface Ink Tattoo Shop	Anwon "Boneface" Johnson	18	Pensacola, Florida	12th place
House of Monkey Tattoo	Picasso Dular	17	Brooklyn, New York	13th place
House of Monkey Tattoo	Lalo Yunda	25	Brooklyn, New York	13th place
Think Before You Ink	Richard "Made Rich" Parker	9	Queens, New York	14th place
Think Before You Ink	Derrick "Dtatstar" Verley	?	Queens, New York	14th place
Tri-Cities Tattoo	Danger Dave	8	Atlanta, Georgia	15th place
Tri-Cities Tattoo	Chavonna "Bang" Rhodes	4	Atlanta, Georgia	15th place
Black Anchor Collective	Carlos Rojas	15	Hesperia, California	16th place
Black Anchor Collective	Aric Taylor	26	Hesperia, California	16th place
The Marked Society Tattoo	Wes Hogan	17	McDonough, Georgia	17th place
The Marked Society Tattoo	Mike P	5	McDonough, Georgia	17th place
Thicker Than Blood	Jhon Campuzano	8	White Plains, New York	18th place
Thicker Than Blood	Babiery Hernandez	5	White Plains, New York	18th place

=== Returning veterans ===
Contestants	Original Season	Original Placement
Yovan "E.S." Barraza	Season 3	9th place
Christian Buckingham	Season 7	3rd place
Picasso Dular	Season 7	13th place
Josh "King Ruck" Glover	Season 4	9th/10th place
Tommy Helm	Season 1	Runner-up
Aaron "Bubba" Irwin	Season 4	11th/12th place
Anwon "Boneface" Johnson	Season 8	7th place
Katie McGowan	Season 6	8th place
Aaron "Aaron Is" Michalowski	Season 5	6th place
Matt O'Baugh	Season 6	3rd place
Richard "Made Rich" Parker	Season 3	10th place
James "Cleen Rock One" Steinke	Season 5	Runner-up
James "Cleen Rock One" Steinke	Season 7	Runner-up
Lalo Yunda	Season 2	10th place

== Shop progress ==
Indicates a Newcomer shop. Indicates a Veteran shop.

Shop	Episode															
Shop	1	2 (Note: Old Town Ink were among the top in the challenge, but were put in the bottom by the Jury of Peers.)	3	4	5	6	7	8	9	10	11 (Note: Basilica Tattoo, Golden Skull Tattoo and Old Town Ink defeated Artistic Skin Designs in the Tag-team Face-Off challenge to determine which shop would stay in the competition.)	12	13 (Note: Basilica Tattoo won Best Tattoo of the Day in the first round, while Unkindness Art won Best Tattoo of the Day in the second round.)	14	15 (Note: Basilica Tattoo and Black Cobra Tattoos won the first round, and Old Town Ink won the second round in the Tattoo Marathon to advance to the finale.)	16
Old Town Ink		BTM3	HIGH	HIGH	WIN	LOW	WIN	SAFE	LOW	HIGH	BTM4	BTM3	BTM4	WIN	ADV	Winner
Black Cobra Tattoos								HIGH	TOP2	SAFE	WIN	TOP2	BTM4	BTM3	ADV	Runner-up
Basilica Tattoo							SAFE	SAFE	WIN	SAFE	BTM4	HIGH	WIN	BTM3	ADV	Eliminated
Unkindness Art	SAFE	SAFE	SAFE	WIN	SAFE	TOP2	TOP2	BTM3	SAFE	LOW	WIN	BTM3	WIN	TOP2	ELIM	Guest
Golden Skull Tattoo										WIN	BTM4	WIN	BTM4	ELIM		Guest
Empire State Studio									BTM3	TOP2	WIN	SAFE	ELIM			Guest
Allegory Arts	SAFE	TOP3	SAFE	BTM3	SAFE	SAFE	SAFE	BTM3	BTM3	BTM3	WIN	ELIM				Guest
Artistic Skin Designs	WIN	WIN	TOP2	SAFE	SAFE	SAFE	BTM3	WIN	HIGH	BTM3	ELIM					Guest
Classic Trilogy Tattoo	SAFE	SAFE	SAFE	SAFE	BTM3	BTM3	LOW	TOP2	HIGH	ELIM						Guest
Pinz & Needlez	SAFE	LOW	WIN	TOP2	BTM3	WIN	SAFE	SAFE	ELIM							Guest
Black Spade Tattoo					LOW	BTM3	BTM3	ELIM								Guest
Boneface Ink Tattoo Shop						HIGH	ELIM									Guest
House of Monkey Tattoo				SAFE	SAFE	ELIM										Guest
Think Before You Ink			BTM3	BTM3	ELIM											Guest
Tri-Cities Tattoo	BTM3	BTM3	BTM3	ELIM												Guest
Black Anchor Collective	TOP2	SAFE	ELIM													Guest
The Marked Society Tattoo	BTM3	ELIM														Guest
Thicker Than Blood	ELIM															Guest

The shop won Ink Master.
The shop was the runner-up.
The shop was eliminated during the finale.
The shop advanced to the finale
The shop was exempt from the first elimination.
The shop won Best Tattoo of the Day.
The shop was among the top.
The shop received positive critiques.
The shop received negative critiques.
The shop was in the bottom.
The shop was put in the bottom by the Jury of Peers
The shop was eliminated from the competition.
The shop was put in the bottom by the Jury of Peers and were eliminated from the competition.
The shop returned as a guest for that episode.

== Episodes ==
No. overall	No. in season	Title	Original release date	US viewers (millions)
109	1	"Fire & Ice"	June 6, 2017	0.90
Flash Challenge – Part 1: After the artists meet Dave, Peck and Nunez at Skylands Stadium, they go into their very first Flash Challenge where they had four hours to create an ice sculpture that represents their respective shop. But that of course is not the only Flash Challenge they faced.; Winner: Allegory Arts; Flash Challenge – Part 2: The rest of the shops, except for Allegory Arts, carve out their custom logo before molding it out of molten metal. Another shop will also be safe from elimination.; Winner: Unkindness Art; Elimination Tattoo: The shops drew one of the animals as their live reference. They will then tattoo their animal in the style they picked. Thicker Than Blood, however, took a different approach and drew their tattoo without incorporating the live snake.; Top Shops: Artistic Skin Designs and Black Anchor Collective; Best Tattoo of the Day: Artistic Skin Designs; Bottom: Tri-Cities Tattoo, The Marked Society Tattoo and Thicker Than Blood; Eliminated: Thicker Than Blood
110	2	"Crossing the Line"	June 13, 2017	0.77
Returning Veteran: Bubba Irwin; Skill of the Week: Fundamentals; Flash Challenge: The shops had five hours to create an original design out of colored Post-it notes. Before the challenge began, Dave brought out Old Town Ink (Bubba Irwin and DJ Tambe), the first veteran shop that took over Thicker than Blood's spot in the competition. During the critique, Wes broke down due to not being at home for family reasons.; Winner: Old Town Ink; Elimination Tattoo: The shops put their fundamental skills to the test when they have to tattoo an illustrative blackwork design. Old Town Ink got sent to the bottom by the Jury of Peers because they used a Magnum needle as well as a Lining needle, but the judges decided to make them safe from being eliminated.; Top Shops: Allegory Arts, Old Town Ink and Artistic Skin Designs.; Best Tattoo of the Day: Artistic Skin Designs; Bottom: Old Town Ink, Tri-Cities Tattoo and The Marked Society Tattoo; Eliminated: The Marked Society Tattoo
111	3	"Unnatural Disasters"	June 20, 2017	0.89
Returning Veteran: Made Rich; Skill of the Week: Detail; Flash Challenge: The shops had five hours to turn one image into another with one artist working on one side while their partner worked on the other.; Winner: Unkindness Art; Elimination Tattoo: The shops must show detail in their natural disaster tattoo.; Best Tattoo of the Day: Pinz & Needlez; Bottom: Think Before You Ink, Black Anchor Collective and Tri-Cities Tattoo; Eliminated: Black Anchor Collective
112	4	"Lend Me Your Ear"	June 27, 2017	0.89
Returning Veterans: Lalo and Picasso; Skill of the Week: Technical Application; Flash Challenge: The shops had two hours to create identical micro ear tattoos. Since winning the last Elimination Tattoo, Pinz and Needles picked their canvas first while the rest of the canvases handled their skull picks.; Winner: Old Town Ink; Elimination Tattoo: The shops tattoo a pair of black and grey cherubs at the same time. Since the judges were divided in choosing the winner, it was clear that one individual from each shop were the standouts in this Elimination Tattoo.; Top Shops: Unkindness Art and Pinz & Needlez; Best Tattoo of the Day: Unkindness Art; Bottom: Think Before You Ink, Tri-Cities Tattoo and Allegory Arts; Eliminated: Tri-Cities Tattoo
113	5	"War and Ink"	July 11, 2017	0.89
Returning Veterans: King Ruck and E.S.; Skill of the Week: Composition; Flash Challenge Inspired by Corona Extra, the shops had four hours to help give the canvas the moment they lived.; Winner: Artistic Skin Designs; Elimination Tattoo: The shops go to war with color realistic battle scenes. But the battle for survival arises near the end when Pinz And Needles' canvas second guessing the design of her tattoo while Classic Trilogy Tattoo's canvas passed out.; Best Tattoo of the Day: Old Town Ink; Bottom: Think Before You Ink, Classic Trilogy Tattoo and Pinz & Needlez; Eliminated: Think Before You Ink
114	6	"Get the Flock Outta Here"	July 18, 2017	N/A
Returning Veteran: Boneface; Skill of the Week: Artistry; Flash Challenge: The shops had five hours to create a work of art by first drawing on a black inhesive board before using one of the colored velvet powder over their design.; Winner: Old Town Ink; Elimination Tattoo: Each shop must show their true artistry by doing a freehand tattoo. Each artist had three hours to draw the design on skin. Then, its respective partner will tattoo the drawn piece for six hours.; Top Shops: Unkindness Art and Pinz & Needlez; Best Tattoo of the Day: Pinz & Needlez; Bottom: Black Spade Tattoo, House of Monkey Tattoo and Classic Trilogy Tattoo; Eliminated: House of Monkey Tattoo
115	7	"On the Bubble"	July 25, 2017	N/A
Returning Veteran: Christian Buckingham; Skill of the Week: Ingenuity; Flash Challenge: The shops had five hours to create a design on a giant sheet of bubble wrap by carefully injecting ink into each bubble. During the critique, Thom of Classic Trilogy Tattoo called out Ulyss of Allegory Arts for using white out in the flash challenge, but it backfires on him.; Winner: Black Spade Tattoo; Elimination Tattoo: Each shop worked on a new school tattoo with one artist tattooing the first three hours and the other tattooing the last three hours.; Top Shops: Unkindness Art and Old Town Ink; Best Tattoo of the Day: Old Town Ink; Bottom: Boneface Ink Tattoo Shop, Black Spade Tattoo and Artistic Skin Designs; Eliminated: Boneface Ink Tattoo Shop
116	8	"Masterpiece Mayhem"	August 1, 2017	N/A
Returning Veterans: Matt O'Baugh and Katie McGowan; Skill of the Week: Consistency; Flash Challenge: An emotional flash challenge has the shops tattooing a replica of a little loved ones' condition onto its respective human canvas for three hours.; Winner: Unkindness Art; Elimination Tattoo: Matt and Katie's past comes back to haunt them as they and the remaining shops must to use consistency by tattooing a famous work of art.; Top Shops: Classic Trilogy Tattoo and Artistic Skin Designs; Best Tattoo of the Day: Artistic Skin Designs; Bottom: Allegory Arts, Black Spade Tattoo and Unkindness Art; Eliminated: Black Spade Tattoo
117	9	"Pin-Up Panic Attack"	August 8, 2017	N/A
Returning Veteran: Tommy Helm; Skill of the Week: Proportion/Perspectives; Flash Challenge: The shops had five hours to create a sculpture by adding more or less of their own plaster on to a canvas.; Winner: Black Cobra Tattoos; Elimination Tattoo: The shops tackle Tommy's least favorite design that exposed his weakness in proportion, a Pin-Up tattoo. The artist and its partner were each given 30 minutes to tattoo the same canvas. Peck did not co-judge due to medical emergency. During the elimination judging, Ulyss of Allegory Arts was forced to sit on a chair due to a panic attack during the elimination judging.; Top Shops: Basilica Tattoo and Black Cobra Tattoos; Best Tattoo of the Day: Basilica Tattoo; Bottom: Empire State Studio, Allegory Arts and Pinz & Needlez; Eliminated: Pinz & Needlez
118	10	"Drill Baby, Drill"	August 15, 2017	N/A
Guest Judge: Tommy Montoya; Returning Veterans: Cleen Rock One and Aaron Is; Skill of the Week: Precision; Flash Challenge: The shops had five hours to create a design by drilling different holes onto a wooden canvas. Tommy Montoya filled in for Oliver as the third judge for the flash challenge.; Winner: Black Cobra Tattoos; Elimination Tattoo: The shops get to work tattooing matching portraits on two different canvases. In the critique, Oliver Peck came back while Tommy became the guest judge for the elimination tattoo, and revealed that he had a heart attack which explains his absence from the last episode and the flash challenge.; Top Shops: Golden Skull Tattoo and Empire State Studio; Best Tattoo of the Day: Golden Skull Tattoo; Bottom: Allegory Arts, Classic Trilogy Tattoo and Artistic Skin Designs; Eliminated: Classic Trilogy Tattoo
119	11	"Grim Inker"	August 22, 2017	N/A
Skill of the Week: Adaptability; Elimination Tattoo: The final eight shops fight for survival as four shops must work together to tattoo the Four Horseman of the Apocalypse on the human canvas at the same time. However, only one artist from each shop will do the tattooing. The first team consisted of Tommy Helm from Empire State Tattoo, Erin Chance from Unkindness Art, Ulyss Blair from Allegory Arts and Matt O'Baugh from Black Cobra Tattoos while Noelin Wheeler from Basilica Tattoo, Cleen Rock One from Golden Skull Tattoo, DJ Tambe from Old Town Ink and April Nicole from Artistic Skin Designs round out the second team.; Best Tattoo of the Day: Empire State Studio, Black Cobra Tattoos, Allegory Arts and Unkindness Art; Face Off Tattoo: Golden Skull Tattoo, Basilica Tattoo, Old Town Ink and Artistic Skin Designs have to duke it out. This time, the artist who didn't participate in the elimination tattoo must use the adaptability to tattoo a free handed design.; Eliminated: Artistic Skin Designs
120	12	"Pit Fall"	August 29, 2017	N/A
Skill of the Week: Placement; Elimination Tattoo: The final seven shop deal with armpit tattoos by creating two six-hour coordinating pieces with one artist from each shop tattooing the left armpit and the other tattooing the right armpit the next day. In addition, Peck and Nuñez assigned the human canvases. For the second armpit tattoo, each shop had to switch canvases and finish another's shops tattoo, thus creating a head-to-head comparison.; Best Tattoo of the Day: Golden Skull Tattoo; Bottom: Allegory Arts, Unkindness Art, Old Town Ink; Eliminated: Allegory Arts
121	13	"Sell Out"	September 5, 2017	N/A
Skill of the Week: Self Promotion; Elimination Tattoo - Part 1: The power was put in the hands of the human canvases as each canvas had 5 minutes to interview each shop about a tattoo they would like to get. After the interviews, the canvases drew skulls to determine a picking order.; Best Tattoo of the Day: Basilica Tattoo; Elimination Tattoo - Part 2: The human canvases picked a random number on the bottom of the skull. They will then pick one of the tattoos that was done by its respective shop in part one of the elimination tattoo. Black Cobra Tattoos was put up for elimination after they were not chosen by neither canvas.; Best Tattoo of the Day: Unkindness Art; Face Off Tattoo: Black Cobra Tattoo, Empire State Studio, Golden Skull Tattoo and Old Town Ink must tag team their respective partner to tattoo the style and subject that were each chosen by the winners of the elimination tattoo. Basilica picked American Traditional while Unkindness Art wants them to incorporate the style into a snake because of the show featured several artists screwing up the design in the previous seasons.; Eliminated: Empire State Studio
122	14	"Casting the First Stone"	September 12, 2017	N/A
Skill of the Week: Cohesion; Flash Challenge: The shops had six hours to paint a nude human canvas onto a two dimensional canvas that looks seamless.; Winner: Golden Skull Tattoo; Elimination Tattoo: Final five shops deal with Asian deities in this tag team elimination tattoo.; Top Shops: Old Town Ink and Unkindness Art; Best Tattoo of the Day: Old Town Ink; Bottom: Golden Skull Tattoo, Balisica Tattoo and Black Cobra Tattoos; Eliminated: Golden Skull Tattoo
123	15	"Marathon to the Finale"	September 19, 2017	N/A
Tattoo Marathon - Round 1: The final four shops compete in a two-part tattoo marathon that will determine who goes to the live finale.; Best Tattoo of the Day: Black Cobra Tattoos and Basilica Tattoo; Tattoo Marathon - Round 2: Old Town Ink and Unkindness Art fight for the last remaining spot in the Ink Master Live Finale.; Best Tattoo of the Day: Old Town Ink; Eliminated: Unkindness Art
124	16	"Shop Wars Finale"	September 26, 2017	N/A
Finale - Round 1: Twitter users voted Black Cobra Tattoos into the final two, based on the live 6-hour tattoo. Judges voted Old Town Ink into the final two based on the 35-hour master canvas black-and-gray tattoo.; Finale - Round 2: Judges voted Old Town Ink as Master Shop based on the 35-hour master canvas color tattoo.
