= Ink Master season 8 =

Ink Master: Peck vs. Nuñez
- Season 8
- Hosted by: Dave Navarro
- Judges: Chris Núñez; Oliver Peck
- No. of contestants: 18
- Winner: Ryan Ashley
- No. of episodes: 16

Release
- Original network: Spike
- Original release: August 23 – December 6, 2016

Season chronology
- ← Previous; Revenge Next → Shop Wars

Ink Master: Peck vs Nuñez is the eighth season of the tattoo reality competition Ink Master that premiered on August 23 and concluded on December 6, 2016, on Spike with 16 episodes. The show is hosted and judged by Jane's Addiction guitarist Dave Navarro, with accomplished tattoo artists Chris Núñez and Oliver Peck serving as series regular judges. The winner will receive a $100,000 prize, a feature in Inked Magazine, a Dodge Charger, a guest spot at their respective team captain's shop (Oliver Peck's Elm Street Tattoo in Dallas, Texas or Chris Nuñez's Handcrafted in Ft. Lauderdale, Florida) and the title of Ink Master.

The premise of this season was Núñez and Peck going head-to-head for the first time in Ink Master history where thirty artists battled for a spot on either team, with both teams consisting of nine artists each. The first seven episodes featured each team battling their own members in an elimination-style competition for a spot in the top ten. Then, the top five artists on Team Núñez battled Team Peck's top five artists.

The winner of the eighth season of Ink Master was Ryan Ashley, who became the first female winner in the competition, with Gian Karle Cruz being the runner-up.

== Judging and ranking ==
=== Judging Panel ===
The judging panel is the table of three primary judges. They will vote to see who had the best tattoo of the day and who will be eliminated as well as choosing the winner of Ink Master.

=== Jury of Peers ===
The team that is safe from elimination will put one artist from the opposing team up for elimination. They will then explain to the judges why that artist was chosen. From the tenth episode onwards, all the artists will critique each other's work.

== Contestants ==
The first episode introduces 30 contestants who competed in a two-part elimination tattoo marathon with each part narrowing down to 26 and 22 artists respectively. Nuñez and Peck then picked the first five artists to be on their respective team. The remaining 12 artists competed again to earn a spot on Team Nuñez or Team Peck. The official 18 artists for this season were split into two teams of 9 artists.

Names, experience, and cities stated are at time of filming.

Contestant Name	Years of experience	Hometown	Outcome
Ryan Ashley	4	Kingston, Pennsylvania	Winner
Gian Karle Cruz	7	Puerto Rico	Runner-up
Kelly Doty	8	Salem, Massachusetts	3rd place
Nate Beavers	24	Houston, Texas	4th place
Nikki Simpson	5	Los Angeles, California	5th place
Kevin Laroy	10	Dallas, Texas	6th place
Anwon "Boneface" Johnson	17	Pensacola, Florida	7th place
Jason "Sketchylawyer" Lawyer	9	Senoia, Georgia	8th place (Note: Lawyer quit the competition.)
Eric Gonzalez	18	Lynwood, California	9th place
Mike McAskill	8	Riverside, California	10th place
Gia Rose	13	Philadelphia, Pennsylvania	11th place
“Tuff” Tito Velez	22	Belleair, Florida	12th place
Matt Murray	4	Beverly, Massachusetts	13th place
Sirvone Smith	6	Fredericksburg, Virginia	14th place
John Collins	14	Atlanta, Georgia	15th place
Dave Robinowitz	11	Boynton Beach, Florida	16th place
Geary Morrill †	17	Ferndale, Michigan	17th place
Carolyn Elaine	6	Chicago, Illinois	18th place

=== Chosen ===
Team Nuñez
John Collins
Kelly Doty
Carolyn Elaine
Eric Gonzalez
Kevin Laroy
Jason "Sketchylawyer" Lawyer
Nikki Simpson
Sirvone Smith
Tito “Tuff Tito” Velez

Team Peck
Gian Karle Cruz
Nate Beavers
Anwon "Boneface" Johnson
Ryan Ashley
Michael "Mike" McAskill
Geary Morrill
Matthew "Matt" Murray
David "Dave" Robinowitz
Gia Rose

=== Not chosen ===
Contestants
Brandon "Hobo Ink" Allen †
Raphael Barros
Chris Saint Clark
Cris Eck
Johnny Flash
Elisheba Israel
Chauncey "CK" Kochel
Brett Osborne
Marie Makowski
Danielle McKnight
Ryan Murray
Hillary "Princess Hilla" Santagata

† indicates that the artist has since died after filming ended.

== Contestant progress ==
Indicates the contestant was a part of Team Nuñez. Indicates the contestant was a part of Team Peck.

Contestant	Episode													
Contestant	2 (Note: Team Peck were exempt from elimination.)	3 (Note: Team Nuñez were exempt from elimination.)	4 (Note: Nate and Sirvone won their Head-to-Head Face-Off challenge against Dave and John respectively to determine who would stay in the competition.)	5	6	7	8	9	10	11	13 (Note: Ryan won her Head-to-Head challenge, but was in the bottom three.)	14 (Note: Kelly defeated Nikki in the Face-Off challenge to determine who would stay in the competition.)	15 (Note: Kelly won the first round, Ryan won the second round, and Gian won the final round in the Tattoo Marathon to advance to the finale.)	16
Ryan Ashley	SAFE	BTM3	HIGH	SAFE	WIN	SAFE	TOP2	WIN	WIN	SAFE	BTM3	WIN	ADV	Winner
Gian Karle	SAFE	WIN	HIGH	SAFE	TOP2	SAFE	WIN	SAFE	TOP3	TOP3	SAFE	WIN	ADV	Runner-up
Kelly Doty	WIN	SAFE	HIGH	TOP2	SAFE	WIN	SAFE	SAFE	BTM3	TOP3	TOP2	BTM2	ADV	Eliminated
Nate Beavers	SAFE	SAFE	BTM4	SAFE	SAFE	SAFE	BTM4	BTM3	HIGH	BTM3	WIN	WIN	ELIM	Guest
Nikki Simpson	TOP3	SAFE	HIGH	WIN	SAFE	BTM3	SAFE	HIGH	TOP3	WIN	BTM3	ELIM		Guest
Kevin LaRoy	BTM3	SAFE	LOW	BTM3	SAFE	BTM3	SAFE	SAFE	BTM3	BTM3	ELIM			Guest
Boneface	SAFE	HIGH	LOW	SAFE	BTM3	SAFE	BTM4	HIGH	SAFE	ELIM				Guest
Sketchylawyer	TOP3	SAFE	HIGH	SAFE	SAFE	SAFE	SAFE	BTM3	SAFE	QUIT				Guest
Eric Gonzalez	SAFE	SAFE	HIGH	HIGH	SAFE	TOP2	SAFE	TOP2	ELIM					Guest
Mike McAskill	SAFE	SAFE	SAFE	SAFE	SAFE	SAFE	BTM4	ELIM						Guest
Gia Rose	SAFE	BTM3	SAFE	SAFE	BTM3	SAFE	ELIM							Guest
Tuff Tito	BTM3	SAFE	LOW	BTM3	SAFE	ELIM								Guest
Matt Murray	SAFE	SAFE	LOW	SAFE	ELIM									Guest
Sirvone Smith	LOW	SAFE	BTM4	ELIM										Guest
John Collins	SAFE	SAFE	ELIM											Guest
Dave Robinowitz	SAFE	SAFE	ELIM											Guest
Geary Morrill	SAFE	ELIM												Guest
Carolyn Elaine	ELIM													Guest

The contestant won Ink Master.
The contestant was the runner-up.
The contestant was eliminated during the finale.
The contestant advanced to the finale
The contestant won Best Tattoo of the Day.
The contestant was among the top.
The contestant received positive critiques.
The contestant received negative critiques.
The contestant was in the bottom.
The contestant was put in the bottom by the Jury of Peers.
The contestant was eliminated from the competition.
The contestant was put in the bottom by the Jury of Peers and was eliminated from the competition.
The contestant quit the competition.
The contestant returned as a guest for that episode.

== Episodes ==
No. overall	No. in season	Title	Original release date	US viewers (millions)
93	1	"Weeding Out the Weak"	August 23, 2016	3.71
Tattoo Marathon - Day 1: 30 artists face a grueling two-day convention style elimination where they have to tattoo the style each captain is known for. However, not every artist will finish both marathons as one artist will be eliminated if they don't impress either Peck or Núñez. The first day has the artists tackling American traditional, a specialty Peck is known for.; Eliminated: Brett Osborne, Hobo Ink, Chris Saint Clark and Johnny Flash; Tattoo Marathon - Day 2: The 26 artists who survived the first day had five hours to tattoo Núñez's specialty which was Japanese. In addition they must also use a live Geisha model as their reference.; Eliminated: CK, Cris Eck, Ryan Murray and Marie Makowski; Team Picks - Part 1: The remaining 22 artists arrived at the loft where it became a heads or tails game between the two captains but Núñez ended up with the first pick after he picked tails. One by one, he and Peck went back and forth with their picks until it came down to vacant four spots on both teams. Núñez picked Eric Gonzalez, Nikki Simpson, Sketchylawyer, Kelly Doty and Kevin LaRoy while Peck's first picks consisted of Ryan Ashley, Mike McAskill, Gian Karle, Gia Rose and Nate Beavers.; Tattoo Marathon - Day 3: The last 12 artists have one more chance to impress Peck or Núñez while tattooing their own style and subject of their choice for six hours. Four artists will be eliminated if not chosen by either team. Elisheba's canvas refused to work with her. Therefore, she got a new canvas to work on.; Team Picks - Part 2: Peck received the first pick this time and his final picks were Geary Morrill, Dave Robinowitz, Matt Murray and Boneface. And rounding out Team Núñez is Tuff Tito, Sirvone Smith, John Collins and Carolyn Elaine.
94	2	"The Games Begin"	August 30, 2016	1.11
Skill of the Week: Composition; Flash Challenge: The teams have seven hours to work with three different canvases to create one interlocking back piece at the same time with Team Núñez working with three firefighters and Team Peck working with three police officers. An immunity will be rewarded to the team who wins this challenge.; Winner: Team Peck; Elimination Tattoo: Team Núñez must use composition when they are tasked to tattoo a Medusa for six hours. Carolyn was eliminated because the judges felt she had the worst tattoo of the day.; Best Tattoo of the Day: Kelly Doty; Bottom: Tuff Tito, Carolyn Elaine and Kevin LaRoy; Eliminated: Carolyn Elaine
95	3	"Ruffled Feathers"	September 6, 2016	1.10
Skill of the Week: Precision; Flash Challenge: The tables have turned this week when Dave announced that Team Peck will be put up for elimination. Each member of Team Núñez must consult with a member of Team Peck to help them create a "personal beach" sand sculpture while using Corona products. In addition, due to her win in the previous elimination tattoo, Kelly chose two artists to sculpt two beaches for her.; Winner: Dave Robinowitz; Elimination Tattoo: Dave R. used the skull pick strategy to throw his teammates under the bus as Team Peck gets to work on tattooing a peacock. Everyone except Gian and Boneface struggled with their tattoos. Mike had mixed reviews on his tattoo. Ryan and Gia who had the hardest canvases, lacked precision and having bad execution on their designs. However the judges eliminate Geary for not having a creative drawing and an unfinished design.; Winner: Gian Karle; Bottom: Geary Morrill, Ryan Ashley and Gia Rose; Eliminated: Geary Morrill
96	4	"Put Your Armor On"	September 13, 2016	1.04
Skill of the Week: Texture; Elimination Tattoo: A double elimination jeopardizes both teams where one member from each team will be eliminated. The teams must work in pairs of two to tattoo shoulder armor on both canvases' shoulders at the same time for six hours with Team Núñez tattooing metal armor and Team Peck tattooing leather armor. They will then be judged together. In addition, each captain decided on the pairs of their respective members.; Worst Tattoos of the Day: Nate Beavers & Dave Robinowitz and John Collins & Sirvone Smith; Face Off Tattoo: Team Núñez tasks Dave R. and Nate to tattoo a black and grey animal that shows realism while John and Sirvone were also tasked by Team Peck to tattoo the same style and subject as Dave and Nate. Both pairs had six hours to tattoo against their respective teammate.; Eliminated: Dave Robinowitz and John Collins
97	5	"Sparks Fly"	September 20, 2016	2.99
Skill of the Week: Legibility; Flash Challenge: Team Núñez had five hours to use electricity, consisting a 12 volt battery and electric wire, to create a style that was given to them by Team Peck. Team Peck tasked them to create an underwater marine life design.; Winner: Kevin LaRoy; Elimination Tattoo: Team Núñez had six hours to create a watercolor tattoo that shows legibility.; Best Tattoo of the Day: Nikki Simpson; Bottom: Sirvone Smith, Tuff Tito and Kevin LaRoy; Eliminated: Sirvone Smith
98	6	"Sticky Situation"	September 27, 2016	1.12
Skill of the Week: Contrast; Flash Challenge: Team Peck had five hours to create a high-contrast image on a plexiglass canvas, using only brown packaging tape. Team Núñez assigned them to create a face.; Winner: Gian Karle; Elimination Tattoo: Dave puts Team Peck to the test when they had six hours to tattoo an outer space tattoo that shows contrast. The judges eliminated Matt for lacking contrast in his tattoo.; Best Tattoo of the Day: Ryan Ashley; Bottom: Gia Rose, Boneface and Matt Murray; Eliminated: Matt Murray
99	7	"New School, Old Scars"	October 4, 2016	3.06
Skill of the Week: Artistry; Flash Challenge: Each member of Team Núñez worked with a former smoker that was assigned to them by Team Peck to cover up their scars.; Winner: Nikki Simpson; Elimination Tattoo: The artists on Team Núñez fight for a spot in the top five when they have six hours to turn a famous landmark into a new school tattoo. Donovan Smith was one of the canvases in this Elimination Tattoo.; Guest Canvas: Donovan Smith; Best Tattoo of the Day: Kelly Doty; Bottom: Tuff Tito, Kevin LaRoy and Nikki Simpson; Eliminated: Tuff Tito
100	8	"Bent Out of Shape"	October 11, 2016	1.18
Skill of the Week: Ingenuity; Flash Challenge: Using grinders and welders, Team Peck manipulated metal rods into a dynamic sculpture out of lines. In addition, Team Núñez assigned the pairs.; Winner: Ryan Ashley & Gia Rose; Elimination Tattoo: A spot in the top 5 is on the line when Team Peck had six hours to turn a canvases' significant other into a pinup. In the end the judges eliminated Gia because of her bad report card on previous tattoos and having another bad tattoo.; Best Tattoo of the Day: Gian Karle; Bottom: Mike McAskill, Nate Beavers, Boneface and Gia Rose; Eliminated: Gia Rose
101	9	"Head Games"	October 18, 2016	3.23
Skill of the Week: Adaptability; Elimination Tattoo - Day 1: Both teams faced their biggest task of doing of 12-hr tattoo on the head with each day consisting six hours. The first day has them tattooing the left lobe while the second day has them tattooing the right lobe.; Elimination tattoo - Day 2: One artist will pick a skull that has a number on the bottom that determined the order of which artist goes first. Each artist will pick the opposing artist's canvas they want to tattoo. Kevin got a new canvas after his canvas, who was previously tattooed by Kelly, withdrew from the elimination tattoo. Each pair were judged head to head on which head they tattooed.; Best Tattoo of the Day: Ryan Ashley; Bottom: Mike McAskill, Nate Beavers and Sketchylawyer; Eliminated: Mike McAskill
102	10	"Like Sand Through the Hour Glass"	October 25, 2016	3.30
Skill of the Week: Detail; Flash Challenge: Both teams had six hours to create powerful designs on a Dodge Charger with thousands of sharpies.; Winner: Team Peck; Elimination Tattoo: Team Peck and Team Núñez had six hours to show detail when they are tasked to tattoo an hourglass.; Guest Judge: Von Miller; Best Tattoo of the Day: Ryan Ashley; Bottom: Eric Gonzalez, Kevin LaRoy and Kelly Doty; Eliminated: Eric Gonzalez
103	11	"Duck and Cover Up"	November 1, 2016	1.17
Skill of the Week: Technical Application; Flash Challenge: The teams must show flawless technical application by tattooing the palm of the hand.; Winner: Nikki Simpson; Withdrawal: Before Dave announced the guest judge for the Elimination Tattoo, Sketchylawyer, still feeling the burn from being criticized in the Flash Challenge, walked out. Dave and Núñez tried to convince him to stay but to no avail.; Elimination Tattoo: The artists had six hours to cover up a canvas's tramp stamp; Guest Judge: Robert Atkinson; Best Tattoo of the Day: Nikki Simpson; Bottom: Boneface, Kevin LaRoy and Nate Beavers; Eliminated: Boneface
104	12	"Road to the Finale"	November 8, 2016	0.62
Dave interviews the final six artists featuring never before seen footage. Each contestant has their own view on the competition and openly expresses it.
105	13	"Heavy Lifting"	November 15, 2016	1.07
Skill of the Week: Accuracy; Guest Judge: Tim Hendricks; Flash Challenge: Each pair had six hours to create a larger image out of colored bricks without misplacing one.; Winner: Nate & Kevin; Elimination Tattoo: Each pair faced off in a head to head battle when they tattooed the same toddler portrait tattoos. Kelly, Nate and Ryan won their head to head battle against Nikki, Gian and Kevin respectively.; Best Tattoo of the Day: Nate Beavers; Bottom: Kevin LaRoy, Nikki Simpson and Ryan Ashley; Eliminated: Kevin LaRoy
106	14	"Biomechanical Failure"	November 22, 2016	1.05
Skill of the Week: Consistency; Guest Judge: Chris Garver; Elimination Tattoo: The teams tattooed their canvas at the same time for six hours by turning them into a cyborg. In addition, the artist must pick up where their teammate left after each hour passes by. Team Peck received the canvas pick first after Nate picked up the skull that has the x mark on the bottom. Because Team Núñez didn't incorporate the subject into their tattoo after Kelly and Nikki didn't listen to Núñez's advice, the judges made unanimous decision.; Best Tattoo of the Day: Team Peck; Face Off Tattoo: Núñez was torn that he had to watch the last two members of his team fight for a spot in the top four as Team Peck tasks Nikki and Kelly to tattoo a Gypsy woman for four hours. Both Nikki and Kelly receive great praise in their tattoos. In an emotional elimination the judges eliminated Nikki but Núñez praises her for being a great artist despite having less experience.; Eliminated: Nikki Simpson
107	15	"No One is Safe"	November 29, 2016	1.10
Tattoo Marathon - Round 1: The final four artists must survive a 15-hour tattoo marathon with each day consisting of five hours. They must tattoo a style each team did not do when they acted as the Jury of Peers but were previously critiqued by the judges. The artist who wins best tattoo of the day for each day will earn a spot in the live finale while the other artists continue tattooing. The first five hours featured Team Peck tattooing a Medusa while Kelly tattooed a peacock.; Best Tattoo of the Day: Kelly Doty; Tattoo Marathon - Round 2: Team Peck tattooed a watercolor design.; Best Tattoo of the Day: Ryan Ashley; Tattoo Marathon - Round 3: For the final hour, Nate and Gian tattooed a New School landmark.; Best Tattoo of the Day: Gian Karle; Eliminated: Nate Beavers
108	16	"Peck vs. Nuñez Live"	December 6, 2016	4.06
Dave welcomes the audience to the live finale while performing a body suspension stunt.: Finale Tattoo: Ryan, Kelly, and Gian had 24 hours to tattoo a chest piece in the style each team was given to them by the opposing team. Team Peck assigned Kelly with an American Traditional that showcases a ship, anchors and mermaids. Kelly challenges Ryan to design two huge 90s-inspired New School dueling hot rods with big outlines, despite their alliance throughout the competition, while Gian was given a watercolor coral reef. However, only the top two artists will get to show their master canvas.; Live Tattoo: The final three then had seven hours to tattoo a style each artist was assigned to by the viewers. The audience will also get to tune into their progress online. Kelly worked on a New School tattoo while Gian designed a Japanese tattoo. Ryan finally gets to tattoo the style she is known for which was a black and grey tattoo with fine line. Two artists will advance to the top two with one artist picked by the judges and the other who receives the most votes by Twitter users.; America's Pick: Ryan Ashley; Judge's Pick: Gian Karle; 3rd Place: Kelly Doty; Winner: Ryan Ashley
