= Ink Master season 7 =

Ink Master: Revenge
- Season 7
- Hosted by: Dave Navarro
- Judges: Chris Núñez; Oliver Peck
- No. of contestants: 16
- Winner: Anthony Michaels
- No. of episodes: 13

Release
- Original network: Spike
- Original release: March 1 – May 24, 2016

Season chronology
- ← Previous; Master vs. Apprentice Next → Peck vs Nuñez

Ink Master: Revenge is the seventh season of the tattoo reality competition Ink Master that aired on Spike on March 1 and concluded on May 24, 2016 with a total of 13 episodes. The show is hosted and judged by Jane's Addiction guitarist Dave Navarro, with accomplished tattoo artists Chris Núñez and Oliver Peck serving as series regular judges. The winner will receive a $100,000 prize, a feature in Inked Magazine and the title of Ink Master.

The premise of this season was featuring eight contestants competing against eight returning veterans in an elimination-style competition.

This season saw the return of eight veterans; season 1 contestant James Vaughn, season 2 contestants Sarah Miller and Jesse Smith, season 3 contestant Jime Litwalk, season 4 contestants Walter "Sausage" Frank and Matti Hixson, season 5 contestant James "Cleen Rock One" Steinke, and season 6 contestant Mark S. "St. MarQ" Agee.

The winner of the seventh season of Ink Master was Anthony Michaels, with James "Cleen Rock One" Steinke being the runner-up.

== Judging and ranking ==
=== Judging Panel ===
The judging panel is responsible for passing judgement on each artist. They collaborate and use information from their own perception, the audience vote, human canvas vote, and the winner's worst vote to determine who should be sent home. Weight of decisions is set by the terms of the challenge skill.

=== Human Canvas Jury ===
After the tattoos are completed, the canvases for the challenge gather and vote on the best and worst of that day's tattoos. While the primary judges have the final say, the weight of the canvas vote does affect the judging panels final decision.

== Contestants ==
Names, experience, and cities stated are at time of filming.

Contestant Name	Years of experience	Hometown	Outcome
Anthony Michaels	5	Tucson, Arizona	Winner
James "Cleen Rock One" Steinke	20	Las Vegas, Nevada	Runner-up
Christian Buckingham	13	Henderson, Nevada	3rd place
James Vaughn	26	Asheboro, North Carolina	4th place
Matti Hixson	11	Virginia Beach, Virginia	5th place
Jesse Smith	18	Richmond, Virginia	6th place
Walter "Sausage" Frank	14	Las Vegas, Nevada	7th place
Jime Litwalk	22	Orlando, Florida	8th place
Megan Jean Morris	7	Wallingford, Connecticut	9th place
Sarah Miller	10	Pittsburgh, Pennsylvania	10th place
Alex Rockoff	9	West Palm Beach, Florida	11th place
Mark S. "St. MarQ" Agee	26	West Lafayette, Indiana	12th place
Picasso Dular	16	Los Angeles, California	13th place
Ashley Velazquez	5	New Haven, Connecticut	14th place
Cris Gherman	15	New York, New York	15th place
Corey Davis	10	Atlanta, Georgia	16th place

=== Returning veterans ===
Contestants	Original Season	Original Placement
Mark S. "St. MarQ" Agee	Season 6	12th place
Walter "Sausage" Frank	Season 4	Runner-up
Matti Hixson	Season 4	3rd place
Jime Litwalk	Season 3	Runner-up
Sarah Miller	Season 2	Runner-up
Jesse Smith	Season 2	5th place
James "Cleen Rock One" Steinke	Season 5	Runner-up
James Vaughn	Season 1	3rd place

== Contestant progress ==
Indicates the contestant was a Newcomer. Indicates the contestant was a Veteran.

Contestant	Episode												
Contestant	1	2	3	4	5	6	7	8	9 (Note: Cleen and Matti were originally deemed as safe, but Jime and Sausage challenged them in the Face-Off challenge to determine who would stay in the competition.)	10 (Note: Anthony defeated Jesse in the Face-Off challenge to determine who would stay in the competition.)	11	12 (Note: Anthony and Christian won their Head-to-Head Face-Off challenge against Cleen and James to determine who would advance to the finale, and then Cleen won his Face-Off challenge against James.)	13
Anthony Michaels	HIGH	TOP3	WIN	BTM4	HIGH	HIGH	HIGH	TOP3	HIGH	BTM2	WIN	ADV	Winner
Cleen Rock One		WIN	BTM3	WIN	TOP2	BTM4	BTM3	WIN	SAFE	SAFE	BTM3	ADV	Runner-up
Christian Buckingham	TOP2	TOP3	SAFE	HIGH	SAFE	LOW	WIN	SAFE	TOP3	SAFE	BTM3	ADV	Eliminated
James Vaughn								TOP3	WIN	SAFE	TOP2	ELIM	Guest
Matti Hixson				SAFE	LOW	SAFE	SAFE	BTM4	SAFE	SAFE	ELIM		Guest
Jesse Smith							TOP3	SAFE	TOP3	ELIM			Guest
Sausage			TOP4	SAFE	WIN	SAFE	TOP3	BTM4	ELIM				Guest
Jime Litwalk					SAFE	BTM4	BTM3	BTM4	ELIM				Guest
Megan Jean Morris	WIN	SAFE	LOW	BTM4	BTM3	WIN	SAFE	ELIM					Guest
Sarah Miller						BTM4	ELIM						Guest
Alex Rockoff	SAFE	BTM3	TOP4	BTM4	BTM3	ELIM							Guest
St. MarQ	BTM3	HIGH	TOP4	LOW	ELIM								Guest
Picasso Dular	SAFE	SAFE	BTM3	ELIM									Guest
Ashley Velazquez	BTM3	BTM3	ELIM										Guest
Cris Gherman	SAFE	ELIM											Guest
Corey Davis	ELIM												Guest

The contestant won Ink Master.
The contestant was the runner-up.
The contestant was eliminated during the finale.
The contestant advanced to the finale.
The contestant won Best Tattoo of the Day.
The contestant was among the top.
The contestant received positive critiques.
The contestant received negative critiques.
The contestant was in the bottom.
The contestant was in the bottom and voted Worst Tattoo of the Day by the Human Canvas Jury.
The contestant was eliminated from the competition.
The contestant was voted Worst Tattoo of the Day and was eliminated from the competition.
The contestant returned as a guest for that episode.

== Episodes ==
No. overall	No. in season	Title	Original release date	US viewers (millions)
80	1	"Initiation"	March 1, 2016	3.35
Skill of the Week: Fundamentals; The Flash Challenge: Eight rookie artists squared off in a three-part challenge. They were given four hours to first do a full-body sketch of a nude model, assemble both a liner and shader machine from Seth Cifferi, and then tattoo the drawing they did earlier with the machines they built on a dead pig.; Winner: Christian Buckingham; Returning Veteran: St. MarQ; Elimination Tattoo: The rookies were surprised to learn from the judges that they will be faced with a new returning artist from a previous Ink Master season each week, and that the returning artist each week is given the opportunity to choose the elimination tattoo. St. MarQ challenges the artists to tattoo one of the seven deadly sins in black and grey, using only shading needles.; Top Artists: Megan Jean Morris and Christian Buckingham; Best Tattoo of the Day: Megan Jean Morris; Bottom: Corey Davis, Ashley Velazquez and St. MarQ; Eliminated: Corey Davis
81	2	"One Man's Trash"	March 8, 2016	3.17
Skill of the Week: Contrast; Flash Challenge: The artists work in teams of two to make a sculpture out of recyclable trash. Then, they must use a beamlight on their sculpture to create a shadow that has contrast.; Winner: Ashley Velazquez & Alex Rockoff; Returning Veteran: Cleen Rock One; Elimination Tattoo: The artists take Cleen's style by tattooing neo-traditional hot rods and choppers.; Best Tattoo of the Day: Cleen Rock One; Human Canvas Jury: Cris Gherman, Alex Rockoff and Ashley Velazquez; Eliminated: Cris Gherman
82	3	"Salt in the Wound"	March 16, 2016	2.89
Skill of the Week: Creativity; Flash Challenge: Working in teams of two, the artists use salt to create their masterpiece.; Winner: Christian Buckingham & Megan Jean Morris; Returning Veteran: Sausage; Elimination Tattoo: The artists must use the canvas's likeness in a comic book themed tattoo.; Top Artists: Sausage and Anthony Michaels; Best Tattoo of the Day: Anthony Michaels; Bottom: Cleen Rock One, Picasso Dular and Ashley Velazquez: Eliminated: Ashley Velazquez
83	4	"The Devil's in the Details"	March 22, 2016	3.01
Skill of the Week: Detail; Flash Challenge: Tattooing a fingerprint of the canvas's loved one, scanned by Adrian Gardner.; Winner: Cleen Rock One; Returning Veteran: Matti Hixson; Elimination Tattoo: The artists must tattoo a Venetian mask, focusing on detail.; Best Tattoo of the Day: Cleen Rock One; Bottom: Picasso Dular, Alex Rockoff, Anthony Michaels and Megan Jean Morris; Eliminated: Picasso Dular
84	5	"New School, Old Artist"	March 29, 2016	2.66
Skill of the Week: Color Theory; Flash Challenge: The artists head to Coney Island Freak Show where they must work in teams of two to airbrush a pair of contortionists and create a mind blowing illusion.; Winner: Megan Jean Morris & Sausage; Returning Veteran: Jime Litwalk; Elimination Tattoo: The artists tackle Jime's specialty by tattooing a New School dinosaur.; Top Artists: Sausage and Cleen Rock One; Best Tattoo of the Day: Sausage; Bottom: Megan Jean Morris, Alex Rockoff and St. MarQ; Eliminated: St. MarQ
85	6	"Under Pressure"	April 5, 2016	2.59
Skill of the Week: Composition: Flash Challenge: A pair of artists create a dynamic composition on a dirty semi truck using a power washer.; Winner: Anthony Michaels & Matti Hixson; Returning Veteran: Sarah Miller; Elimination Tattoo: An interesting elimination tattoo has the artists tattooing a surrealistic female but Sarah's strategy backfired.; Best Tattoo of the Day: Megan Jean Morris; Bottom: Jime Litwalk, Sarah Miller, Alex Rockoff and Cleen Rock One; Eliminated: Alex Rockoff
86	7	"Knuckle Sandwich"	April 12, 2016	2.82
Skill of the Week: Precision; Flash Challenge: The artists design custom lettering on the knuckles, without using references.; Winner: Cleen Rock One; Returning Veteran: Jesse Smith; Elimination Tattoo: The remaining artists must be on their A game when they have to tattoo a black & grey portrait of a political figure. Jesse redeemed himself from his elimination in Season 2.; Top Artists: Sausage and Christian Buckingham; Best Tattoo of the Day: Christian Buckingham; Bottom: Cleen Rock One, Jime Litwalk and Sarah Miller; Eliminated: Sarah Miller
87	8	"Breathing Fire"	April 19, 2016	3.00
Skill of the Week: Legibility; Flash Challenge: The artists work in teams of two to make a large-scale legible design out of pushpins.; Winner: Cleen Rock One & Christian Buckingham; Returning Veteran: James Vaughn; Elimination Tattoo: The artists aim to create a Japanese dragon with water.; Top Artists: James Vaughn, Cleen Rock One and Anthony Michaels; Best Tattoo of the Day: Cleen Rock One; Bottom: Jime Litwalk, Sausage, Matti Hixon and Megan Jean Morris; Eliminated: Megan Jean Morris
88	9	"Sink or Soar"	April 26, 2016	3.04
Skill of the Week: Texture; Elimination Tattoo: The artists work in teams of two to tattoo a full set of wings on the canvas's back at the same time, with one artist working on a "good" wing and the other tattooing an "evil" wing.; Top Artists: James Vaughn and Christian Buckingham; Best Tattoo of the Day: James Vaughn; Bottom: Jime Litwalk and Sausage; Face Off Tattoo: Jime and Sausage were given one last chance to redeem themselves as Dave asked them each to pick an artist to face for a head-to-head elimination tattoo. The chosen artist picked the style and subject for their face-off. Sausage picked Matti and Jime picked Cleen.; Eliminated: Jime Litwalk and Sausage
89	10	"Shipwrecked"	May 3, 2016	2.78
Skill of the Week: Adaptability; Elimination Tattoo: The artists work in teams of three to tattoo American traditional clipper ship with one member from each team working on line work, shading or color. The teams must then decide on the weakest member who will then be put up for elimination.; Face-Off Tattoo: Anthony and Jesse have six hours to adaptability to tattoo their own subject and style from scratch without any references.; Eliminated: Jesse Smith
90	11	"Head in the Game"	May 10, 2016	2.81
Skill of the Week: Ingenuity; Flash Challenge: The final five created a design on the canvas's foreheads.; Winner: James Vaughn; Elimination Tattoo: The artists must use ingenuity to cover up the canvas' despised tattoo.; Top Artists: Anthony Michaels and James Vaughn; Best Tattoo of the Day: Anthony Michaels; Bottom: Cleen Rock One, Matti Hixson and Christian Buckingham; Eliminated: Matti Hixson
91	12	"Turning the Tables"	May 17, 2016	3.30
Elimination Tattoo: The rookies finally get their revenge by picking the veteran artist they want to face in addition to picking the style and subject. Anthony picked Cleen in the battle to tattoo a realistic black and grey woman they drew while Christian and James duke it out in the realistic full bodied black and grey wolf tattoo. Their strategy gave them a huge advantage to the live finale.; Face-Off Tattoo: Cleen and James had one last chance to earn a spot in the finale with them calling their own shots this time. While James picked a Japanese fu dog on a peony, Cleen settled in on New School with a snake wrapping a skull on top of a dagger.; Eliminated: James Vaughn; Finale Tattoo - Part 1: The final three artists are tasked to do 48 hours of tattooing where they have to tattoo each canvas for 24 hours. In the first part, the judges chose the style for each artist they struggled tattooing during the competition. They then must tattoo their assigned style to the chest with Anthony doing Japanese full color, Christian doing American Traditional and Cleen working on fine line black and grey.; Finale Tattoo - Part 2: Dave gave the artists good news where they have to tattoo a sleeve in the style of their choice. The judges and the viewers will choose which one artist to advance to the final two along with the second artist chosen by the jury of eliminated artists while the artist who didn't advance to the final will join the jury.
92	13	"Revenge Live"	May 24, 2016	3.57
Each artist did their tattoos in their hometown before returning to New York to present their final work. The winner of the chest piece tattoo that was voted by the fans will receive $20,000 from Gildan USA.: Tattoo Rematch: Matti and Sausage square off with the winner, who was chosen by the loudest reaction from the audience, tattooing their winning design on the artist who loses this rematch.; Winner: Sausage; Tattoo: A sausage with the sentence "#TeamSausage" inside.; Advanced: Anthony Michaels; Jury's Choice: Cleen Rock One; Winner: Anthony Michaels
