= Ink Master season 6 =

Ink Master: Master vs. Apprentice
- Season 6
- Hosted by: Dave Navarro
- Judges: Chris Núñez; Oliver Peck
- No. of contestants: 18
- Winner: Dave Kruseman
- No. of episodes: 16

Release
- Original network: Spike
- Original release: June 23 – October 13, 2015

Season chronology
- ← Previous; Rivals Next → Revenge

Ink Master: Master vs. Apprentice is the sixth season of the tattoo reality competition series Ink Master that premiered on Spike on June 23 and concluded on October 13, 2015 with a total of 16 episodes. The show is hosted and judged by Jane's Addiction guitarist Dave Navarro, with accomplished tattoo artists Chris Núñez and Oliver Peck serving as series regular judges. The winner will receive a $100,000 prize, a feature in Inked Magazine, a Dodge Challenger and the title of Ink Master.

The premise of this season was featuring mentors and their apprentices as they compete against each other in an elimination-style competition.

This season saw the return of season 3 contestant Craig Foster, who originally finished the competition in 8th place.

The winner of the sixth season of Ink Master was Dave Kruseman, with Chris Blinston being the runner-up.

== Judging and ranking ==
=== Judging Panel ===
The judging panel is responsible for passing judgement on each artist. They collaborate and use information from their own perception, the audience vote, human canvas vote, and the winner's worst vote to determine who should be sent home. Weight of decisions is set by the terms of the challenge skill.

=== Audience Voting ===
Audience voting is done through Facebook and Twitter, and was introduced in season 2. The audience vote was used in the finale episode to guarantee one of the finalists a spot in the top two.

=== Human Canvas Jury ===
After the tattoos are completed, the canvases for the challenge gather and vote on the best and worst of that day's tattoos. While the primary judges have the final say, the weight of the canvas vote does affect the judging panels final decision.

=== Jury of Peers ===
In episode two, the eight winners of the Head-to-Head challenge had to form a Jury of Peers to pick two artists to put up for elimination. These artists (including one artist picked from the Human Canvas Jury) had to participate in a Face-Off challenge to determine who would stay in the competition.

== Contestants ==
Names, experience, and cities stated are at time of filming.

Contestant Name	Years of experience	Hometown	Outcome
Dave Kruseman	20	Hagerstown, Maryland	**Winner**
Chris Blinston	18	Coral Springs, Florida	Runner-up
Matt O'Baugh	14	Sherwood, Arkansas	3rd place
Craig Foster	20	Carrollton, Georgia	4th place
Duffy Fortner	12	Prince Frederick, Maryland	5th place
Tyler Nolan	10	Ft. Lauderdale, Florida	6th place
Erik Campbell	13	Grand Junction, Colorado	7th place
Katie McGowan	5	Sherwood, Arkansas	8th place
Dave Clarke	11	Fort Walton Beach, Florida	9th place
Marisa LaRen	3	Ft. Lauderdale, Florida	10th place
Cesar "Big Ceeze" Castaneda	17	Anaheim, California	11th place
Mark S. "St. MarQ" Agee	25	West Lafayette, Indiana	12th place
Kito Talbert	10	Tulsa, Oklahoma	13th place
Earl Noble	10	St. Petersburg, Florida	14th place
Mat "MV" Valles	6	El Paso, Texas	15th place
Miami Burgess	23	Carrollton, Georgia	16th place
Ryan Hadley †	15	Fort Wayne, Indiana	17th place
Brian Stephens	3	El Paso, Texas	18th place

†: Indicates that the artist has since died after filming

=== Master and Apprentices ===
Master.	Apprentice
**Mark S. "St. MarQ" Agee**	Ryan Hadley
**Chris Blinston**	Tyler Nolan
Miami Burgess	**Craig Foster**
**Erik Campbell**	Marisa LaRen
**Cesar "Big Ceeze" Castaneda**	Kito Talbert
**Dave Kruseman**	Duffy Fortner
Earl Noble	**Dave Clarke**
**Matt O'Baugh**	Katie McGowan
**Mat "MV" Valles**	Brian Stephens

The name in BOLD is the person who went further in the competition.

== Contestant progress ==
Indicates the contestant was a Master. Indicates the contestant was an Apprentice.

Contestant	Episode															
Contestant	1	2 (Note: Earl and Kito defeated Ryan in the Face-Off challenge to determine who would stay in the competition.)	3	4	5	6	7 (Note: Chris defeated St. Marq in the Face-Off challenge to determine who would stay in the competition.)	8	9	10	11	12	13 (Note: None of the contestants impressed the judges enough for them to determine a winner.)	14	15	16
Kruseman	WIN	WIN	WIN	SAFE	BTM4	TOP3	WIN	SAFE	SAFE	SAFE	BTM3	HIGH	BTM4	BTM2	WIN	Winner
Chris Blinston	BTM4	WIN	WIN	WIN	WIN	SAFE	BTM2	SAFE	WIN	WIN	WIN	BTM3	HIGH	WIN	ADV	Runner-up
Matt O'Baugh	SAFE	WIN	WIN	WIN	SAFE	WIN	SAFE	HIGH	BTM5	WIN	BTM3	BTM3	SAFE	TOP2	WIN	Eliminated
Craig Foster	WIN	WIN	WIN	SAFE	WIN	SAFE	WIN	WIN	BTM5	SAFE	SAFE	HIGH	BTM4	SAFE	ELIM	Guest
Duffy Fortner	BTM4	SAFE	SAFE	SAFE	WIN	SAFE	SAFE	BTM4	BTM5	BTM3	WIN	WIN	BTM4	ELIM		Guest
Tyler Nolan	WIN	SAFE	SAFE	WIN	WIN	SAFE	SAFE	BTM4	BTM5	SAFE	WIN	HIGH	ELIM			Guest
Erik Campbell	WIN	WIN	WIN	WIN	BTM4	TOP3	WIN	TOP2	TOP2	BTM3	SAFE	ELIM				Guest
Katie McGowan	WIN	SAFE	WIN	SAFE	BTM4	SAFE	SAFE	SAFE	SAFE	WIN	ELIM					Guest
Dave Clarke	WIN	WIN	SAFE	SAFE	WIN	BTM4	SAFE	SAFE	HIGH	ELIM						Guest
Marisa LaRen	SAFE	SAFE	SAFE	BTM3	WIN	BTM4	WIN	BTM4	ELIM							Guest
Big Ceeze	WIN	WIN	BTM3	WIN	WIN	BTM4	SAFE	ELIM								Guest
St. MarQ	WIN	WIN	WIN	SAFE	SAFE	SAFE	ELIM									Guest
Kito Talbert	SAFE	BTM3	BTM3	BTM3	SAFE	ELIM										Guest
Earl Noble	SAFE	BTM3	WIN	SAFE	ELIM											Guest
MV	WIN	LOW	SAFE	ELIM												Guest
Miami Burgess	SAFE	SAFE	ELIM													Guest
Ryan Hadley	BTM4	ELIM														Guest
Brian Stephens	ELIM															Guest

The contestant won Ink Master.
The contestant was the runner-up.
The contestant was eliminated during the finale.
The contestant advanced to the finale.
The contestant won Best Tattoo of the Day.
The contestant won the Tattoo Marathon.
The contestant won their Head-to-Head challenge.
The contestant was among the top.
The contestant received positive critiques.
The contestant received negative critiques.
The contestant was in the bottom.
The contestant was in the bottom and voted Worst Tattoo of the Day by the Human Canvas Jury.
The contestant was eliminated from the competition.
The contestant was voted Worst Tattoo of the Day and was eliminated from the competition.
The contestant returned as a guest for that episode.

== Episodes ==
No. overall	No. in season	Title	Original release date	US viewers (millions)
64	1	"Meet Your Maker"	June 23, 2015	3.24
Skill of the Week: Overall Ability; Head to Head Challenge: The master and its respective apprentice square off in their first head to head challenge where both of them have five hours to tattoo the same style and same subject of their choice. The judges did a blind critique of both tattoos from the master and apprentice without knowing which artist tattooed which tattoo. Craig, Big Ceeze, Katie, Dave, Tyler, St. Marq, Erik, Kruseman and MV each won their respective head to head battle.; Elimination Tattoo: The losing artists are tasked to tattoo whatever the canvas wants. All the human canvases have previously been tattooed on the show. Kito's canvas left after disliking like the design, therefore he ended up tattooing himself. Melissa Monroe's canvas from the seventh episode of season 4 loved her tattoo, but the jury hated it and couldn't stand her arrogance, leading to Duffy being voted worst tattoo of the day despite receiving praise from the judges. Brian is eliminated for not capturing the face of his canvas tattoo.; Bottom: Ryan Hadley, Brian Stephens, Chris Blinston and Duffy Fortner; Eliminated: Brian Stephens
65	2	"Fight or Flight"	June 30, 2015	2.75
Skill of the Week: Legibility; Elimination Tattoo: The master and their apprentice have another head to head competition where they have to tattoo American traditional with the same subject. In addition, the human canvases are paired based on what tattoo they want and as a pair they will pick a skull with the master and apprentice's name on the bottom. The winners of last week's head to head also have an advantage in choosing which canvas they want to tattoo out of the pair. MV was assigned an open canvas despite his apprentice's elimination and decided to face Matt and Katie. Matt, Craig, Chris, Erik, Kruseman, St. Marq, Big Ceeze and Dave won their head to head challenge. They also formed the jury of peers following the critique, and chose Ryan and Earl as their weakest artists. This was the first time that there is a jury of peers. The human canvas jury also voted Kito to the bottom for worst tattoo of the day.; Face Off Tattoo: Earl, Ryan and Kito, who was voted worst tattoo of the day, had four hours to tattoo an American traditional eagle that was designed by Richard Stell. The judges were impressed with the three tattoos but picked Earl as their favorite and eliminated Ryan because he couldn't handle the pressure from them and the contestants.; Eliminated: Ryan Hadley
66	3	"Sink or Swim"	July 7, 2015	2.90
Skill of the Week: Contrast; Flash Challenge: The artists head to the American Museum of Natural History for their first flash challenge where they will work in teams of two to tattoo a kraken in battle on both canvas' hands at the same time with the kraken in black and grey on one hand and the enemy in any color on the other hand. In addition to assigning all the human canvases in the elimination tattoo, the winning team will also be rewarded a trip to a tattoo convention in Las Vegas provided by Kraken Rum. Each artist will pick a skull with a number on the bottom that will determine the team.; Winners: Chris Blinston and Erik Campbell; Elimination Tattoo: In their third head to head challenge, the artists had six hours to create a stained glass tattoo. Craig, Katie, Erik, Matt, Chris, Earl, St. Marq and Kruseman won their head to challenge. Miami is eliminated for having saturation issues on his tattoo as well as not including a stained glass design.; Bottom: Kito Talbert, Big Ceeze and Miami Burgess; Eliminated: Miami Burgess
67	4	"Tut for Tat"	July 14, 2015	2.96
Skill of the Week: Detail; Flash Challenge: The remaining artists meet up with Dave and the judges at the Brooklyn Museum. By working in teams of three, they have to use paint and gold leaf to design a sarcophagus.; Guest Judge: Avan Jogia; Winners: Duffy Fortner, Erik Campbell and St. Marq; Elimination Tattoo: Following a sneak peek of Tut, the fourth head to head features the artists creating Egyptian tattoos against two people with the same subject. Big Ceeze, Erik, Tyler, Matt and Chris won their head to head challenge. MV is eliminated because the judges could not tell what his tattoo was.; Bottom: MV, Marissa LaRen and Kito Talbert; Eliminated: MV
68	5	"Problem Parts"	July 28, 2015	2.68
Skill of the Week: Ingenuity; Flash Challenge: Working in teams of two, the artists have four hours to make a human form disappear by painting their nude canvas with black, white and UV color paint. They will also receive a small black light to illuminate the area they're working on before their final result at the end of the challenge. Winners: Craig Foster and Big Ceeze; Elimination Tattoo: The next head to head challenge features the artists creating illusions on body parts that are difficult to tattoo. Chris's canvas passed out prior to the challenge and was given extra time to tattoo a new canvas but had to design a new tattoo after the new canvas didn't want the tattoo that was originally given to the original canvas. Craig, Chris, Dave, Tyler, Big Ceeze, Marisa and Duffy won their head to head challenge. Earl was eliminated for having technical flaws in his design.; Bottom: Kruseman, Earl Noble, Erik Campbell and Katie Mcgowan; Eliminated: Earl Noble
69	6	"Firing Lines"	August 4, 2015	2.44
Skill of the Week: Line; Flash Challenge: The artists must use linework to engrave a Dogū.; Winner: Chris Blinston; Elimination Tattoo: The artists battle Mike Rubendall in their sixth head to head challenge where they have six hours to tattoo a koi fish. Rubendall will also tattoo at the same time. Each artist received the same koi fish he drew for them to design their own tattoo. The judges directly compared each artist's koi fish to Rubendall's. Most of the artists struggled with the challenge but Erik, Matt and Kruseman managed to pull it off. In the end Kito was unanimously eliminated due to having the worst tattoo of the day as well as letting his canvas take control of his design.; Best Tattoo of the Day: Matt O'Baugh; Bottom: Dave Clarke, Marissa LaRen, Kito Talbert and Big Ceeze.; Eliminated: Kito Talbert
70	7	"Predator/Prey"	August 11, 2015	2.36
Skill of the Week: Texture; Elimination Tattoo: Working in teams of four, the artists have six hours to transform a canvas into an animal at the same time by turning their skin into animal skin. The canvases will pick four skulls with the artists' name that will determine the team. The canvas, who wanted cheetah skin, suffers a panic attack near the end of the elimination tattoo and decided not to continue. Tyler, Matt, Duffy and St. Marq's Brazilian rainbow boa received a mixed response despite Tyler's knowledge. Craig, Erik, Kruseman and Marissa worked together on their crocodile skin and they were praised for their placement and the execution. Next, the judges critique Chris, Katie, Big Ceeze and Dave's cheetah skin despite their canvas' withdrawal but gave them mixed reviews because the tattoo is unfinished. And being a snake expert, Tyler argues with the judges after his team didn't execute the challenge. The losing teams determine which members on the team is the weakest. Chris and St. Marq were voted by their teammates despite the fact that they voted for themselves. Both Chris and St Marq impressed the judges but picked Chris as the winner.; Best Tattoo of the Day: Craig Foster, Erik Campbell, Kruseman and Marisa LaRen; Face Off Tattoo: Chris and St. Marq must tattoo an anatomical heart that was designed by the winning team.; Eliminated: St. Marq
71	8	"Composed and Exposed"	August 15, 2015	2.70
Skill of the Week: Composition; Flash Challenge: After meeting with the judges at the US Custom House, the artists have four hours to tattoo a postcard on the canvas' body. Matt wins and guns for Chris and his alliance after learning that he is a threat and a manipulator.; Winner: Matt O'Baugh; Elimination Tattoo: The artists tattoo a style they've never done before where they'll six hours to create a trash polka tattoo. Matt made sure that Chris and his alliance Tyler and Dave get the worst canvases, which worked as all three struggled. However the judges eliminated Big Ceeze for having problems throughout his tattoo.; Best Tattoo of the Day: Craig Foster; Bottom: Big Ceeze, Tyler Nolan, Marisa LaRen and Duffy Fortner.; Eliminated: Big Ceeze
72	9	"Like a Moth to the Flame"	August 25, 2015	2.59
Skill of the Week: Saturation; Flash Challenge: The artists work in teams of two where they have to paint panels of wood with fire. Craig, who won the elimination tattoo, assigned all teams. Dave and Marisa who Craig felt were the weakest in competition were paired up won the flash challenge. Marissa and Dave gives Craig a bad canvas who wanted a color tattoo despite her having a dark completion.; Winners: Dave Clarke and Marisa LaRen; Elimination Tattoo: The artists have six hours to tattoo Neptune. Every artist except Chris struggled with their designs. The judges eliminated Marissa for having the worst saturation on her tattoo out of the bottom five.; Best Tattoo of the Day: Chris Blinston; Bottom: Duffy Fortner, Matt O'Baugh, Craig Foster, Tyler Nolan and Marissa LaRen; Eliminated: Marissa LaRen
73	10	"Hell on Wheels"	September 1, 2015	2.74
Skill of the Week: Artistry; Flash Challenge: The artists work in teams of three to paint a full coverage design onto a Dodge Challenger. The winning team's car will then be rewarded to one lucky Ink Master superfan.; Winners: Chris Blinston, Erik Campbell and Craig Foster; Guest Judge: Rose Hardy; Elimination Tattoo: Split into three teams of three, the head to head features the artists tattooing an anatomical heart morph for six hours. Chris, Katie and Matt won their head to head challenge. All four judges eliminated Dave because of him having the worst design and color theory.; Bottom: Duffy Fortner, Erik Campbell and Dave Clarke; Eliminated: Dave Clark
74	11	"Hail Mani"	September 8, 2015	2.74
Skill of the Week: Consistency; Flash Challenge: The remaining artists design matching tattoos for the tattoo virgin's fingernails.; Winner: Tyler Nolan; Elimination Tattoo: During their next head to head challenge, the artists have six hours to tattoo a famous work of art. While Tyler, Chris and Duffy won their head to head challenge, the judges did not pick a winner between Kruseman and Erik after both of them failed with their The Starry Night tattoo. The judges eliminated Katie due to having an unrecognizable tattoo.; Bottom: Matt O'Baugh, Katie McGowan and Kruseman; Eliminated: Katie McGowan
75	12	"Slitting Throats"	September 15, 2015	3.03
Skill of the Week: Finesse; Flash Challenge: The seven artists work on a tattoo designed by the guest artist with down syndrome which will then be placed on their loved ones. Because everyone did solid tattoos, the judges decided not to choose a winner in this flash challenge.; Elimination Tattoo: Prior to the elimination tattoo, Erik assigned all the human canvases after picking the skull with an X on the bottom. The artists had six hours to create a Victorian tattoo on the canvas' throat. Despite Erik giving her a tough canvas, Duffy pulled off finesse in the outline and having a great application. The judges question Chris for going through a lot of trouble in his tattoo. As well as Matt having an unrecognizable tattoo and Erik, for going a simple route but still has issues with his linework which lead to his elimination.; Best Tattoo of the Day: Duffy Fortner; Bottom: Chris Blinston, Matt O'Baugh and Erik Campbell; Eliminated: Erik Campbell
76	13	"Player's Choice"	September 22, 2015	2.87
Skill of the Week: Technical Application; Flash Challenge: The artists have three hours to tattoo a football with an autograph of an NFL player from the superfan's favorite team.; Winner: Tyler Nolan; Elimination Tattoo: The artists interview each NFL player who will then choose which artist they want to get tattooed by. As winner of the flash challenge, Tyler picked his own canvas first. In addition, the artists will have six hours to tattoo the canvas' design of his choice. Despite Núñez picking Kruseman and Dave picking Chris as their favorites, they decided that there is no best tattoo of the day because all the artists disappointed them with their tattoos including some that struggled tattooing darker skin. In the end the judges eliminated Tyler for making excuses for his worst tattoo as well as having the worst technical tattoo.; Elimination: Craig Foster, Duffy Fortner, Tyler Nolan and Kruseman; Eliminated: Tyler Nolan
77	14	"Active Duty"	September 29, 2015	2.89
Skill of the Week: Precision; Flash Challenge: The artists have five hours to create a precised design using only nails; Winner: Kruseman; Elimination Tattoo: The artists have six hours to tattoo a portrait on active military soldiers before they and their loved ones are separated for deployment. Only Krussman and Duffy were in the bottom for lacking precision in their person's tattoo, which led to Duffy being eliminated but is praised for her heart and passion.; Best Tattoo of the Day: Chris Blinston; Bottom: Duffy Fortner and Kruseman; Eliminated: Duffy Fortner
78	15	"Go Big or Go Home"	October 6, 2015	2.95
Marathon Tattoo: The final four artists compete in a tattoo marathon where they will have to tattoo four different designs in four different styles. Each artist will pick a skull that has the style and subject on the bottom and they then have to be incorporated in the design they create, one of the skulls has an artist's choice. Then, they must tattoo their design and the other design created by the competitors. In addition, they will have 90 minutes to tattoo each design one after another on the same canvas. The first part features tattooing a black and grey geometric tattoo that was designed by Matt. Craig's New School popsicle is up next. Chris's fine line black & grey tattoo is the third part of the marathon followed by Kruseman's colored Japanese tattoo. The judges judged all the designs by each artists. Although Chris and Kruseman won in their design, it was Matt prevailed in both his design and New School tattoo.; Winner: Matt O'Baugh; Elimination Tattoo: Chris, Kruseman and Craig have one last head to head battle against themselves that will determine the final two artists who will join Matt in the finale which is revealed that they have six hours to redo their design they botched in the competition. Chris's phoenix didn't fully redeem him as the wings were backwards. Kruseman managed to pull off a better design of his stained glass carousel horse unlike his original one which didn't meet the stained glass tattoo challenge. Craig did a better drawing of his Neptune, but messed up the face. Chris was picked as the last artist going to the finale, but not before arguing with the judges about his tattoo.; Best Tattoo of the Day: Kruseman; Eliminated: Craig Foster
79	16	"Master vs. Apprentice Finale"	October 13, 2015	3.34
Finale Tattoo: The final three have 35 cumulative hours each to create a backpiece in the style and subject of their choice. They also must create a six-hour tattoo live in the style of the viewers' choice. During the finale, the winner who the viewers picked as best six hour tattoo will earn them $10,000 and a spot in the final two. The winner of the live challenge is Chris, advancing to the final two alongside Kruseman. The overall winner is picked by the judges solely on the premise of their 35-hour tattoo.; Winner: Kruseman
