= Ink Master season 5 =

Ink Master: Rivals
- Season 5
- Hosted by: Dave Navarro
- Judges: Chris Núñez; Oliver Peck
- No. of contestants: 18
- Winner: Jason Clay Dunn
- No. of episodes: 16

Release
- Original network: Spike
- Original release: September 2 – December 16, 2014

Season chronology
- ← Previous; Season 4 Next → Master vs. Apprentice

Ink Master: Rivals is the fifth season of the tattooing competition series Ink Master that premiered on Spike on September 2 and concluded on December 16, 2014, with a total of 16 episodes. The show is hosted and judged by Jane's Addiction guitarist Dave Navarro, with accomplished tattoo artists Chris Núñez and Oliver Peck serving as series regular judges. The winner received a $100,000 prize, a feature in Inked Magazine and the title of Ink Master.

The premise of this season was featuring tattoo artist rivals as they compete against each other in an elimination-style competition.

This season saw the returns of season 3 contestants Jason Clay Dunn and Joshua Hibbard, who originally finished the competition in 6th and 5th place respectively.

The winner of the fifth season of Ink Master was Jason Clay Dunn, with James "Cleen Rock One" Steinke being the runner-up.

== Judging and ranking ==
=== Judging Panel ===
The judging panel is responsible for passing judgement on each artist. They collaborate and use information from their own perception, the audience vote, human canvas vote, and the winner's worst vote to determine who should be sent home. Weight of decisions is set by the terms of the challenge skill.

=== Audience Voting ===
Audience voting is done through Facebook and Twitter, and was introduced in season 2. In season 5, the audience vote was used in the finale episode to guarantee one of the finalists a spot in the top two.

=== Human Canvas Jury ===
After the tattoos are completed, the canvases for the challenge gather and vote on the best and worst of that day's tattoos. While the primary judges have the final say, the weight of the canvas vote does affect the judging panels final decision.

== Contestants ==
Names, experience, and cities stated are at time of filming.

Contestant Name	Years of experience	Hometown	Outcome
Jason Clay Dunn	20	Montclair, California	Winner
James "Cleen Rock One" Steinke	19	Las Vegas, Nevada	Runner-up
Erik Siuda	18	Bethpage, New York	3rd place
Mark Longenecker	20	Cocoa Beach, Florida	4th place
Cris Element	8	Brooklyn, New York	5th place
Aaron "Is" Michalowski	16	Tampa, Florida	6th place
Don Peddicord	8	Baltimore, Maryland	7th place
Joshua Hibbard	12	Portland, Oregon	8th place (Note: Hibbard was disqualified from the competition for breaching the contract agreement (possession of marijuana in the competition house).)
Emily Elegado	6	Goose Creek, South Carolina	9th place
Julia Carlson	5	Browns Mills, New Jersey	10th place
Angel Bauta	18	Brooklyn, New York	11th place
Ty'Esha Reels	6	Providence, Rhode Island	12th place
Robbie Ripoll	18	Viera, Florida	13th place
Ryan Eternal	9	Orlando, Florida	14th place
Tim Lees	17	San Diego, California	15th place
Jayvo Scott	13	Melbourne, Florida	16th place
Elton "LT" Duarte	3	Providence, Rhode Island	17th place
Caroline Evans	15	Bradley Beach, New Jersey	18th place

=== Rivalries ===
Rivals	Reason for Rivalry	Winner of Rivalry
Angel Bauta vs. Cris Element	Angel hired Cris in his shop, but after honing his skills, Cris quit when Angel was most in need of his help.	Cris Element
Julia Carlson vs. Caroline Evans	Julia and Caroline are rival co-workers.	Julia Carlson
Elton "LT" Duarte vs. Ty'Esha Reels	After a showdown at a tattoo expo where LT emerged as the victor, Ty’Esha wanted a rematch.	Ty'Esha Reels
Jason Clay Dunn vs. Joshua Hibbard	Jason and Joshua returned to settle their unresolved competition from the third season of Ink Master.	Jason Clay Dunn
Emily Elegado vs. Aaron "Is" Michalowski	Aaron was a guest artist at Emily's shop, where their rivalry started. Both artists felt the other's personality could not be trusted.	Aaron "Is" Michalowski
Ryan Eternal vs. Mark Longenecker	Mark mentored Ryan, but was suspicious when he lost a tattoo competition that Ryan was a judge in. Ryan feels Mark's work is outdated.	Mark Longenecker
Tim Lees vs. James "Cleen Rock One" Steinke	Cleen hired Tim at his shop, but threatened to kick him out over poor work. Tim thinks Cleen has an ego problem.	James "Cleen Rock One" Steinke
Don Peddicord vs. Erik Siuda	Rivalry began through trash talking on social media.	Erik Siuda
Robbie Ripoll vs. Jayvo Scott	Two brothers, Jayvo and Robbie each believe the other's artwork is not up to par.	Robbie Ripoll

== Contestants' progress ==
Contestant	Episode															
Contestant	1 (Note: Julia, LT and Ryan won the Face-Off challenge against their rivals to determine who would stay in the competition.)	2	3 (Note: Erik won his Head-to-Head challenge, but was voted Worst Tattoo of the Day by the Human Canvas Jury.)	4	5	6 (Note: Cleen and Erik were the only contestants to win both of their Head-to-Head challenges.)	7 (Note: Don and Julia defeated Ty'Esha in the Face-Off challenge to determine who would stay in the competition.)	8 (Note: Erik was among the top in the challenge, but was voted Worst Tattoo of the Day by the Human Canvas Jury.)	9	10	11 (Note: Josh won his Head-to-Head challenge, but was disqualified from the competition.)	12	13	14 (Note: Mark defeated Cris in the Face-Off challenge against their rivals to determine who would stay in the competition.)	15	16
Jason Clay Dunn	SAFE	SAFE	SAFE	WIN	WIN	BTM4	SAFE	TOP2	BTM3	SAFE	BTM4	BTM2	SAFE	WIN	ADV	Winner
Cleen Rock One	SAFE	HIGH	WIN	TOP2	WIN	WIN	SAFE	WIN	WIN	BTM4	WIN	WIN	WIN	LOW	WIN	Runner-up
Erik Siuda	SAFE	HIGH	BTM3	SAFE	SAFE	WIN	SAFE	BTM4	SAFE	TOP2	WIN	TOP2	BTM3	SAFE	ADV	Eliminated
Mark Longenecker	BTM3	SAFE	WIN	BTM3	BTM3	BTM4	SAFE	SAFE	SAFE	BTM4	BTM4	SAFE	WIN	BTM2	ELIM	Guest
Cris Element	SAFE	SAFE	SAFE	BTM3	WIN	SAFE	SAFE	SAFE	WIN	BTM4	BTM4	SAFE	BTM3	ELIM		Guest
Aaron Is	SAFE	SAFE	WIN	SAFE	LOW	SAFE	SAFE	SAFE	BTM3	SAFE	WIN	LOW	ELIM			Guest
Don Peddicord	SAFE	SAFE	SAFE	LOW	WIN	SAFE	BTM3	BTM4	WIN	SAFE	BTM4	ELIM				Guest
Joshua Hibbard	SAFE	WIN	WIN	HIGH	SAFE	SAFE	WIN	HIGH	WIN	WIN	DQ					Guest
Emily Elegado	SAFE	SAFE	SAFE	SAFE	BTM3	BTM4	WIN	HIGH	WIN	ELIM						Guest
Julia Carlson	SAFE	HIGH	WIN	SAFE	WIN	LOW	BTM3	BTM4	ELIM							Guest
Angel Bauta	SAFE	LOW	SAFE	SAFE	WIN	SAFE	WIN	ELIM								Guest
Ty'Esha Reels	BTM3	SAFE	WIN	SAFE	WIN	SAFE	ELIM									Guest
Robbie Ripoll	SAFE	BTM3	WIN	HIGH	SAFE	ELIM										Guest
Ryan Eternal	SAFE	SAFE	BTM3	SAFE	ELIM											Guest
Tim Lees	SAFE	BTM3	LOW	ELIM												Guest
Jayvo Scott	SAFE	SAFE	ELIM													Guest
LT	SAFE	ELIM														Guest
Caroline Evans	ELIM															Guest

The contestant won Ink Master.
The contestant was the runner-up.
The contestant was eliminated during the finale.
The contestant advanced to the finale.
The contestant was exempt from the first elimination.
The contestant won Best Tattoo of the Day.
The contestant won their Head-to-Head challenge.
The contestant was among the top.
The contestant received positive critiques.
The contestant received negative critiques.
The contestant was in the bottom.
The contestant was in the bottom and voted Worst Tattoo of the Day by the Human Canvas Jury.
The contestant was eliminated from the competition.
The contestant was voted Worst Tattoo of the Day and was eliminated from the competition.
The contestant was disqualified from the competition.
The contestant returned as a guest for that episode.

== Episodes ==
No. overall	No. in season	Title	Original release date	US viewers (millions)
48	1	"Inking with the Enemy"	September 2, 2014	2.83
Tag Team Tattoo: The artists have six hours to tattoo tag-team style with their rival, switching artists every hour. There is no theme given, and the artists are able to tattoo any style they like. Ty'Esha and LT, Mark and Ryan, and Caroline and Julia are called out as having the worst tattoos of the group.; Face-Off Tattoo: The three rival pairs with the worst tattoos are given four hours to tattoo an open canvas in a style chosen by their rival. Ty'Esha is assigned cursive lettering, while LT is assigned color realism. Caroline is assigned neotraditional, Julia is assigned biomechanical. Mark is assigned color realism, and Ryan is assigned Japanese.; Winning Rivals: LT, Ryan Eternal, Julia Carlson; Defeated Rivals: Ty'Esha Reels, Mark Longenecker, Caroline Evans; Eliminated: Caroline Evans
49	2	"Pin-Up Pitfalls"	September 9, 2014	2.69
Skill of the Week: Artistry; Flash Challenge: The artists are given three hours to airbrush body paint onto semi-nude models to create a realistic pinup style outfit. Each model carries a prop to serve as inspiration for the artists. Joe Manganiello serves as guest judge.; Winner: none: Elimination Tattoo: The artists have six hours to tattoo a pinup, using the models they painted for the Flash Challenge as reference. For each week's elimination tattoo, Dave announces that at least two artists will always tattoo the same subject matter to allow the judges to compare their tattoos side by side.; Best Tattoo of the Day: Joshua Hibbard; Bottom: LT, Robbie Ripoll, Tim Lees; Human Canvas Jury's Pick: LT; Eliminated: LT
50	3	"Head to Heartache"	September 16, 2014	2.25
Skill of the Week: Lines; Flash Challenge: Competing in teams of two, artists have 90 minutes to use match tape (tape with a line of gunpowder along it) to create a linework design on an 8 x 8 canvas which will be ignited to burn the design into the canvas. Having won the previous week's Elimination tattoo, Joshua chooses the pairings and, where possible, places rivals on the same team.; Winners: Emily Elegado and Aaron Is: Elimination Tattoo: Artists have six hours to tattoo ornamental designs on human canvases. The canvases are paired with another canvas who wants the same subject for their tattoo, and artists will be judged head to head with the person assigned their canvas' partner. BJ Betts is guest judge.; Winning Rival: Ty'Esha Reels (vs. Angel Bauta), Erik Siuda (vs. Jason Clay Dunn), Joshua Hibbard (vs. Tim Lees), Cleen Rock One (vs. Don Peddicord), Aaron Is (vs. Cris Element), Julia Carlson (vs. Emily Elegado), Mark Longenecker (vs. Jayvo Scott), Robbie Ripoll (vs. Ryan Eternal); Bottom: Erik Siuda*, Jayvo Scott, Ryan Eternal *-despite winning his pairing, Erik is voted worst tattoo by the human canvas jury; Human Canvas Jury's Pick: Erik Siuda; Eliminated: Jayvo Scott
51	4	"Geishas Gone Wrong"	September 23, 2014	2.44
Skill of the Week: Composition; Flash Challenge: The artists compete to be chosen by only four canvases, who interview each artist before deciding who they want to tattoo a tree on them. Cleen Rock One, Joshua Hibbard, Emily Elegado, and Erik Siuda are chosen.; Winner: Erik Siuda: Elimination Tattoo: The artists have to tattoo Japanese Geishas, with emphasis on fans, flowers, and other accessory items to show composition.; Best Tattoo of the Day: Jason Clay Dunn; Bottom: Tim Lees, Cris Element, Mark Longenecker; Human Canvas Jury's Pick: Cris Element; Eliminated: Tim Lees
52	5	"Glass on Blast"	September 30, 2014	2.45
Skill of the Week: Dimension; Flash Challenge: The artists must sandblast seven panes of glass, placing a different portion of their design on each pane so that when aligned in a stack, the stack creates a 3D illusion. The artists work in teams of two, which are chosen by Jason Clay Dunn, who won last week's Elimination Tattoo. Forrest Cavacco stands in for Oliver Peck.; Winner: Cris Element and Angel Bauta: Elimination Tattoo: Artists are given six hours to tattoo a realistic animal and showcase dimension by making it pop off of the skin. Human canvases are paired with another canvas who wants the same animal subject, and artists will be judged head-to-head. Forrest Cavacco stands in for Oliver Peck, as in the Flash Challenge.; Winning Rival: Ty'Esha Reels (vs. Emily Elegado), Cleen Rock One (vs. Joshua Hibbard), Julia Carlson (vs. Mark Longenecker), Angel Bauta (vs. Ryan Eternal), Cris Element (vs. Aaron Is), Jason Clay Dunn (vs. Erik Siuda), Don Peddicord (vs. Robbie Ripoll); Bottom: Ryan Eternal, Emily Elegado, Mark Longenecker; Human Canvas Jury's Pick: Ryan Eternal; Eliminated: Ryan Eternal
53	6	"Cheek to Cheek"	October 7, 2014	2.61
Skill of the Week: Technical Application; Elimination Tattoo: Artists are asked to create a 12-hour tattoo that covers both their human canvas' butt cheeks, six hours for each cheek.; Bottom: Robbie Ripoll, Emily Elegado, Mark Longenecker, and Jason Clay Dunn; Human Canvas Jury's Pick: Mark Longenecker and Jason Clay Dunn; Eliminated: Robbie Ripoll
54	7	"Three's a Crowd"	October 14, 2014	2.17
Skill of the Week: Fundamentals; Elimination Tattoo: The artists must tag-team an American traditional style tattoo in teams of three.; Best Tattoo of the Day: Joshua Hibbard, Emily Elegado, and Angel Bauta; Bottom: Don Peddicord, Julia Carlson, and Ty'Esha Reels; Face-Off Elimination Tattoo: The bottom three artists go head to head tattooing an American traditional design by Oliver Peck.; Eliminated: Ty'Esha Reels
55	8	"Ink My Oosik"	October 21, 2014	1.89
Skill of the Week: Detail; Flash Challenge: The artists have three hours to etch a detailed design into an oosik (walrus' penile bone) in a scrimshaw challenge.; Winner: Aaron Is: Elimination Tattoo: The artists have six hours to create a biomechanical tattoo. Julia and her canvas are unable to come to a compromise on the design of her tattoo, and she tattoos her own leg as a result. Aaron Cain, an accomplished biomechanical artist, is guest judge.; Best Tattoo of the Day: Cleen Rock One; Bottom: Erik Siuda, Angel Bauta, Don Peddicord, and Julia Carlson; Human Canvas Jury's Pick: Erik Siuda; Eliminated: Angel Bauta
56	9	"Virgin Blood"	October 28, 2014	1.96
Skill of the Week: Adaptability; Flash Challenge: The artists must give human canvases their first tattoos. They are given three hours to work with their clients to create a meaningful design.; Winner: Erik Siuda: Elimination Tattoo: The artists must create interlocking tattoos, one on each arm, that, when joined, create a single image. Artists are assigned a partner by Erik, who won the Flash Challenge, and must tattoo the same canvas simultaneously.; Bottom: Jason Clay Dunn (vs. Cris Element), Aaron Is (vs. Emily Elegado), Julia Carlson (vs. Joshua Hibbard); Human Canvas Jury's Pick: Jason Clay Dunn; Eliminated: Julia Carlson
57	10	"Cold Blooded"	November 4, 2014	2.22
Skill of the Week: Gradation; Flash Challenge: The artists must mix their own ink using pig's blood and paint a 6 x 8 mural, showing gradation.; Winner: Mark Longenecker: Elimination Tattoo: The artists have six hours to tattoo against the guest judge, Tommy Montoya. The subject matter is the same for everyone: Jesus Christ on the cross, in black and grey.; Best Tattoo of the Day: Joshua Hibbard; Bottom: Cleen Rock One, Mark Longenecker, Cris Element, Emily Elegado; Human Canvas Jury's Pick: Cleen Rock One; Eliminated: Emily Elegado
58	11	"Up in Smoke"	November 11, 2014	2.13
Skill of the Week: Finesse; Flash Challenge: Artists must tattoo the residual limb of an amputee.; Winner: Erik Siuda: Elimination Tattoo: Artists have six hours to tattoo their human canvas' spine. Canvases are paired with another client who wants the same subject matter, and their tattoos will be judged head-to-head.; Best Tattoo of the Day: Joshua Hibbard (vs. Jason Clay Dunn); Bottom: Jason Clay Dunn, Don Peddicord (vs. Erik Siuda), Cris Element (vs. Cleen Rock One), Mark Longenecker (vs. Aaron Is); Human Canvas Jury's Pick: Cris Element; Eliminated: Joshua Hibbard - despite winning Best Tattoo of the Day, he admitted to smoking marijuana to help cope with his anxiety, which is a breach of contract
59	12	"Heads Will Roll"	November 18, 2014	2.41
Skill of the Week: Placement; Flash Challenge: The artists are challenged to design a tattoo for NFL player Deangelo Williams, drawn freehand on the skin of a body double. His mother and four aunts died of breast cancer and he wants a unique piece to commemorate his loved ones. Deangelo will select a design to be drawn on his own body and, if he approves, tattooed on him. If no one's tattoo impresses Deangelo, no one will win.; Winner: Cleen Rock One: Elimination Tattoo: Every human canvas wants the same subject on the same location: a skull on their head. Artists' work will be directly compared to everyone else's. Aaron's canvas passes out partway through the tattoo and requires evaluation by the medical team. She comes back around and is cleared to able to complete the tattoo.; Best Tattoo of the Day: Cleen Rock One; Bottom: Jason Clay Dunn, Don Peddicord, Aaron Is; Human Canvas Jury's Pick: Jason Clay Dunn; Eliminated: Don Peddicord
60	13	"Painstaking Portraits"	November 25, 2014	2.28
Skill of the Week: Precision; Flash Challenge: Artists are challenged to work in teams of two to design a pair of on-ear Monster DNA headphones. The winning design will be manufactured and sold alongside Chris Nuñez' design. Cleen Rock One assigns the teams after winning the last Elimination Tattoo and pairs himself with Mark Longenecker. Cris Element is paired with Aaron Is, and Jason Clay Dunn with Erik Siuda.; Winners: Cleen and Mark: Elimination Tattoo: Artists are challenged to tattoo black and grey portraits. Human canvases are arranged in pairs, with both clients wanting the same portrait, and the canvases have brought their subjects with them. The artists' work will be judged head-to-head. Tim Hendricks is guest judge. The judges refused to choose a winner between Aaron and Cris, as they felt each of them had strengths and weaknesses that were evenly matched.; Winning Rival: Mark Longenecker (vs. Erik Siuda), Cleen Rock One (vs. Jason Clay Dunn); Bottom: Aaron Is, Cris Element, Erik Siuda; Human Canvas Jury's Pick: Cris Element; Eliminated: Aaron Is
61	14	"Firing Squad"	December 2, 2014	2.25
Elimination Tattoo: Artists must all tattoo a Grim Reaper on their human canvas. A panel of expert guest judges is arranged to critique the artists alongside Oliver Peck, Chris Nuñez, and Dave Navarro: Mike Rubendall, Rose Hardy, and Nikko Hurtado. There will be no human canvas jury, and Dave Navarro assigns the canvases since there is no Flash Challenge this week.; Best Tattoo of the Day: Jason Clay Dunn; Bottom: Cris Element, Mark Longenecker; Face-Off Tattoo: Jason is asked to create a stencil for a four-hour tattoo that will be completed by both Cris and Mark. He is given full control over style and subject of the tattoo.; Face-Off Winner: Mark Longenecker; Eliminated: Cris Element
62	15	"Fight to the Finale"	December 9, 2014	2.48
Elimination Tattoo: The final four artists' versatility is tested with a random draw for style and subject. Mark Longenecker must tattoo an American traditional skull and snake. Cleen Rock One will tattoo a new school tiger. Erik Siuda pulls a black and grey rose and dagger, and Jason Clay Dunn must tattoo a Japanese pinup. Blank human canvases are randomly assigned, but Jason's canvas walks out when he finds out what the subject is, and Jason is assigned a new random canvas.; Best Tattoo of the Day: Cleen Rock One - advances to finale; Head-to-Head Tattoo: Jason, Mark, and Erik compete against each other to earn the final two spots in the finale. The contestants draw to determine who will choose the subject, and Jason Clay Dunn wins the draw. He chooses birds as the subject, but the style is up to each individual artist.; Eliminated: Mark Longenecker; Master Canvas: The artists will have 35 hours over several sessions to create a back piece for a blank human canvas. The twist? The style is chosen by each artists' two rivals, but the artists can tattoo any subject. Cleen and Erik determine that Jason will tattoo a new school piece. Erik and Jason choose color realism for Cleen. Cleen and Jason select color realism for Erik.
63	16	"Ink Live"	December 16, 2014	3.01
In the live finale, Erik Siuda, Jason Clay Dunn, and Cleen Rock One return to present their master canvases. Jason Clay Dunn is announced the winner of Ink Master season 5.
