= Ink Master season 13 =

Ink Master: Turf War
- Season 13
- Hosted by: Dave Navarro
- Judges: Chris Núñez; Oliver Peck
- No. of contestants: 20
- Winner: N/A
- No. of episodes: 15

Release
- Original network: Paramount Network
- Original release: January 7 – April 14, 2020

Season chronology
- ← Previous; Battle of the Sexes Next → Season 14

Ink Master: Turf War is the thirteenth season of the tattoo reality competition Ink Master that premiered on Paramount Network on January 7 and ended on April 14, 2020 with a total of fifteen episodes. The show is hosted and judged by Jane's Addiction guitarist Dave Navarro, with accomplished tattoo artists Chris Núñez and Oliver Peck serving as series regular judges. The winner was to receive $100,000, a feature in Inked magazine and the title of Ink Master. Due to the COVID-19 pandemic in the United States, the live finale was cancelled and no winner was announced for this season.

The premise of this season was having four teams based on their respective home region with each region being led by an Ink Master veteran.

This season saw the return of four veterans; season 10 contestants Jason Elliott and Frank Ready and season 11 contestants Angel Rose and Jimmy Snaz.

There was no winner for the thirteenth season of Ink Master, due to the COVID-19 pandemic. The three finalists (Bob Jones, Angel Rose and Jimmy Snaz) were awarded an undisclosed value monetary prize instead. The master canvases were revealed on YouTube Live.

== Judging and ranking ==
=== Judging Panel ===
The judging panel is a table of three or more primary judges in addition to the coaches. The judges make their final decision by voting to see who had best tattoo of the day, and who goes home.

=== Jury of Peers ===
The artist who wins best tattoo of the day gives his/her respective team and another team the power to put up one artist for elimination.

=== Pardon ===
Each of the three judges can give a pardon to any eliminated artist of their choosing so that they may return to the competition after being eliminated.

== Contestants ==
Names, experience, and cities stated are at time of filming.

Contestant Name	Years of experience	Hometown	Outcome
Bob Jones	10	Portland, Oregon	Finalists
Angel Rose	3^{1/2}	Los Angeles, California	Finalists
Jimmy Snaz (James Mackenzie)	13	Boston, Massachusetts	Finalists
Jerrell Larkins	8	Greeley, Colorado	4th place
Kelly Severtson	10	Chicago, Illinois	5th place
Hiram Casas	8	Las Vegas, Nevada	6th place
Frank Ready	15	Oklahoma City, Oklahoma	7th place
Jessa Bigelow	6	Harrison, New Jersey	8th place
Jason Elliott	6	College Station, Texas	9th place
Raul Ugarte	13	Roseville, California	10th place
K Lenore Siner	3	Salem, Massachusetts	11th place
Jordi Pla	5	Miami, Florida	12th place
Jordan Allred	8	Boise, Idaho	13th place
Jake Parsons	14	Denver, Colorado	14th place
"Money" Mike Thornton	5	Baton Rouge, Louisiana	15th place
Arlene Salinas	12	Los Angeles, California	16th place
Patrick Flynn	18	Asheville, North Carolina	17th place
Eric "Emac" McKnight	8	Baltimore, Maryland	18th place
Nychelle Elise	6	Plano, Texas	19th place
Andrew Hicks	7	Brooklyn, New York	20th place (Note: Hicks quit the competition.)

=== Regions ===
East
Emac
Jessa Bigelow
Andrew Hicks
K Lenore Siner
Jimmy Snaz

Midwest
Jordan Allred
Jerrel Larkins
Jake Parsons
Frank Ready
Kelly Severtson

South
Nychelle Elise
Jason Elliott
Patrick Flynn
Jordi Pla
Money Mike Thornton

West
Hiram Casas
Bob Jones
Angel Rose
Arlene Salinas
Raul Ugarte

=== Returning veterans ===
Contestants	Original Season	Original Placement
Jason Elliott	Season 10	4th place
Frank Ready	Season 10	8th place
Angel Rose	Season 11	11th place
Jimmy Snaz	Season 11	10th place

== Contestant progress ==
- Indicates the contestant represented the East region.
- Indicates the contestant represented the Midwest region.
- Indicates the contestant represented the South region.
- Indicates the contestant represented the West region.

Contestant	Episode														
Contestant	1 (Note: Arlene, Emac, Jake, Jason, K and Patrick defeated Nychelle in the Face-Off challenge to determine who would stay in the competition.)	2	3 (Note: Jason, Jessa, Jimmy, Jordi, K and Mike defeated Patrick in the Face-Off challenge to determine who would stay in the competition.)	4	5 (Note: Frank, Jason, Jordan, Jordi, Jerrel, Kelly defeated Jake in the Face-Off challenge to determine who would stay in the competition.)	6	7 (Note: Jimmy and Raul defeated Jason in the Face-Off challenge to determine who would stay in the competition.)	8	9	10 (Note: Frank, Jerrel and Jimmy defeated Jason and Raul in the Face-Off challenge to determine who would stay in the competition.)	11	12	13	14 (Note: None of the contestants impressed the judges enough for them to determine a winner.)	15
Jimmy Snaz	SAFE	SAFE	BTM7	HIGH	WIN	HIGH	BTM3	WIN	SAFE	BTM5	SAFE	BTM3	HIGH	LOW	ADV
Angel Rose	SAFE	TOP3	WIN	SAFE	SAFE	WIN	SAFE	SAFE	TOP2	WIN	WIN	IN	TOP2	BTM3	ADV
Bob Jones	SAFE	SAFE	WIN	LOW	SAFE	SAFE	SAFE	SAFE	HIGH	WIN	BTM3	WIN	BTM3	SAFE	ADV
Jerrel Larkins	SAFE	HIGH	WIN	WIN	BTM8	SAFE	WIN	HIGH	WIN	BTM5	TOP2	SAFE	WIN	IN	ELIM
Kelly Severtson	SAFE	HIGH	WIN	HIGH	BTM8	SAFE	WIN	SAFE	HIGH	WIN	SAFE	TOP3	SAFE	BTM3	ELIM
Hiram Casas	SAFE	TOP3	WIN	HIGH	SAFE	SAFE	SAFE	SAFE	SAFE	WIN	SAFE	TOP3	ELIM		
Frank Ready	SAFE	HIGH	WIN	HIGH	BTM8	SAFE	WIN	SAFE	SAFE	BTM5	BTM3	BTM3	ELIM		
Jessa Bigelow	SAFE	SAFE	BTM7	SAFE	WIN	SAFE	SAFE	BTM3	BTM3	WIN	ELIM				
Jason Elliott	BTM7	WIN	BTM7	TOP2	BTM8	SAFE	IN	LOW	BTM3	ELIM					
Raul Ugarte	SAFE	SAFE	WIN	BTM3	SAFE	BTM3	BTM3	SAFE	HIGH	ELIM					
K Lenore Siner	BTM7	BTM3	BTM7	SAFE	WIN	SAFE	SAFE	BTM3	ELIM						
Jordi Pla	SAFE	SAFE	BTM7	SAFE	BTM8	BTM3	SAFE	ELIM							
Jordan Allred	SAFE	SAFE	WIN	BTM3	BTM8	ELIM									
Jake Parsons	BTM7	SAFE	WIN	HIGH	ELIM										
Money Mike	SAFE	SAFE	BTM7	SAFE	ELIM										
Arlene Salinas	BTM7	BTM3	WIN	ELIM											
Patrick Flynn	BTM7	SAFE	ELIM												
Emac	BTM7	ELIM													
Nychelle Elise	ELIM														
Andrew Hicks	QUIT														

The contestant advanced to the finale.
The contestant was exempt from the first elimination.
The contestant won Best Tattoo of the Day.
The contestant won their Head-to-Head challenge.
The contestant was among the top.
The contestant received positive critiques.
The contestant received negative critiques.
The contestant was in the bottom.
The contestant was put in the bottom by the Jury of Peers
The contestant was eliminated from the competition.
The contestant was put in the bottom by the Jury of Peers and was eliminated from the competition.
The contestant was pardoned by a judge and re-entered the competition.
The contestant quit the competition.

== Episodes ==
No. overall	No. in season	Title	Original release date	US viewers (millions)
172	1	"Rep Your Region"	January 7, 2020	0.52
20 artists, including four returning artists, are split into four teams based on regions: east, south, mid-west, and west. Each region has one returning artist. The artists are then challenged to create a tattoo that represents their state. The outline of their respective state must be included in the design. The artists with six lowest scored tattoos face off, with the losing artist being eliminated. Andrew quit the competition because he felt that the judges were giving him too much criticism.: Patriotic Face Off Tattoo: K Lenore Siner, Jason Elliott, Patrick Flynn, Nychelle Elise, Jake Parsons, Arlene Salinas and Emac had one last chance to save themselves by tattooing a patriotic tattoo in the style of their choice.; Eliminated: Nychelle Elise; Quit: Andrew Hicks
173	2	"Clash of the Collages"	January 14, 2020	0.43
Skill of the Week: Fundamentals; Flash Challenge: The teams are challenged to create an image on the side of a tour bus using only postcards.; Winner: South; Elimination Tattoo: The artists are challenged to create tattoos that include a compass rose.; Best Tattoo of the Day: Jason Elliott; Bottom: K Lenore Siner, Emac, Arlene Salinas; Eliminated: Emac
174	3	"Teamwork Makes the Dream Work"	January 21, 2020	0.42
Skill of the Week: Creativity; Elimination Tattoo: The teams are tasked to compete in a tattoo marathon, who tattoos is completely up to them. For the first round, they can tattoo any subject and style they choose but they must collaborate to do one tattoo on one human canvas. In the second round, the remaining teams are required to tag team one tattoo on one human canvas in any subject and style. Two artist are required to tattoo at one time switching out every hour.; Best Tattoo of the Day: Midwest and West; Face Off Tattoo: Jessa Bigelow, Jimmy Snaz, K Lenore Siner, Money Mike Thornton, Patrick Flynn, Jordi Pla, Jason Elliott; Eliminated: Patrick Flynn
175	4	"Battle Lines"	January 28, 2020	0.58
Skill of the Week: Legibility; Flash Challenge: The teams must work together to create a design on an 8’ x 12’ canvas, using only strands of yarn and nails to show a legible work of art.; Winner: West; Elimination Tattoo: The artists must create a schematic tattoo. During the Judge's Recall, Jerrel pointed out that Arlene's schematic tattoo of a Combat Knife was flipped, which reinforced the Judges' decision to eliminate her.; Best Tattoo of the Day: Jerrel Larkins; Bottom: Raul Ugarte, Arlene Salinas, Jordan Allred; Eliminated: Arlene Salinas
176	5	"Out of Your Element"	February 4, 2020	0.51
Skill of the Week: Consistency; Elimination Tattoo: Each region is given one of the four elements to create a series of tattoos. Every artist must tattoo on the same canvas at the same time. The tattoos do not need to be in same style, but must be consistent with their team's tattoos. The west draws fire, the east earth, the south wind, and the mid-west water.; Best Tattoo of the Day: East and West; Bottom: Midwest and South; Eliminated: Money Mike Thornton; Face Off Tattoo: Jason Elliott, Jordi Pla, Jordan Allred, Jerrel Larkins, Jake Parsons, Frank Ready and Kelly Severtson must face off to tattoo an illustrative insect to save themselves in a surprise second elimination.; Eliminated: Jake Parsons
177	6	"Off the Chain"	February 11, 2020	0.49
Skill of the Week: Contrast; Flash Challenge: Create an image by putting cups in each diamond on an 8' x 36' chain link fence.; Winner: Midwest; Elimination Tattoo: Neon light tattoos; Best Tattoo of the Day: Angel Rose; Bottom: Jordi Pla, Raul Ugarte, Jordan Allred; Eliminated: Jordan Allred
178	7	"Head Spin"	February 18, 2020	0.48
Skill of the Week: Adaptability; Elimination Tattoo: Each member of the teams must start a tattoo. After one hour they must switch tattoos within their teams. Each tattoo must be a different style.; Best Tattoos of the Day: Midwest; Face Off Tattoo: Jason Elliott, Jimmy Snaz, Raul Ugarte; Eliminated: Jason Elliott (Pardoned by Dave Navarro)
179	8	"Sugar Rush"	February 25, 2020	0.43
Skill of the Week: Color Theory; Flash Challenge: Show color theory by sticking candy on an 8' x 8' board.; Winner: Midwest; Elimination Tattoo: The remaining artists must create new school food tattoos.; Best Tattoo of the Day: Jimmy Snaz; Bottom: Jordi Pla, K Lenore Siner, Jessa Bigelow; Eliminated: Jordi Pla
180	9	"Artistry on the Line"	March 3, 2020	0.48
Skill of the Week: Artistry; Flash Challenge: Create a sculpture by suspending colored buttons from fishing line.; Winner: Midwest and East; Elimination Tattoo: The artist must create full pinup tattoo from head to toe.; Best Tattoo of the Day: Jerrel Larkins; Bottom: Jason Elliott, K Lenore Siner, Jessa Bigelow; Eliminated: K Lenore Siner
181	10	"Every Artist for Themselves"	March 10, 2020	0.43
Elimination Tattoo: The remaining artists, regardless of region, go head to head tattooing in different styles: fine line black and grey, American Traditional, Japanese, Biomech, and tribal.; Face off: Jason Elliot, Jimmy Snaz, Jerrel Larkins, Raul Ugarte and Frank Ready; Bottom: Raul Ugarte, Jason Elliot and Frank Ready; Eliminated: Raul Ugarte and Jason Elliott
182	11	"From Toast to Toast"	March 17, 2020	0.59
Skill of the Week: Shading; Flash Challenge: Make an image by toasting slices of bread using a blow torch.; Winner: West; Elimination Tattoo: The remaining artists must tattoo black and grey realistic US landmarks.; Best Tattoo of the Day: Angel Rose; Bottom: Frank Ready, Jessa Bigelow, Bob Jones; Eliminated: Jessa Bigelow
183	12	"Last Draw"	March 24, 2020	0.67
Skill of the Week: Versatility; Elimination Tattoo: The remaining contestants had to tattoo designs drawn by the other artist they called out. The artists then had to tattoo the design they originally drew for their opponent themselves.; Best Tattoo of the Day: Bob Jones; Bottom: Angel Rose, Jimmy Snaz, Frank Ready; Eliminated: Angel Rose (Pardoned by Oliver Peck)
184	13	"There Can Only Be One"	March 31, 2020	0.71
Skill of the Week: Precision; Flash Challenge: Create a design on a blank canvas by only using staples. Each artist worked solo.; Winner: Jerrel Larkins; Elimination Tattoo: Senior Citizen Portraits; Best Tattoo of the Day: Jerrel Larkins; Bottom: Bob Jones, Hiram Casas, Frank Ready; Eliminated: Frank Ready and Hiram Casas
185	14	"Compose Yourself"	April 7, 2020	0.63
Skill of the Week: Composition; Flash Challenge: The five remaining artists have to paint designs on protective helmets for people that need to wear them on a daily basis; Winner: Bob Jones; Elimination Tattoo: Japanese style cranes; Best Tattoo of the Day: None; Bottom: Jerrel Larkins, Angel Rose, Kelly Severtson; Eliminated: Jerrel Larkins (Pardoned by Chris Nunez)
186	15	"Race to the Finish"	April 14, 2020	0.67
Elimination Tattoo: The five remaining artists pick the style and subject for their opponents; Best Tattoo of the Day: Bob Jones; Eliminated: Kelly Severtson; Tattoo Marathon: Jerrel Larkins, Angel Rose and Jimmy Snaz each design five tattoos containing the number 13 for a 13 hours convention style elimination; Eliminated: Jerrel Larkins; In order to win the season, the three finalists must do two 25 hour Master Canvases. One on the chest and one on the back. In addition to the Master Canvases, the artists have to do a 6 hour piece at the live finale. However, due to the coronavirus pandemic, the live finale was cancelled and no winner was announced.
