= Ink Master season 2 =

Ink Master
- Season 2
- Hosted by: Dave Navarro
- Judges: Chris Núñez; Oliver Peck
- No. of contestants: 16
- Winner: Steve Tefft
- No. of episodes: 13

Release
- Original network: Spike
- Original release: October 9 – December 18, 2012

Season chronology
- ← Previous; Season 1 Next → Season 3

The second season of the tattoo reality competition Ink Master premiered on Spike on October 9 and concluded December 18, 2012 with a total of 13 episodes. The show is hosted and judged by Jane's Addiction guitarist Dave Navarro, with accomplished tattoo artists Chris Núñez and Oliver Peck serving as series regular judges. The winner received a $100,000 cash prize, a feature in Inked Magazine and the title of Ink Master.

The winner of the second season of Ink Master was Steve Tefft, with Sarah Miller being the runner-up.

== Contestants ==
Names, experience, and cities stated are at time of filming.

Contestant	Years of experience	Hometown	Outcome
Steve Tefft	17	Groton, Connecticut	Winner
Sarah Miller	6	Pittsburgh, Pennsylvania	Runner-up
Sebastian Murphy	15	Detroit, Michigan	3rd place
Katherine "Tatu Baby" Flores	6	Miami, Florida	4th place
Jesse Smith	15	Richmond, Virginia	5th place
Jamie Davies	17	Redding, California	6th place
Clint Cummings †	16	Dallas, Texas	7th place
Mark Matthews	14	San Francisco, California	8th place
Steven "Kay Kutta" Givens	3	Fayetteville, North Carolina	9th place
Lalo Yunda	20	Brooklyn, New York	10th place
Tray Benham	20	Brandenburg, Kentucky	11th place
Nick D'Angelo	4	Buffalo, New York	12th place
Ron Givens	7	Dallas, Texas	13th place
Mike Tacij	14	White Plains, New York	14th place
Thomas "TJ Hal" Halvorsen	7	Bronx, New York	15th place (Note: Halvorsen withdrew from the competition due to medical reasons.)
Cee Jay Jones	15	Detroit, Michigan	16th place

Notes

† Indicates that the contestant died after filming ended

== Contestant progress ==
Contestant	Episode												
Contestant	1 (Note: Sebastian and Steve were announced as having the top 2 tattoos of the day, yet neither one of them were declared as the winner.)	2	3 (Note: None of the contestants impressed the judges enough for them to determine a winner.)	4	5 (Note: Tray was not present during the elimination for medical reasons.)	6	7	8	9	10	11	12	13
Steve Tefft	TOP2	SAFE	SAFE	SAFE	WIN	WIN	LOW	HIGH	BTM3	WIN	TOP2	WIN	Winner
Sarah Miller	SAFE	HIGH	SAFE	WIN	SAFE	SAFE	TOP2	BTM3	SAFE	BTM2	WIN	ADV	Runner-up
Sebastian Murphy	TOP2	SAFE	SAFE	SAFE	SAFE	SAFE	SAFE	SAFE	SAFE	SAFE	BTM2	ADV	Eliminated
Tatu Baby	SAFE	SAFE	BTM4	SAFE	SAFE	SAFE	WIN	WIN	BTM3	TOP2	HIGH	ELIM	Guest
Jesse Smith	SAFE	WIN	LOW	TOP2	TOP2	LOW	SAFE	SAFE	WIN	HIGH	ELIM		Guest
Jamie Davies	SAFE	SAFE	SAFE	SAFE	SAFE	TOP2	HIGH	SAFE	HIGH	ELIM			Guest
Clint Cummings	SAFE	HIGH	BTM4	SAFE	SAFE	SAFE	SAFE	BTM3	ELIM				Guest
Mark Matthews	SAFE	SAFE	SAFE	LOW	BTM3	BTM2	BTM2	ELIM					Guest
Kay Kutta	BTM2	SAFE	HIGH	SAFE	BTM3	LOW	ELIM						Guest
Lalo	SAFE	BTM3	LOW	BTM2	SAFE	ELIM							Guest
Tray Benham	SAFE	BTM3	BTM4	SAFE	ELIM								Guest
Nick D'Angelo	SAFE	SAFE	LOW	ELIM									Guest
Ron Givens	SAFE	SAFE	ELIM										Guest
Mike Tacij	SAFE	ELIM											Guest
TJ Hal	SAFE	WD											Guest
Cee Jay Jones	ELIM												Guest

The contestant won Ink Master.
The contestant was the runner-up.
The contestant was eliminated during the finale.
The contestant advanced to the finale.
The contestant won Best Tattoo of the Day.
The contestant was among the top.
The contestant received positive critiques.
The contestant received negative critiques.
The contestant was in the bottom.
The contestant was eliminated from the competition.
The contestant withdrew from the competition due to medical reasons.
The contestant returned as a guest for that episode.

== Episodes ==
No. overall	No. in season	Title	Original release date	US viewers (millions)
9	1	"Tattooing the Dead"	October 9, 2012	1.6
Skill of the Week: Fundamentals; Flash Challenge: The artists are made to believe that they will be tattooing dead bodies. However, once they enter a morgue, they quickly learn the "bodies" are silicone mannequins. They are then told that they have three hours to tattoo a snake and dagger design on a certain part of their silicone mannequin.; Winner: Jesse Smith; Elimination Tattoo: The artists' first elimination tattoo has them tattooing a design of their choice on a tattoo virgin. During the Judges' talk about the top and bottom tattoos, Dave pointed out to Oliver and Chris that Cee Jay's tattoo was misspelled, and forced her to read her tattoo in front of the top and bottom contestants, resulting in her elimination, although Kay was almost chopped.; Top 2 Tattoos: Steve Tefft and Sebastian Murphy; Bottom 2: Cee Jay Jones and Kay Kutta; Eliminated: Cee Jay Jones
10	2	"Semi-Nude 911"	October 9, 2012	0.9
Skill of the Week: Ingenuity; Flash Challenge: Each artist had three hours to camouflage a half-naked woman to blend into the side of a building using body paint. TJ suffered an injury to his previously injured back during the challenge, caused by him crouching down while trying to paint his model.; Winner: Kay Kutta; Elimination Challenge: The artists must cover up an unwanted tattoo on their canvas. Prior to the elimination tattoo, TJ announced his withdrawal from the competition in order to avoid permanent damage to his back and the fact that he is unable to quickly recover. However, although TJ withdrew, someone was still eliminated, that person being Mike.; Guest Judge: Terrell Suggs; Withdrew: TJ Hall; Best Tattoo of the Day: Jesse Smith; Bottom 3: Lalo, Mike Tacij and Tray Benham; Eliminated: Mike Tacij
11	3	"The 80 Year Old Virgin"	October 16, 2012	1.1
Skill of the Week: Lines; Flash Challenge: The artists line skills are put to the test at a barber shop, where they must shave a design on the head of a human canvas in sixty minutes.; Winner: Kay Kutta; Elimination Tattoo: The artists must tattoo American traditional tattoos on special human canvases: Military veterans. The design must include an eagle and a flag. For the first time in Ink Master history, the judges declared no winner of this Elimination Tattoo as they were unimpressed with everyone's tattoo. Although all members of the bottom 4 have a reason to be justifiably sent home, in the end Ron is sent packing.; Guest Judge: Richard Stell; Bottom 4: Clint Cummings, Ron Givens, Tatu Baby and Tray Benham; Eliminated: Ron Givens
12	4	"Tattoo Her What?"	October 23, 2012	1.0
Skill of the Week: Color; Guest Judge: Matt Barnes; Flash Challenge: For the flash challenge, the remaining twelve contestants are split into two groups of six where they must tattoo a specific design in 90 minutes- the first group had to tattoo a lotus flower and water, while the second group had to tattoo a skull with a top hat. The best tattoo from each group would advance to the final round. Group 1 consisted of Clint, Jamie, Kay Kutta, Steve, Tatu Baby and Tray. Group 2 consisted of Lalo, Jesse, Mark, Nick, Sarah and Sebastian. Tray and Sarah were the top members of their respective groups and their final head-to-head battle had them tattooing a gypsy woman, which Tray wins by a landslide, as Sarah's tattoo misses the mark.; Winner: Tray Benham; Elimination Tattoo: The artists are tested on new school designs, which thrills Jesse. However, Sarah wins. Nick is asked to close shop.; Best Tattoo of the Day: Sarah Miller; Bottom 2: Lalo and Nick D'Angelo; Eliminated: Nick D'Angelo
13	5	"Trick or Freak"	October 30, 2012	0.6
Skill of the Week: Texture; Flash Challenge: The artists head to Coney Island for a freaky Flash Challenge where they had 30 minutes to tattoo the inside of the mouth of a human canvas.; Winner: Clint Cummings; Elimination Tattoo: The artists work on horror style tattoos that have texture. After the critique, Tray revealed that he had developed blood clots after getting surgery and left his medications at home before entering the competition. He collapses and is rushed to the hospital. Dave informs Steve, Kay, and Mark that Tray has been medically cleared to come back, but he is also put up for elimination. However, due to Tray's tattoo not meeting the challenge, Tray ended up being eliminated, which resulted in Kay and Mark being safe from elimination.; Best Tattoo of the Day: Steve Tefft; Bottom: Kay Kutta, Mark Matthews and Tray Benham; Eliminated: Tray Benham
14	6	"Half Naked and Fully Loaded"	November 6, 2012	0.7
Skill of the Week: Attention to Detail; Flash Challenge: The artists etch a detailed design into the buttstock of a rifle. Due to his federal probation and the fact that he can't use guns after serving nine years in jail, Kay Kutta did not participate in this Flash Challenge.; Winner: Steve Tefft; Elimination Tattoo: The artists had five hours to tattoo pin-up designs in any style. But before that, they had 30 minutes in a photo shoot to take pictures and use one of the pin-up model's pose as a reference in their tattoo.; Best Tattoo of the Day: Steve Tefft; Bottom: Mark Matthews and Lalo; Eliminated: Lalo
15	7	"Star Wars Forever"	November 13, 2012	0.8
Skill of the Week: Contrast; Flash Challenge: The artists had four hours to paint a Clone Trooper helmet with an emphasis on contrast. Dave also announced that all helmets from the flash challenge were auctioned off at Star Wars Celebration VI with all proceeds going to the Make-A-Wish Foundation.; Winner: Clint Cummings; Elimination Tattoo: The artists had five hour to design Star Wars tattoos on die hard fans.; Best Tattoo of the Day: Tatu Baby; Bottom: Kay Kutta and Mark Matthews; Eliminated: Kay Kutta
16	8	"Holy Ink"	November 20, 2012	0.9
Skill of the Week: Gradiation; Flash Challenge: Each pair had four hours to create a collaborative design on a 7x7 scratchboard that was later viewed under a blacklight.; Winners: Jesse Smith & Tatu Baby; Elimination Tattoo: The artists work in teams of two where they had five hours to create a black and gray good and evil tattoo at the same time with one tattooing good side and the other tattooing the evil side.; Guest Judge: Freddy Negrete; Best Tattoo of the Day: Tatu Baby; Bottom: Sarah Miller, Mark Matthews and Clint Cummings; Eliminated: Mark Matthews
17	9	"Buck Off"	November 27, 2012	1.1
Skill of the Week: Balance; Flash Challenge: The artists head to Johnny Utah's where they were entertained by a mechanical bull rider. Each artist had two hours to burn a design into a cowgirl's chaps.; Winner: Jamie Davies; Elimination Tattoo: The artists tackle Japanese designs.; Guest Judge: Mike Rubendall; Guest Canvas: Brent Weedman and Lloyd Woodard; Best Tattoo of the Day: Jesse Smith; Bottom: Clint Cummings, Tatu Baby and Steve Tefft; Eliminated: Clint Cummings
18	10	"Blowing Chunks"	December 4, 2012	1.0
Skill of the Week: Dimension; Flash Challenge: The artists had three hours to design one of Dave's signature guitars.; Winner: Jesse Smith; Elimination Tattoo: The final six had to incorporate dimension in their animal tattoo.; Guest Judge: Forrest Cavacco; Guest Canvas: Jeff Hardy; Best Tattoo of the Day: Steve Tefft; Bottom: Sarah Miller and Jamie Davies; Eliminated: Jamie Davies
19	11	"Better Than Words?"	December 11, 2012	1.1
Skill of the Week: Precision; Flash Challenge: The artists had 60 minutes to tattoo a mini Jägermeister logo.; Winner: Steve Tefft; Elimination Tattoo: The artists had six hours to tackle Bob Tyrell's specialty which was a painstaking portrait tattoo.; Guest Judge: Bob Tyrrell; Best Tattoo of the Day: Sarah Miller; Bottom: Jesse Smith and Sebastian Murphy; Eliminated: Jesse Smith
20	12	"The Bigger They Are"	December 18, 2012	1.3
Skill of the Week: All Skills; Elimination Tattoo: The final four artists attempt to race toward the finish as they had to put every skill on the line for six hours. The canvases in this Elimination Tattoo turned out to be professional athletes. The athletes met with each artist and chose who would tattoo them based on a random order.; Guest Canvas: King Mo, Scott McKillop, Charlie Johnson and Marcus Stroud; Best Tattoo of the Day: Steve Tefft; Eliminated: Tatu Baby; Final Tattoo – Part 1: Each artist is assigned a master canvas where they can tattoo their own way. They then have 24 hours to complete their final tattoo with each four sessions consisting of six hours before returning to New York in a few months to show off their piece in front of the judges during the live finale.
21	13	"Ink Master Live Final"	December 18, 2012	1.3
Dave welcomes the audience to the very first live Ink Master finale. He, Peck and Nunez then chat with the eliminated artists. Nick's canvas calls him out for tattooing her the design she despised. Dave also got to chat with Mark's canvas who dislikes the pin-up tattoo. Fortunately, he plans of getting it covered by Season 1 runner-up and star of Tattoo Nightmares Tommy Helm who appeared alongside his co-stars. During the show, the audience voted online to give one of the eliminated artists a chance to compete in Season 3.: Final Tattoo – Part 2: Steve, Sarah and Sebastian finally hit the stage. But there is some unfinished business between all three of them. Footage from their 24 hour session are then shown. The judges then look at each artist's final tattoo. Another twist is thrown when it turns out that the first artist with the fewest votes by the viewers will be eliminated.; 3rd Place: Sebastian; Winner: Steve Tefft; America's Vote: Tatu Baby
