= Ink Master season 1 =

Ink Master
- Season 1
- Hosted by: Dave Navarro
- Judges: Chris Núñez; Oliver Peck
- No. of contestants: 10
- Winner: Shane O'Neill
- No. of episodes: 8

Release
- Original network: Spike
- Original release: January 17 – March 6, 2012

Season chronology
- Next → Season 2

The first season of the tattoo reality competition Ink Master debuted on Spike on January 17 and concluded on March 6, 2012, with a total of 8 episodes. The show is hosted and judged by Jane's Addiction guitarist Dave Navarro, with accomplished tattoo artists Chris Núñez and Oliver Peck serving as series regular judges. The winner received a $100,000 prize, a feature in Inked Magazine and the title of Ink Master.

The winner of the first season of Ink Master was Shane O'Neill, with Tommy Helm being the runner-up.

== Contestants ==
Names, ages, and cities stated are at time of filming.

Contestant	Age	Hometown	Outcome
Shane O'Neill	39	Middletown, Delaware	Winner
Tommy Helm	38	Brentwood, New York	Runner-up
James Vaughn	38	Asheboro, North Carolina	3rd place
Josh Woods	30	Nashville, Tennessee	4th place
Léa Vendetta	40	Boca Raton, Florida	5th place
Bili Vegas	29	New York, New York	6th place
Heather Sinn	41	Los Angeles, California	7th place
Al Fliction	42	Brooklyn, New York	8th place
Jeremy Miller	27	Austin, Texas	9th place
Brian "B-TAT" Robinson	30	East Orange, New Jersey	10th place

== Contestant progress ==
Contestant	Episode							
Contestant	1	2	3	4	5	6	7	8
Shane O'Neill	TOP2	SAFE	WIN	HIGH	SAFE	WIN	WIN	Winner
Tommy Helm	WIN	SAFE	SAFE	SAFE	SAFE	BTM3	TOP2	Runner-up
James Vaughn	SAFE	WIN	SAFE	SAFE	TOP2	BTM3	BTM2	Eliminated
Josh Woods	SAFE	SAFE	BTM3	BTM3	WIN	TOP2	ELIM	
Léa Vendetta	SAFE	BTM3	HIGH	WIN	BTM2	ELIM		
Bili Vegas	SAFE	HIGH	BTM3	BTM3	ELIM			
Heather Sinn	LOW	SAFE	SAFE	ELIM				
Al Fliction	SAFE	BTM3	ELIM					
Jeremy Miller	BTM2	ELIM						
B-TAT	ELIM							

The contestant won Ink Master.
The contestant was the runner-up.
The contestant was eliminated during the finale.
The contestant won Best Tattoo of the Day.
The contestant was among the top.
The contestant received positive critiques.
The contestant received negative critiques.
The contestant was in the bottom.
The contestant was eliminated from the competition.

== Episodes ==
No. overall	No. in season	Title	Original release date	US viewers (millions)
1	1	"Fresh Meat"	January 17, 2012	1.4
Skill of the Week: Raw Talent; Flash Challenge: The artists must go inside a smelly slaughterhouse where they have 90 minutes to tattoo a skull in the style of their choice on a pig carcass.; Winner: Josh Woods; Elimination Tattoo: The artists must cover up their canvases' tattoo they regret getting. Jeremy's canvas has difficulty sitting through Jeremy's cover-up tattoo, which results in her walking out, leaving Jeremy's tattoo unfinished. Jeremy is up for elimination, but B-TAT ends up getting eliminated for producing a sloppy and amateurish tattoo.; Best Tattoo of the Day winner: Tommy Helm; Bottom 2: B-TAT and Jeremy Miller; Eliminated: B-TAT
2	2	"Botched Head Tattoo"	January 24, 2012	0.8
Skill of the Week: Lines; Flash Challenge: The artists must show their line work on a car. The cars are numbered from 1-9, so each artist must pick a key that contains a number, and that becomes their assigned car to work on.; Guest Judge: Ton Jones; Winner: Bili Vegas; Elimination Tattoo: The artists must tattoo a tribal design. Problems occur during the elimination tattoo. Due to his canvas' condition with psoriasis, Shane ends up tattooing Flash Challenge guest judge Ton, as it's the only option for him to make a finished tattoo. Bili struggles tattooing his canvases whose blood pressure started to go down while getting his head tattoo. Therefore, he was unable to finish it. Al and Léa both produce bad tattoos, but Jeremy is sent home.; Best Tattoo of the Day: James Vaughn; Bottom 3: Al Fliction, Léa Vendetta and Jeremy Miller; Eliminated: Jeremy Miller
3	3	"Pasties and a Camel Toe"	January 31, 2012	0.6
Skill of the Week: Shading; Flash Challenge: The artists must body-paint a 3D design on their model.; Winner: Al Fliction; Elimination Tattoo: The artists must design a black and grey tattoo on their canvas. Bili and Josh produce less-than desirable tattoos, however Al is ultimately eliminated.; Best Tattoo of the Day: Shane O'Neill; Bottom 3: Al Fliction, Bili Vegas and Josh Woods; Eliminated: Al Fliction
4	4	"Ink Disaster Piece"	February 7, 2012	1.0
Skill of the Week: Technical Precision; Guest Judge: Todd Weinberger; Flash Challenge: The artists must carefully placed a bevel star on the client's choice spot in either the knee or elbow.; Winner: Josh Woods; Elimination Tattoo: The artist must tattoo a photo realism tattoo on their canvas. In the end, a tearful Heather is eliminated.; Best Tattoo of the Day: Léa Vendetta; Bottom 3: Bili Vegas, Heather Sinn and Josh Woods; Eliminated: Heather Sinn
5	5	"Game On"	February 14, 2012	0.9
Skill of the Week: Color; Guest Judge: Scott Campbell; Flash challenge: The artists must paint prosthetics on their canvas that reflect their amputated canvas' personality.; Winner: Shane O'Neill; Elimination Tattoo: The artists must create a colorful American Traditional tattoo. A shocked Bili is eliminated.; Best Tattoo of the Day: Josh Woods; Bottom 2: Bili Vegas and Léa Vendetta; Eliminated: Bili Vegas
6	6	"Permanent Mistakes"	February 21, 2012	0.9
Skill of the Week: Proportion; Guest Judge: Chris "Birdman" Andersen; Flash Challenge: The artists meet Dave at a church that serves as inspiration behind their next challenge. They each have 45 minutes to tattoo prayer hands on their canvas.; Winner: Tommy Helm; Elimination Tattoo: The artists must tattoo a pin-up tattoo that shows proportion. Léa is ultimately eliminated.; Best Tattoo of the Day: Shane O'Neill; Bottom 3: James Vaughn, Léa Vendetta and Tommy Helm; Eliminated: Léa Vendetta
7	7	"Picture Imperfect"	February 28, 2012	1.3
Skill of the Week: Lettering; Guest Judge: Jack Rudy; Flash Challenge: The artists must spray paint a graffiti design on a bare wall.; Winner: Shane O'Neill; Elimination Tattoo: Portrait tattoos highlight the elimination tattoo, but some artists feel uncomfortable with the subject because they also needed to include lettering in their portrait while capturing the likeness. Josh is eliminated just before the finals.; Best Tattoo of the Day: Shane O'Neill; Bottom 2: James Vaughn and Josh Woods; Eliminated: Josh Woods
8	8	"Ink Master Revealed"	March 6, 2012	1.1
Final Elimination Tattoo: The judges pick a random design for each artist that is based on their portfolio and their work on the show. Peck assigns James with the Japanese half sleeve, Navarro gives Tommy the dark and heavy tattoo, and Núñez picks another Japanese tattoo for Shane, but bigger. The artists have 12 hours to tattoo their tattoo. However, that is not the only part of the elimination tattoo as they also have to create a 6-hour tattoo in the style of their choice.; Winner: Shane O'Neill; Runner-Up: Tommy Helm; 3rd Place: James Vaughn
