= Ink Master season 4 =

Ink Master
- Season 4
- Hosted by: Dave Navarro
- Judges: Chris Núñez; Oliver Peck
- No. of contestants: 17
- Winner: Scott Marshall
- No. of episodes: 13

Release
- Original network: Spike
- Original release: February 25 – May 20, 2014

Season chronology
- ← Previous; Season 3 Next → Season 5

The fourth season of the tattoo reality competition Ink Master premiered on Spike on February 25 and concluded on May 20, 2014, with a total of 13 episodes. The show is hosted and judged by Jane's Addiction guitarist Dave Navarro, with accomplished tattoo artists Chris Núñez and Oliver Peck serving as series regular judges. The winner will receive a $100,000 prize, a feature in Inked Magazine and the title of Ink Master.

This season saw the return of season 3 contestant Kyle Dunbar, who originally finished the competition in 4th place.

The winner of the fourth season of Ink Master was Scott Marshall, with Walter "Sausage" Frank being the runner-up.

== Judging and ranking ==
=== Judging panel ===
The judging panel is responsible for passing judgement on each artist. They collaborate and use information from their own perception, the audience vote, human canvas vote, and the winner's worst vote to determine who should be sent home. Weight of decisions is set by the terms of the challenge skill.

=== Audience voting ===
Audience voting, introduced in season two, is done through Facebook and Twitter using the available tattoos for vote on the Ink Master website. Voting will directly affect the contestant lineup for the following season; the contestant with the highest vote count will have the opportunity to return.

=== Human Canvas Jury ===
The canvases for the challenge gather after the tattoos are completed and vote on the best and worst of the days tattoos. While the primary judges have the final say, the weight of the canvas vote does affect the final decision of the judging panel.

=== Elimination Tattoo Winner's pick ===
This season allowed the winner of the elimination tattoo challenge to put a contestant in the bottom.

== Contestants ==
Names, experience, and cities stated are at time of filming.

Contestant Name	Years of experience	Hometown	Outcome
Scott Marshall †	15	Chicago, Illinois	Winner
Walter "Sausage" Frank	13	Las Vegas, Nevada	Runner-up
Matti Hixson	10	Virginia Beach, Virginia	3rd place
Sean Patrick "Halo" Jankowski	9	Baltimore, Maryland	4th place
Melissa Monroe	5	Farmington, Wisconsin	5th place
"Gentle" Jay Blondel	14	Massapequa, New York	6th place
Lydia Bruno	9	Albany, New York	7th place
Kyle Dunbar	20	Flint, Michigan	8th place (Note: Dunbar was disqualified from the competition due to a physical altercation with Chris Núñez.)
Jim Francis	12	Milwaukee, Wisconsin	9th/10th place
Josh "King Ruck" Glover	6	Las Vegas, Nevada	9th/10th place
Keith Diffenderfer	13	York, Pennsylvania	11th/12th place
Aaron "Bubba" Irwin	7	Scottsdale, Arizona	11th/12th place
Roland Pacheco	8	Hawi, Hawaii	13th place
Randy Vollink	9	Mesa, Arizona	14th place
David Bell	20	Fredericksburg, Virginia	15th place
Ashley Bennett	6	South Windsor, Connecticut	16th place (Note: Bennett quit the competition.)
Damon Butler	3	Boston, Massachusetts	17th place

Notes

†: Indicates that the artist has since died after filming

== Contestants' progress ==
Contestant	Episode												
Contestant	1	2 (Note: None of the contestants impressed the judges enough for them to determine a winner.)	3	4	5	6	7	8	9	10 (Note: Melissa defeated Jay in the Face-Off challenge to determine who would stay in the competition.)	11	12	13
Scott Marshall	SAFE	HIGH	TOP2	WIN	WIN	TOP3	TOP2	SAFE	HIGH	WIN	BTM3	ADV	Winner
Sausage	SAFE	SAFE	WIN	TOP3	HIGH	WIN	SAFE	WIN	SAFE	LOW	SAFE	WIN	Runner-up
Matti Hixson	SAFE	SAFE	SAFE	TOP3	SAFE	TOP3	SAFE	HIGH	WIN	LOW	WIN	ADV	Eliminated
Halo	HIGH	HIGH	HIGH	LOW	HIGH	SAFE	WIN	BTM3	SAFE	WIN	BTM3	ELIM	Guest
Melissa Monroe	HIGH	SAFE	SAFE	SAFE	HIGH	HIGH	BTM4	BTM3	BTM2	BTM2	ELIM		Guest
Gentle Jay	SAFE	SAFE	SAFE	SAFE	LOW	SAFE	BTM4	LOW	BTM2	ELIM			Guest
Lydia Bruno	SAFE	SAFE	SAFE	SAFE	BTM2	SAFE	SAFE	ELIM					Guest
Kyle Dunbar	SAFE	SAFE	HIGH	LOW	SAFE	SAFE	LOW	DQ					Guest
Jim Francis	SAFE	SAFE	HIGH	HIGH	LOW	LOW	ELIM						Guest
King Ruck	SAFE	SAFE	LOW	LOW	SAFE	BTM3	ELIM						Guest
Keith Diffenderfer	SAFE	SAFE	SAFE	SAFE	LOW	ELIM							Guest
Bubba Irwin	SAFE	SAFE	BTM3	BTM3	SAFE	ELIM							Guest
Roland Pacheco	BTM3	BTM3	BTM3	BTM3	ELIM								Guest
Randy Vollink	BTM3	BTM3	LOW	ELIM									Guest
David Bell	LOW	SAFE	ELIM										Guest
Ashley Bennett	SAFE	QUIT											Guest
Damon Butler	ELIM												Guest

The contestant won Ink Master.
The contestant was the runner-up.
The contestant was eliminated during the finale.
The contestant advanced to the finale.
The contestant was exempt from the first elimination.
The contestant won Best Tattoo of the Day.
The contestant was among the top.
The contestant received positive critiques.
The contestant received mixed critiques.
The contestant received negative critiques.
The contestant was in the bottom.
The contestant was in the bottom and voted Worst Tattoo of the Day by the Human Canvas Jury.
The contestant was put in the bottom by the Best Tattoo of the Day winner.
The contestant was put in the bottom by the Best Tattoo of the Day winner and voted Worst Tattoo of the Day by the Human Canvas Jury.
The contestant was eliminated from the competition.
The contestant was voted Worst Tattoo of the Day and was eliminated from the competition.
The contestant was put in the bottom by the Best Tattoo of the Day winner and was eliminated from the competition.
The contestant was put in the bottom by the Best Tattoo of the Day winner, voted Worst Tattoo by the Human Canvas Jury and was eliminated from the competition.
The contestant quit the competition.
The contestant was disqualified from the competition.
The contestant returned as a guest for that episode

== Episodes ==
No. overall	No. in season	Title	Original release date	US viewers (millions)
35	1	"Earn it!"	February 25, 2014	2.54
Flash Challenge: All artists, except for Kyle, must tattoo hundreds of canvases in a convention style. The winners in this challenge will not only receive their own shop but will also not participate in the elimination tattoo.; Winners: Matti Hixson, Scott Marshall, Ashley Bennett, Jim Francis and Sausage; Elimination Tattoo: The remaining artists have been given one last chance to convince the judges that they deserve to be in the competition by tattooing in their own style. There was no winner for this challenge, but the judges selected Halo and Melissa as their favorites.; Bottom: Roland Pacheco, Damon Butler and Randy Vollink; Eliminated: Damon Butler
36	2	"Bug Out"	March 4, 2014	2.60
Skill of the Week: Dimension; Flash Challenge: The artists had two hours to tattoo their assigned bug, either a scorpion or tarantula, while using their own photo as a reference.; Winner: Halo; Elimination Tattoo: The artists' first elimination tattoo has them creating an eye tattoo using the tattooing fundamentals with dimension being the key aspect. Dimension is defined as using shadows and highlights to make a tattoo appear to be popping off the skin. The judges were not happy with most of the work, in fact they withheld the canvas voting, and eliminated the best tattoo position for this episode. In the end the reviews were low, and Ashley quit after having an emotional breakdown; between initial judging and the judge's choice for worst tattoo of the day.; Guest Judge: Tommy Montoya
37	3	"Tatted Ganged"	March 11, 2014	1.97
Skill of the Week: Consistency; Flash Challenge: This challenge required some skill and patience. Working in five teams of three, one artist in a team designed a tattoo, and the other two artists applied the tattoo on a mirrored part of the each twin's body (e.g. one artist tattoos an eagle on the left calf while the other artist tattoos the same eagle on the right calf). The goal is to match each other's tattoo to the original drawing as possible.; Winners: Roland Pacheco, Sausage and Bubba Irwin; Elimination Tattoo: The artists need to be consistent with their geometric tattoos. David went to the medical center on the night before the elimination tattoo to deal with his back injury from a motorcycle accident he had years ago, and it got the best of him.; Guest Judge: Carlos Torres; Best Tattoo of the Day: Sausage; Bottom: Roland Pacheco, David Bell and Bubba Irwin; Eliminated: David Bell
38	4	"Nude & Tattooed"	March 18, 2014	2.24
Skill of the Week: Placement; Flash Challenge: The artists must use their own judgement along with care to decide a design and location to place in order to accentuate the 'flow' of the body.; Winner: Scott Marshall; Elimination Tattoo: Aquatic Tattoo incorporating placement.; Guest Judge: CC Sabathia; Best Tattoo of the Day: Scott Marshall; Bottom: Randy Vollink, Bubba Irwin and Roland Pacheco; Eliminated: Randy Vollink
39	5	"X-Men's Hugh Jackman"	March 25, 2014	2.27
Skill of the Week: Technical Precision; Flash Challenge: The artists create a X-Men-inspired tattoo by creating that incorporates a superpower.; Winner: Matti Hixson Elimination Tattoo: The remaining artists try to bring characters from X-Men: Days of Future Past to life in their portrait tattoos. Matti and Scott duke it out with their Wolverine tattoos. Melissa at first struggled with her Bishop tattoo after the canvas wanted a full body, but managed to work on the bust while also receiving some help from Halo. Some artists fall short with Lydia rushing her Warpath tattoo, and Gentle Jay failing to capture the likeness of young Charles Xavier. The artists and the human canvases both received two big surprises following the critique. Dave reveals a sneak peek from the movie before bringing in one of its stars Hugh Jackman. And unlike the previous episodes, the winner of this elimination tattoo was chosen by the special guest instead of the judges.: Best Tattoo of the Day: Scott Marshall; Bottom: Roland Pacheco and Lydia Bruno; Eliminated: Roland Pacheco
40	6	"2-on-1 Tat-Astrophe"	April 1, 2014	2.08
Skill of the Week: Contrast; Flash Challenge: Inspired the Corona 'Find your Beach' campaign, the artists designed tattoos inspired by their own beach. The winner of this flash challenge received a theme sponsored trip to Mexico.; Winner: Matti Hixson; Elimination Tattoo: In a double elimination, the artists tattoo a Neo-traditional lady or gentleman. Each tattoo was applied in teams on the same canvas at the same time. Designs should complement each other. Keith and King Ruck were unable to finish after their canvas passed out, but the latter tattooed himself. This is the first episode where two artists got eliminated after the Judges' deliberation and the Human Canvas Jury.; Guest Judge: Greg Christian; Best Tattoo of the Day: Sausage; Bottom: Keith Diffenderfer, Bubba Irwin and King Ruck; Eliminated: Keith Diffenderfer and Bubba Irwin
41	7	"Artist Slaughter"	April 8, 2014	1.88
Skill of the Week: Adaptability; Flash Challenge: Apply lettering with an image embedded.; Winner: Halo; Elimination Tattoo: The judges indicated that two artists would be eliminated in this challenge prior to the beginning of the challenge. The artists must design and apply a tattoo on top of another tattoo, essentially erasing the original with their new application. Aspects taken into account during this challenge were line-work, shading, coloring, placement, technicality, and readability.; Guest Judge: Freddy Corbin; Best Tattoo of the Day: Halo; Bottom: Jim Francis, Melissa Monroe, King Ruck and Gentle Jay; Eliminated: Jim Francis and King Ruck
42	8	"Ink Master Explosion"	April 15, 2014	1.91
A fight broke out prior to the flash challenge that saw Kyle lashing out at Núñez for his criticism on him in the last couple episodes. And due to his actions, Kyle was disqualified from the competition. As a result, Sausage had to compete in the Flash Challenge alone.: Skill of the Week: Black and Gray; Flash Challenge: Use black powder gun to burn an image onto a canvas.; Winners: Halo and Scott Marshall; Elimination Tattoo: The artists create a demon that has black and gray shading while using the negative space to accent.; Guest Judge: Rob Zombie; Best Tattoo of the Day: Sausage; Bottom: Lydia Bruno, Melissa Monroe and Halo; Eliminated: Lydia Bruno
43	9	"Fighting Dirty"	April 22, 2014	2.30
Skill of the Week: Detail; Guest Judge: Brandon Rios; Flash Challenge: Create a custom mouth grill with a dremel.; Winner: Scott Marshall; Elimination Tattoo: Design and apply a warrior with details to illustrate the origin without incorporating and era and type of warrior. Prior to the critique, Jay found evidence of tracing in Scott's tattoo, which he recognized from an online source. However, the judges did not take any action after Jay revealed the incident during the critique. Their decision led to a public outcry, with many fans questioning the integrity of the competition and some even accusing the judges of favoring Scott over other artists. The judges decided not to eliminate an artist, and indicated the reason was because no one should be eliminated for giving "a good tattoo". All artists applied satisfactory tattoos, albeit some were better than others.; Best Tattoo of the Day: Matti Hixson; Bottom: Gentle Jay and Melissa Monroe
44	10	"Tag Team Tatt"	April 29, 2014	2.18
Guest Judge: Luke Wessman; Skill of the Week: Flexibility; Elimination Tattoo: Creating a collaboration tattoo with another artist in teams of two, alternating who actually applies the tattoo every hour.; Winners: Scott Marshall and Halo; Face Off Challenge Jay and Melissa had four hours to tattoo Luke Wessman's design.; Eliminated: Gentle Jay
45	11	"Karma's a Bitch"	May 6, 2014	2.51
Skill of the Week: Proportions; Flash Challenge: Create a proportionally accurate sketch of the Statue of Liberty while using their sketch as the only reference to apply a tattoo.; Winner: Halo: Elimination Tattoo: The artists must tattoo a Japanese style snake on the ribs of the client with all aspects of tattooing being applied, however proportion is the primary focus.; 'Guest Judge: Taki; Best Tattoo of the Day: Matti Hixson: Bottom: Halo, Melissa Monroe and Scott Marshall; Eliminated: Melissa Monroe
46	12	"Fight to the Finish"	May 13, 2014	2.27
Skill of the Week: All skills; Elimination Tattoo: The final four compete in a two six-hour tattoo sessions. The first part has them tattooing a breast cancer survivor while the second half involved cover-up tattoos that were done during the competition by the eliminated contestants in the first episode. The canvases in the second half get to choose their artist following the interview. However, Jim's canvas was unsafe to cover-up due to a bad reaction to the ink.; Best Tattoo of the Day: Sausage; Eliminated: Halo
47	13	"Ink Master Live"	May 20, 2014	2.45
Presented in front of a live audience, broadcast live on the parent network, Ink Master Live combines all aspects of tattooing to present the best artist this season. The remaining artists Scott, Matti and Sausage gave it their all for a chance to become Ink Master. During this episode, the judges announced a new format for season 5. Called Ink Master: Rivals and set to air in September 2014, the season will see the return of season 3's Joshua Hibbard and Jason Clay Dunn. It was also said that each artist will bring their own rival. Whether the rival would be from previous seasons artists lineup was not clear.: Winner: Scott Marshall
