= Mike Rubendall =

American tattoo artist

- Born: 20th century Massapequa, New York, U.S.
- Occupation: Tattoo artist
- Known for: Kings Avenue Tattoo

Mike Rubendall (born 20th century) is an American tattoo artist, based primarily in Massapequa, New York, but also in New York City.

His resident studio, Kings Avenue, on the Bowery in Manhattan, was ranked top five in New York City by Inked magazine in 2015, while The Huffington Post named him in 2014 as an artist to follow on Instagram and New York magazine named him one of the top "city inkers". He has been featured in VICE magazine part of Tattoo Age, seasons 2 and 5 of the Ink Master, Tattoo Wars, Prick, was guest editor for Inked, and also featured as part of the Inked spread for Garage Magazine, together with Jeff Koons and Damien Hirst.

Rubendall was born and raised in Massapequa, graduating from Plainedge High School in 1995.

Rubendall learned tattooing from Frank Romano, aged 17. In November 2005, he opened Kings Avenue, which now employs several regular tattooers. After opening, he has tattooed several personalities, including Evan Rachel Wood and Dame Dash.

Rubendall specialises in Japanese, Black and Gray Religious. He has a wait list of approximately a year.
