= Ink Master season 3 =

Ink Master
- Season 3
- Hosted by: Dave Navarro
- Judges: Chris Núñez; Oliver Peck
- No. of contestants: 16
- Winner: Joey Hamilton
- No. of episodes: 13

Release
- Original network: Spike
- Original release: July 16 – October 8, 2013

Season chronology
- ← Previous; Season 2 Next → Season 4

The third season of the tattoo competition series Ink Master premiered on Spike on July 16 and concluded on October 8, 2013, with a total of 13 episodes. The show is hosted and judged by Jane's Addiction guitarist Dave Navarro, with accomplished tattoo artists Chris Núñez and Oliver Peck serving as series regular judges. The winner will receive a $100,000 prize, a feature in Inked magazine and the title of Ink Master.

This season saw the return of season 2 contestant Katherine "Tatu Baby" Flores, who originally finished the competition in 4th place.

The winner of the third season of Ink Master was Joey Hamilton, with Jime Litwalk being the runner-up.

== Judging and ranking ==
This season saw a slight change in the judging process.

=== Judging panel ===
The judging panel is the table of three primary judges, and any guest judges for that episode if applicable.

=== Audience voting ===
Audience voting returned and expanded to include Twitter.

=== Human Canvas Jury ===
Following the elimination tattoo, the human canvases gather to vote for the worst tattoo of the day that'll send one artist to the bottom. While the primary judges have the final say, the weight of the canvas vote does affect the judging panel's final decision, being that it's on their body.

== Contestants ==
Names, experience, and cities stated are at time of filming.

Contestant	Years of experience	Hometown	Outcome
Joey Hamilton	16	Las Vegas, Nevada	Winner
Jime Litwalk	20	Orlando, Florida	Runner-up
Katherine "Tatu Baby" Flores	7	Miami, Florida	3rd place
Kyle Dunbar	20	Flint, Michigan	4th place
Joshua Hibbard	10	Portland, Oregon	5th place
Jason Clay Dunn	18	Montclair, California	6th place
Jackie Jennings	11	Philadelphia, Pennsylvania	7th place
Craig Foster	18	Carrollton, Georgia	8th place
Yovan "E.S." Barraza	16	Bridgeport, Connecticut	9th place
Richard "Made Rich" Parker	5^{1/2}	Queens, New York	10th place
Chris May	16	Dekalb, Illinois	11th place
Ally Lee	9	Santa Cruz, California	12th place
James "Danger" Harvey	8	Sacramento, California	13th place
Maddie la Belle	5	Greensboro, North Carolina	14th place
"Mystical" Mike Paterek	8	Bronx, New York	15th place
Frank McManus	6	New Cumberland, Pennsylvania	16th place

== Contestant progress ==
Contestant	Episode												
Contestant	1	2	3 (Note: There was no Judges' Recall in this episode, nor a winner, therefore every contestant was given a final critique.)	4	5	6 (Note: None of the contestants impressed the judges enough for them to determine a winner.)	7	8	9	10	11	12	13
Joey Hamilton	SAFE	HIGH	HIGH	TOP2	SAFE	SAFE	WIN	HIGH	WIN	SAFE	TOP2	ADV	Winner
Jime Litwalk	HIGH	HIGH	HIGH	SAFE	WIN	SAFE	SAFE	WIN	BTM3	BTM3	WIN	WIN	Runner-up
Tatu Baby	WIN	SAFE	HIGH	SAFE	SAFE	LOW	BTM3	BTM3	HIGH	WIN	BTM3	ADV	Eliminated
Kyle Dunbar	SAFE	SAFE	LOW	SAFE	SAFE	SAFE	HIGH	SAFE	HIGH	BTM3	BTM3	ELIM	Guest
Joshua Hibbard	SAFE	SAFE	LOW	WIN	SAFE	BTM3	BTM3	BTM3	HIGH	HIGH	ELIM		Guest
Jason Clay Dunn	SAFE	SAFE	LOW	BTM2	SAFE	SAFE	SAFE	SAFE	BTM3	ELIM			Guest
Jackie Jennings	SAFE	HIGH	LOW	SAFE	HIGH	BTM3	LOW	SAFE	ELIM				Guest
Craig Foster	HIGH	WIN	HIGH	HIGH	BTM3	SAFE	SAFE	ELIM					Guest
E.S.	SAFE	SAFE	LOW	SAFE	SAFE	SAFE	ELIM						Guest
Made Rich	SAFE	SAFE	LOW	SAFE	BTM3	ELIM							Guest
Chris May	SAFE	BTM3	LOW	LOW	ELIM								Guest
Ally Lee	SAFE	SAFE	LOW	ELIM									Guest
James Danger	SAFE	SAFE	ELIM										
Maddie la Belle	BTM3	BTM3	ELIM										Guest
Mystical Mike	BTM3	ELIM											Guest
Frank McManus	ELIM												Guest

The contestant won Ink Master.
The contestant was the runner-up.
The contestant was eliminated during the finale.
The contestant advanced to the finale.
The contestant won Best Tattoo of the Day.
The contestant was among the top.
The contestant received positive critiques.
The contestant received negative critiques.
The contestant was in the bottom.
The contestant was in the bottom and voted Worst Tattoo of the Day by the Human Canvas Jury.
The contestant was eliminated from the competition.
The contestant was voted Worst Tattoo of the Day and was eliminated from the competition.
The contestant was eliminated in the Flash Challenge.
The contestant returned as a guest for that episode.

== Episodes ==
No. overall	No. in season	Title	Original release date	US viewers (millions)
22	1	"Baby Got Back"	July 16, 2013	2.41
Skill of the Week: Flexibility; Flash Challenge: Using only a single needle tattoo machine, the 16 artists go behind bars as they tattoo prisoners for 90 minutes.; Winner: Joey Hamilton: Elimination Tattoo: The prisoners from the Flash Challenge are back. They are revealed to not be convicts at that point in time, however they were ex-convicts. This time, they want to get a cover-up on one of their respective tattoos. Joey throws a curveball by giving all the artists the same prisoners. Maddie is picked by the Human Canvas Jury as the worst tattoo of the day, and Mike ends up in the bottom, but Frank's poor tattoo sends him home.; Best Tattoo of the Day: Tatu Baby; Bottom 3: Mystical Mike, Maddie la Belle and Frank McManus; Human Canvas Jury's Pick: Maddie la Belle; Eliminated: Frank McManus
23	2	"Thrills for Grills"	July 23, 2013	1.96
Skill of the Week: Precision; Flash Challenge: Working in teams of three, the artists had 3 hours to draft and create a custom automotive grill plate for their assigned car. As winner of the first Elimination Tattoo, Tatu Baby assigned the teams.; Guest Judge: Chris Johnson; Winners: Jackie Jennings, Joey Hamilton and James Danger; Elimination Challenge: The artists create a realistic medical anatomical tattoo. One human canvas wanted an anatomical heart in the armpit. Jackie, Joey and James all decided to give the canvas to Josh. The anatomy realism from Mystical Mike's tattoo was not present and textures failed to produce, resulting in the Human Canvas Jury picking him, which resulted in his elimination, but not before Mike got into some beef with his fellow competitors.; Best Tattoo of the Day: Craig Foster; Bottom 3: Maddie la Belle, Mystical Mike and Chris May; Human Canvas Jury's Pick: Mystical Mike; Eliminated: Mystical Mike
24	3	"Fire & Lace"	July 30, 2013	1.85
Skill of the Week: Texture; Flash Challenge: The artists had five minutes to find a sexy garter belt before they head back to the shop where they had four hours to tattoo their chosen belt. Dave reveals a major twist to this challenge that the artist with the worst tattoo will be eliminated from the competition. Although Tatu Baby is close to getting sent home, Maddie is sent packing.; Winner: Joshua Hibbard; Eliminated: Maddie la Belle; Elimination Tattoo: The artists must try to bring texture in their phoenix tattoos. James Danger's canvas did not see eye-to-eye with him. She walked out, resulting in no canvas for Danger to showcase his ability upon. The judges interviewed both Danger and the canvas to see what the problem was; after which it was determined Danger could not handle the nagging personality of his canvas. The judges agreed that being an Ink Master, one would need to know how to instill confidence in their client, and should have the skills to do what is requested. They also factored in his Flash Challenge tattoo of a leg garter which was poorly detailed and rough in different areas to reinforce their decision to eliminate him. This is the only episode where no one got Best Tattoo of the Day, no Canvas Jury, and no Judge's Recall due to the incident Danger had with his canvas.; Guest Judge: Tony Hundahl Eliminated: James Danger
25	4	"Elysium Challenge"	August 6, 2013	2.08
Skill of the Week: Lines; Guest Judge: Seth Ciferri; Flash Challenge: The final twelve head to the Museum of Moving Image where they are treated to a sneak peek of Elysium. The movie serves as inspiration for the next Flash Challenge as all of the artists, except Tatu Baby and Ally who both didn't get to do the challenge because they didn't assemble their machine in the time limit, had 90 minutes to assemble their machine before tattooing a bar code. The machines were created by this episode's guest judge Seth Ciferri.; Winner: Craig Foster: Elimination Challenge: Celtic tattoos take over in this Elimination Tattoo. Everyone is shocked when Joshua wins "Best Tattoo of the Day", while Ally & Jason end up at the bottom of the pack. In the end, Ally is sent home after being selected by the Human Canvas Jury.; Best Tattoo of the Day: Joshua Hibbard Bottom 2: Jason Clay Dunn and Ally Lee: Human Canvas Jury's Pick: Ally Lee; Eliminated: Ally Lee
26	5	"Baby Beats Down"	August 13, 2013	2.12
Skill of the Week: Values; Flash Challenge: The artists had four hours to a human canvas' scar into an evenly-shaded tattoo.; Winner: Tatu Baby; Elimination Tattoo: The artists create a Dia de los Muertos tattoo. The judges were not very impressed this challenge across the board, and the results were the opposite of their expectations. Chris, Craig, Jason, and Made Rich's tattoos were overly dark; with Craig drawing additional criticism for mixing black and white ink for the gray shading (a faux pas in the industry). Tatu Baby executed a good design but failed on detail. Joshua, Joey, and ES came up short on their usage of black. Jackie and Jime were the only artists who got praise from the judges. Chris ended up having to close shop.; Guest Judge: Chuey Quintanar; Best Tattoo of the Day: Jime Litwalk; Bottom 3: Made Rich, Craig Foster and Chris May; Human Canvas Jury's Pick: Craig Foster; Eliminated: Chris May
27	6	"Animal Instinct"	August 20, 2013	1.79
Skill of the Week: Detail; Flash Challenge: As winner of the last Elimination Tattoo, Jime assigned all the skulls containing a random animal consisting of a leopard, Asian water, geonide monkey, porcupine, tiger, tortoise, owl, Albino Burmese python, vulture and zebra. The artists had 30 minutes to sketch the pattern that was given to them. They then had two hours airbrush their concept onto a model.; Winner: Kyle Dunbar; Elimination Tattoo: Asian tattoos exposed all the artists' weakness in a brutal Elimination Tattoo. The judges announced that there is no best tattoo of the day since most of the tattoos did not meet the expectations.; Guest Judge: Troy Denning; Guest Canvas: Frank Trigg and Jimmy Smith; Bottom: Made Rich, Joshua Hibbard and Jackie Jennings; Human Canvas Jury's Pick: Joshua Hibbard; Eliminated: Made Rich
28	7	"Monumental Mistakes"	August 27, 2013	1.86
Skill of the Week: Dimension; Flash Challenge: The judges surprise the remaining artists with a rise around New York City on a tour bus. Each artist had two hours to design two tattoos for Dave with one "good luck" design and one "bad luck." Two artists with the strongest tattoos will face-off. Jason and Tatu Baby had 90 minutes to tattoo their respective designs on Dave.; Winner: Jason Clay Dunn; Elimination Tattoo: The artists create a large tattoo depicting a realistic landmark.; Guest Judge: Nikko Hurtado; Best Tattoo of the Day: Joey Hamilton; Bottom: ES, Tatu Baby and Joshua Hibbard; Human Canvas Jury's Pick: Tatu Baby; Eliminated: ES
29	8	"Baby Don't Go"	September 3, 2013	1.84
Skill of the Week: Proportion; Flash Challenge: One artist had one hour to tattoo a design for a fellow artist to artistically apply to another artist. The person chosen to tattoo an artist must receive a tattoo from the person they are tattooing. As winner of the last Elimination Tattoo, Joey assigned all the teams. The teams will then have four hours to tattoo both of their respective designs. The winning team receives a fully paid trip to Germany to visit the Jägermeister facility and receive a private tour. The teams were Tatu Baby and Jime Litwalk, Joey and Craig Foster, Joshua Hibbard and Kyle Dunbar, and Jackie Jennings and Jason Clay Dunn.; Winners: Joshua Hibbard and Kyle Dunbar; Finale Tattoo: The artists tattooed pinups on an unusual canvas. Turns out that they are the contestants from Season 2. Each artist, except Kyle and Josh who both chose their own canvas, will consult with all the canvases for five minutes. The canvases picked the skull containing the number on the bottom that will determine the order of who gets to choose their artist. During the elimination, Tatu Baby mentioned she was ready to drop out because of embarrassment from poor work over the past few episodes. She was disappointed in herself, however the judges convinced her to stay on board if she was not voted out. Joshua and Craig were also emotional about the degree of challenges they faced, and the results thus far were not what they expected. The judges' decision to send Craig home shocked Jime and Tatu Baby and became one of the most controversial eliminations in Ink Master history.; Guest Judge: NaVorro Bowman; Guest Canvas: Sarah Miller, Clint Cummings, Kay Kutta, Ron Givens, Mark Matthews, Cee Jay Jones, TJ Hal and Nick D'Angelo; Best Tattoo of the Day: Jime Litwalk; Human Canvas Jury's Pick: Joshua Hibbard; Eliminated: Craig Foster
30	9	"Skulls & Villains"	September 10, 2013	2.23
Skill of the Week: Consistency; Flash Challenge: Before the flash challenge at the moment of Craig's elimination, everyone was filled with emotions to see Josh safe and Craig eliminated. At the Ruffus D. Hall, the artists had three hours to carve a design onto a skull.; Winner: Joshua Hibbard; Elimination Challenge: The artists must bring a DC Comics villain to life by using consistency to make the character look like it was ripped from straight from the comics. Darkseid, Bane, Two Face, Poison Ivy, Deathstroke, The Joker and Catwoman. Jime took his Poison Ivy tattoo in a different direction and made it his own way while Jackie reversed Two-Face's appearance in her tattoo.; Guest Judge: Greg Capullo; Best Tattoo of the Day: Joey Hamilton; Bottom: Jackie Jennings, Jime Litwalk, Jason Clay Dunn; Human Canvas Jury's Pick: Jime Litwalk; Eliminated: Jackie Jennings
31	10	"Eyes of the Beholder"	September 17, 2013	2.07
Skill of the Week: Accuracy; Flash Challenge: The remaining artists head to Coney Island where they had 60 minutes to tattoo a design onto the canvas' eyelids.; Winner: Jime Litwalk; Elimination Challenge: The artist must use a pic of the live person as the reference in their portrait tattoo before they tattoo the canvas the next day. One canvas wanted a portrait of Dave Navarro.; Guest Judge: Corey Miller; Best Tattoo of the Day: Tatu Baby; Bottom: Kyle Dunbar, Jime Litwalk and Jason Clay Dunn; Human Canvas Jury's Pick: Kyle Dunbar; Eliminated: Jason Clay Dunn
32	11	"Heroes and Heads"	September 24, 2013	2.30
Skill of the Week: Finesse; Flash Challenge: The final five had one hour to engrave personalized dog tags for veterans and families of fallen soldiers or veteran service. The challenge is connected to the Intrepid Fallen Heroes Fund.; Winner: Jime Litwalk; Elimination Challenge: The artists' get inside the human canvas' head by tattooing a head design with no style limitation.; Guest Judge: Twig; Best Tattoo of the Day: Jime Litwalk; Bottom: Tatu Baby, Joshua Hibbard and Kyle Dunbar; Human Canvas Jury's Pick: Tatu Baby; Eliminated: Joshua Hibbard
33	12	"Enduring the Pain"	October 1, 2013	2.33
Skill of the Week: All aspects of tattooing combined.; Elimination Tattoo: The final four fight for a spot in the finale as they must tattoo a design that was created by one of the guest judges, handpicked by Peck and Nunez that tests each artists' weaknesses. Peck chose Chuey Quintanar's tattoo to Jime, and gave Kyle Seth Ciferri's design. Nunez handed Tatu Baby Troy Denning's design where she must create a Japanese tattoo. Corey Miller's black and grey design went to Joey. Each artist must apply their tattoo to the same canvas at the same time. In a secondary challenge, each artist must apply a 6-hour custom tattoo of their own creation onto a dedicated canvas. Despite Kyle's elimination, he along with the eliminated contestant from this season will be determined by the online audience before the two most voted artists face off in the finale for a spot on season 4.; Best Tattoo of the Day: Jime Litwalk Second Artist Advancing to the Finale: Joey Hamilton Third Artist Advancing to the Finale: Tatu Baby: Eliminated: Kyle Dunbar
34	13	"Ink Master Live: The Epic Finale"	October 8, 2013	2.70
Elimination Challenge: The three remaining artist must apply a tattoo incorporating each skill tested on throughout the season. They have the flexibility of location of the canvas, studio to apply and design of their application. Other than the other standard rules, the artists each have 35 cumulative hours to complete their work.; The live 2-hour finale started with a quick recap. It transitioned into the 2 artists who received the highest number of audience votes Chris May and Kyle Dunbar. These two artists had the opportunity to apply a tattoo live in a battle to be the returning contestant for Season 4. The time limit was 6 hours to complete the tattoo. Maddie la Belle was excluded from the voting due to pregnancy. And James Danger was also excluded from the voting process due to personal reasons. In addition, he was not present during the finale, making him the only contestant to not return to the live finale as a guest. The remaining artists and finalists were brought on stage, and the judges offered the chance to discuss their reasons for participating in Ink Master. Josh was given solemn advice by other contestants and judges regarding his attitude. The canvases throughout the season were also given a voice, and some returned to the finale to make comments which ranged from praise to arguments with the artists and judges. The judges decided to produce the vote tally for the various artist levels of popularity during the live finale. They also reviewed some of the controversial eliminations and season tattoos. The person with the highest number of votes throughout the season received a guest artist spot at Peck's and Nunez's respective shops. By this time in the episode, the time limit for Chris and Kyle's tattoos had expired. Kyle's tattoo was liked by the judges, with the one criticism of needing to use more black. Chris's piece received a positive review as well, and both artists were asked why this quality of work was not produced during the season. Chosen solely by the audience, the winner and recipient of a season 4 contestant seat was Kyle with over 170,000 votes. The show lead to interviewing the three finalists, starting with Tatu Baby. She discussed her challenges and thoughts during the season, and was glad she did not quit. Joey Hamilton expressed his joy to have made it to the finale and in classic competitive fashion, compared himself to the other two finalists. Jime rounded out the trio with his comments and expression of excitement. Tatu Baby's back tattoo was first up: a partially nude Native American woman with a wolf. The judges found it satisfactory overall, but had issues on its placement and continuity, and pointed out some areas that should have been tighter. Joey's design was a partially nude mermaid in an aquatic environment on a leg. The design was missing some contrast and would have benefitted from additional black to bring out the emotion and depth, but the time spent showed through. Jime did a full chest/stomach tattoo of a traditional battle royale; however it appeared dull and lacked punch. The coloring could have been better, and the background overcrowded and overshadowed his primary artwork. Despite a rebuttal, the judges' criticism remained, and he was chastised for not sticking to his area of expertise for this open challenge.: Winner: Joey Hamilton; Runner-Up: Jime Litwalk; Third Place: Tatu Baby
