= Trash polka =

Tattoo style

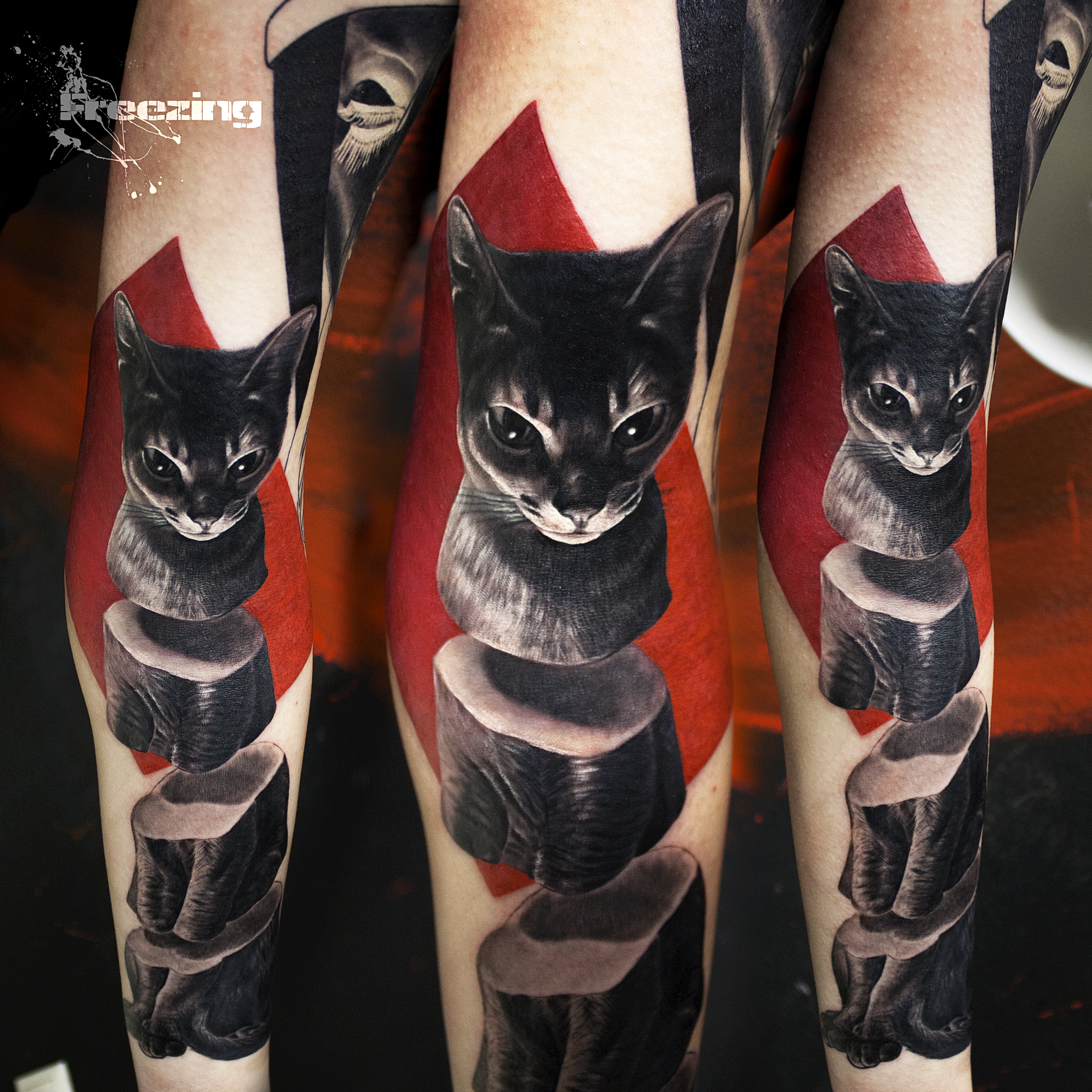
Combination of photorealistic surrealistic motifs with abstract elements in black and red

Trash Polka is a tattoo style created by tattoo artists Simone Pfaff and Volker Merschky in Würzburg, Germany. The characteristics of Trash Polka tattoos can be a combination of naturalistic, surrealistic, and photorealistic motifs with graphic, lettering, and calligraphic elements primarily in black & red.

== Technique ==
Trash polka is a mixed media form of tattooing that is created with various, non-limited components. Detailed photo-realistic portraits can be displayed in conjunction with graphic elements such as large black areas, brush strokes, and geometric or abstract shapes. The tattoos are traditionally in black and red, but other colors can be used as well. The style is often cited for its use of color contrasts, such as complementary contrast, that create an optical effect. Abstract designs and realistic motifs are key elements of the tattoo style. It is common for lettering to be included in the tattoos with distinctive varieties of fonts. The majority of original Trash Polka tattoos are done as large scale pieces in order to suit the motifs and elements.

== History ==
The term 'Trash Polka' was created in 1998 by Volker Merschky and Simone Pfaff at Buena Vista Tattoo Club in Würzburg. The artists originally gave their work the name 'Realistic Trash Polka' because they combined realistic images (Realistic), with graphic, lettering and other artistic layers (Trash). They chose to use it in a musical sense, combining everything together like a composition (Polka). After some time, they shortened the name to Trash Polka because they did not want to set rules for their style. Merschky has referred to their style as a “combination of realism and trash; the nature and the abstract; technology and humanity; past, present, and future; opposites that they are trying to urge into a creative dance to harmony and rhythm in tune with the body." The initial challenges were two-fold: customers wanting to get tattoos in this style were scarce, as there was nothing similar to this style at the time.

=== Volker Merschky and Simone Pfaff ===
After Merschky studied interior design and Pfaff worked as a graphic designer, they both began tattooing. They are also painters, photographers and musicians. The couple are known to have broken the stereotypes of the classic German tattoo style. They have mixed different styles together such as realistic and graphic tattoos. For example, they would cross a portrait with black lines or insert lettering over a photographic image. They would use meaningful words or bold colour strokes to create powerful visual representations. This created vibrant contrast on the skin and made the tattoos stand out.

Over time 'Trash Polka' began to receive global recognition & appeared in articles in tattoo magazines, books and websites. Merschky and Pfaff said "We need open minded customers who can lay their hands off and trust us", but they admitted that many people get offended. The process is usually as follows: A customer comes into the studio, tells them their thematic idea and possible keywords from a song, poem or quote that they want included. Merschky and Pfaff then sit down on the computer, create two to three designs and presents it to the customer. They explained their thought process; "If we only did what people want, we would never have been able to develop anything new," says Merschky. Some of the elements that they use in the tattoos today, they painted years ago. From then on, Merschky and Pfaff influenced many tattoo artists around the world with their style. First in Europe, then Russia, Asia, South America, Australia and in the United States as well.

==== Trash Polka Trademark ====
The name 'Trash Polka' is a word creation and registered trademark by Volker Merschky and Simone Pfaff.

==== Literature ====
Books

- Lal Hardy: The Mammoth Book of Tattoo Art
- Tattooisme 2 by Chris Coppola, Frédéric Claquin & Kitiza
- La Veine Graphique Vol. 2
- Day of the Dead Tattoo Artwork Collection by Edgar Hoill
- Black Tattoo Art 2
- The World Atlas of Tattoo by Anna Felicity Friedman
- Tattoo Handbook 2 by Dimitri Hk, Steph D., & Benjo San
- Cranial Visions
- Tattoo Prodigies 2
- Tattooing Über Alles Vol. 1 The Germans
- Back Piece Tattoo

Magazines

- TattooFest (Poland) September 2008
- Tätowiermagazin (Germany) October 2006
- Total Tattoo Magazine (Great Britain) April 2009
- Tattoo Burst Magazine (Japan) September 2009 & July 2012
- Custom Tattooz (Australia) August 2009
- Skin Deep Tattoo Magazine (United Kingdom) October 2010

Museum Catalogs

- Tattoo Forever Rome- Gangemi Editore International Publishing
- Time Tattoo Art Today – Somerset House London – Tattoo Life Production
- Tätowierung in der Kunst – Museum Villa Rot Burgrieden- Stuttgart

Music: Dobbs Dead

Dobbs Dead is a music project done by the two artists. Their music, which combines alternative music with American folk / country music with European influences, is characterized by a dark, melancholy feel that they call "post-mortem folk" music. Pfaff played the pump organ and Merschky the guitar / harp / drums, and vocals were done by both of them. They had finished their debut album Birth in the fall of 2010, which include 11 songs of original compositions. With their music project, they also performed live regularly with changing band members.

==== Art exhibitions ====
- Museum of Contemporary Art, Rome 'Tattoo Forever' 2 June – 24 July 2016
- Museum of Art and Business, Hamburg 13 February – 6 September 2015
- Art gallery, Fürth 10 October – 8 November 2015
- Somerset House, London 'Time: Tattoo Art Today' 3 July – 5 October 2014
- Academy of Würzburg/Schweinfurt Faculty of Design ' Trash Polka' 17 June – 9 July 2014
- Museum Villa Rot, Stuttgart 'Gestochen Scharf' 24 March – 28 July 2013
- Gallery 59 / rue de Rivoli, Paris 'Menschenkinder' 13–25 September 2011

==== Websites ====
- Trash Polka
- Trash Polka Tattoos
- Facebook
- Instagram
- Tattoodo

==== Videos ====
- Trash Polka: Talking Trash | Adobe Creative Cloud | Adobe
- Volker Merschky & Simone Pfaff / Realistic Trash Polka
- Volko Merschky & Simone Pfaff / Realistic Trash Polka – Tattoo Online Seminar
