= Oliver Peck =

American tattoo artist, restaurateur, and reality television personality

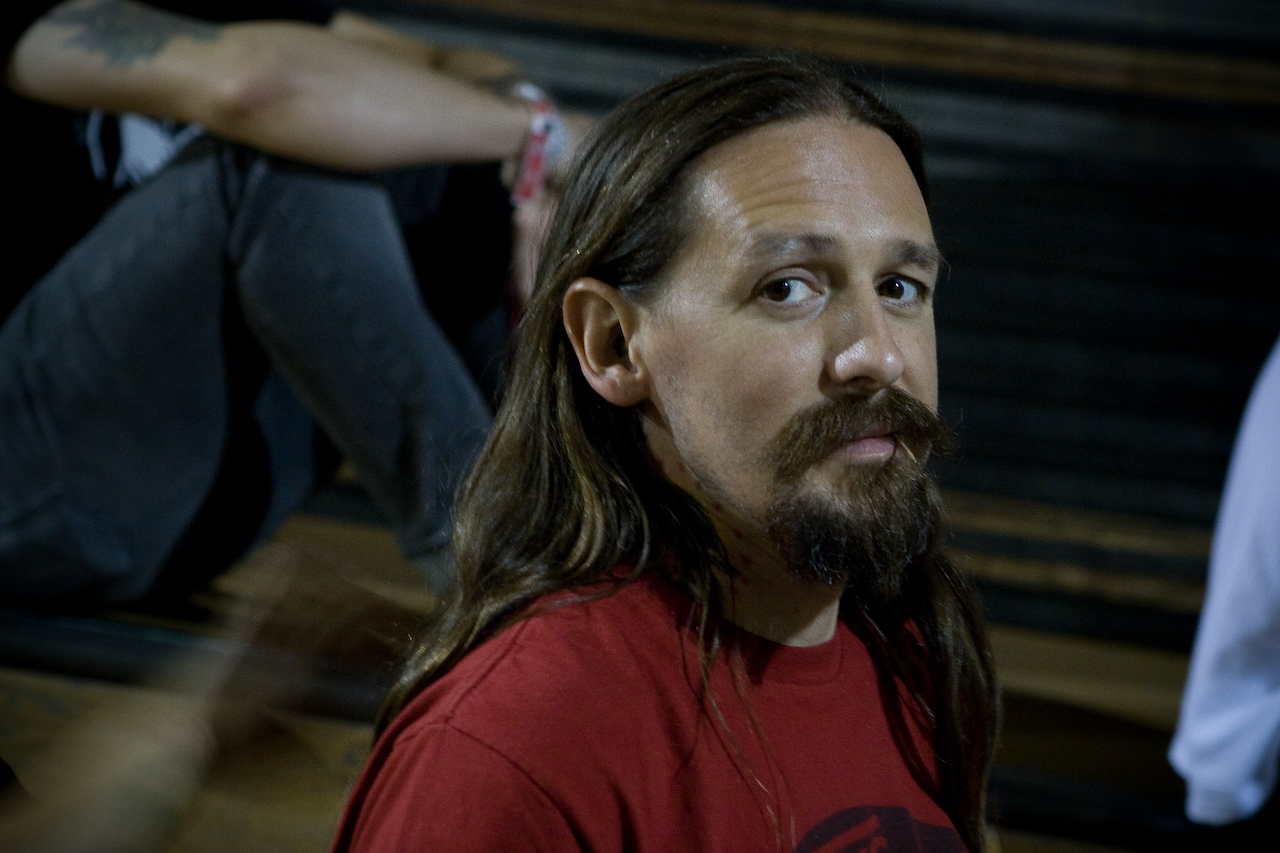
- Peck at a Vans book release party in 2009
- Born: July 29, 1971 (age 54); Dallas, Texas, U.S.
- Occupations: Tattoo artist; reality television personality; restaurateur
- Known for: Ink Master judge
- Spouse: Kat Von D (m. 2003; div. 2007)

Oliver Peck (born July 29, 1971) is an American tattoo artist, restaurateur, and reality television personality. Along with guitarist Dave Navarro and tattoo artist Chris Nunez, he was a judge on the competition reality television show Ink Master for seasons 1 through 13. Known for his American traditional style tattoos, he is co-owner of Elm Street Tattoo in Dallas, Texas and owner of True Tattoo in Hollywood, California. His restaurant Tiki Loco was located in Deep Ellum, Dallas, before shutting in early 2023.

== Career ==
Peck started giving himself and his friends tattoos at age 17. In 1991, at age 19, he started professionally tattooing.

In January 2012, the first season of Ink Master premiered, with Peck, Dave Navarro, and Chris Nunez as judges. Peck continued on as a judge through season 13 in 2020. During season 13, photos of Peck in blackface circulated on the internet after gossip site TMZ published them. One photo showed Peck wearing "brown face paint, an Afro wig and a superhero costume with the letter "N" on it." Peck announced on Instagram he would be leaving the show, stating, "The offensive photos of me which recently surfaced from many years ago can only be a distraction to the amazing show I have loved being a part of and its many talented artists."

Peck is credited with creating the ritual of offering $13 tattoos on Friday the 13th. In 1995, he threw a tattooing party that lasted 24 hours to celebrate the day, and the trend took off. Peck stated, "I definitely wasn’t the first person to do it, the number 13 on the Friday the 13th", though he is credited with popularizing the event. Elm Street Tattoo generally expects about 1,200 customers for the event each year.

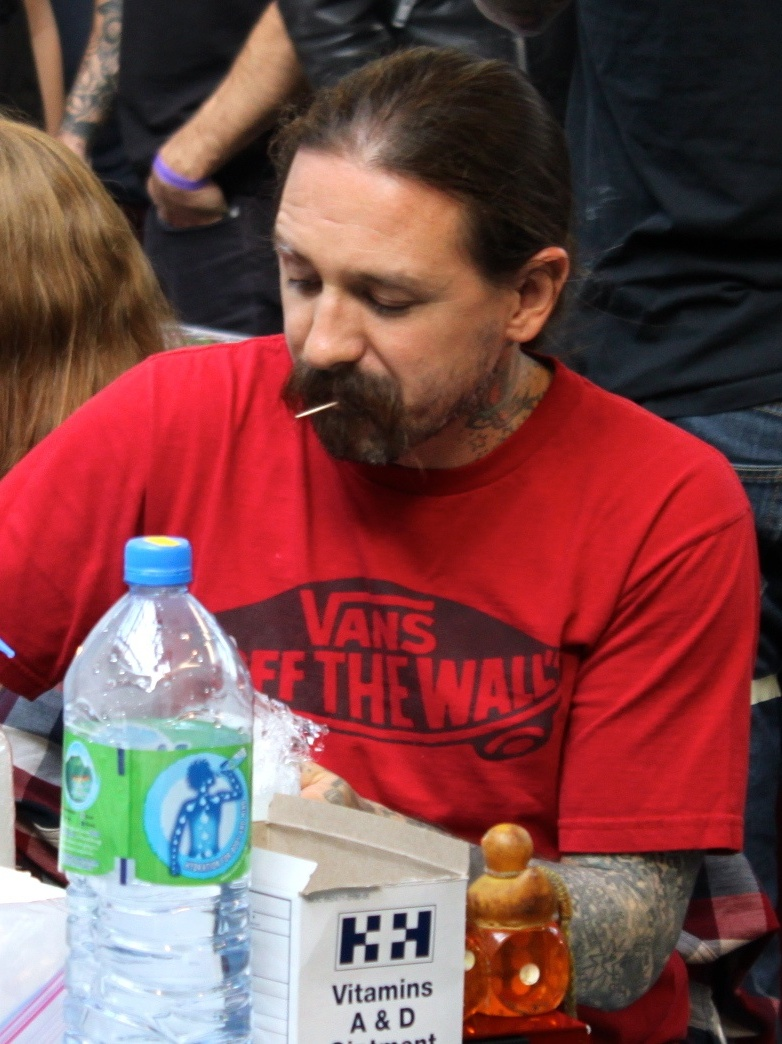
Peck at the London Tattoo Convention in 2013

Peck broke the world record for tattooing the most tattoos in a 24 hour period in June 2008 when he tattooed the number 13 on 415 different people at his Elm Street Tattoo shop in Dallas. The record was previously held by Peck's ex-wife and fellow tattoo artist Kat Von D. The record was listed in the Guinness Book of World Records. Peck introduced "tattoo roulette" at Elm Street Tattoo in 2018 (a concept that has existed since as far back as 2007), where a client picks a random flash tattoo from a gumball machine. Inked Magazine wrote, "Certainly we've gotten some arbitrary tattoos on a whim, but allowing a random machine to pick a design to be permanently tattooed on your body is just nuts."

=== Tattoo reception ===
In 2015, Peck won "Best Tattoo Artist" in the Dallas Observer Best of Dallas contest. In 2017, Pete Freedman of Central Track wrote Peck is "...an internationally renowned tattooer for years now..." That same year, the OC Weekly wrote, Peck is "one of the most visible and respected tattooers in the world." In 2018, Andrew Braca of the Waxahachie Daily Light called Peck "world-renowned". That same year, Tattoo Journal wrote, "Oliver Peck tattoos are famous for their classic American style and theme and the attention to detail."

=== Tiki Loco restaurant ===
In October 2018, Peck opened Tiki Loco, a "coffee shop and vegan restaurant hybrid" in Deep Ellum, Dallas, Texas. The restaurant, located on Elm Street, took over the space held by previous restaurant Zini's Pizza. The restaurant is a combination of Hawaiian and Mexican, and serves coffee, fresh-pressed juices, shaved ice, smoothies, and vegan tacos. The marinades and spice blends are both made in house. D Magazine writer Catherine Downes characterized Tiki Loco as a "smash hit" and stated they have good food. The leftover produce not used in the restaurant is distributed to hospitals in the area. The restaurant closed because of increasing operating costs and decreased foot traffic in early January 2023.

== Personal life ==
Peck resides in Dallas, Texas. He married fellow tattoo artist Kat Von D in 2003. They divorced in 2007, with Peck stating, "She [was unfaithful] to me, got messed up and left me... I don't think anything with her will last."

Peck enjoys riding and collecting Harley Davidson motorcycles.
