= Chris Núñez =

American tattoo artist, television personality, graffiti artist and entrepreneur

Christopher Núñez (born April 11, 1973) is an American tattoo artist, television personality, and entrepreneur. He was a judge on the reality television show Ink Master.

== Early life ==
Of Cuban descent, he grew up in Miami, Florida. Núñez had always been drawn to art, and began painting graffiti as a teenager, which he claims his father supported as long as it was an image and not just Núñez's name. Soon he discovered tattooing and obtained an apprenticeship at a local tattoo shop. His father died when Núñez was 18, leading to him rebelling during his late teens and early twenties. Núñez's first tattoos, which he got at age 16, were of his parents' names.

== Career ==
After being a graffiti artist, Núñez switched to tattooing, though even after opening a tattoo shop with friends, he continued to do part-time construction work. He and Ami James later opened Love Hate Tattoos on Miami Beach. Love Hate Tattoos (official site).

He was a cast member of the TLC network's reality show Miami Ink, and later became a judge on the Spike network's reality competition, Ink Master, in which tattoo artists compete in challenges assessing their tattoo and related artistic skills.

He is a partner in the media corporation Ridgeline Empire, which operates the subsidiaries Ink Skins and Upset Gentlemen and an animation studio with two animated series in development as of 2014: Hoodbrats and Toothians.
