= Inked (magazine) =

Tattoo magazine

- July 2022 cover featuring Demi Lovato
- Categories: Lifestyle media, digital media
- Frequency: 4 per year
- Publisher: Darrin Austin
- Country: United States
- Based in: New York City
- Language: English
- Website: inkedmag.com
- ISSN: 1555-8630

Inked is a tattoo lifestyle digital and print media company that bills itself as the outsiders' insider media. Covering music, fashion, art, sports and the rest of the lifestyle of the tattooed, Inked, like Vice, has evolved from newsstands to a large-scale digital media company. Tattooed women like Kat Von D, Avril Lavigne, Diablo Cody, Eve and Malin Akerman have appeared on Inked's cover. Among the celebrities who have sat down with Inked are Ozzy Osbourne, Lil Pump, Tracy Morgan, Slash, Kid Cudi and Billie Joe Armstrong. Inked also covers tattoo artists; they immortalize the best in their Icon feature through which the likes of Don Ed Hardy, Horiyoshi III and Ami James have been honored.

== History and profile ==
In 2006, the magazine was purchased by Downtown Media Group. Pinchazo Publishing Group Inc acquired Inked in August 2007. The company hired creative director Todd Weinberger to redesign the magazine, then brought on editor Jason Buhrmester. Upon Burhmester's departure in the spring of 2010 Rocky Rakovic was tapped as Editor. Rakovic brought in celebrity contributors like Adam Levine, Jessica White and Adam Goldberg. Photographers such as Terry Richardson, Ellen Stagg and Warwick Saint have shot for Inked.

In 2022, Inked was purchased by Inked Holding, LLC., an entity owned by businessmen and philanthropists Darrin Austin and Jason Miller, and was subsequently transformed to align with more modern mainstream tattoo enthusiasts, including changes in both its editorial and visual presentation.

The company also maintains a substantial eCommerce and licensing business.
