= Stéphane Malenou =

Cameroonian professional boxer

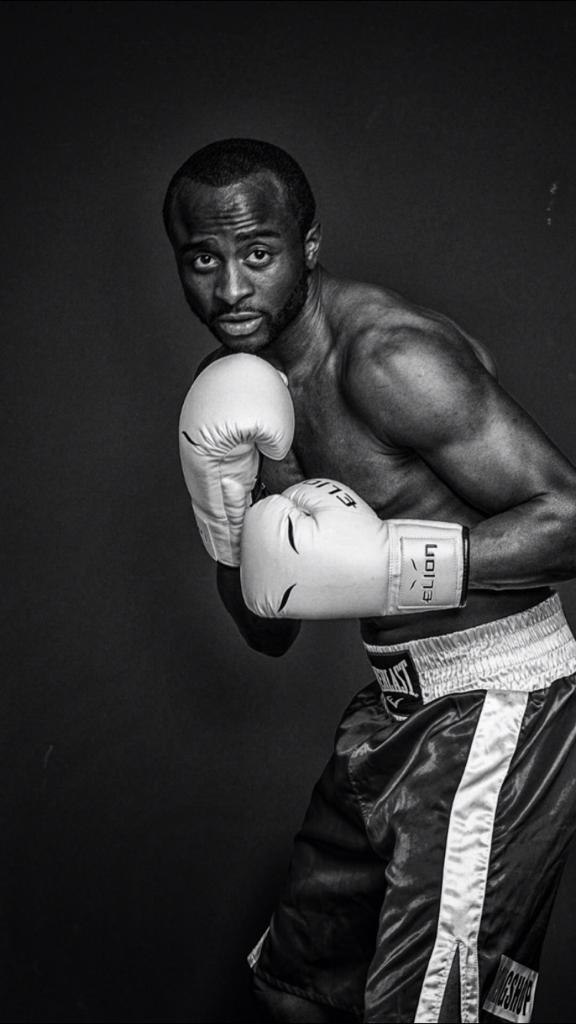
Stéphane Malenou Stéphane "The Outsider" Malenou
- Born: Stéphane Malenou Chibonsou; June 30, 1983 (age 42); Douala, Cameroon
- Other names: The Predator, The Outsider
- Occupations: Boxer, Boxing Coach, Entrepreneur
- Years active: 2003–2019
- Children: 2

Stéphane Malenou Chibonsou (born 30 June 1983) is a Cameroonian professional boxer, boxing coach, and entrepreneur. He competed as a super welterweight from 2003 to 2019. After his boxing career, he founded Le Ring by Outsider, a boxing academy in Montreal, Canada.

== Early life and amateur career ==
Malenou was born in Douala, Cameroon, and is one of six siblings. He began boxing at age 12 under coach Félix Kameni Tchatchoua, who became a mentor. He attended General Leclerc High School and the Institut National de la Jeunesse et des Sports (INJS) in Yaoundé, where he developed his boxing skills.

As an amateur, Malenou represented Cameroon at the 2002 Amateur World Championships in Kazakhstan. Under the guidance of Professor Pierre Edmond Banga, Cameroon's National Technical Director, he received a French Cooperation Scholarship which enabled his participation in the tournament.

== Professional career ==
=== France (2003–2007) ===
Malenou began his professional career in France in November 2003. In June 2004, he won the Lightweight title at the French International Cup in Clément, France. The following year, he advanced to the finals of the same tournament as a welterweight, finishing as a finalist.

=== United States (2008–2016) ===
In 2008, Malenou relocated to New York City, training at Gleason's Gym in Brooklyn under manager Damon de Berry. He later moved to Las Vegas, Nevada, where he trained at the Mayweather Boxing Club and received guidance from Floyd Mayweather Sr. His career in this period was hampered by hand injuries, which required surgeries in 2015 and 2016.

=== Canada (2017–2019) ===
Malenou fought in Montreal in June 2017 and in Toronto in 2019 before being inactive from professional competition.

== Fighting style and influences ==
Malenou was known for his aggressive style and nickname "The Predator." He cited Floyd Mayweather Jr. as a major influence on his defensive technique.

== Post-boxing career and business ==
Malenou founded Le Ring by Outsider, a boxing academy in Montreal, Quebec, Canada. The academy focuses on training athletes of all levels and promotes boxing for personal development. He also established the Le Ring Association, a non-profit organization with a social and humanitarian mission, operating in Montreal, France, and Cameroon.
