= Look Ahead America =

American political organization

- Formation: August 12, 2017; 8 years ago
- Type: 501(c)(3) organization
- Tax ID no.: 82-1645970
- Headquarters: Washington, D.C.
- Executive Director: Matt Braynard
- Director of Research: Ian Camacho
- National Field Director: Julie Fisher
- Website: https://lookaheadamerica.org/

Look Ahead America is a conservative political advocacy group and nonprofit formed by former Trump campaign staffer Matt Braynard in August 2017. The group's stated goals are to identify working-class and rural voters, to increase voter registration and mobilization, local community activism, and to advocate for increased transparency in the voting process such as forensic investigations of fraudulent vote claims and equipping poll watchers with cameras.

Since 2021, Look Ahead America has expanded their advocacy to include civil rights. The group has organized public rallies and other activities defending the civil rights of prisoners and arrestees at the 2021 Capitol attack.

== History ==
Look Ahead America applied for tax exemption on May 19, 2017, with a posting date of August 16 of the same year, giving the organization a 501(c)(3) tax-exempt status.

The organization's tax exemption was revoked on May 15, 2020, with the revocation posted on August 11, 2020.

In November 2020, Matt Braynard launched the Voter Integrity Fund, later renamed the Voter Integrity Project. When crowdfunding website GiveSendGo was hacked, it was revealed that the Voter Integrity Project raised nearly $700,000 in donations on the site, surpassing a goal of $500,000. The leftover funds from this venture were rolled into Look Ahead America, which officially relaunched on January 20, 2021. With the rolled over funds, Look Ahead America had a total of $793,000 in donations for 2021. The organization reapplied for tax exempt status, which was retroactively approved as of December 10, 2021.

== "J6" activities ==
Look Ahead America has taken a prominent role in supporting the January 6 defendants, promoting a nationwide program of vigils, maintaining a database of court cases, and launching a job board to link January Sixers with sympathetic employers.

Look Ahead America held a series of rallies titled "Justice for J6" in support of the individuals who were arrested and charged for the January 6th riot at the US Capitol. Prior to the first rally, Look Ahead America had sent a letter to the Department of Justice and Federal Bureau of Investigation on January 29, 2021. The letter requested that these departments drop all charges against non-violent offenders, citing their lack of mens rea for the justification of charges.

Braynard paired with Cara Castronuova of Citizens Against Political Persecution (CAPP), and—on behalf of both organizations—filed a formal complaint with the United Nations Human Rights Committee regarding the prisoners. Braynard and Castronuova also worked together to hold rallies in Washington, D.C. and in 17 states between June 19, 2021 and October 2, 2021.

=== "Justice for J6" Rallies ===
Three rallies were held in the District of Columbia (DC): the first on was on June 19 outside the Department of Justice, the second on July 17 outside the DC Corrections facility, and the third on September 18 on the grounds of the U.S. Capitol. No member of congress attended—although candidates Mike Collins, who ran in Georgia's 10th congressional district, and Joe Kent, who ran in Washington's 3rd congressional district—did attend.

Lawmakers and law enforcement officials expressed concerns over possible unrest at the September 18 rally.

Delegate to the US House of Representatives Eleanor Holmes Norton, and member of the Democratic Party, said that the fence used for the security preparations for the inauguration of Joe Biden "should not be used to preemptively block people from protesting on Capitol grounds, no matter their views," as the rally was covered under the First Amendment.

Despite concerns, the event occurred without incident and remained peaceful. Four people were arrested both before and after the rally itself, although D.C. police stated that these arrests were unrelated.

Look Ahead America had also held satellite rallies in nine states before and after the September 18 rally, including July 14 in Arizona. The event included speakers U.S. Representative Paul Gosar and State Representative Mark Finchem. Seven rallies were held on July 17, 2021 in Florida, Iowa, New Jersey, New York, Texas, Wyoming and Georgia. One final rally was organized in South Carolina on September 25, 2021 by the Look Ahead America statewide coordinator, Lori Boddy. Director Matt Braynard spoke at the rally.

=== Candlelight vigils ===
On the first anniversary of the January 6 attack, Look Ahead America organized 35 candlelight vigils taking place across 12 States and Washington, D.C. Among these locations were:

- Nogales, Phoenix, Prescott, Yuma, and Queen Creek Arizona
- St. Augustine, Clearwater, Fort Lauderdale, Largo, Lakeland, Milton, and Vero Beach Florida
- Jefferson and Woodstock Georgia
- Columbus, North Carolina
- Aiken, South Carolina
- Washington, D.C.

Ashli Babbitt's mother, Micki Witthoeft, was present at the vigil in Washington, D.C. No individuals were arrested or injured at this event. However, a counterprotester was arrested at the Clearwater, Florida rally after being found with a homemade explosive device near the site. The man was later released and all felony charges against him were dropped, although he was sentenced to six months probation and a $450 fine for loitering or prowling charges.

=== J6 Question project ===
On February 24, 2022, Look Ahead America announced the launch of the J6 Question project, in which voters were encouraged to submit video recordings of themselves asking state and federal candidates in the 2022 United States elections what their policy would be regarding the suspects charged in connection with the January 6 incident. Congressional figures such as US Representative Miller-Meeks were interviewed. as well as 2022 Oregon gubernatorial candidates.

On June 14, 2023, Look Ahead America announced a $1000 reward for video recordings asking the following question of designated 2024 presidential candidates: “I’m a volunteer for Look Ahead America, and I want to know what you’re going to do for the Jan. 6th political prisoners, especially those who have not been charged with any violent acts.”

A video compiled by Look Ahead America appeared in a Washington Examiner article showing the responses to the J6 Question from GOP presidential candidates. The candidates included in the video are Nikki Haley, Ron DeSantis, Asa Hutchinson (who was interviewed by Micki Witthoeft and Tamara Perryman), Vivek Ramaswamy, and Donald J. Trump.

=== J6 Prisoner Database ===
On August 12, 2021 Look Ahead America launched the J6 Prisoner Database. The database can be downloaded from their website, and searched or sorted by multiple fields including name, case number, case status, and other fields.

On January 6, 2023, the second anniversary of the January 6th incident, Look Ahead America director Matt Braynard issued a statement concerning the prisoners. In his statement, he said, "Despite two years passing, of the nearly 1000 arrested so far, only 349 have had their cases resolved. There are forty-four serving in prison, including nine individuals who were not convicted of any violent acts." He also indicated that Look Ahead America plans to continue efforts to support the prisoners.

On August 3, 2023 former President Donald J. Trump was added to the J6 Prisoner Database as the result of being indicted in connection to the events of January 6, 2021. "Given the specious claims and prosecutorial abuse from our government that we've seen so far, I have to say I'm sadly not surprised that President Trump earned the distinction of joining the over 1,000 other political prisoners we've documented," Look Ahead America Founder and former Trump campaign staffer Matt Braynard told the Washington Examiner.

=== The Political Prisoner Podcast ===
On October 21, 2021 the group launched a podcast titled The Political Prisoner. Guests have included Micki Whitthoeft, Cara Castronuova, January 6 United States Capitol attack rioter Jake Lang, Oath Keepers member Jeremy Brown, and several others.

=== Jobs For #J6 ===
On October 3, 2022, Look Ahead America launched a project to connect January 6 participants and their families with businesses who are willing to hire them. It is an effort to assist the participants re-enter the workforce after arrest or incarceration and to provide their families with work opportunities as well.

== Dominion Voting Systems lawsuits ==
On March 18, 2021, Look Ahead America sued the Stark County Board of Elections for violating Ohio's Open Meetings Act when they considered purchasing Dominion Voting Systems equipment. The suit was filed in the Court of Common Pleas in Stark County on behalf of Look Ahead America and a Stark County resident.

On June 1, 2021, the Ohio Supreme Court ruled that the Stark County Board of Commissioners must buy the voting machines selected by the Stark County Board of Elections, citing R.C. 3506.03.

On August 20, 2021, the commissioners and Dominion were dropped as defendants, with only the Stark County Board of Elections remaining. Dominion will operate in Stark County for the time being.

On October 20, 2022, Stark County Common Pleas Judge Taryn Heath dismissed the case, which Look Ahead America appealed.

As of July 19, 2023, the appellate court rejected the appeal.

On February 16, 2024, Gannett Ohio, the parent company of The Canton Repository, filed a brief with the court supporting Look Ahead America.

The Ohio Supreme Court agreed to hear the appeal on April 24, 2024.

== 2021 CPAC sponsorships ==
=== Florida 2021 ===
Look Ahead America was present at the February 2021 Conservative Political Action Conference (CPAC) held in Orlando, Florida, where United States House of Representatives Congresswoman Marjorie Taylor Greene was their guest speaker.

Look Ahead America had an exhibit featuring a "Surfer Trump" statue loaned by artist Tommy Zegan that went viral. Zegan, a Trump supporter who had recently immigrated to Mexico, created the statue with a "magic wand" in his left hand, referring to the quote by then-president Barack Obama in which he posed, in reference to Trump's promise to increase manufacturing jobs in the United States, "Well, what, how exactly are you going to negotiate that? What magic wand do you have?"

=== Texas 2021 ===
Look Ahead America had both United States House of Representatives Congressmen Matt Gaetz and Allen West as guest speakers at the July 2021 CPAC in Dallas, Texas. The group held an unofficial panel taking place on the third day of the conference in a different room of the hotel.

== Activism ==
=== Look Ahead Arizona ===
On April 26, 2021, Look Ahead America launched Look Ahead Arizona, a voter registration and community organizing effort. It received a $2 million pledge from Jim Lamon for funding.

Look Ahead Arizona also held a series of Town hall meetings featuring former AZ Secretary of State Ken Bennett. The meetings were focused on the results of the 2021 Maricopa County presidential ballot audit.

An article published September 11, 2023 by the Arizona Daily Independent states that Look Ahead America has accused Arizona Attorney General Kris Mayes of ignoring evidence of 69 double voters submitted by the group. Most of the ballots in question were cast in the 2020 and 2022 General Elections. In a more recent article from the Arizona Globe dated September 14, 2023, the group stated that they will refile the original 69 challenges in 6 months, in accordance with Arizona filing rules, and will add additional cases that have been discovered.

=== New Jersey ===
After extensive meetings between Look Ahead America's local volunteers and New Jersey State Senator Joseph Pennacchio, the senator introduced bill S-4162, which would require all elections in the state to use open source voting equipment.

=== Georgia ===
On November 1, 2021, Look Ahead America's "Faith Outreach Coordinator" Brandon Sims proposed one day of Sunday voting to Cherokee County election officials. In turn, they passed a bipartisan motion opting for a trial run on Sunday, October 23, 2022, with a follow-up cost/benefit analysis.

On January 4, 2022, Sims discussed a similar proposal with Hall County, Georgia election officials, resulting in two days of Sunday voting from May 2 through May 20, 2022, with an additional two dates on October 22 and 23 for the Georgia General Election. The same proposal was discussed and approved in Forsyth County, which held its first day of Sunday Voting on May 15, 2022, for the General Primary and Nonpartisan General Election.

On February 8, 2022, Look Ahead America officially launched its get-out-the-vote effort "Patriotic Souls to the Polls," as a follow-up on prior activities. The initiative was launched in order to give rural churches the same opportunity to organize Souls to the Polls available to urban churches in municipalities such as Fulton County and DeKalb County, with the goal of increasing equitable voting access to citizens irrespective of socioeconomic status, party affiliation, or geographic location.

In March 2022, Sims presented the Sunday voting proposal to Bartow County officials but the motion did not pass.

=== Wisconsin ===
On May 31, 2022, the Wisconsin Election Commission (WEC) sent a letter to its municipal clerks stating that "clerks may have received communications from out-of-state groups Look Ahead America and the Voter Integrity Project" regarding errors in the municipalities' voter rolls. The areas addressed included indefinitely confined voters, voters who moved out of state or municipality, and voters registered at nonresidential areas. Although the WEC cautioned against inaccuracies, incomplete evidence, bias, and hearsay when dealing with allegations of improper registration, the commission acknowledged that Look Ahead America could potentially provide help in identifying errors in the voter rolls.

On July 14, 2022, Look Ahead America representatives claimed that "some district attorneys are reviewing cases with others pending litigation. Other non-resident registrations the organization uncovered were forwarded to the Fraud Unit of the Wisconsin Department of Motor Vehicles."

In October 2022, the WEC rejected 9 of 11 complaints filed by Wisconsin citizens on behalf of Look Ahead America (LAA). The WEC rejection letters included warnings of potential $500 fines for filing frivolous claims. The Look Ahead America Research Director, Ian Camacho, objected to allegations that the complaints were "frivolous" and affirmed that all filed complaints included ample primary source documentation to substantiate the claims. Despite the WEC responses, in some cases, municipal election clerks acted on the complaints after completing their own investigations.

A press release published by WisPolitics on September 27, 2022, stated Look Ahead America (LAA) successfully filed cases involving P.O. Box registrations and double voters with the Wisconsin Election Commission (WEC), despite its warnings about LAA and The Voter Integrity Project. One Wisconsin LAA volunteer has also successfully challenged 365 ineligible voters in Barron County as well.

According to a press release published by WisPolitics on November 21, 2023, the WEC will refer six voters registered at P.O. Boxes to the Dane, Kenosha, Marinette, and Waukesha County District Attorneys for prosecution based on complaints from three Look Ahead America (LAA) Wisconsin volunteers.

=== Pennsylvania ===
On December 6, 2022, citizens in the Lycoming County Patriots organization sued Lycoming County officials regarding the county results of the 2020 election and are requesting a forensic audit. They cited that Look Ahead America had provided 11 potential fraudulent registrations to director of elections Forrest K. Lehman, who is alleged to have admitted that six of these in fact were. As of December 27, 2022, the county is seeking to dismiss the suit.

On July 5, 2023, County Judge Eric R. Linhardt dismissed the complaint against Lycoming County. It is unclear at this time, whether the plaintiffs will pursue an appeal to Commonwealth Court.

It was reported on July 30, 2023 that an appeal has been filed in this case.

An August 23, 2023 report states that Judge Eric R. Linhardt again refuses a forensic audit. It is expected that the case will be sent to the Commonwealth Court.

=== South Carolina ===
In Aiken County, South Carolina, Lori Boddy got involved with Look Ahead America due to its work advocating for cleaned-up voter rolls. She served as South Carolina state coordinator and later organized the county GOP poll watchers during elections in 2021 and June 2022. In July 2022 Boddy was appointed to the board of elections.

Boddy also advocated for the January 6 prisoners, having organized a Justice for J6 rally in the city of Aiken, South Carolina on September 25, 2021, and a candlelight vigil on January 6, 2022.

=== Audits of voter lists ===
On October 5, 2022 Look Ahead America launched a project to identify voters who are candidates for removal from voter rolls so that challenges could be made to those registrations. The reasons cited for the project were illegitimate addresses or voters having moved permanently out of state. Nine states were included in this program: Ohio, Arizona, Florida, Georgia, North Carolina, Nevada, Pennsylvania, Virginia, and Wisconsin. Although it was reported that no challenges were received in Ohio, the Montgomery County, Ohio Board of Elections reported receiving 15 challenges although only 2 are being considered for a possible hearing. Challenges have also been made in Nevada and Georgia by citizens of those states.

=== Voter fraud cases ===
On April 17, 2023, a voter in Bradley County, Tennessee by the name of Emily Jessop Bowers pled nolo contendere to three counts of voter fraud in the 2020 and 2022 United States presidential primary elections and the 2020 United States Presidential Election. The conviction of Bowers resulted from information that Look Ahead America’s Director of Research, Ian Camacho submitted to Tennessee authorities in February 2021 regarding the 2020 General Election, and again in 2022 to Volusia County, Florida.

On May 11, 2023, Look Ahead America issued a press release indicating that the County Attorney of Yuma County, Arizona has declined to prosecute a case of double voting involving Arizona and Wisconsin. The case was originally reported to the Yuma County sheriff's office by LAA in November 2021 and was one of 16 opened for investigation by the Yuma County sheriff. The stated reason for the decision is that there is still "insufficient evidence" to pursue the case. It also has cases open and referred to election authorities in Texas, Georgia, Wisconsin and other states.

Twenty-two Georgia counties removed ineligible voters from the rolls based on information reported by Look Ahead America. The State Elections Board also referred LAA's case of the woman who voted in Georgia after moving to South Carolina to the attorney general's office.

On November 7, 2023, the Hamilton County, Indiana Election Board unanimously voted to send a case of voter fraud to the Hamilton County Prosecutor's office. The information came from Camacho, who testified that the double voter was found after checking a National Change of Address filed in September 2022, voter registration records, and voting records. There was probable cause to believe the voter had double voted in both Mesa, Arizona and Carmel, Indiana in the 2020 General Election during early voting, and that the voter had voted first in Arizona and then in Indiana.

In December 2023, a 2-part article was published concerning the efforts of LAA to identify and report questionable ballots. As of December 4, 2023, the organization has identified and referred a total of 281 cases of suspected voter fraud to law enforcement. States involved include Texas, Arizona, Georgia, Wisconsin and Michigan.
