= Trans Boxing =

Collaborative art project

Trans Boxing is an ongoing collaborative art project in the form of a boxing club, which was founded in New York City by Nolan Hanson in 2017. The project aims to provide safe and inclusive gym spaces for transgender and non-binary people that often face discrimination and aggression in typical gym environments.

The project has facilitated regular classes in New York City and Los Angeles, and produced site-specific residencies, installations, publications, films, and workshops. In 2021, Trans Boxing began a residency at Gleason's Gym, Brooklyn, New York, where the project supports the development of further inclusion and accessibility within the sport.
