= Cara Castronuova =

White House Correspondent and Investigative Journalist (born 1980)

- Born: February 6, 1980 (age 46); Manhasset, New York, United States
- Occupations: 2-Time Golden Gloves Champion Boxer, Health & Fitness Trainer, Television Personality, Investigative Journalist, Political Activist
- Political party: Republican

Cara Castronuova (born February 6, 1980) is an American champion boxer, celebrity fitness trainer, professional sports announcer, political activist, and investigative journalist, and currently serves as White House correspondent with the US Presidential Press Pool. She has won two Golden Gloves championships at Madison Square Garden, was ranked #2 nationally by USA Boxing, has appeared on television as a head trainer on NBC's The Biggest Loser and as a boxing ring announcer. She was a co-host of political commentary show Wiseguys on Newsmax for over three years, and works for the far-right website The Gateway Pundit.

== Boxing career ==
Castronuova began her boxing career as a youth boxing trainer. Soon after, she started entering local bouts, winning her first fight in 2002 at the NY Empire State Games in Syracuse. She was also a volunteer for a government-funded program designed to teach troubled youth the virtues of boxing and keep them off the streets.

Later, while working as a personal fitness and boxing trainer at popular sports clubs in the New York City area, such as Chelsea Piers and Gleason's Boxing Gym, she used fighting and boxing to encourage clients to "find their warrior within". While continuing to train clients, Castronuova kept boxing competitively, winning a pair of "Silver Gloves" in 2004, the second-place prize in the Golden Gloves competition. Determined to redeem herself, Castronuova came back one year later and won her first New York Golden Gloves championship at Madison Square Garden in front of a televised, capacity crowd.

Following her first Golden Gloves win, she started competing nationally and was ranked #2 in the nation by USA Boxing. She went on to place in national boxing tournaments and win numerous titles, such as the NYABC title, the Metros, and the Empire State Games, and won her second Golden Gloves title in 2006 at Madison Square Garden. Certified as a boxing coach by the New York State Athletic Commission, she is also a personal trainer certified by ISSA (International Sports Science Association).

== Television career and appearances ==
Cara has trained extensively in martial arts and other fighting techniques, which led to acting opportunities, primarily as a stuntwoman and stunt coordinator. In addition, she has worked as a correspondent and fitness writer for news and boxing press outlets, and as a sports commentator in various boxing venues like Madison Square Garden and Mohegan Sun.

She spent one season on NBC's hit show The Biggest Loser as a head trainer opposite Jillian Michaels, Bob Harper and Brett Hoebel. Here she was credited by NBC for inspiring Season 11 contestants and the audience of The Biggest Loser to find "their fighter within" and make their own comebacks on the road to good health.

Cara has been featured on Bravo's Top Chef Masters.

Castronuova has appeared in and voiced characters for Grand Theft Auto.

She has been featured on the cover of USA Today as well as on E!, Entertainment Tonight, TMZ, The History Channel, The New York Daily News, The New York Post, The National Enquirer, Self magazine, Shape magazine and Women's Health.

She has worked as a spokesperson for Puma and Everlast Sports.

Cara shot a pilot for a major production company and it is currently being shopped. She shot it with her ex-boyfriend, professional boxer and Showtime color commentator Paulie Malignaggi.

On October 14, 2013, Cara participated in an Everlast/Modell's sponsored event for breast cancer awareness in Times Square.

Castronuova is a boxing and referee apprentice for USA Boxing.

Castronuova is notable as one of the few female boxing ring announcers in the USA. On January 10, 2020, she announced the Press Conference Weigh-In and the undercard leading up to the historical Showtime Championship Boxing "Herstory" matchup between Claressa Shields and Ivana Habazin.

== Political activism ==
In 2020, Castronuova appeared on Fox & Friends and other news outlets speaking about her political movement "Liberate New York".

She was recognized by President Donald Trump for her work in political activism on his Twitter account before it was shut down.

She was one of the organizers of the Justice for J6 rally, a September 18, 2021 rally in Washington, D.C., in demonstration in support of those arrested for the January 6 United States Capitol attack.

On behalf of CAPP: Citizens Against Political Persecution, Cara also partnered with the organization Look Ahead America, its founder Matt Braynard, and the organizations filed a formal complaint with the United Nations Human Rights Committee regarding the January 6 prisoners.

Braynard and Castronuova also worked together to hold rallies in New York City, Washington, D.C., and in 17 states between 19 June 2021 and 2 October 2021.

== Journalism career ==
Cara was a co-host on the political commentary program Wiseguys on Newsmax for over three years between 2021 and 2024.

Since 2021, Cara Castronuova has covered political and legal issues for The Gateway Pundit. Since January 2025, Cara has worked as a White House Correspondent covering the daily White House Press briefings, as a member of the Presidential Press Pool, and other White House events for LindellTV.

== Charitable and non-profit work ==
Castronuova has been involved in founding several charitable and nonprofit initiatives focused on youth health, community development, and civil liberties.

Cara founded the Knockout Obesity Foundation, a 501(c)(3) nonprofit organization that helps kids who are obese, or at risk of becoming obese, lose weight and get healthy by teaching them the virtues of boxing.

She has also worked with Camp Kid Warrior, a youth program that emphasizes confidence-building, discipline, and physical fitness through structured athletic and mentorship activities.

In the area of civil liberties advocacy, Castronuova was a co-founder of Liberate New York - an organization that hosted rallies in opposition to mask mandates, lockdowns, and vaccination mandates imposed by local and state governments during the COVID-19 pandemic in the United States.

Cara was also a co-founder of Citizens Against Political Persecution (CAPP) - an organization that advocated for due process and the legal rights of individuals it described as politically targeted.

== Political campaigns ==
In 2022, Castronuova was the Republican candidate for the New York State Assembly in District 22, appearing on the general election ballot.

Cara declared her candidacy for the Republican nomination for the United States Senate in New York in 2024. The New York Republican Party challenged her ballot access, and her eligibility for the primary ballot became the subject of litigation.
