= Justice for J6 rally =

2021 protest in Washington, D.C., U.S.

Justice for J6
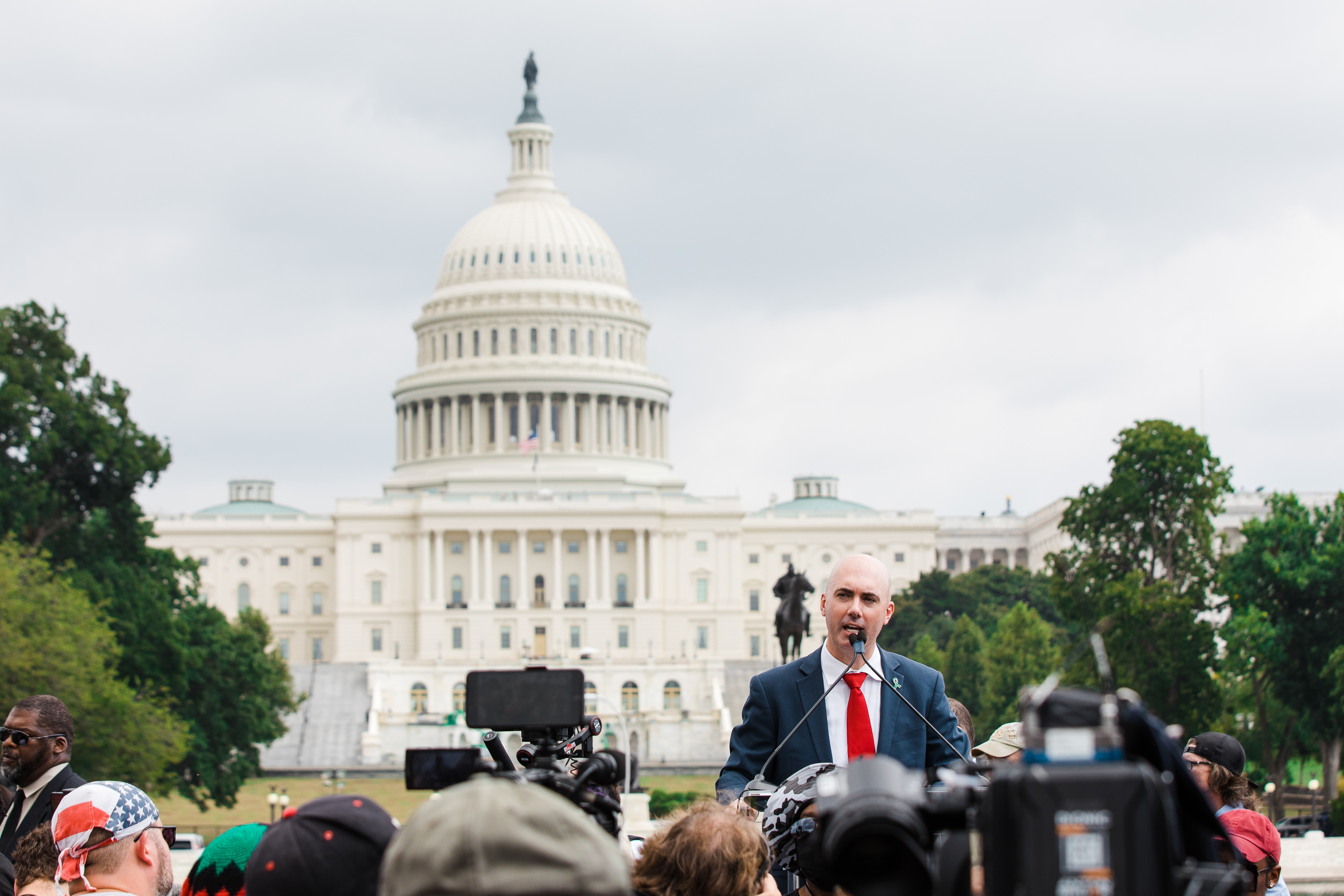
- Former Trump campaign staffer Matt Braynard speaking at the Justice for J6 rally
- Date: September 18, 2021; 4 years ago
- Caused by: Right-wing support for the participants of the January 6 United States Capitol attack – opposition to arrests and criminal charges brought in the attack
- Methods: Demonstration

Number
- 100–200

The Justice for J6 rally was a right-wing to far-right demonstration in Washington, D.C., in support of hundreds of people who were arrested and charged following the January 6 United States Capitol attack. It occurred on September 18, 2021. The event attracted 100–200 activists. It was organized by a former Donald Trump campaign staffer. The event was noted for extensive security preparations and concerns over possible unrest.

== Background ==
The investigation of the participants who attacked the U.S. Capitol building was the largest criminal probe in U.S. history. Over 5,000 FBI employees worked on the investigation. Four years after the attack, everyone who had been federally charged related to the riot received clemency from President Donald Trump.

On January 6, 2021, Trump supporters attacked the Capitol, disrupting the joint session of Congress assembled to count electoral votes to formalize Biden's victory in the 2020 United States presidential election.

In August, a Justice for J6 rally was organized by Look Ahead America, a nonprofit led by former Trump campaign staffer Matt Braynard, was scheduled to be held on the grounds of the U.S. Capitol starting at 12:00 p.m. ET on September 18. It was Look Ahead America's third rally held in Washington, D.C.; its first was outside the Department of Justice on June 19, 2021, and its second was outside of the District of Columbia Department of Corrections facility on July 17.

Look Ahead America had also held satellite rallies in nine states prior to the September 18 rally. On July 14 it held a rally in Arizona, which included speakers U.S. Representative Paul Gosar and State Representative Mark Finchem. The other eight rallies held on July 17, 2021, took place in Georgia, Florida, Iowa, New Jersey, New York, South Carolina, Texas, and Wyoming.

The rallies were intended as a show of support for people charged for participating in the attack. Lawmakers and law enforcement officials expressed their concerns over possible unrest at the rally. On August 27, 2021, Matt Braynard on behalf of Look Ahead America and Cara Castronuova of Citizens Against Political Persecution (CAPP) filed a formal complaint with the UN Human Rights Committee regarding the plight of the prisoners.

=== Preparations ===
Matt Braynard stated in interviews that the rally is "100% about #JusticeforJ6 and not the election or any candidate." The official Look Ahead America website discouraged attendees from wearing political gear, stating "Do not wear or bring political, candidate, or another organization’s paraphernalia. This includes clothing or banners supportive of President Trump or President Biden."

In response to the rally's announcement, the Metropolitan Police Department was activated for September 18. There were also discussions about restoring the fencing surrounding the Capitol, though they were initially met with bipartisan disapproval. It was unclear how many people planned to attend the event.

A counter-rally was subsequently scheduled on the same day, heightening concerns over participants of both events clashing. The Department of Homeland Security shared an intelligence briefing memo to state and local law enforcement agencies, which warned of potential violence at the rally and on the day before. The memo did not identify a specific or credible plot associated with the event, but it also warned that individuals and small groups can "mobilize to violence with little-to-no warning, particularly in response to confrontational encounters with perceived opponents or calls for escalation by key influencers."

The protective fencing was restored along with facial recognition cameras (Note: The fencing had been raised in the aftermath of the Capitol attack, and subsequently removed in July.) around the Capitol by September 13, and multiple congressional offices were slated to close on September 17. Delegate to the US House of Representatives Eleanor Holmes Norton, and member of the Democratic Party, said that the fence used for the security preparations for the inauguration of Joe Biden "should not be used to preemptively block people from protesting on Capitol grounds, no matter their views," as the rally was covered under the First Amendment. Although the fencing was removed shortly after the rally, the facial recognition cameras continue to be deployed around the Capitol.

== Rally ==
100 to 200 demonstrators attended the rally. Capitol Police made an estimation that a maximum of 450 people were in the crowd, which was made up of demonstrators, counter-demonstrators, and journalists, with the media reported to even outnumber the demonstrators at times. Among the speakers were Look Ahead America rally organizer Matt Braynard, Citizens Against Political Persecution co-founder Cara Castronuova, and family members of the prisoners. No member of Congress attended, though Mike Collins, who ran for Georgia's 10th district, and Joe Kent, who ran for Washington's 3rd district, did.

The event occurred without incident and remained a peaceful demonstration as planned. Four people were arrested before and after the rally, although D.C. police said they made no arrests related to the rally. Earlier in the day, two people were arrested for outstanding firearms violation warrants. One man arrested nearby was found to be in possession of a large knife. Another arrested 15 minutes after the rally, a US Customs and Border Protection officer, was found to be in possession of a gun but was not prosecuted.

The rally was noted for its contradictory statements.

The event saw heightened security presence by the United States Capitol Police and other law enforcement agencies.

== Events elsewhere ==
Both during and after the September 18 rally, Look Ahead America had rallies in 17 other states. Two were held on the same day as the rally: Charlotte, North Carolina and Seattle, Washington. The 15 other state rallies occurred in Arizona, California, Colorado, Georgia, Iowa, Kansas, Massachusetts, Missouri, New Jersey, New York, South Carolina, Tennessee, Texas, Virginia, and Wyoming.

== 2022 candlelight vigils ==
On the first anniversary of the January 6 attack, Look Ahead America organized 35 candlelight vigils taking place across 12 U.S. states and Washington, D.C. Among these locations were:

- Nogales, Phoenix, Prescott, Yuma, and Queen Creek, Arizona
- St. Augustine, Clearwater, Fort Lauderdale, Largo, Lakeland, Milton, and Vero Beach, Florida
- Jefferson and Woodstock, Georgia
- Columbus, North Carolina
- Aiken, South Carolina
- Washington, D.C.

Micki Witthoeft, the mother of Capitol rioter Ashli Babbitt who was killed during the riot, was present at the vigil in Washington, D.C.

== Reactions ==
Ahead of the event, Braynard criticized the security measures established in response to the event, saying they were designed to discourage and deter participants. In response to the planned rally, former U.S. President Donald Trump called it a "setup" for Republican voters, saying, "If people don't show up they'll say, 'Oh, it's a lack of spirit.' And if people do show up they'll be harassed." For the most part, congressional Republicans had distanced themselves from the demonstration, saying little if anything about it. On social media, far-right groups, such as the Proud Boys, and certain allies of such groups, had been urging their members and others not to attend the event.

According to Mother Jones, extremism experts criticized the media for exaggerating the potential for violence at the rally prior to it taking place.

Senate Majority Leader Chuck Schumer (D-NY) described security at the event as more "well-prepared" in contrast to the 2021 Capitol attack.

== See also ==
- Attempts to overturn the 2020 United States presidential election
- Democratic backsliding in the United States
- Eastman memos
- Republican efforts to restrict voting following the 2020 United States presidential election
- Republican reactions to Donald Trump's claims of 2020 election fraud
- Sedition Caucus
- United States House Select Committee on the January 6 Attack public hearings
