= Ink Master season 10 =

Ink Master: Return of the Masters
- Season 10
- Hosted by: Dave Navarro
- Judges: Chris Núñez; Oliver Peck
- No. of contestants: 18
- Winner: Josh Payne
- No. of episodes: 16

Release
- Original network: Spike (episode 1 & 2); Paramount Network (episodes 3–16)
- Original release: January 9 – April 24, 2018

Season chronology
- ← Previous; Shop Wars Next → Grudge Match — Cleen vs. Christian

Ink Master: Return of the Masters is the tenth season of the tattoo reality competition Ink Master, with 16 episodes that aired from January to April 2018. The first two episodes of the season marked the series' last to air on Spike prior to the network's transition to Paramount Network nine days later on January 18. Despite this, the remaining episodes continued to air on the new channel. The show is hosted and judged by Jane's Addiction guitarist Dave Navarro, with accomplished tattoo artists Chris Núñez and Oliver Peck serving as series regular judges. The winner received $100,000, a feature in Inked magazine and the title of Ink Master.

The premise of this season was having three teams of six artists that were led by three Ink Master winners, season 2 winner Steve Tefft, season 7 winner Anthony Michaels, and season 9 winner DJ Tambe (Old Town Ink). The live finale also featured the coaches going head-to-head in the first ever Master Face-Off, in which the winning master would also receive $100,000. This is the first season to feature contestants from the spin-off Ink Master: Angels who won their respective Angel Face Off to earn a spot to compete in this season.

The winner of the tenth season of Ink Master was Joshua Payne, with Juan Salgado being the runner-up. The winner of the Master Face-Off was DJ Tambe, making him the first and only to win two consecutive seasons, with Anthony Michaels being the runner-up.

== Judging and ranking ==
=== Judging Panel ===
The judging panel is a table of three or more primary judges in addition to the coaches. The judges and the coaches make their final decision by voting to see who had best tattoo of the day, and who goes home.

=== Master Jury ===
Similar to the human canvas jury and jury of peers, the coaches had to select one artist with the worst tattoo of the day to be put up for elimination.

=== Jury of Peers ===
At the live finale, the eliminated artists chose one artist and one coach to advance into the final two.

== Contestants ==
The first episode featured 24 artists competing in a two part marathon to be one of the 18 artists which will then narrow down to the team's six members who were drafted through the first day of the competition. In the first part of the marathon, the top 9 artists chose which team they wanted to be part of, while in the second part, the coaches were able to finalize their teams by picking from the remaining 15 artists.

Names, experience, and cities stated are at time of filming.

Contestant Name	Years of experience	Hometown	Outcome
Josh Payne	14	Cortland, New York	Winner
Juan Salgado	15	San Juan, Puerto Rico	Runner-up
Roly T-Rex	6	Orlando, Florida	3rd place
Jason Elliott	6	College Station, Texas	4th place
Deanna Smith	3^{1/2}	Denton, Texas	5th place
Jeremy Brown	15	Garden Grove, California	6th place
Daniel Silva	3	San Francisco, California	7th place
Frank Ready	12	Oklahoma City, Oklahoma	8th place
Rene "Fame" Montalvo	10	Willimantic, Connecticut	9th place
Amanda Leitch	5	Renton, Washington	10th place
Mike Diaz	4	Lubbock, Texas	11th place
Gary Parisi	21	Chicago, Illinois	12th place
Derrick "Lil’D"	24	Atlanta, Georgia	13th place
Katie Rhoden	8	LaPlace, Louisiana	14th place
Matt Buck	4	New York, New York	15th place
Chris Sparks	10	Austin, Texas	16th place
Linzy Michelle	9	Ventura, California	17th place
Garrett Bisbee	4	Milwaukee, Wisconsin	18th place

=== Chosen ===
Team Anthony
Mike Diaz
Jason Elliott
Amanda Leitch
Linzy Michelle
Juan Salgado
Daniel Silva (Note: Earned a spot on Season 10 by defeating an Angel on the spin-off show Ink Master: Angels)

Team DJ
Matt Buck
Lil’ D
Josh Payne
Frank Ready
Chris Sparks
Deanna Smith

Team Steve
Garrett Bisbee
Jeremy Brown
Rene "Fame" Montalvo
Gary Parisi
Katie Rhoden
Roly T-Rex

=== Not chosen ===
Contestant Name
Tim Furlow
Rachael Head
Rachel Helmich
Christian Masot
Koko Tatts
Slowburn

== Contestant progress ==
Indicates the contestant was a part of Team Anthony. Indicates the contestant was a part of Team DJ. Indicates the contestant was a part of Team Steve.

Contestant	Episode														
Contestant	2	3 (Note: Team Steve were exempt from elimination.)	4	5	6	7 (Note: Josh defeated Gary in the Face-Off challenge to determine who would stay in the competition..)	8 (Note: None of the contestants impressed the judges enough for them to determine a winner.)	9	10 (Note: Team Anthony won the first round, while Team DJ won the second round. Jeremy and Roly defeated Fame in the Face-Off challenge to determine who would stay in the competition.)	11	12	13 (Note: Josh and Juan matched their Masters' tattoos, exempting them from elimination. Deanna, Jason and Roly defeated Jeremy in the Face-Off challenge to determine who would stay in the competition.)	14	15	16
Josh Payne	SAFE	TOP2	SAFE	TOP2	TOP4	BTM2	SAFE	WIN	WIN	HIGH	SAFE	SAFE	WIN	WIN	Winner
Juan Salgado	SAFE	SAFE	SAFE	SAFE	TOP4	WIN	SAFE	SAFE	WIN	WIN	WIN	SAFE	TOP2	ADV	Runner-up
Roly T-Rex	SAFE	SAFE	SAFE	SAFE	SAFE	SAFE	SAFE	SAFE	BTM3	TOP2	SAFE	BTM4	BTM3	ADV	Eliminated
Jason Elliott	SAFE	BTM6	SAFE	WIN	SAFE	WIN	SAFE	SAFE	WIN	SAFE	BTM3	BTM4	BTM3	ELIM	Guest
Deanna Smith	BTM3	BTM6	HIGH	SAFE	SAFE	SAFE	HIGH	BTM3	WIN	BTM3	TOP2	BTM4	ELIM		Guest
Jeremy Brown	HIGH	SAFE	TOP2	SAFE	TOP4	SAFE	SAFE	BTM3	BTM3	BTM3	BTM3	ELIM			Guest
Daniel Silva	WIN	SAFE	SAFE	LOW	BTM3	WIN	BTM3	SAFE	WIN	LOW	ELIM				Guest
Frank Ready	SAFE	WIN	HIGH	SAFE	SAFE	SAFE	SAFE	HIGH	WIN	ELIM					Guest
Fame	SAFE	SAFE	WIN	BTM3	WIN	SAFE	BTM3	SAFE	ELIM						Guest
Amanda Leitch	BTM3	BTM6	SAFE	SAFE	SAFE	WIN	SAFE	ELIM							Guest
Mike Diaz	LOW	SAFE	SAFE	LOW	BTM3	WIN	ELIM								Guest
Gary Parisi	SAFE	SAFE	LOW	SAFE	HIGH	ELIM									Guest
Lil’ D	SAFE	BTM6	BTM3	BTM3	ELIM										Guest
Katie Rhoden	SAFE	SAFE	BTM3	ELIM											Guest
Matt Buck	SAFE	SAFE	ELIM												Guest
Linzy Michelle	SAFE	ELIM													Guest
Sparks	LOW	ELIM													Guest
Garrett Bisbee	ELIM														Guest

The contestant won Ink Master.
The contestant was the runner-up.
The contestant was eliminated during the finale.
The contestant advanced to the finale.
The contestant won Best Tattoo of the Day.
The contestant was among the top.
The contestant received positive critiques.
The contestant received negative critiques.
The contestant was in the bottom.
The contestant was put in the bottom by the Master Jury.
The contestant was eliminated from the competition.
The contestant was put in the bottom by the Master Jury and was eliminated from the competition.
The contestant returned as a guest for that episode.

== Episodes ==
No. overall	No. in season	Title	Original release date	US viewers (millions)
125	1	"Pick Your Side"	January 9, 2018	0.78
24 artists arrive to Coney Island where they had six hours to impress the masters by tattooing a design in the style and subject of their choice. The judges and the masters then judged each tattoo in a blind critique without knowing who did what.: Team Picks – Part 1: The top nine artists who were among the favorites will pick the team they want to be on with three spots available for each team. Team DJ scored big with the number one, two and three ranked tattoos from Matt, Josh and Deanna respectively while Anthony and Steve continue to find someone on their respective. Juan and Jason were the fourth and fifth ranked tattoos of the day and they chose to be on Team Anthony. Steve got the upper hand from Anthony when Katie chose to be on the former's team. Seventh ranked artist Daniel finishes Team Anthony for now. Therefore, Steve is left with Garret and Roly T-Rex.; Elimination Tattoo: The remaining 15 artists had one last chance to impress when they had six hours to tattoo one of the masters’ choice styles which includes Japanese from Steve, illustrative woman's face from Anthony, and American Traditional from DJ.; Team Picks – Part 2: The masters called the shots with picking their final three members this time even though a tug-o-war occurred during the picking process. Anthony rounds out his team with the inclusion of Linzy in addition to DJ's original pick Amanda, and Steve's original pick Mike. Steve and DJ fought over Jeremy and Fame. But they later both chose Steve. Frank, Sparks and Lil D completed Team DJ. After being convinced by the 7 remaining artists why they want to be on his team, Steve chose Gary as his final pick.; Eliminated: Tim Furlow, Rachael Head, Rachel Helmich, Christian Masot, Koko Tatts and Slowburn
126	2	"Fill'er Up"	January 16, 2018	0.84
Skill of the Week: Fundamentals; Flash Challenge: Using only 10,000 plastic cups, the masters must coach their teams in the first flash challenge of the season when the artists had five hours to line the cups up into one single image after filling each cup with water and food coloring.; Winner: Team DJ; Eimination Tattoo: The teams must navigate in the right direction during their first elimination tattoo by tattooing a maze. For this skull pick, DJ picked Matt and Josh to assign the skulls.; Best Tattoo of the Day: Daniel Silva; Coaches’ Bottom Pick: Garrett Bisbee; Bottom: Garrett Bisbee, Amanda Leitch and Deanna Smith; Eliminated: Garrett Bisbee
127	3	"Divine Proportion"	January 23, 2018	0.76
Skill of the Week: Proportion; Master's Tattoo Face Off: The coaches must use their proportion skills by tattooing a freehanded design in the style and subject of their choice. Dave also revealed that this week will feature a double elimination featuring one member eliminated from each team.; Winner: Steve Tefft; Elimination Tattoo: Team Steve called the shots when they assigned not only the human canves but also the Greek god to each team with Team DJ tattooing Zeus and Team Anthony tattooing Hades. Then during the elimination, Anthony and DJ must decide on which of their respective teammates will be sent packing.; Best Tattoo of the Day: Frank Ready; Bottom: Sparks, Lil' D, Deanna Smith, Amanda Leitch, Linzy Michelle and Jason Elliot; Eliminated: Linzy Michelle and Sparks
128	4	"Step It Up"	January 30, 2018	0.80
Skill of the Week: Ingenuity; Flash Challenge: The judges throw a curveball at the artists this week, testing their ingenuity by having them transform disjointed staircases into a massive flowing designs.; Winner: Team Anthony; Elimination Tattoo: Using two completely opposite tattoo styles, the artists must use ingenuity to weave these styles together in a way that makes sense and creates a cohesive design.; Best Tattoo of the Day: FAME; Coaches' Bottom Pick: Matt Buck; Bottom: Matt Buck, Lil' D and Katie Rhoden; Eliminated: Matt Buck
129	5	"Ink On the Dotted Line"	February 6, 2018	0.72
Skill of the Week: Precision; Flash Challenge: The coaches work side-by-side along their teams as precision is tested. Placing thousands of hole-punched colored dots onto a massive canvas to create an impressive work of art.; Winner: Team DJ: Elimination Tattoo: The artists must take images and break them down to individual squares and colors, inking their canvases with pixelated tattoos. With tons of lines and squares to complete, precision is of the utmost importance.; Best Tattoo of the Day: Jason Elliot; Coaches' Bottom Pick: Katie Rhoden; Bottom: Katie Rhoden, Lil' D and FAME; Eliminated: Katie Rhoden
130	6	"Chin Up"	February 13, 2018	0.67
Skill of the Week: Adaptability; Master's Flash Challenge: The artists place their fates in the hands of their coaches when adaptability is tested and DJ, Steve, and Anthony must tattoo an incredibly difficult part of the body: the under chin.; Winner: Anthony Michaels: Elimination Tattoo: From oozing wounds and rotting skin to decomposing hair and nails, the artists must use adaptability to turn the living into the undead on canvases’ skin.; Best Tattoo of the Day: FAME; Coaches' Pick: Daniel Silva; Bottom: Daniel Silva, Mike Diaz and Lil' D; Eliminated: Lil' D
131	7	"Eye of the Tiger"	February 20, 2018	0.73
Skill of the Week: Consistency; Elimination Tattoo: The artists must work as teams to tattoo not one, but two tattoos on one human canvas at the same time: one of a living animal, and one of its skeleton.; Best Tattoo of the Day: Team Anthony; Face Off Tattoo: Josh and Gary face off for survival in the competition, tasked with inking black and grey realistic tiger heads in just six hours.; Eliminated: Gary Parisi
132	8	"Pane in the Glass"	February 27, 2018	0.73
Skill of the week: Dimension; Flash Challenge: Both the artists and the coaches are tested this week on dimension, tasked with painting layered panes of plexiglass to create cohesive dimensional pieces of art.; Winner: Team Steve: Elimination Tattoo: To capture the strength and depth of carved stone, the artists must tattoo textured cracks and deep divots so that their designs look like they were chiseled right out of their canvases’ skin. Due to certain problems in every tattoo that did not hit the challenge, the judges decided there is no Best Tattoo of the Day.; Coaches' Bottom Pick: Daniel Silva; Bottom: Daniel Silva, Mike Diaz and FAME; Eliminated: Mike Diaz
133	9	"Ink Raider"	March 6, 2018	0.74
Skill of the Week: Detail; Flash Challenge: Inspired by the 2018 film adaption of the Tomb Raider video game reboot, the competition welcomed human canvases that are strong women who overcame obstacles – and want to get tattooed by the tools that empower them in the first individual flash challenge.; Winner: Roly T-Rex; Elimination Tattoo: From intricate ropes to colorful and elaborate patterns, the artists must make sure every tiny detail is on point as they tattoo technicolor hot air balloons.; Best Tattoo of the Day: Josh Payne; Coaches' Bottom Pick: Deanna Smith; Bottom: Deanna Smith, Jeremy Brown and Amanda Leitch; Eliminated: Amanda Leitch
134	10	"Some Assembly Required"	March 13, 2018	0.83
Skill of the Week: Accuracy; With nine artists remaining, they must compete in a marathon where they have to tattoo a different creature of land, sea or sky in each round.: Team Safety Marathon - Round 1: The teams created octopus tattoos with one artist doing the linework while the other adds in the shading before the third artist colors the tattoo. The winning team in this round will be safe from elimination. As winner of the last elimination tattoo, Josh assigned all the human canvases.; Best Tattoo of the Day: Team Anthony; Team Safety Marathon – Round 2: Team DJ and Team Steve work on pegasus tattoos. But they won't be doing it alone as each team must tag team its respective partner and coach every hour.; Best Tattoo of the Day: Team DJ; Face Off Tattoo: Steve watches his team square off in a fight for survival as they tattooed a full-bodied jaguar in the style selected by him which was realistic black and grey.; Eliminated: FAME; Note: This episode was released online ahead of its respective airdate.
135	11	"Quit Buggin' Me"	March 20, 2018	0.72
Skill of the Week: Technical Application; Flash Challenge: The coaches try to get every detail they could when they had two hours to tattoo their respective micro-realistic insect.; Winner: Anthony Michaels; Elimination Tattoo: The artists must prove their mastery of technical application by tattooing the gateway to the heart – aka the sternum.; Best Tattoo of the Day: Juan Salgado; Coaches' Bottom Pick: Frank Ready; Bottom: Frank Ready, Jeremy Brown and Deanna Smith; Eliminated: Frank Ready
136	12	"Total Meltdown"	March 27, 2018	0.71
Skill of the Week: Composition; Flash Challenge: The teams and their respective coaches work with granulated wax to create a masterpiece by stenciling the design with tape onto a 4 x 6 canvas before using heat guns and torches to spread the wax while leaving behind a negative space the tape covered.; Winner: Team Steve; Elimination Tattoo: The artists must change their perspectives and create a masterpiece out of what is not there - by inking negative space tattoos.; Best Tattoo of the Day: Juan Salgado; Coaches' Bottom Pick: Daniel Silva; Bottom: Daniel Silva, Jeremy Brown and Jason Elliott; Eliminated: Daniel Silva
137	13	"Monkey See, Monkey Do"	April 3, 2018	0.71
Skill of the Week: Finesse; Elimination Tattoo: The final six attempt to match the masters' standards. Roly was concerned when Steve showed him and Jeremy a skull with the heads of a demon and a woman. Team DJ and Team Anthony on the other hand had no problem with the design from their respective coaches.; Face Off Tattoo: Deanna, Jason, Roly T-Rex and Jeremy must design a free hand tattoo in order to save themselves from elimination. Jeremy tried to use the design Team DJ had in the elimination tattoo which concerns the masters. Team Steve struggled the most with their tattoo.; Eliminated: Jeremy Brown
138	14	"No Stain, No Gain"	April 10, 2018	0.68
Skill of the Week: Contrast; Flash Challenge: The battle intensifies as the coaches and artists are given six hours to layer coats of paint on gigantic wooden canvases in order to create high-contrast works of art.; Winner: Team DJ; Elimination Tattoo: With only one color at the artists’ disposal, contrast is absolutely crucial as the final five are tasked with tattooing masterful monochromatic portraits.; Best Tattoo of the Day: Josh Payne; Coaches' Bottom Pick: Deanna Smith; Bottom: Deanna Smith, Roly T-Rex and Jason Elliott; Eliminated: Deanna Smith
139	15	"Final Exam"	April 17, 2018	0.76
Elimination Tattoo: The final four remaining artists are tasked with tattooing a one-session twelve hour tattoo on the arm, with the style and subject being the artists' choice. Josh's tattoo was considered the best twelve hour tattoo and this earned him a spot in the finale, additionally allowing DJ to call to call the first shot in the Master Face-Off.; Best Tattoo of the Day: Josh Payne; Elimination Tattoo: Having a style and subject picked by the opposing team coaches based on their weaknesses, the final four must tattoo a six hour tattoo without tracing. In addition, they must incorporate a design and style that were given to them by each coach. Juan's six hour tattoo was considered the best six hour tattoo and this allowed Anthony to call the second shot in the Master Face-Off. After a tough decision, Roly T-Rex was selected as the final artist advancing to the finale which allows Steve to call the third and final shot.; Eliminated: Jason Elliott; Finale Tattoo: Josh, Juan and Roly T-Rex head home to create a 24-hour full–colored chestpiece that depicts an epic battle between a snake, a dragon and an eagle. The coaches get inside the heads as they create a 24-hour head tattoo before duking it out at the live finale where they will have to design a six hour to tattoo. In addition, each coach called the shot via skull picks that will determine the style, subject or placement. DJ, Anthony and Steve picked a full-bodied snake, thigh, and Neo-traditional respectively.
140	16	"Return of the Masters Finale"	April 24, 2018	0.75
Dave welcomes the viewers to the live Ink Master finale from Las Vegas as the coaches put the final touches on their live finale tattoo. The coaches went first with their tattoo while the artists reveal their epic chest piece. The judges also critiqued the coaches' head tattoo. The eliminated artists get into a heated debate over who should advance to the top two. The judges then decide which of the top two artists will win the title of Ink Master. Ink Master veterans Cleen Rock One and Christian Buckingham were introduced to plug the upcoming eleventh season that will finally see them settling the score with their rivalry as coaches.: Jury of Peers' Pick: Juan Selgado; Judges' Pick: Joshua Payne; 3rd Place: Roly T-Rex; Winner: Joshua Payne; In addition to one artist, the jury of peers also picked one coach to advance into the top two.: Jury of Peers' Pick: DJ Tambe; Judges's Pick: Anthony Michaels; Winner: DJ Tambe
