= Ink Master season 11 =

Ink Master: Grudge Match
- Season 11
- Hosted by: Dave Navarro
- Judges: Chris Núñez; Oliver Peck
- No. of contestants: 18
- Winner: Tony Medellin
- No. of episodes: 16

Release
- Original network: Paramount Network
- Original release: August 28 – December 18, 2018

Season chronology
- ← Previous; Return of the Masters Next → Battle of the Sexes

Ink Master: Grudge Match – Cleen vs. Christian is the eleventh season of the tattoo reality competition Ink Master that premiered on Paramount Network on August 28, instead of its original air date September 4, and concluded on December 18, 2018, with a total of 16 episodes. The show is hosted and judged by Jane's Addiction guitarist Dave Navarro, with accomplished tattoo artists Chris Núñez and Oliver Peck serving as series regular judges. The winner received $100,000, a feature in Inked magazine and the title of Ink Master.

The premise of this season was to have Ink Master veterans Christian Buckingham and James "Cleen Rock One" Steinke return to coach two teams of nine artists, similar to the premise of the previous season, and for them to settle their rivalry that began on the seventh season of the show. The live finale featured the final Grudge Match between the coaches where the number of artists that were left on their respective team gave each of them the power to sabotage each other, in which the winning coach would also receive $100,000.

The winner of the eleventh season of Ink Master was Tony Medellin, with Teej Poole being the runner-up. In addition, this is the only season to feature two Angel Face Off winners from Ink Master: Angels in the final two with Meddelin being the only winner to win both shows. The winner of the Grudge Match was James "Cleen Rock One" Steinke.

== Judging and ranking ==
=== Judging Panel ===
The judging panel is a table of three or more primary judges in addition to the coaches. The judges and the coaches make their final decision by voting to see who had best tattoo of the day, and who goes home.

=== Jury of Peers ===
Season 11 once again featured the jury of peers. But this time, the artist that wins best tattoo of the day gives their respective team the power to put up one artist for elimination.

== Contestants ==
The first episode featured 22 artists competing to be one of the 18 artists that were split into two teams of 9 artists. The top 14, who were chosen by the judges and the coaches in a blind critique, chose which team to be on while the remaining 8 artists that were not selected went head to head in the knockout round that determined who got the final spots on Team Christian and Team Cleen.

Names, experience, and cities stated are at time of filming.

Contestant Name	Years of experience	Hometown	Outcome
Tony Medellin	15	Reno, Nevada	Winner
Teej Poole	7	Charlotte, North Carolina	Runner-up
Tiffer Wright	11	Dallas, Texas	3rd place
Tim Stafford	5	Austin, Texas	4th place
Amanda Boone	6	Nashville, Tennessee	5th place
Chris Shockley	6	Clementon, New Jersey	6th place
Adam Turk	20	San Diego, California	7th place
Kyle Mackenzie	6	Malden, Massachusetts	8th place
Jess Cavazos	8	Corpus Christi, Texas	9th place
Jimmy "Snaz" Mackenzie	11	Boston, Massachusetts	10th place
Angel Rose Fergerstrom	2	Los Angeles, California	11th place
Austin Rose	10	Portland, Oregon	12th place
Stacy Smith	10	Charlotte, North Carolina	13th place
John Paul "JP" Roldan	9	Houston, Texas	14th place
Jamie Lee Parker	8	West Hills, California	15th place
Oba Jackson	2^{1/2}	Wilmington, Delaware	16th place (Note: Jackson withdrew from the competition due to medical reasons.)
Tiara Gordon	14	Lockport, New York	17th place
Kasey "Gonzo" Gonzalez	9	Baltimore, Maryland	18th place

=== Chosen ===
Team Christian
Amanda Boone
Jess Cavazos
Gonzo
Oba Jackson
TeeJ Poole (Note: Earned a spot on season 11 by defeating an Angel on the spin-off show Ink Master: Angels)
JP Roldan
Angel Rose
Chris Shockley
Tim Stafford

Team Cleen
Tiara Gordon
Kyle Mackenzie
Tony Medellin
Jamie Lee Parker
Austin Rose
Stacy Smith
Jimmy Snaz
Turk
Tiffer Wright

=== Not chosen ===
Contestant Name
De'Vonne Foxworth
Jennifer Love
Desiree "Desi" Mattivi
Matt Stebly

== Contestant progress ==
Indicates the contestant was a part of Team Christian. Indicates the contestant was a part of Team Cleen.

Contestant	Episode														
Contestant	2	3	4 (Note: Team Christian were exempt from elimination.)	5	6 (Note: Austin defeated Stacy in the Face-Off challenge to determine who would stay in the competition.)	7 (Note: Amanda, Tiffer, Tony and Turk were exempt from elimination. Kyle was among the top in the challenge, but was put in the bottom by the Jury of Peers.)	8	9 (Note: Jess and Tiffer were exempt from elimination.)	10 (Note: In this episode, none of the artists were able to surpass the coaches tattoos in the challenge, resulting in all of them being up for elimination.)	11	12	13 (Note: Amanda and Tim defeated Chris in the Knock-Out challenge to determine who would stay in the competition.)	14	15 (Note: Tiffer won Best Tattoo of the Day in the first round, Teej won Best Tattoo of the Day in the second round, and Tony won the Tattoo Marathon to advance to the finale.)	16
Tony Medellin	WIN	SAFE	HIGH	SAFE	SAFE	SAFE	SAFE	BTM3	BTM9	HIGH	TOP2	WIN	BTM3	WIN	Winner
Teej Poole	SAFE	SAFE	SAFE	BTM3	WIN	SAFE	SAFE	TOP2	BTM9	WIN	WIN	SAFE	TOP2	WIN	Runner-up
Tiffer Wright	TOP2	TOP2	WIN	WIN	SAFE	SAFE	WIN	SAFE	BTM9	SAFE	LOW	WIN	BTM3	WIN	Eliminated
Tim Stafford	SAFE	SAFE	SAFE	SAFE	WIN	SAFE	SAFE	SAFE	BTM9	BTM3	BTM3	BTM3	WIN	ELIM	Guest
Amanda Boone	HIGH	SAFE	SAFE	HIGH	WIN	SAFE	BTM3	BTM3	BTM9	BTM3	BTM3	BTM3	ELIM		Guest
Chris Shockley	SAFE	SAFE	SAFE	HIGH	WIN	WIN	HIGH	SAFE	BTM9	SAFE	SAFE	ELIM			Guest
Turk	SAFE	SAFE	BTM3	BTM3	SAFE	SAFE	LOW	WIN	BTM9	LOW	ELIM				Guest
Kyle Mackenzie	SAFE	WIN	HIGH	LOW	SAFE	BTM3	SAFE	SAFE	BTM9	ELIM					Guest
Jess Cavazos	SAFE	LOW	SAFE	SAFE	WIN	BTM3	HIGH	SAFE	ELIM						Guest
Jimmy Snaz	HIGH	HIGH	SAFE	HIGH	SAFE	SAFE	BTM3	ELIM							Guest
Angel Rose	HIGH	SAFE	SAFE	SAFE	WIN	LOW	ELIM								Guest
Austin Rose	BTM3	HIGH	LOW	SAFE	BTM2	ELIM									Guest
Stacy Smith	SAFE	SAFE	BTM3	SAFE	ELIM										Guest
JP Roldan	BTM3	BTM3	SAFE	ELIM											Guest
Jamie Lee Parker	SAFE	HIGH	ELIM												Guest
Oba Jackson	SAFE	BTM3	WDR												Guest
Tiara Gordon	HIGH	ELIM													Guest
Gonzo	ELIM														Guest

The contestant won Ink Master.
The contestant was the runner-up.
The contestant was eliminated during the finale.
The contestant won Best Tattoo of the Day.
The contestant won the Tattoo Marathon.
The contestant was among the top.
The contestant received positive critiques.
The contestant received negative critiques.
The contestant was in the bottom.
The contestant was put in the bottom by the Jury of Peers
The contestant was eliminated from the competition.
The contestant was put in the bottom by the Jury of Peers and was eliminated from the competition.
The contestant withdrew from the competition.
The contestant returned as a guest for that episode.

== Episodes ==
No. overall	No. in season	Title	Original release date	US viewers (millions)
140	1	"Opening Shots"	August 28, 2018	0.74
22 artists step into the ring at Gleason's Gym where they had six hours to create a tattoo in their choice subject while incorporating a style each coach is known for. Either Christian's specialty black and gray or Cleen's specialty new school. Afterwards, the judges and the coaches will judge each tattoo in a blind critique without knowing who did what. The top 14 artists will then pick who they want to be one. Team Christian got Angel, Chris, Oba, Jess, Gonzo, Tim, Teej and Amanda who were ranked first, third, eighth, ninth, eleventh, twelfth, thirteenth and fourteenth respectively. Team Clean on the other hand got second ranked artist Tiffer, followed by fourth ranked artist Tony, fifth ranked artist Tiara, sixth ranked artist Kyle, seventh ranked artist Jamie, and tenth ranked artist Turk. The remaining 8 artists face off one last time as one high ranked and their respective low ranked artist artist had five hours to tattoo against each other. The lower ranked artist will get to choose the style they must tattoo. The winner of each knockout round will pick the team of their choice. Jennifer and JP tattooed a traditional Japanese koi fish. Matt and Jimmy tried to create an American traditional female head. Desi and Austin bring a color illustrated female head to life. And Stacy and DeVonne try to do the same style as Jennifer and JP. JP completed Team Christian and because of this, the final three spots automatically go to Team Cleen with Jimmy, Austin and Stacy rounding out the team.
141	2	"Not on My Watch"	September 4, 2018	0.53
Skill of the Week: Fundamentals; Flash Challenge: For their first challenge, Team Cleen and Team Christian put their art fundamentals to the test by transforming shipping containers into graffiti masterpieces.; Winner: Team Cleen; Elimination Tattoo: It's a race against time in the first Elimination Tattoo as both teams must use their fundamentals by tattooing a clock.; Best Tattoo of the Day: Tony Medellin; Bottom: Gonzo, JP Roldan, and Austin Rose; Eliminated: Gonzo
142	3	"Right on Target"	September 11, 2018	0.65
Skill of the Week: Ingenuity; Flash Challenge: Using multicolored domino tiles, the two teams had six hours to create a piece of art that can impress the judges both upright and toppled over. The sibling argument between Kyle and Jimmy plus Austin's arrogance cause Team Cleen's piece to fall apart with only a few dominoes standing.; Winner: Team Christian; Elimination Tattoo: The artists have six hours to design a tattoo that uses individual objects to create a collective image.; Best Tattoo of the Day: Kyle Mackenzie; Bottom: Oba Jackson, Tiara Gordon, and JP Roldan; Eliminated: Tiara Gordon
143	4	"No Wrist, No Reward"	September 18, 2018	0.65
Skill of the Week: Consistency; Grudge Match: Cleen and Christian face off as they create a tattoo in the style and subject of their choice. Each round consisted a total of two hours. Since his team won the last elimination tattoo, Cleen picked a new school hot rod while Christian picked black-and-gray bats. The winner of the first grudge match will not only give the team an immunity from the elimination tattoo but will also form the jury of peers and put one artist from the opposing team up for elimination.; Winner: Christian Buckingham; Elimination Tattoo: Team Cleen wrap their consistency around the wrist by creating wristband tattoos. Christian assigned all the human canvases especially giving Turk and Jamie difficult canvases. Although Team Cleen was about to lose one member while the tattooing was happening, Team Christian lost one of their own after Oba informed his team he must withdraw from the competition as advised by his doctor due to the high blood pressure he was suffering which could've led to a heart attack.; Best Tattoo of the Day: Tiffer Wright; Bottom: Jamie Lee Parker, Stacy Smith and Turk; Elimination: Jamie Lee Parker
144	5	"That's Gonna Leave a Mark"	September 25, 2018	0.63
Skill of the Week: Creativity; Flash Challenge: On a 10 foot by 24 foot canvas, the two teams must use electric tape to create a piece of art in only six hours.; Winner: Team Christian; Elimination Tattoo: The teams tried to coverup a canvas' design that's placed on a spot that is difficult to tattoo.; Best Tattoo of the Day: Tiffer Wright; Bottom: JP Roldan, Teej Poole and Turk; Elimination: JP Roldan
145	6	"Fight Your Own Battles"	October 2, 2018	0.60
Skill of the Week: Adaptability; Tag Team Tattoo: Two artists must tag team their respective partner every hour while tattooing an epic battle onto a human canvas at the same time. In addition, one team will be safe and the other will be put up for elimination.; Best Tattoo of the Day: Team Christian; Following the critique, Cleen tries to weed out the weak on his own by choosing the two weakest links. Team Cleen got into an intense argument that caused Tiffer to leave for a little bit. Amanda and Tim convinced Cleen to put up Stacy and Austin because they have been the big problem on his team ever since he got stuck with them. Cleen ultimately chose Stacy and Austin as his two weakest links.: Face Off Tattoo: The next day, Stacy and Austin fight to save themselves when they had six hours to tattoo a full-colored biomechanical skull, chosen by Christian.; Eliminated: Stacy Smith
146	7	"No Wasted Space"	October 9, 2018	0.57
Skill of the Week: Technical Application; Grudge Match: In the second grudge match, the coaches competed in a head-to-head marathon by doing four tattoos with each round consisting of one hour. Both teams picked what the coaches must tattoo; with Team Christian picking a color-realistic strawberry and geometric wolf head and Team Cleen picking a traditional panther head and graffiti lettering. Whichever coach won their respective tattoo, they could pick one artist from their team to be safe from elimination. In the end, Tiffer, Tony and Turk were safe on Team Cleen, and Amanda was safe on Team Christian.; Elimination Tattoo: The teams tried to create a galaxy themed tattoo out of an everyday object. Tiffer, Tony, Turk and Amanda assigned all the human canvases.; Best Tattoo of the Day: Chris Shockley; Bottom: Kyle Mackenzie, Austin Rose and Jess Cavazos; Eliminated: Austin Rose
147	8	"Chalk This Way"	October 16, 2018	0.53
Skill of the Week: Dimension; Flash Challenge: The teams had six hours draw a 3D sidewalk design using only chalk.; Winner: Team Cleen; Elimination Tattoo: The remaining artists try to create a naturescape tattoo which proved to be too difficult for some. Cleen picked Jimmy and Tony to assign the human canvases.; Best Tattoo of the Day: Tiffer Wright; Bottom: Angel Rose, Jimmy Snaz and Amanda Boone; Eliminated: Angel Rose
148	9	"Tipping the Scales"	October 23, 2018	0.60
Skill of the Week: Artistry; Grudge Match: The coaches each tattoo each other's designs only using a stencil provided by each other. Christian provides a female face and Cleen a demonic face. They each win their own tattoo designs. Jess Cavazos is safe from Team Christian and Tiffer Wright from Team Cleen.; Elimination Tattoo: The artists tattoo mermaids. Jess and Tiffer assign the canvases as the safe artists.; Best Tattoo of the Day: Turk; Bottom: Tony Medellin, Jimmy Snaz and Amanda Boone; Eliminated: Jimmy Snaz
149	10	"Put Up or Shut Up"	October 30, 2018	0.67
Skill of the Week: Finesse; Elimination Tattoo: Each team had to tattoo a design created by the opposing coach and attempt to match or surpass the coach. Christian designed a demonic woman with horns and dictated that the tattoo be done in black and grey and that no liner be used, only a mag needle. Cleen designed a tattoo machine, with needles, and a skull and asked that the tattoo be done in full color in his style. None of the artists managed to surpass the coaches tattoos and no one was safe from elimination.; Face Off Tattoo: Each artist had to tattoo a freehand design to save themselves from elimination.; Eliminated: Jess Cavazos
150	11	"In Deep Waters"	November 13, 2018	0.52
Skill of the Week: Composition; Flash Challenge: The artists had five hours to compose an incredible work of art by stenciling the design on a concrete board before using invisible water repellent paint. They will then reveal their masterpiece after wetting it. Nuñez was not present to co-judge this flash challenge.; Winner: Team Christian; Elimination Tattoo: The teams try to compose a Japanese temples by getting every little detail they can. Christian, in addition to picking Teej and Tim to assign the human canvases, targets Kyle once again and tries to pull out all the stops to manipulate Team Cleen.; Best Tattoo of the Day: Teej Poole; Bottom: Amanda Boone, Kyle Mackenzie and Tim Stafford; Eliminated: Kyle Mackenzie
151	12	"Too Hot to Handle"	November 20, 2018	0.68
Skill of the Week: Detail; Flash Challenge: Each team had six hours to burn a design on to a large sheet of wood.; Winner: Team Cleen; Elimination Tattoo: The final seven must capture a ton of detail in their reflection tattoo. Cleen picked Tiffer and Turk to assign the human canvases.; Best Tattoo of the Day: Teej Poole; Bottom: Turk, Tim Stafford and Amanda Boone; Eliminated: Turk
152	13	"Who's Got the Power?"	November 27, 2018	0.72
Tag Team Tattoo: Tattooing the same canvas at the same time, the coaches and their respective teammates tag team every hour by creating a tattoo that represents power. Chris' argument with his teammates caused Team Christian to blackout.; Winner: Team Cleen; Grudge Match Face Off: Team Cleen earned more power from winning the tag team tattoo. Each member picked the artist from Team Christian in addition to the style and subject for their respective head to head grudge match. Cleen will pick the style and subject for the artists who were not chosen by his teammates. Tiffer chose Amanda to tattoo illustrative cat heads in a motorcycle head, and Tony and Tim tattoo an American traditional cobra with a dagger while Teej and Chris tattooed a photo realistic full-colored full-bodied copperhead snake.; Knock Out Tattoo: Amanda, Chris and Tim must bring their A-game as they square off against each other for six hours. Cleen assigned all three of them to tattoo a color realistic bouquet of flowers.; Eliminated: Chris Shockley
153	14	"What Are Your Crayon About?"	December 4, 2018	0.67
Skill of the Week: Precision; Flash Challenge: The teams had seven hours to create a design an image by stacking 200,000 crayons.; Winner: Team Christian; Elimination Tattoo: The final five tattoo animal portraits. Christian picked Amanda and Teej to assign the human canvases.; Best Tattoo of the Day: Tim Stafford; Bottom: Tony Medellin, Amanda Boone and Tiffer Wright; Eliminated: Amanda Boone
154	15	"Prelude to a Bloodbath"	December 11, 2018	0.66
First Round: Before Cleen and Christian fight one last time, the final sabotage each other with a spot in the finale on the line. One artist will call the shots by creating a six-hour line-work tattoo while the artist who was called out must tattoo the design. Teej picked one skull that revealed the X on the bottom and called out his teammate Tim who calls out Tony. Tony then calls out his fellow Team Cleen member Tiffer who designed Teej's tattoo.; Winner: Tiffer Wright; Second Round: In the second round for a spot in the finale, the artists have to tattoo their own line-drawing.; Winner: Teej Poole; Third Round: To win the last spot, the artists have to endure a tattoo marathon: three 90 minutes tattoos, every single one in a different style called by the finalists and the judges.; Winner: Tony Medellin; Eliminated: Tim Stafford
155	16	"Grudge Match Finale"	December 18, 2018	0.68
Jury of Peers' Pick: Teej Poole; Judges' Pick: Tony Medellin; 3rd Place: Tiffer Wright; Winner: Tony Medellin; Grudge Match Winner: Cleen Rock One
