= Security preparations for the inauguration of Joe Biden =

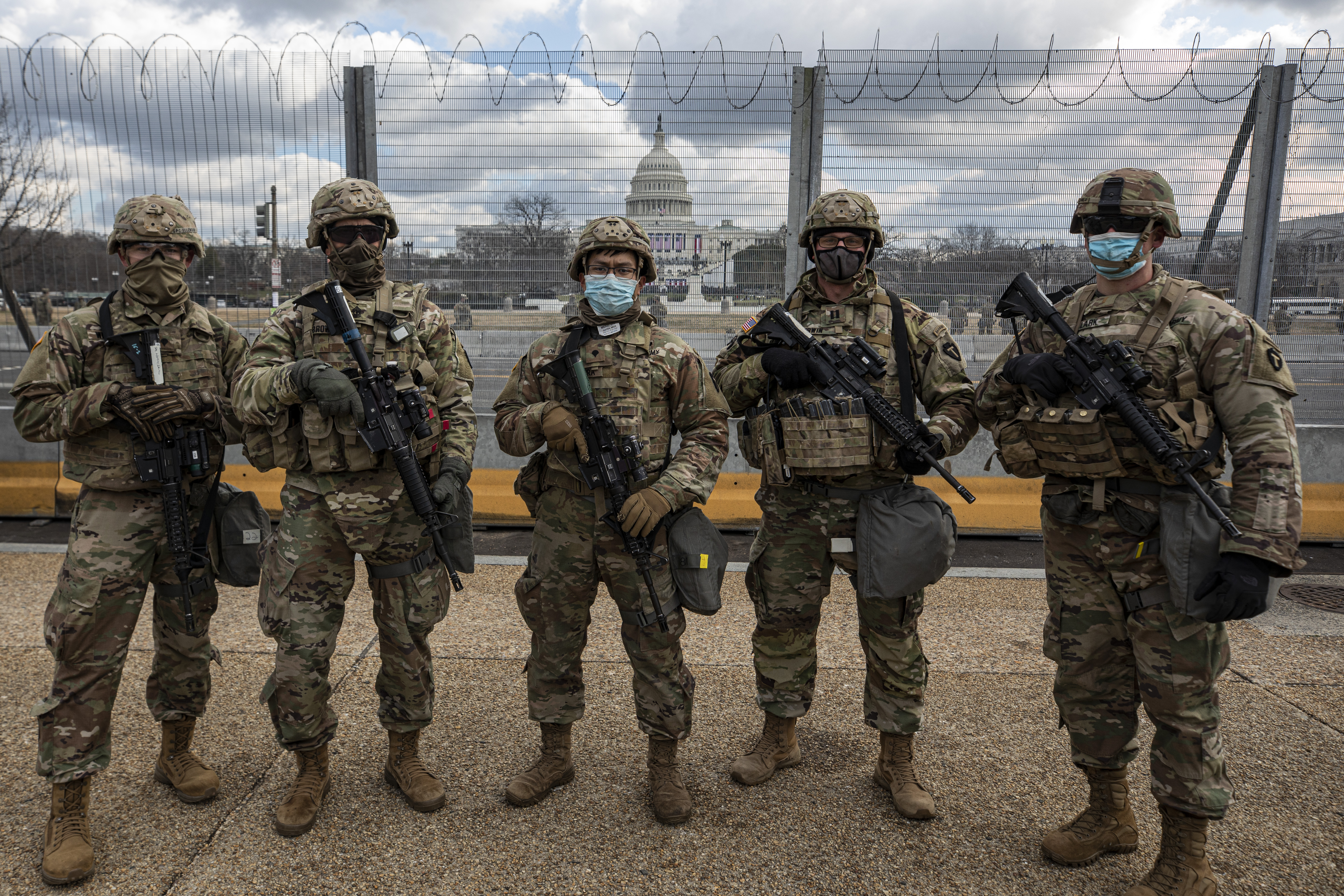
Members of the National Guard guard the inauguration on January 20

The storming of the United States Capitol on January 6, 2021, raised concerns about the security of the inauguration of Joe Biden two weeks later on January 20, 2021. The inauguration, like all ceremonies since the first inauguration of George W. Bush in 2001, was designated a National Special Security Event (NSSE); however, on this occasion, the week preceding it was included in preparations. Biden chose not to move the ceremony indoors, indicating that he believed a public, outdoor ceremony was necessary to demonstrate strength. Former Homeland Security Advisor Lisa Monaco advised the Biden team on security-related matters for the ceremony.

== Secret Service ==
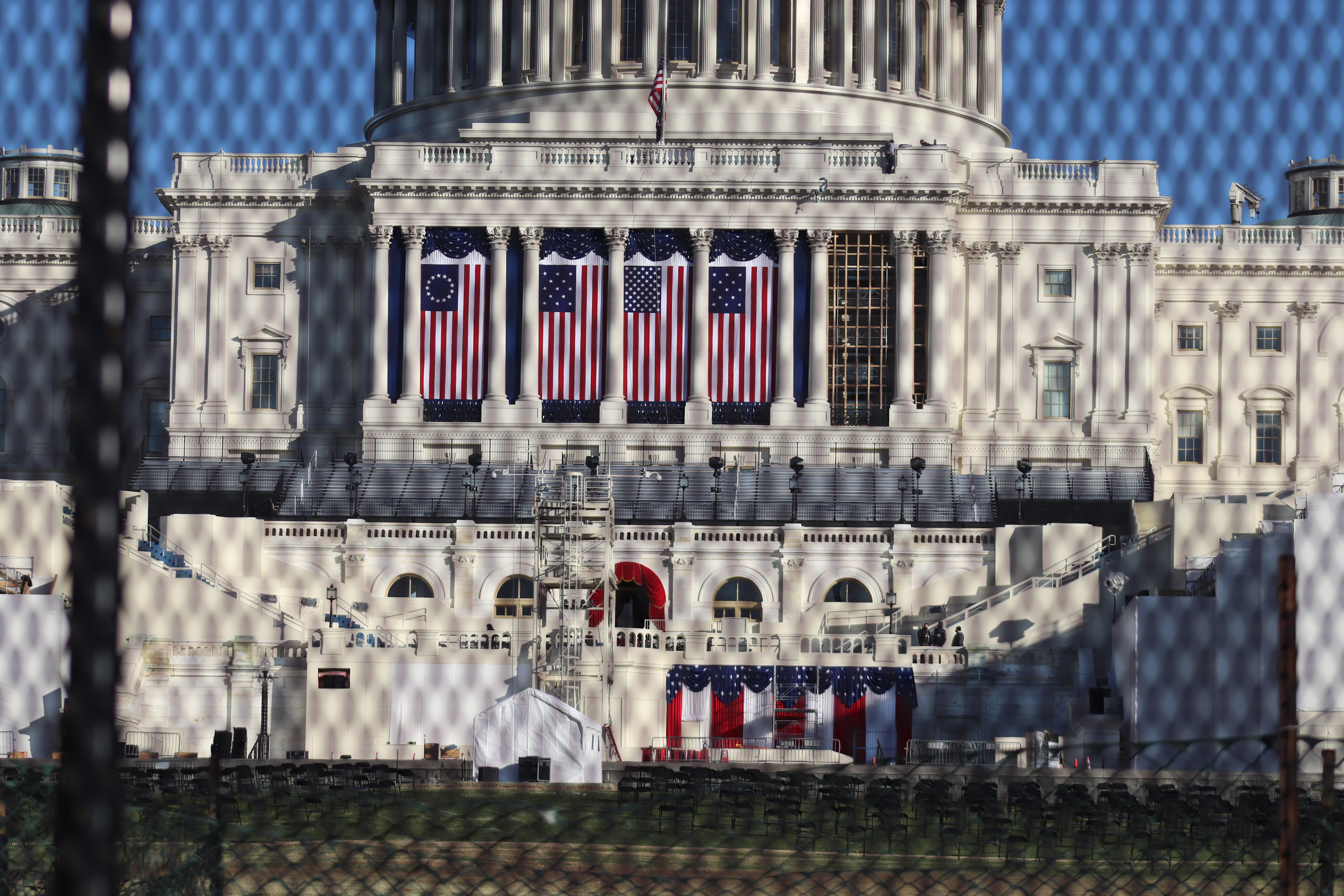
The inaugural platform from behind riot barriers, eight days before the inauguration

Following the attack and reports of subsequent threats to disrupt Biden's inauguration and incite nationwide unrest, the Secret Service launched a security operation that surpassed any in modern U.S. history with the aim of avoiding a repeat of the deadly Capitol riot. On January 11, Trump approved a request for an emergency declaration in Washington, D.C., allowing federal assistance through FEMA to help secure the event. On January 14, a thirteen-page "joint threat assessment" was issued by the FBI, Department of Homeland Security, and other federal and local agencies, identifying domestic extremist groups as "the most likely threat" to the inauguration, followed by foreign influence operations to inflame tensions and drone attacks. Separately, the FBI warned that far-right extremists had discussed impersonating National Guard members to infiltrate the ceremony, though later vetting of troops only led to the removal of twelve members from duty for presenting various potential "security liabilities".

On the same day, the Secret Service established a Multi-Agency Command Center (MACC) to coordinate inauguration security—established six days earlier than planned—composed of agents and representatives from many government agencies (such as the FBI, U.S. Marshals Service, Defense Department, Park Police, and D.C. Metro Police) and private companies (including a gas company, CSX railroad, and Amtrak). At the request of D.C. Metro Police, the Marshals Service assisted with inauguration security, and planned to deputize up to 4,000 local law enforcement officers from across the nation to assist. Mesh fencing and barriers that were previously installed for the construction of the inaugural stage were torn down in the riot, and rehearsals for the ceremony, originally set for January 17, were postponed until January 19, citing security concerns. "Non-scalable" seven foot-high crowd control barriers with razor wire atop them and jersey barriers were installed around the perimeter of the Capitol grounds to prevent disruptions during the ceremony and deconstruction of the platform.

== Operation Capitol Response ==
The activation of National Guard forces into D.C. was a logistically challenging operation, with members arriving from all 50 states, three territories, and the District of Columbia itself. Commanded by Major General William J. Walker of the D.C. National Guard, troops were assigned various duties, including traffic and crowd control and grounds patrol. Arriving troops were required to undergo COVID-19 questionnaire screenings, but few were required to take COVID-19 tests for clearance to join the mission.

National Guard troops in D.C.
Date	National Guard troops on duty in DC (est.)
Jan. 14	7,000
Jan. 16 (morning)	10,000
Jan. 17 (morning)	16,500
Jan. 18 (evening)	21,500
Jan. 19 (morning)	25,000

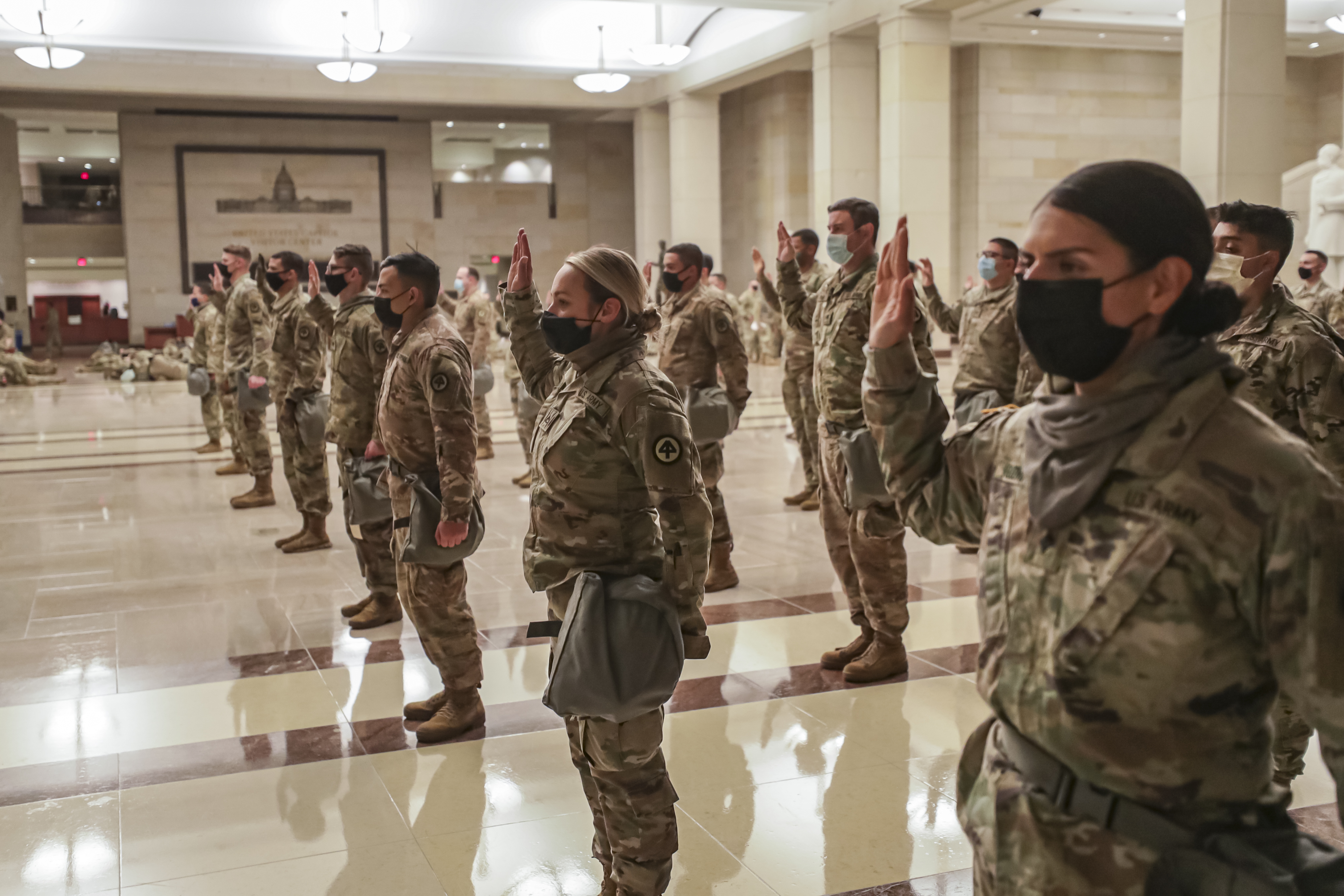
NJ National Guard Troops deployed inside the Capitol, pictured during the swearing-in on January 12th

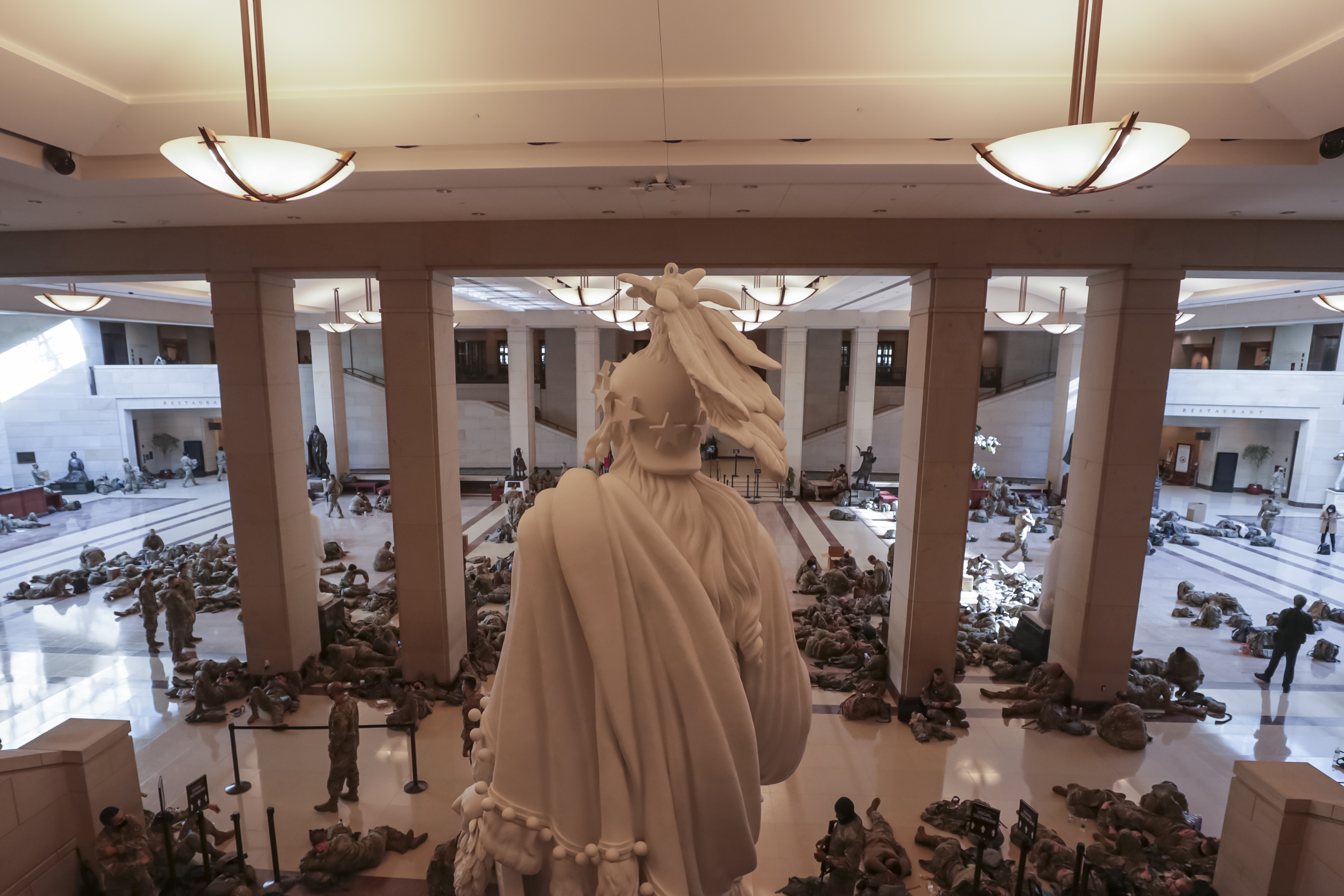
Due to lack of cots, troops inside the Capitol had to sleep on the floor, attracting significant media attention

National Guard forces increased steadily in the days leading up to the inauguration, and the authorized maximum of 25,000 troops was reached on the eve of Inauguration Day—three times the number activated for recent ceremonies. The total number of troops in the city may have been the highest since the American Civil War—comparable to that during Abraham Lincoln's first inauguration, which also featured an increased military presence—and surpassed the 13,000 guardsmen deployed during the 1968 riots. Thousands rested in Emancipation Hall of the Capitol Visitor Center. While most state governors and adjutant generals agreed to requests from the Defense Department officials to send additional troops, some governors declined, desiring to retain capability to defend their own state capitols.

=== Active-duty operations ===
In addition to the National Guard troops, the Defense Department assigned an estimated 2,750 active-duty personnel in support of inaugural operations; about 2,000 to perform ceremonial duties (military bands, color guards, salute-gun battery, sentries, and ushers) and the remaining 750 in specialized units (including CBRN defenses, bomb squads, logistics and communications personnel, and medical personnel). Aircraft and watercraft, including U.S. Coast Guard cutters and U.S. Air Force fighter jets, patrolled the water and air.

== Aviation security, travel restrictions and site closures ==
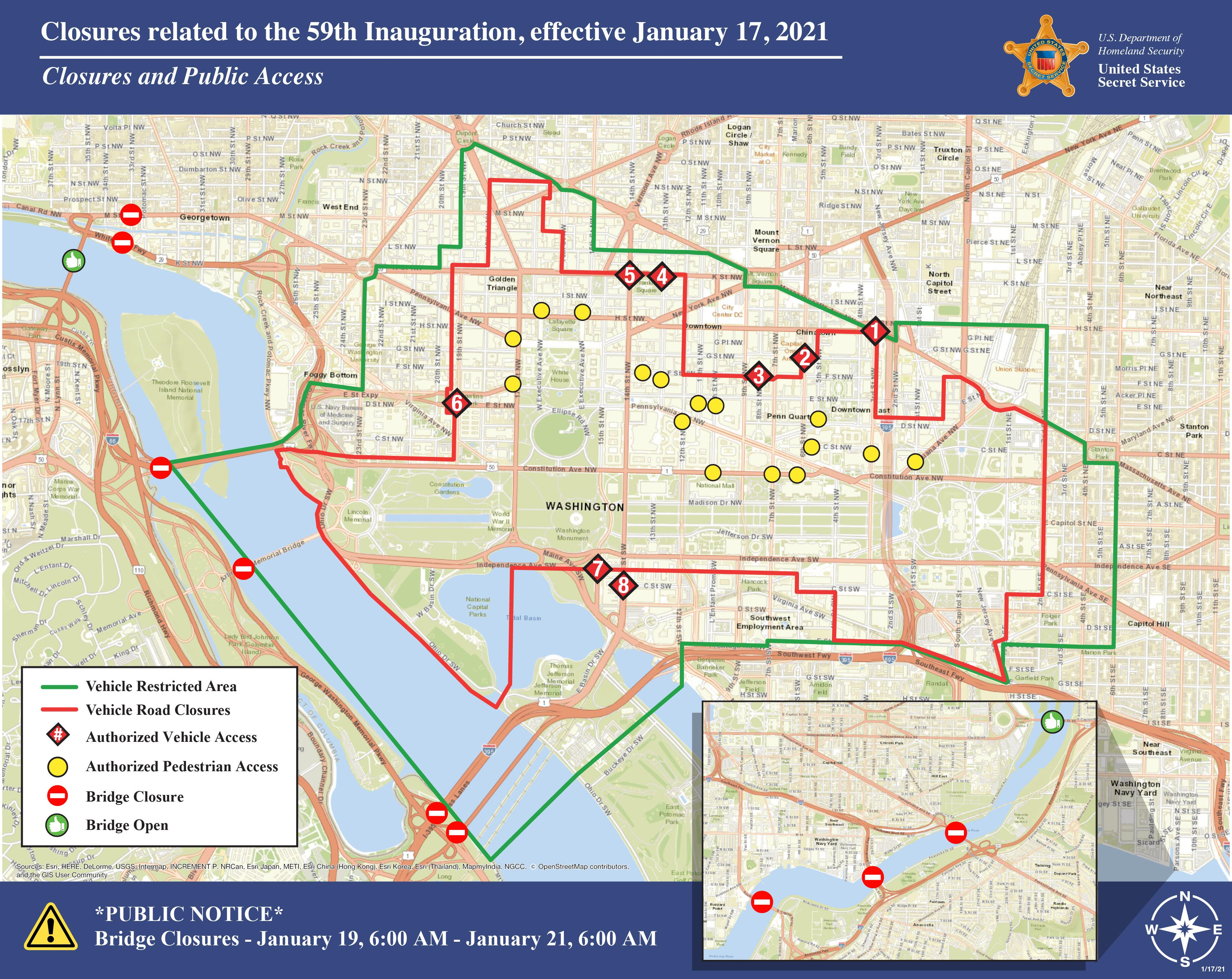
Security-related site restrictions in and around the National Mall, Southwest D.C., Capitol Hill, and downtown Washington, D.C., on Inauguration Day

Ahead of the inauguration, the Transportation Security Administration increased aviation security at the three D.C.-area airports, increasing the use of random gate screenings, explosive detection dogs, and federal air marshals. Washington, D.C.-area airspace (which is ordinarily highly restricted) was even more tightly controlled.

Organizers and officials made an unprecedented effort to deter people from visiting Washington, D.C. during the week of the inauguration over concerns of political violence. Efforts included:

- D.C. Mayor Muriel Bowser urged tourists not to visit the city, and the Office of Personnel Management asked federal agencies to allow federal employees to work remotely.
- The National Mall, which served as a non-ticketed viewing area in past ceremonies, and Washington Monument at its geographic center, were closed to the public. Much of the surrounding downtown area near Capitol Hill, Union Station, the Lincoln Memorial, and White House came under significant parking restrictions and road closures.
- The Washington Metro closed thirteen Metrorail stations; the stations that remained in operation ran on a Saturday schedule. Metrobus service was also modified, with routes changed due to the security perimeter.
- MARC Train and Virginia Railway Express commuter rail service from suburban Maryland and Virginia were suspended. Amtrak issued a travel advisory and increased security, halting Northeast Regional service.
- The U.S. Postal Service temporarily removed or locked public post boxes and suspended mail collection in Washington and several major U.S. cities to "protect postal property, employees, and the public".
- Airbnb canceled all reservations in the city, major airlines banned incoming travelers from checking firearms on board, a local hotel workers' union called on hotels to restrict guests to those providing inauguration security, and many parking garages around the Capitol were closed.
- The Commonwealth of Virginia closed four bridges connecting to D.C.—Theodore Roosevelt, Arlington Memorial, Interstate 395, and 14th Street. A stretch of 10 miles (16 km) of the Potomac River between the Francis Scott Key Bridge and the Woodrow Wilson Memorial Bridge was closed to marine traffic.
- The House Oversight Committee asked 27 transportation and hotel companies, including Avis, Hertz, Marriott, and Hyatt, to implement screening procedures to prevent the use of their services by domestic terrorists targeting the inauguration.

== Incidents prior to inauguration ==
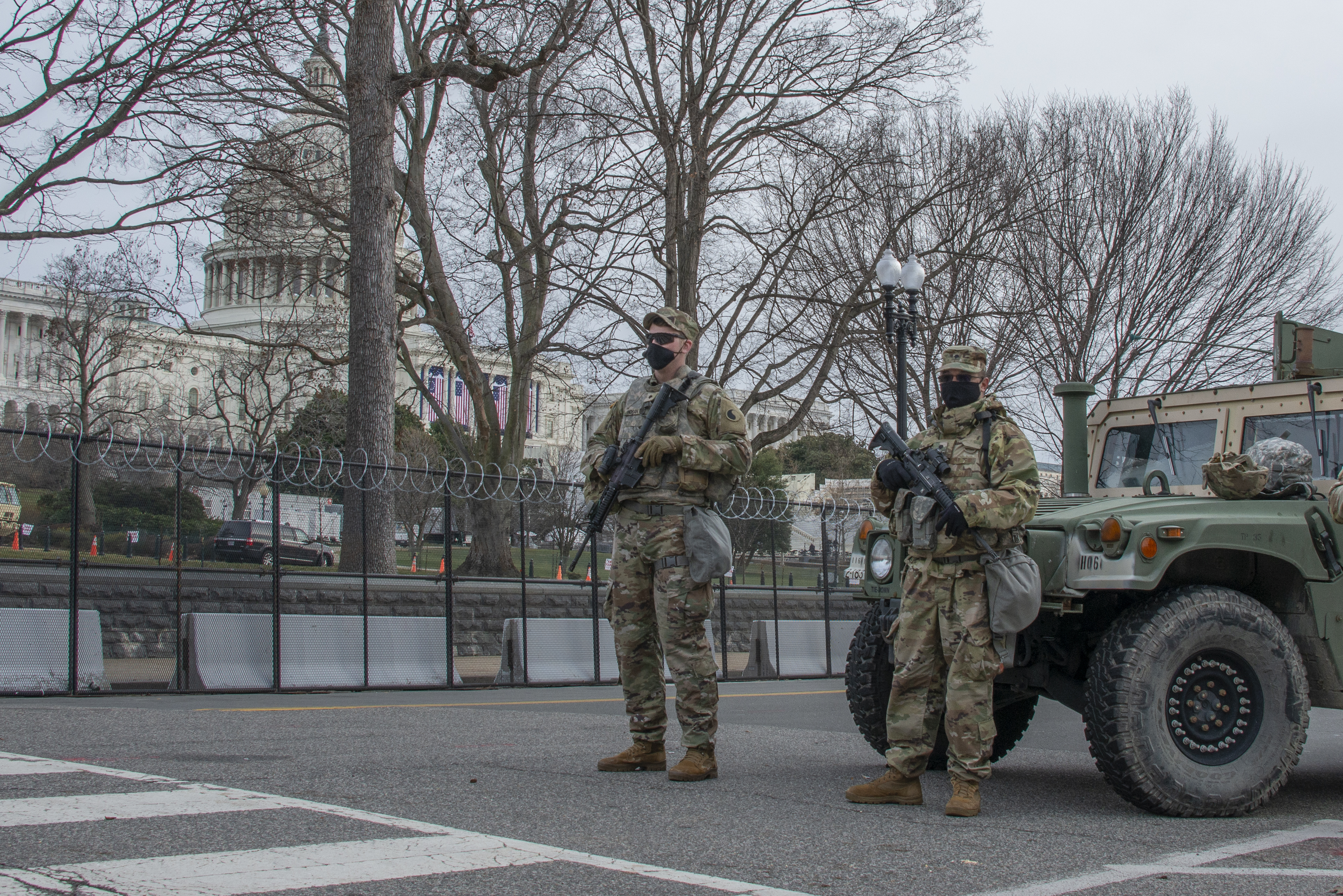
Soldiers with the Virginia National Guard on January 16

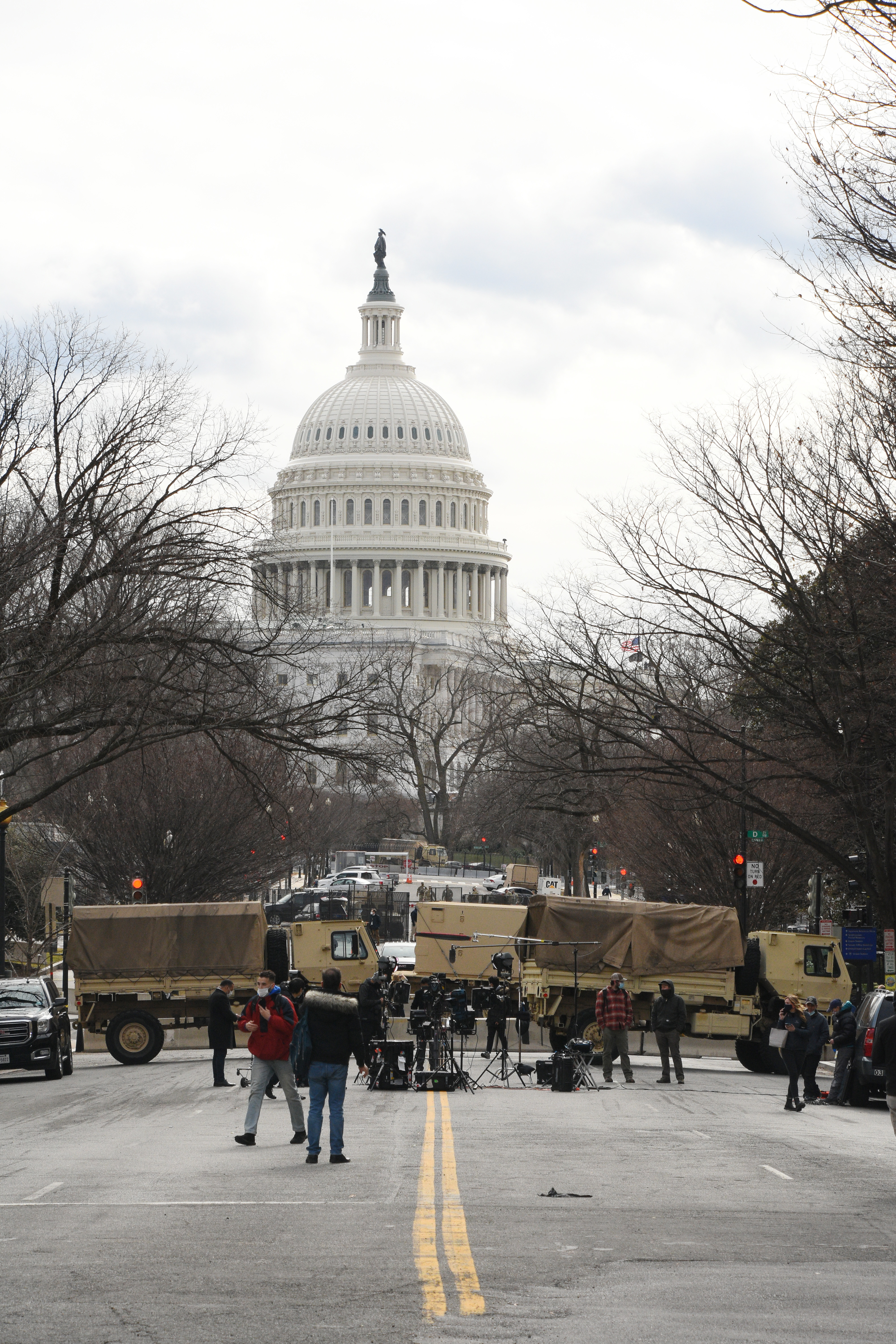
Armoured FMTV trucks of the National Guard on a road block on January 18

On January 15, Capitol Police arrested a 31-year-old man claiming to be a private security guard from Front Royal, Virginia, who attempted to access a restricted area on the Capitol grounds carrying an "unauthorized" inauguration credential. After inspection, he was charged with carrying an unregistered pistol, more than 500 rounds of unregistered ammunition, and two dozen shotgun shells. He stated that he had forgotten to remove the weapons from his vehicle before arriving in D.C. and used the credential he was granted. He was not found to be tied to extremism, but was instructed not to visit the city during the inaugural events except for court proceedings.

On January 17, a 22-year-old avowed Trump supporter from Gordonsville, Virginia, was arrested near the Capitol complex; he was charged with carrying an unlicensed Glock 22 handgun, three high-capacity magazines, and 37 rounds of unregistered ammunition. In a separate incident the same day, a 63-year-old woman from Stratford, Connecticut, claiming to be a law enforcement officer and "a part of the presidential cabinet" was stopped by Capitol Police at a checkpoint near Union Station. She fled from police, was arrested, underwent a psychiatric examination, and was subsequently charged with impersonating, failing to obey, and fleeing an officer. Also on January 17, Couy Griffin, an Otero County, New Mexico, county commissioner and founder of the "Cowboys for Trump" group, was arrested in D.C. Griffin had participated in the storming of the Capitol and vowed to return to the city to hold a rally that would end with "blood running out of" the Capitol. Griffin was charged with knowingly entering or remaining in a restricted building without lawful authority.

On January 18, the Capitol complex, where a dress rehearsal for the ceremony was due to take place, was evacuated due to a fire at a homeless encampment outside in the 100 block of H Street SE, to which D.C. Fire and EMS responded. A public address system alerted people on the Capitol grounds, and members of Congress were advised to shelter-in-place via email. A military band and individuals standing in as participants in the inaugural ceremony were forced to evacuate the inaugural platform. The small fire was promptly extinguished and caused one non-life-threatening injury. The blaze produced a cloud of smoke that was visible over the Capitol.

== Inauguration Day and aftermath ==
There were no sightings of pro-Trump crowds at Biden's inauguration, which was reported as being "quiet and calm". The U.S. Supreme Court received a bomb threat, which caused the building to be cleared and investigated.

=== Removal of the fencing ===
The network of various barriers and fencing in the streets was subsequently removed. However, the 7 foot riot fence on the Capitol grounds was slated to remain in place for at least 30 days. Acting U.S. Capitol Police chief Yogananda Pittman said that permanent fencing was needed around the U.S. Capitol. This idea was controversial, and DC Mayor Muriel Bowser and some politicians in both parties objected. Dissatisfaction was expressed with the perception of the Capitol as not "open to the people". The fence and tight security around the U.S. Capitol building caused problems for the government of the District of Columbia, who had trouble gaining entry to hand deliver their city bills to the U.S. Congress for approval. Aspects of prolonged heightening of security have been characterized as security theater, by individual lawmakers and observers. In July, it was announced that the riot fence is scheduled for rapid dismantling, with improved security conditions cited as a reason.

However, in September, the fence was reinstalled as part of the preparations for the Justice for J6 rally.

=== National Guard departures ===
In the early afternoon of January 21, the Capitol Police ordered all 3,500 members of the National Guard stationed in the Capitol and congressional office buildings to relocate to the Thurgood Marshall Federal Judiciary Building parking garage due to increased indoor foot traffic in hallways and open spaces as Congress reconvened. The garage was lit and heated but lacked sufficient amenities for the thousands told to occupy the space. The move was widely criticized by members of Congress and later reversed. Yogananda Pittman, acting chief of the Capitol Police, shortened the troops' shifts so to reduce the need for sleeping accommodations within the Capitol.

After the inauguration, the National Guard began to wind-down operations, checking-in equipment, arranging travel plans, and testing for COVID-19. Most troops returned home within the following week, but approximately 7,000 remained through the end of the month to continue securing the city. 5,000 members who patrolled the Capitol remained active until late March following concerns that unrest may arise during the second impeachment trial of Donald Trump, which began and concluded in February, and around Biden's first State of the Union address to a joint session of Congress. This number was reduced to 2,200 by the end of March, and the National Guard security mission at the U.S. Capitol concluded on May 23.
