= Gleason's Gym =

Boxing gym

Coordinates: 40.703075°N 73.988972°W

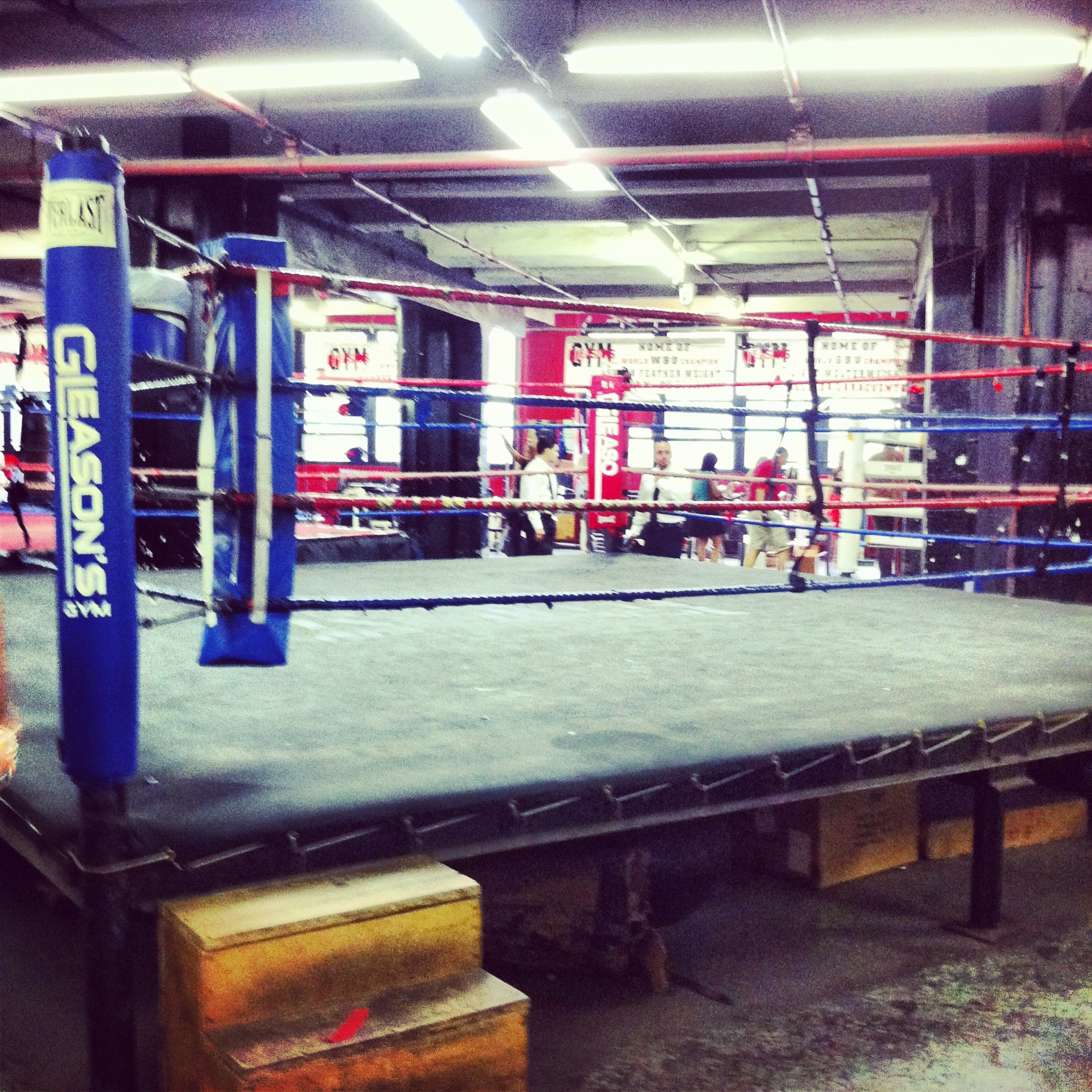
Boxing ring at Gleason's Gym, 2012.

Gleason's is a boxing gym located on the Brooklyn waterfront. The gym was founded by Peter Gagliardi, a former bantamweight, who changed his name to Bobby Gleason. It moved to Manhattan and then to Brooklyn. Gleason's is now owned by Bruce Silverglade.

There is an illustrated book called At Gleason's Gym. Owner Bruce Silverglade and Gleason's trainer Hector Roca co-authored the book The Gleason's Gym: Total Body Boxing Workout for Women, with a foreword by actor Hilary Swank (she famously thanked Hector Roca when she received her Oscar for her role in the boxing movie "Million Dollar Baby"). There is a book called White Collar Boxing: One Man's Journey from the Office to the Ring, in which John E. Oden describes Gleason's Gym in Chapter 6.

In 2015, part of episode 18, season 4, of the television comedy show "Impractical Jokers" took place at the gym.

The Season 11 premiere of Ink Master filmed the gym which was used as the location where 22 artists competed to earn a spot on Team Cleen or Team Christian by tattooing a subject in one of the coaches' specialties for six hours.

Gleason's Gym has reached out to the trans community by hosting the Trans Boxing club led by coach Nolan Hanson.

On August 21, 2024, a street sign was dedicated to Gleason's Gym. The corner of Water and Adams streets was officially named "Gleason's Gym Way" during a special ceremony held that day.
