= The Tattoo Shop =

- Genre: Reality
- Starring: Ami James; Chris Nunez; Chris Garver; Darren Brass; Tommy Montoya
- Country of origin: United States
- Original language: English
- No. of seasons: 1
- No. of episodes: 8

Production
- Executive producers: Ryan Duffy; Kevin Johnston
- Running time: 13–16 minutes
- Production companies: Tattoodo; Drive Studios

Original release
- Network: Facebook Watch
- Release: March 15 – May 3, 2018

The Tattoo Shop is an American reality show series that premiered on March 15, 2018 on Facebook Watch. It follows a group of tattoo artists as they open up a new shop in Miami, Florida.

The show airs two episodes per week, with Thursdays offering a behind-the-scenes look into the lives of the artists and their clients. Friday's episodes feature a live tattoo experience on "Mystery Tattoo". Each week, a client agrees to get a tattoo, sight unseen. This tattoo is left in the hands of the Facebook community, who make the creative decisions on the design and where the art is drawn on the body.

== Premise ==
The Tattoo Shop follows "renowned inksters Ami James, Chris Nunez, Chris Garver, Darren Brass, and Tommy Montoya as they open their new tattoo shop, Liberty City Tattoo, in Wynwood, Miami."

== Production ==
=== Development ===
On March 9, 2018, it was announced that Facebook Watch had ordered a first season of The Tattoo Shop, a new reality series featuring the stars of Miami Ink and NY Ink. The featured tattoo artists include Ami James, Chris Nunez, Chris Garver, Darren Brass, and Tommy Montoya. Kevin Johnston is set to act as showrunner for the series and executive produce alongside Ryan Duffy.

=== Marketing ===
Simultaneously with the initial series announcement, Facebook released a trailer for the first season of the show.

== Episodes ==
No.	Title	Original release date
1	"Ink Like Wine"	March 15, 2018
2	"Is That a Coconut?"	March 22, 2018
3	"Wolf Slobber"	March 29, 2018
4	"The Sicilian Volcano"	April 5, 2018
5	"Point Break"	April 12, 2018
6	"Tommy Gun"	April 19, 2018
7	"In Our Blood"	April 26, 2018
8	"Old Friends"	May 3, 2018

== See also ==
- List of original programs distributed by Facebook Watch
