= David Roma =

American film producer

David Roma is a television producer, filmmaker, musician and activist, born in 1974. The son of 1950s and 1960s Capitol Records recording artist Frank Roma and grandson of a classical pianist, David spent his early years until the age of 21 developing a career as a concert pianist before leaving his pursuit in 1996 to become a writer, producer and director of films and television shows. David has performed live around the world and has produced beats for members of the Wu-Tang Clan and composed the music for many of his TV shows.

== Biography ==
After attending the Juilliard School, he worked with videographer Don Munroe, who directed Andy Warhol's 15 Minutes, and other multi-media projects that were spawned from The Factory. Roma has gone on to become a producer and contributor to TV franchises and has worked with various networks and studios, including FX (TV network), E!, Fuse TV, Discovery Channel, TLC (TV channel), VH1, Independent Film Channel and HBO.

After two of his pit bulls jumped from the roof of a building he was inspired to produce a documentary, Off The Chain, that exposes the world of dog fighting. The documentary was part of a 1st Amendment supreme court hearing where Justice Sonia Sotomayor debated the legality of the film's violent imagery. It was decided in the Supreme Court that if the filmmakers' intent is for awareness or education, it is legal. David's first feature narrative was a Bollywood/Hollywood crossover film in a partnership with Saregama, entitled Karma, Confessions, and Holi.

During 2006 and 2007, he directed the pilot and first season of Miami Ink which went on to shoot over 100 episodes and had several spin-offs. He reunited with Original Media founder Charlie Corwin once again to create and executive produce Dirt Demons for Fuse TV. Roma has gone on to create several TV franchises including co-creating along with Snoop Dogg a reality sitcom about the rapper and his family life entitled Snoop Dogg's Father Hood, which aired 2 seasons on E!. The show was a co-production between Roma and E! studios.

In late 2010, David began working with Josh Fox to produce the feature-length documentary Gasland. The film was accepted into competition in the 2010 Sundance Film Festival and won the Special Jury Prize. In 2011, the film won an Emmy as well as being nominated for an Oscar for the 2011 Academy Awards.

In 2018, Roma launched a production company, Polymath Group. They have produced one feature documentary that Roma directed.

== Filmography ==
- 2002 Bridge and Tunnel (Writer & Director)
- 2002 American Rap Stars (Executive Producer)
- 2004 Biker Buildoff (Writer, Producer, & Director)
- 2004 Rocked with Gina Gershon (Director)
- 2005 Female American Rap Stars (Producer & Director)
- 2005 Miami Ink TV (Producer & Director)
- 2006 Off the Chain (Producer)
- 2007 Karma Confessions and Holi (Producer & Co-Director)
- 2007 Hogan Knows Best TV (Series Producer & Director)
- 2007 Dirt Demons TV:Crusty Demons (Executive Producer)
- 2008 Street Hunters (Executive Producer & Director)
- 2008 Snoop Dogg's Father Hood TV (Executive Producer)
- 2008 30 Days TV (Producer)
- 2009 King Of Clubs TV Executive Producer
- 2010 Gasland (co-producer)
- 2010 Peep Show Revealed (Director)
- 2011 Selling New York (Director)
- 2011 NY Ink (co-producer)
- 2012 Indians & Cowboys (Writer, Producer, Director)
- 2014 Biker Battleground Phoenix (Supervising Producer)
- 2018 United We Stand (Director/Producer)
- 2022 You Can't Cancel Me (Director)

== Music videos ==
- The Girls Attractive - Diamond Nights
- Mi Corazon - Fun Lovin Criminals
- Universal Soldier - Prodigal Sunn of the Sunz of Man
- There Goes My Baby -Charlie Wilson of the Gap Band

== Discography ==
- 2005 "Love is Love", (P Sunn). Wutang - Keyboards
- 2005 "Off The Chain" (Sunzini). Sunzini of Man - Keyboards
- 1988 "I Wanna Love" (Frank Roma) composer
