= Luke Wessman =

American tattoo artist and designer

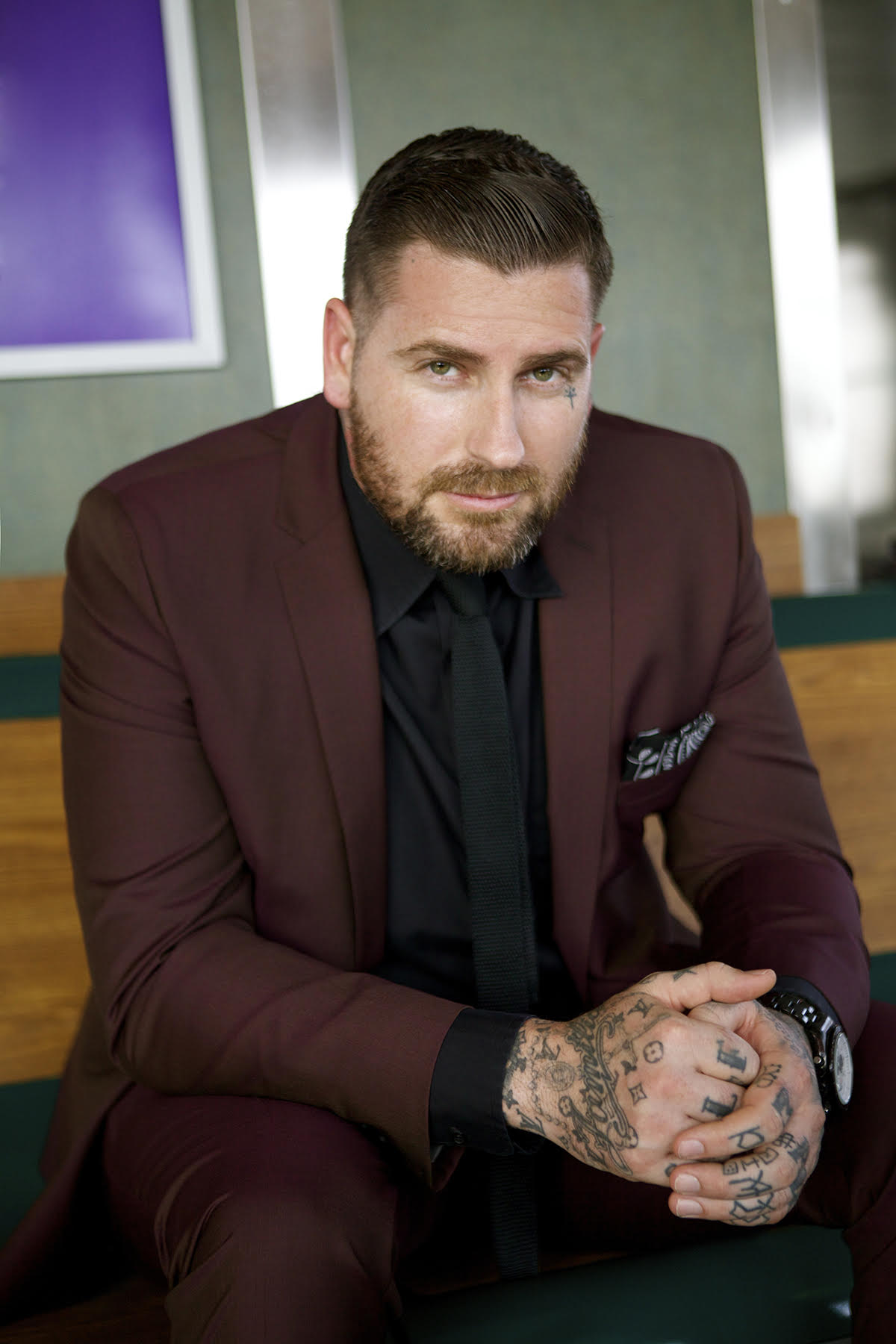
- Born: Summertown, Tennessee
- Occupation(s): Tattoo Artist, Designer, Television Personality
- Style: Gangster Traditional
- Website: lukewessman.com

Luke Wessman is an American tattoo artist and designer. He was featured on the TLC reality shows Miami Ink and NY Ink.

== Early life ==
Wessman was born on a communal farm in Tennessee where his parents had been living and working as part of a hippie community. Shortly after he was born, his family hitchhiked across America and settled in Oceanside, California, where Luke grew up.

== Career ==
Wessman received his first tattoo when he was sixteen-years-old from a family friend tattooing out of his house. He continued to acquire tattoos and eventually befriended a group of tattooers who had opened a shop named About Face Tattoo. It was the only shop in town because tattooing had been outlawed in San Diego County in the decades prior. Wessman began to learn a variety of tattoo styles at the shop, where the clientele included sailors, pimps, and prostitutes. One of the About Face Tattoo artists, Milford Barnes, moved to Lucky's Tattoo Parlor, a well-known shop in San Diego, CA, owned and operated by Dave Gibson, and Wessman followed him there to begin an unofficial apprenticeship. At the time, Wessman was working as an electrician. He would work as an electrician in the morning and spend his evenings apprenticing at the tattoo shop. Eventually, a spot/opportunity became available and he began tattooing full-time. At age 21, Wessman bought Lucky's Tattoo Parlor, which he owned and operated for ten years with fellow tattoo artist Shane Modica.

From 2005 to 2010, Wessman worked at Love Hate Tattoo and was featured on the TLC reality TV show Miami Ink. After the show ended, Wessman spent some time traveling and working in Scotland, Ireland, Italy, The Netherlands, and Germany. In 2010, Wessman moved to New York City to help Ami James open the Wooster Street Social Club. The shop and its crew, including Wessman, were the focus of the TLC reality TV show NY Ink. Wessman did the first tattoo at the shop. In 2014, he was a guest judge on Spike TV's Ink Master. He has written for Inked, was featured on the cover of Freshly Inked, and has been profiled in several style magazines and websites, including GQ, The Coveteur, Bound by Ink, and Style.com, among others. In 2014, Wessman designed a limited-edition postcard featuring the phrase #govote for HeadCount, a nonpartisan organization that promotes participation in democracy. The postcards were distributed at music concerts, including Jay Z and Beyoncé's “On the Run” tour.

In 2015, Wessman opened The Summertown Inn, a private tattoo studio in an undisclosed location in Orange County. It's named after the town in Tennessee where he was born, and is fashioned after a speakeasy. There's no sign out front and clients come on a referral basis.

Wessman is also a Master Freemason and has been active in Freemasonry for over 5 years.

== Tattoo Style ==
Wessman's style has been described as "Gangster Traditional," which is the merging of two distinct styles. The "gangster" style was influenced by the tattoos characteristic of the street culture he grew up around in Oceanside – Old English and block letters, Catholic imagery, black and gray coloring, etc. The "traditional" style stems from his apprenticeship at Lucky's Tattoo Parlor where tattoos closely resemble Sailor Jerry inspired style designs, which favor bold outlines, deep black shading, and images often associated with sailors, bikers and outlaw culture. Wessman avoids doing tattoos that are photo realistic or tribal. He prefers "tattoos that look like tattoos – not paintings or other styles and mediums of art." He also uses discretion when tattooing faces, hands or necks, and will only do so if the customer is a highly covered tattoo collector. He has tattooed dozens of celebrities, including Dave Navarro, CM Punk, Matt Holliday, and Silkk Tha Shocker, among others. Wessman himself has over 50 tattoos done by over 30 different artists.
