= Ink Master season 16 =

Sixteenth season of reality competition series, Ink Master

Ink Master: OGs vs Young Guns
- Season 16
- Promotional poster featuring judges and contestants
- Hosted by: Joel Madden
- Judges: Ryan Ashley; Nikko Hurtado; DJ Tambe
- No. of contestants: 16
- Winner: James Tex
- No. of episodes: 10

Release
- Original network: Paramount+
- Original release: October 23 – December 11, 2024

Season chronology
- ← Previous; Season 15 Next → Hometown Heroes

Ink Master: OGs vs Young Guns is the sixteenth season of tattoo reality competition show, Ink Master which was announced on October 2, 2024. It premiered on October 23, 2024, with the first three episodes premiering on Paramount+ and the following episodes being released weekly. Good Charlotte vocalist Joel Madden returns as host, while season 8 winner Ryan Ashley and Nikko Hurtado return as judges for their third season and three-time champion, DJ Tambe, returning for his second.

Like the previous season, artists competed against each other for the title of Ink Master as well as a $250,000 cash prize. The season contained 16 new artists competing, which were unveiled before the season premiere. The season saw artists who had been in the industry for more than a decade and a group of newer artists who had only been tattooing for a few years.

James Tex was crowned the winner of the season, with his son, Anthony Tex, being the runner-up.

== Judging and ranking ==
=== Judging panel ===
The judging panel is a table of four primary judges. The judges make their final decision by voting to see who had best tattoo of the day, and who goes home.

=== Jury of Peers ===
Whoever wins Best Tattoo of the Day, their team will be able to put one artist up for elimination, regardless what team they are on.

During the finale, six eliminated contestants returned to form a jury and voted one artist to the top two.

== Contestants ==
The two episodes featured 16 artists competing to be one of the 12 artists that were split into two teams of 6. Two OGs and two Young Guns were eliminated if they do not earn a spot on a team.

Names, experience, and cities stated are at time of filming.

Contestant Name	Years of experience	Hometown	Outcome
James Tex	26	Calgary, Canada	Winner
Anthony Tex	13	Calgary, Canada	Runner-up
Cat Castro	8	Riverside, California	3rd place
Stephanie Heffron	14	Tucson, Arizona	4th place
Pony Lawson	22	Chicago, Illinois	5th place
Jade Olivia	3	Everett, Massachusetts	6th place
Lucy Hu	20	Alhambra, California	7th place
Trevor Burtz	9	San Clemente, California	8th place
Joseph Serrano	4	Puerto Rico	9th place
Jorell Elie	15	Atlanta, Georgia	10th place
Jenna Coffin	5	Edmonton, Canada	11th place (Note: Coffin quit the competition.)
Alena Wedderburn	10	New York City, New York	12th place
Andy Pho	13	Hutto, Texas	13th place
Manny Fernandez	13	Las Vegas, Nevada	14th place
Johnny Angel	4	Sacramento, California	15th place
Love Duncan	6	Alexandria, Virginia	16th place

=== Chosen ===
OGs
James Tex
Anthony Tex
Stephanie Heffron
Lucy Hu
Pony Lawson
Jorell Elie

Young Guns
Alena Wedderburn
Joseph Serrano
Jade Olivia
Jenna Coffin
Cat Castro
Trevor Burtz

=== Not chosen ===
Contestant Name
Love Duncan
Johnny Angel
Manny Fernandez
Andy Pho

== Contestant progress ==
Indicates the contestant was a Young Gun.
Indicates the contestant was an OG.

Contestant	Episode									
Contestant	1 (Note: The OGs were exempt from elimination.) (Note: Love was ranked the lowest and was eliminated immediately. Cat and Trevor defeated Johnny in the Face-Off to determine who would stay in the competition.)	2 (Note: The Young Guns were exempt from elimination.) (Note: Pony and Jorell won their Head-to-Heads against Manny and Andy to determine who would stay in the competition.)	3	4 (Note: Jenna would have been put in the bottom by the judges, but quit before they could decide on who would be eliminated.)	5	6 (Note: Lucy and James were ranked the lowest in the elimination tattoo and chose Joseph and Trevor respectively in the Face Off Tattoo.)	7	8	9	10
James Tex	SAFE	WIN	LOW	WIN	WIN	BTM4	TOP3	TOP2	ADV	Winner
Anthony Tex	SAFE	TOP4	LOW	HIGH	SAFE	HIGH	WIN	BTM3	ADV	Runner-up
Cat Castro	BTM4	SAFE	HIGH	TOP3	TOP2	WIN	TOP3	BTM3	ADV	Eliminated
Stephanie Heffron	SAFE	TOP4	TOP2	LOW	SAFE	SAFE	BTM3	WIN	ELIM	Guest
Pony Lawson	SAFE	WIN	WIN	TOP3	HIGH	HIGH	SAFE	HIGH	ELIM	Guest
Jade Olivia	TOP4	SAFE	BTM3	SAFE	SAFE	HIGH	BTM3	ELIM		Guest
Lucy Hu	SAFE	TOP4	SAFE	LOW	SAFE	BTM4	ELIM			Guest
Trevor Burtz	BTM4	SAFE	SAFE	BTM3	BTM3	ELIM				Guest
Joseph Serrano	TOP4	SAFE	LOW	BTM3	BTM3	ELIM				Guest
Jorell Elie	SAFE	WIN	BTM3	SAFE	ELIM					
Jenna Coffin	TOP4	SAFE	LOW	QUIT						
Alena Wedderburn	WIN	SAFE	ELIM							
Andy Pho	SAFE	ELIM								
Manny Fernandez	SAFE	ELIM								
Johnny Angel	ELIM									
Love Duncan	ELIM									

The contestant won Ink Master.
The contestant was the runner-up.
The contestant was eliminated during the finale.
The contestant advanced to the finale.
The contestant won Best Tattoo of the Day.
The contestant won their Head-to-Head challenge.
The contestant was ranked at the top by the judges during the Blind Critique.
The contestant was among the top.
The contestant received positive critiques.
The contestant received negative critiques.
The contestant was in the bottom.
The contestant was put in the bottom by the Jury of Peers.
The contestant was eliminated from the competition.
The contestant quit the competition.
The contestant returned as a guest in the episode.

== Episodes ==
No. overall	No. in season	Title	Original release date
207	1	"Divide of the Decade"	October 23, 2024
Elimination Tattoo: Sixteen new artists form two teams: the OGs, who have more than ten years of experience, and the Young Guns, who have barely just begun their tattoo career. They must compete with their teams until the very end. Before they battle it out against each other, they must compete to get on one of the six spots on each team. Four artists will be eliminated without getting a spot. The Young Guns compete first. The subject matter is up to them, but the style is not. They must do either American traditional, Japanese or New School. The tattoos will be judged blind. They have 5 hours to tattoo. One by one, the top four artists are revealed and are safe from elimination. The bottom ranked artist is eliminated. The last three artists have one more shot to get a spot on the team.; Top Four: Alena Wedderburn, Joseph Serrano, Jade Olivia, and Jenna Coffin; Eliminated: Love Duncan; Face-Off Tattoo: The remaining Young Guns' fate lies within their potential teammates' hands. They decided on a neo-traditional face for them to earn a spot on the team.; Eliminated: Johnny Angel
208	2	"Money Where Your Mouth Is"	October 23, 2024
Elimination Tattoo: It is the OGs' turn to feel the heat, as they compete to snag one of the 6 spots on the team. The OGs must tattoo the same style and subject as one of the four highest ranked Young Guns from the first episode. Their tattoos will be directly compared to the Young Guns.; Top Four: James Tex, Anthony Tex, Stephanie Heffron, and Lucy Hu; Bottom: Andy Pho, Manny Fernandez, Jorell Elie, and Pony Lawson; Head-to-Head Tattoo: The lowest ranked artists must compete against each other to get the last two spots on the OG team. They must face off against another artist in a Head to Head. The higher ranked artist will be matched against the lowest ranked. The lower-ranked artist of the two will choose the style and subject of their tattoo. The lowest-ranked artist was Andy, and he competed against the 5th ranked artist, Jorell. Andy chose a black-and-grey realistic animal. Pony and Manny faced off; as the lower-ranked artist, Pony chose a black-and-grey realistic hand.; Eliminated: Manny Fernandez and Andy Pho
209	3	"Out of the Box, Onto the Skin"	October 23, 2024
Skill of the Week: Creativity; Flash Challenge: The teams must create a life-sized statue using cardboard to test their creativity in six hours. The winning team have the power to assign the human canvases during the Elimination Tattoo. The Young Guns have trouble finding unity as a team, as everyone has ideas they want to input and Jenna is bumping heads with her teammates.; Winner: Young Guns; Elimination Tattoo: To push their creativity, they must tattoo lettering tattoos. The winning tattoo's team will be able to put one artist up for elimination as a Jury of Peers. The judges were not impressed with the Jury's pick, immediately disregarding their choice and their plan backfired.; Best Tattoo of the Day: Pony Lawson; Jury of Peers' Pick: Jade Olivia; Bottom: Alena Wedderburn and Jorell Elie; Eliminated: Alena Wedderburn
210	4	"Inked in Gold"	October 30, 2024
Skill of the Week: Ingenuity; Flash Challenge: To test their ingenuity, the teams use recyclable objects to make massive work of art on a 8-by-12 foot canvas. The Young Guns struggle with time now that they are down a teammate.; Winner: OGs; Elimination Tattoo: Artists have to tattoo metallic tattoos. Jenna questions whether or not she can handle the pressure of the competition. Although the judges agreed Jenna was in the Bottom Three, she ultimately decided to quit the competition, saving Trevor and Joseph from elimination.; Best Tattoo of the Day: James Tex; Jury of Peers' Pick: Trevor Burtz; Bottom: Joseph Serrano and Jenna Coffin; Quit: Jenna Coffin
211	5	"A Sin in Tattooing"	November 6, 2024
Skill of the Week: Composition; Flash Challenge: Artists must test composition using grass as their canvas.; Winner: OGs; Elimination Tattoo: Artists must tattoo a Japanese Samurai.; Best Tattoo of the Day: James Tex; Jury of Peers' Pick: Trevor Burtz; Bottom: Joseph Serrano and Jorell Elie; Eliminated: Jorell Elie
212	6	"At Your Service"	November 13, 2024
There is no Flash Challenge this episode.: Skill of the Week: Precision; Elimination Tattoo: To test precision, artists must tattoo portraits of service dogs. The tattoos will be judged blind. The picking order is randomly assigned. The episode is a double elimination.; Best Tattoo of the Day: Cat Castro; Bottom: Lucy Hu and James Tex; Face-Off Tattoo: Lucy and James must face off two different artists, tattooing the same subject and style. They can pick any artist except Cat. The artist they choose get to choose the style and subject. Lucy chose Joseph, and he chose black and grey realistic panda with graffiti. James chose Trevor and he chose black and grey realistic skull and rose.; Eliminated: Joseph Serrano and Trevor Burtz
213	7	"Monsters Ink"	November 20, 2024
Skill of the Week: Contrast; Flash Challenge: Teams must create masterpieces on a concrete wall using tools. Since there are only two Young Guns, they get to choose one member from the OGs to join them, and they chose James.; Winner: Young Guns and James Tex; Elimination Tattoo: Artists must tattoo New School monsters.; Best Tattoo of the Day: Anthony Tex; Jury of Peers' Pick: Jade Olivia; Bottom: Lucy Hu and Stephanie Heffron; Eliminated: Lucy Hu
212	8	"Face Your Fears"	November 27, 2024
Skill of the Week: Adaptability; Flash Challenge: For the last flash challenge of the season, artists must make two works of art on a single pane of glass. Artists have to paint both sides with two different designs and they must share the same negative space. They must compete in teams of two.; Winner: Young Guns; Elimination Tattoo: Artists must do a face tattoo. It must flow seamlessly from the side of the head and down to the cheek.; Best Tattoo of the Day: Stephanie Herron; Jury of Peers' Pick: Cat Castro; Bottom: Jade Olivia and Anthony Tex; Eliminated: Jade Olivia
213	9	"Mash Up Mayhem"	December 4, 2024
Skill of the Week: Versatility; Elimination Tattoo #1: To earn a spot in the finale, artists must create a mashup tattoo. The artists must pick two skulls from two different groups of five. The judges will score these tattoos blind. Stephanie got American traditional geometric, Anthony got Neo traditional fine line black-and-grey, James has Biomechanical watercolor, Pony got New school surrealism, and Cat got Japanese realism.; Elimination Tattoo #2: The artists must do a second mashup tattoo in the same style and subject another artist did.; Advanced: James Tex, Anthony Tex, and Cat Castro; Eliminated: Pony Lawson and Stephanie Heffron; Finale Tattoo: The finalists must tattoo a 24 hour back piece tattoo. The style and subject is up to the artists. In a final twist, the artists must do a second master canvas in a 12 hour leg piece. The opposing team gets to choose the style and subject for their opponents. Cat chose black-and-grey photorealistic lion for both Anthony and James, and they chose an American traditional lion for her.
214	10	"OGs vs Young Gun"	December 11, 2024
The finalists unveil their 2 Master Canvases over the course of three days. A spot in the top two is in the hands of a Jury of Peers. Stephanie, Pony and Lucy from the OGs and Jade, Joseph and Trevor from the Young Guns are brought in. The finalists' families sent in videos for them.: Jury of Peers' Pick: James Tex; Third Place: Cat Castro; Runner-Up: Anthony Tex; Winner: James Tex

== No More Ink ==
For the season's after show, No More Ink, contestants from previous seasons, veteran artists, and various celebrities are interviewed about their careers and opinions on the episode's tattoos by the contestants. The show is hosted by judge Ryan Ashley. A segment called "Ink Remastered" is introduced, which gives a past contestant redemption on a tattoo they were sent home on.

- Episode 1: Nikko Hurtado (aired: October 23, 2024)
- Episode 2: Nikki Simpson (aired: October 23, 2024)
- Episode 3: Loosey LaDuca (aired: October 24, 2024)
- Episode 4: Megan Massacre (aired: October 30, 2024)
- Episode 5: Darren Brand (aired: November 6, 2024)
- Episode 6: Mandii B (aired: November 13, 2024)
- Episode 7: Natalie Cuomo (aired: November 20, 2024)
- Episode 8: Andrea Richter (aired: November 27, 2024)
- Episode 9: Maino (aired: December 4, 2024)
- Episode 10: Bang Bang (aired: December 11, 2024)
