= Darren Brass =

American tattoo artist (born 1972)

- Born: Darren Collarado Brass; January 22, 1972 (age 54); Waterbury, Connecticut, U.S.
- Occupations: Tattoo artist Television personality

Darren Brass is an American tattoo artist and television personality. He was featured in the reality television show Miami Ink.

== Information ==
Darren Brass cites Chris Garver, Joe Vegas, Bob Roberts, and Ed Hardy as influences. In the year of 2010, Brass co-founded a children's clothing and product label called Ruthless & Toothless. Darren Brass has been in the tattoo business for about 25 years now. Brass moved from Waterbury, Connecticut to Miami so that he could possibly further his career as a tattoo artist. Brass uses his role in Miami Ink in the LoveHate Parlour to showcase his artwork and hopefully gain clientele. While working in the Miami Ink shop, he is often messed with by costar Ami James because he has a nice attitude.

== Background ==
Darren Brass's whole name is Darren Collarado Brass. He was born in 1972, and began his career when one of his friends introduced him to tattooing. Brass has diabetes and has to take due precaution while working. He is 5 foot 4 inches and is covered in bright and colorful tattoos. He is married and has a little dog that he is known to treat like his child. Brass received his first tattoo when he turned 18 years old.
