= Original Media =

American production company, founded 2002

- Type: Subsidiary
- Industry: Entertainment industry
- Founded: 2002; 24 years ago
- Founders: Charlie Corwin; Clara Markowicz
- Defunct: 2017; 9 years ago
- Fate: Merged with True Entertainment to form Truly Original
- Successor: Truly Original
- Headquarters: New York City, New York, U.S.
- Products: Film production; Television production
- Parent: Endemol USA (2007–2015); Endemol Shine North America (2015–2017)

Original Media was an American production company founded in 2002 by Charlie Corwin and Clara Markowicz. The company produced feature films, reality television, scripted television, and digital programming. In 2017, it was merged with True Entertainment to form Truly Original, a subsidiary of Endemol Shine North America.

== History ==
The company was founded in 2002 and some of Original Media's television series include the TLC series Miami Ink and its spinoffs LA Ink and NY Ink, the Bravo series The Rachel Zoe Project, Oprah Winfrey Network's The Gayle King Show, Discovery Channel's Storm Chasers and Dual Survival, TLC and Destination America's BBQ Pitmasters, History's Swamp People, DIY Network's King of Dirt, Logo TV's Be Good Johnny Weir and NBC's The Philanthropist.

By 2007, the company, headquartered in New York City, was a subsidiary of Endemol USA, a leading producer of television programming specializing in reality and non-scripted genres for network and cable television.

In 2017, Original Media and sister company True Entertainment merged to form Truly Original.
