= Bondi Ink Tattoo =

Australian television series

- Also known as: Bondi Ink Tattoo Crew
- Genre: Reality
- Created by: Unbreakable International
- Starring: Megan Massacre
- Opening theme: "Success Is the Best Revenge" by Dallas Frasca
- Country of origin: Australia
- Original language: English
- No. of seasons: 2
- No. of episodes: 20

Production
- Executive producers: Johnny Hyldmar; Josh Polistico; Mark Spillane; Kristie Lawrence
- Producers: Troy Annett; Brandon Friesen
- Production locations: Bondi Beach, New South Wales, Australia
- Production company: Unbreakable International

Original release
- Network: Eleven
- Release: 28 July 2015 – 20 April 2017

Bondi Ink Tattoo, also known as Bondi Ink Tattoo Crew, is an Australian factual television series on Eleven which follows events which take place in a tattoo shop on Bondi Beach. The show premiered on Australia's Network Ten on 28 July 2015.

== Cast ==
- Shaun Bones (season 1–2)
- Megan Massacre (season 1–2)
- Jimi May (season 1–2)
- Teneile Napoli (season 1-2)
- John Tadrosse (season 1–2)
- Ellie Thompson (season 1–2)
- Mike Diamond (Season 1)
- Giorgia Mae (season 1)
- Moses Savea (season 1)
- Wendy Tadrosse (season 1)
- Jesska Cristalball (season 2)
- Van Peters (season 2)

=== Guest artist appearances ===
- Rhys Gordon (season 1)
- Bennett Neil (season 1)
- Karlee Sabrina (season 2)
- Lauren Winzer (season 2)

== Episodes ==
Season	Episodes	Season premiere	Season finale
1	10	28 July 2015	29 September 2015
2	10	16 February 2017	20 April 2017

== Broadcast ==
Bondi Ink Tattoo Crew has enjoyed considerable success outside Australia and has been sold and broadcast in Africa (SonyMax), Ireland (TV3), UK (TruTV), UK Scuzz, New Zealand (TVNZ), USA (Fuse) and Latin America (TruTV).

Bondi Ink Tattoo Crew is broadcast in Australia on ELEVEN, one of Network Ten's two digital channels.

== See also ==
- List of tattoo TV shows
- List of Australian television series
