= Snoop Dogg's Father Hood =

- Opening title
- Genre: Reality
- Starring: Snoop Dogg
- Country of origin: United States
- No. of seasons: 2
- No. of episodes: 18

Production
- Executive producers: Calvin "Snoop Dogg" Broadus, Jr. David Roma; Constance Schwartz; Ted Chung
- Running time: 30 minutes
- Production companies: Snoopadelic Films; The Firm

Original release
- Network: E!
- Release: December 9, 2007 – January 25, 2009

Snoop Dogg's Father Hood is an American reality television series, executive produced and directed by David Roma, as well as Ted Chung, Constance Schwartz and Anthony Mandler. The series debuted on December 9, 2007 in the United States on E!, with the second and final season premiering on November 30, 2008.

== Premise ==
The series follows the daily life of rapper Snoop Dogg and his family. His family includes his wife Shante, daughter Cori whom he calls "Choc", son Cordell whom he calls "Rook", and his oldest son Corde whom he calls "Spank".

== Episodes ==
=== Series overview ===
Season	Episodes	Originally released	
Season	Episodes	First released	Last released
1	10	December 9, 2007	March 2, 2008
2	8	November 30, 2008	January 25, 2009

=== Season 1 (2007–2008) ===
No.	Title	Original release date
1	"Downward Dogg"	December 9, 2007
Snoop attempts to use the technique yoga, while the children and godson are left to clean the house.
2	"Snoop It Like Beckham"	December 16, 2007
Snoop tries to introduce soccer to the kids. Meanwhile, Shante tries to deal with Snoop's diet. David Beckham guest stars.
3	"New York Ain't Always Like it Seems"	December 23, 2007
Snoop, Shante and Cori go to New York City for the Hip Hop Honors, while Anthony babysits the boys back at home.
4	"The Doggs and the Bees"	December 30, 2007
Snoop shoots the music video for "Sexual Eruption" while teaching Corde about sex.
5	"For Schnitzle"	January 6, 2008
The family goes to Munich, Germany for Shante's birthday. Snoop prepares to host the 2007 MTV Europe Music Awards.
6	"The Dogg Whisperer"	January 13, 2008
Snoop and Shante can not control their dogs so they call in a dog trainer. Anthony airs on the radio.
7	"Snow in tha Hood"	January 20, 2008
Snoop teaches his kids about ice hockey. Willie O'Ree and Keyshia Cole were guest stars.
8	"Long Way from Long Beach"	February 10, 2008
Snoop takes his kids to Long Beach to teach them a lesson. Cori teaches Anthony the secret skill of Guitar Hero.
9	"Who'z tha Boss"	February 17, 2008
The Boss Dogg and The Boss Lady each explore their business ventures.
10	"Vows"	March 2, 2008
Snoop Dogg and Shante renew their vows.

=== Season 2 (2008–2009) ===
No.	Title	Original release date
1	"Quarter Back Camp"	November 30, 2008
2	"Snoop the Sitter"	December 7, 2008
3	"Dogg Fight"	December 14, 2008
4	"Snoop's New Dogg House"	December 21, 2008
5	"Snoop's Got Heart"	December 28, 2008
6	"Lil' Snoop"	January 4, 2009
7	"Snoop on the Move"	January 18, 2009
8	"Back to School"	January 25, 2009
