= Mark Zupan (athlete) =

American wheelchair rugby player

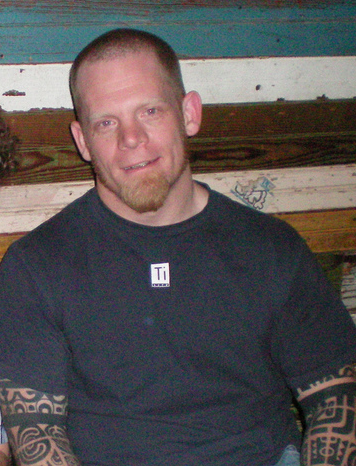
- Zupan at the SXSW 20X2, March 16, 2009
- Born: 20 May 1975 (age 51); Cleveland, Ohio, U.S.

Mark Zupan (born May 20, 1975) is a wheelchair rugby player and the captain of the United States wheelchair rugby team which competed in the Paralympic Games in 2004. He is best known for his appearance in the 2005 film Murderball. Zupan was also a part of the 2008 United States gold winning team at the 2008 Beijing Paralympic Games.

== Early life ==
Zupan was born in Cleveland, Ohio, to Thomas and Linda Zupan. He played varsity football and soccer at Marjory Stoneman Douglas High School in Parkland, FL, earning him a scholarship to Florida Atlantic University.

== Paralyzing accident ==
After a soccer game on October 14, 1993, Zupan got drunk with teammates at a bar and then crawled into the back of friend Chris Igoe's truck to sleep. Some time later Igoe left the bar unaware that Zupan was asleep in the back. Driving drunk, Igoe spun out and Zupan was thrown from the pickup bed, over a fence, and into a canal, where he held onto a branch for 14 hours until being discovered by a passerby. He went into hypothermia and became paralyzed as a result of the accident. Zupan has incomplete quadriplegia and is able to walk for short distances with crutches.

== Wheelchair rugby career ==
After his accident, Zupan graduated from Georgia Tech, became a two-time quad rugby national champion, the 2004 quad rugby player of the year. He was a member of the bronze medal-winning U.S. team at the 2004 Summer Paralympics, and the gold medal-winning team at the 2008 Games. He is a resident of Austin, Texas.

When asked if he would "turn back the clock on that day", Zupan answered "No, I don't think so. My injury has led me to opportunities and experiences and friendships I would never have had before. And it has taught me about myself. In some ways, it's the best thing that ever happened to me."

== Media personality ==
Zupan was featured as a customer in TLC's Miami Ink during the first season. Parts of his documentary were shown as background information.

He was depicted in an episode of the claymation series Celebrity Deathmatch in a match against Chris Pontius; he won.

In August 2007, Zupan's team "Superman's Crip-Tonite" placed second in Red Bull Flugtag event in Austin, Texas. For their efforts they won a $3,000 prize. Zupan's Flugtag adventure was chronicled in an ESPN.com story by writer Mary Buckheit.

He was also in the movie Jackass Number Two, in a skit called "Lake Jump", where his wheelchair was rigged up with carbon dioxide tanks and pushed off a ramp by Chris Pontius. Before taking off, the tanks triggered, launching him off of the ramp and into the lake.

Zupan was featured in a 2008 episode of 30 Days in which former NFL athlete Ray Crockett used a wheelchair for 30 days and at one point attempted to play wheelchair rugby.

In the second season of the television show Friday Night Lights, Zupan appeared briefly in the episode "Bad Ideas" as Steve, a friend who accompanies character Jason Street to a doctor appointment.

In the first season of Nitro Circus, he made a brief appearance in episode 11. He was seen being taped to a sled and rode down a hill before crashing.

Zupan was a commentator for NBC during the Tokyo Paralympics.

== Bibliography ==
- Zupan's autobiography GIMP : When Life Deals You a Crappy Hand, You Can Fold—or You Can Play (ISBN 0-06-112768-X) was published by HarperCollins on October 17, 2006.

== Filmography ==
=== Television ===
- Live with Regis and Kelly (1 episode, 2005)
- The Tonight Show with Jay Leno (1 episode, 2005)
- The Late Late Show with Craig Ferguson (1 episode, 2005)
- Larry King Live (1 episode, 2005)
- Miami Ink (1 episode, 2005)
- Friday Night Lights (1 episode, 2007)
- 30 Days (1 episode, 2008)
- Nitro Circus (2 episodes, 2009)
- 50 Documentaries to See Before You Die (1 episode, 2011)

=== Films ===
- Murderball (2005)
- Jackass Number Two (2006)
- Jackass 3D (2010)
- Jackass 3.5 (2011)
