= Nikole Lowe =

New Zealand tattoo artist

- Born: 31 October 1973 (age 51); New Zealand
- Occupations: Tattoo artist; television personality

Nikole Lowe (born 31 October 1973) is a British tattoo artist. She is best known for her appearances on the tattoo reality television show London Ink.

== Biography ==
Nikole Lowe is originally from New Zealand. She first began tattooing in 1991 at Dermagraphic Tattoo Studio in Auckland's Ponsonby area, New Zealand. She had always planned on being a singer, not a tattoo artist. She opened up her own shop called Good Times Tattoo in London, United Kingdom.

She has tattooed Adam Ant, Daniel Johns of Silverchair, and Boy George.
