= King of Clubs (TV series) =

American reality TV series

- Country of origin: United States

Production
- Running time: 30 mins

Original release
- Network: Playboy TV
- Release: 2009

King of Clubs was an adult reality series aired on Playboy TV that ended in May 2009. It revolved around the Gentile family and their operation of Las Vegas' historic Palomino Strip Club.

== Premise ==
The show premise is based upon the real business operations of Nevada attorney Dominic Gentile. In 2006, he purchased the Palomino Club to cover legal fees from former owner Luis Hidalgo III. Since the acquisition, Gentile's son Adam has overseen daily operations and his ex-wife, Michelle, has managed the accounting.

Originally featured on Gene Simmons Family Jewels, producers felt the story and club staff would make for a compelling reality series on its own. Though much too risque for A&E, the show was pitched to and picked up by Playboy TV in late 2008. Premiering in September 2009, King of Clubs will carry a humorous tone and be primarily focused on Adam Gentile's continuous struggle to manage his best friend bartender, out-of-control bouncers, and unpredictable staff of exotic dancers. The show is produced by The Greif Company, executive produced and directed by David Roma, and created and executive produced by Leslie Greif and Adam Reed. According to her Twitter account, former child actress and member of the original cast of the children's sketch show All That, Katrina Johnson has appeared on a few episodes. Johnson is a bartender at the club featured in the show.

== Episode Guide ==
Season 1

Episode Number	Episode Name	Date of Production
101	Risky Business	3/4/2009
102	The Bachelor Party	3/9/2009
103	Designa Vagina	3/14/2009
104	Wide Open for Business	3/17/2009
105	A Naked Wedding?	3/24/2009
106	Strip Olympics	3/26/2009
107	Got MILF?	3/30/2009
108	Cowgirls Gone Wild	4/28/2009
109	Double D Feature	5/2/2009
110	Ladies Night	5/4/2009
111	Fresh Meat	5/12/2009
112	Rear Ended	5/28/2009
