= London Ink =

English tattoo reality show

- Directed by: Bob Marsden; Cristin Cricco-Powell; Rob Lambie
- Starring: Louis Molloy; Dan Gold; Nikole Lowe; Phil Kyle
- Narrated by: Max Beesley
- Country of origin: United Kingdom
- Original language: English
- No. of seasons: 2
- No. of episodes: 12

Production
- Executive producers: Fenton Bailey; Randy Barbato
- Producer: Margaret Meenaghan
- Running time: 60 minutes
- Production company: World of Wonder

Original release
- Network: Discovery Real Time
- Release: 23 September 2007 – 23 November 2008

Related
- Miami Ink; LA Ink; NY Ink; Madrid Ink

London Ink is a British reality television show on Discovery Real Time that follows the tattoo artists Louis Molloy, Nikole Lowe, Dan Gold, and Phil Kyle.

== Premise ==
Each of the artists brings a different style to London Ink. Louis Molloy, is an expert in parallel and straight lines and other difficult shapes, and has tattooed David Beckham. Dan Gold is an avid graffiti artist in the freehand new wave graffiti style. New Zealand artist Nikole Lowe specializes in Japanese, Tibetan, and Indian-themed art. American Phil Kyle brings a new wave old school style with his own twist over to England. The show is a spin-off of Miami Ink and premiered on 23 September 2007.

The first series was filmed at London Tattoo in Islington, London. The shop lives on as a day to day tattoo studio London Tattoo at the Islington location.

== Cast ==
Main members

- Louis Molloy
- Nikole Lowe
- Dan Gold
- Phil Kyle

Celebrity customers

- Samantha Fox
- Michael Graham
- Ronan Keating
- Alex Kramer
- Shane Lynch
- Jodie Marsh
- Emily Scott
- Iwan Thomas
- Darren Thompson

== Episodes ==
- Season 1 - 6 episodes
- Season 2 - 6 episodes

== See also ==
- List of tattoo TV shows
