= Louis Molloy =

English tattoo artist

- Born: 1963 (age 62–63); United Kingdom
- Occupations: Tattoo artist; television personality

Louis Molloy (born 1963) is a British tattoo artist. He is best known for designing David Beckham's tattoo. He also appeared on the tattoo reality television show London Ink.

== Biography ==
Louis Molloy first began tattooing in the 1970s despite the fact that at the time no apprenticeships were available to him due to the seedy sub-culture that tattooing was viewed as. Molloy spent most of his later teenage years honing his skills, and was only 18 when he opened his first, Manchester-based tattoo shop, which in the next decade would become a world class establishment.

He designed David Beckham's back tattoo, depicting a bald, winged, angelic figure. Beckham calls the tattoo his "guardian angel" and premiered it in 1999 after work finished in April that year.

He has since completed tattoos on other celebrities, including Spice Girls Melanie C, Mel B, and Victoria Beckham, all members of Boyzone, and fellow Mancunian Ricky Hatton.

He has been recognised twice with UK Outstanding Artist of the Year awards.

In 2007, he became a part of the Discovery Channel's television team with the programme London Ink. The show follows the daily happenings at the new shop, in the first series the main focus was on the relationship between Dan Gold and Molloy.
