= NY Ink =

- Genre: Documentary
- Starring: Ami James
- Opening theme: "New York Groove" by Ace Frehley (seasons 1–2) "East Coast Ink" by Jon Spurney (season 3)
- Country of origin: United States
- Original language: English
- No. of seasons: 3
- No. of episodes: 23

Production
- Camera setup: Multi-camera
- Running time: 44 minutes (excluding commercials)
- Production company: Original Media

Original release
- Network: TLC
- Release: June 2, 2011 – May 2, 2013

Related
- Miami Ink; London Ink; LA Ink

NY Ink is an American reality documentary television series that debuted June 2, 2011 on TLC. TLC renewed the series for a second season in August 2011, also noting that the series' first season averaged 1.3 million viewers per episode. Filming for the third season started in August 2012 with the season premiering on April 4, 2013.

== Premise ==
After Miami Ink (2004–2008) ended, tattoo artist Ami James moved to New York City in 2011 to fulfill his dream of opening a new tattoo studio, which he named the Wooster St. Social Club (now called Five Points Tattoo, located on 127 Lafayette Street. Open everyday from 12pm to 8pm). James was joined again by producers David Roma and Charlie Corwin to detail the proceedings in the shop on NY Ink.

== Opening ==
The series intro is narrated by James:

I'm Ami James and I'm a tattoo artist. New York is the greatest city in the world. And to compete here, you have to elevate the game. So I've hand-picked the finest tattoo artists around. Because I don't want the best tattoo shop in New York, I want the best shop in the world. There's millions of stories in New York City, and our job is to tell them all... in ink.

== Cast ==
Jessica Gahring and Tommy Montoya (standing); Robear, Chris Torres, Tim Hendricks, Megan Massacre and Billy DeCola (seated, from left)

=== Main cast ===
- Ami James - owner/artist
- Tim Hendricks - artist (seasons 1-2)
- Tommy Montoya - artist
- Megan Massacre - artist
- Chris Torres - artist (season 1-2)
- Billy DeCola - apprentice/artist (season 1-2)
- Robear† - floor manager (season 1-2)
- Jessica Gahring - shop manager (season 1-2)
- Rodrigo Canteras - artist (season 3)
- Mike Diamond - shop manager (season 3)
- Yoji Harada† - artist (season 3, guest during season 2)
- Lee Rodriguez - artist (season 3, recurring season 2)
- Jes Leppard - front desk (season 3)

=== Minor cast ===
- Luke - artist (season 2)
- Eddie - artist (season 2)
- Nice Guy - artist (season 2)

=== Current ===
- Ami James — shop owner and famed tattoo artist from Miami Ink
- Rodrigo Canteras
- Morgwn Pennypacker
- Paulo Benevides
- Chris Garver
- Guy Waisman

=== Celebrity appearances ===
- Corey Taylor, lead vocalist of Slipknot and Stone Sour
- Method Man, actor and rapper of the Wu-Tang Clan
- Dawn Harlot Dupre, guitarist and vocalist of Bambi Killers
- Djinji Brown, lead vocalist of Absolution
- LaMarr Woodley, linebacker for the Pittsburgh Steelers
- Robert Vaughn, fashion designer for Von Dutch
- Angelina Pivarnick, former Jersey Shore cast member
- Jenna Morasca, Survivor: The Amazon winner
- Ethan Zohn, Survivor: Africa winner
- Alan Robert, bass guitarist/backing vocals of Life of Agony and comic book writer/artist
- Beth Shak, professional poker player
- James Durbin, American Idol season 10 finalist
- Tila Tequilla, reality star, model and singer
- Marky Ramone, former drummer of The Ramones
- John Forté, musician, Grammy nominated producer for The Fugees and activist
- Mauro Castano, Carlo's Bake Shop pastry chef and Bartolo "Buddy" Valastro's right-hand man on Cake Boss
- Bai Ling, actress
- Joe Letz, drummer of Combichrist
- Chris Motionless, lead vocalist of Motionless in White
- Tami Ferraiuolo, cast member of 60 Days In Season 1
- Shadia and Bilal Amen, members of the Amen family from All-American Muslim
- Sadat X, rapper from Brand Nubian
- Frank Iero, rhythm guitarist of My Chemical Romance, Pencey Prep and the lead vocalist of Leathermouth

== Episodes ==
=== Series overview ===
Season	Episodes	Originally released	
Season	Episodes	First released	Last released
1	8	June 2, 2011	July 21, 2011
2	10	December 29, 2011	March 1, 2012
3	5	April 4, 2013	May 2, 2013

=== Season 1 (2011) ===
No. overall	No. in season	Title	Original release date	U.S. viewers (millions)
1	1	"Back in a New York Groove"	June 2, 2011	1.37
In the first episode, former Miami Ink tattoo artist Ami James returns to New York to fulfill his dream of opening his own tattoo shop in New York City along with some of the best tattoo artists he knows joining his team.
2	2	"The Gloves Are Off"	June 9, 2011	1.30
With the shop's rough opening week, Chris is causing problems with the shop managers and tattoo artists making Ami decide whether to fire his first employee already.
3	3	"Dis-Appointment"	June 16, 2011	1.44
Megan's partying the night before is affecting her work, making her miss a scheduled client. Tim's easy-going attitude is interfering with the business when he does not make appointments.
4	4	"Blood is Thicker Than Ink"	June 23, 2011	1.30
Ami's' apprentice and best friend, Billy, is reaching breaking point at the shop especially when Ami asks his brother Shai about becoming an apprentice as well. When Megan finds out her boyfriend cheated on her with her best friend, Chris seizes an opportunity for romance.
5	5	"Out of the Box"	June 30, 2011	1.28
When Ami realizes his shop is not doing as well as he had hoped, shop manager Jessica tries to help by confronting him about his financial situation, but ends up doing more harm than good.
6	6	"Think Again"	July 7, 2011	1.19
After skipping out on her duties to work a magazine photo shoot, Jessica talks about sex position at the shop and Ami has to have a talk with her. Floor manager Robear gets fed up with Tommy's relentless pranks.
7	7	"Roosters and Romance"	July 14, 2011	1.45
Ami's' business stalls and seems to be on the brink. Meanwhile, Chris's attitude goes cold, but his relationship with Megan heats up.
8	8	"Last Man Standing"	July 21, 2011	1.38
Ami's reaches his breaking point with Chris. Megan finds herself caught in the middle and the future of the crew is in limbo. The youngest female winner of Survivor, Jenna Morasca, comes into the shop.

=== Season 2 (2011–2012) ===
No. overall	No. in season	Title	Original release date	U.S. viewers (millions)
9	1	"Kings of NY"	December 29, 2011	1.48
Ami's struggles have paid off and the Wooster Street Social Club is the hottest tattoo shop in NYC. But, more success means more problems. Ami needs to keep it all together and tries to find the time to balance work and family life.
10	2	"Big Money, Big Dreams"	January 5, 2012	1.01
Ami hosts an event to celebrate the success of the shop but Megan chooses to invite Chris, which displeases Ami. Jessica takes risks that can jeopardize the business.
11	3	"Paying Dues"	January 12, 2012	1.13
Risque photos of Megan spread around the office, causing a stir among employees. Ami has been allowing Billy to do a small tattoo for a short time and now it is his chance to work on a more elaborate one. Tila Tequila wants a tattoo to memorialize her parents.
12	4	"Love and Hate"	January 19, 2012	1.26
After a hectic few weeks, Ami heads to South Beach to spend some much-needed time with his daughter and hangs with the gang from Love/Hate. The crew back at Wooster Street goofs around while Ami is on vacation.
13	5	"Give and Take"	January 26, 2012	1.19
Deciding to give back to the community, Ami invites a group of teenagers to the shop for some fun after being inspired by a touching tattoo. But when ribbing from the crew drives Robear to the edge and his wrath, a damper sets in on the party.
14	6	"Boiling Point"	February 2, 2012	0.95
Tensions finally give way as Billy storms out of Wooster Street after Ami confronts him. Hoping to have some fun, the girls at the shop set Robear up for a speed dating event. Billy is forced to choose between his career and old friendships.
15	7	"Movin' On Up"	February 9, 2012	0.79
After walking out on his job at Wooster Street, Billy needs some help from Chris to get his own business off the ground. After realizing her true feelings for a close friend, Megan wonders if pursuing it is worth jeopardizing their friendship.
16	8	"Living the Dream"	February 16, 2012	0.78
Megan begins to move into her New York City pad. Missing his native California, Tim drags Ami out to the beach to go surfing. Jessica shows Tommy some of the tattoos she's been inking on the side, but not everyone is happy about it.
17	9	"Now or Never"	February 23, 2012	0.72
Ami is faced with a difficult decision when he learns what Jessica has been doing behind his back. Megan plans to move into her own apartment, but her new boyfriend Joey might derail her plans. Tension builds when a secret is revealed.
18	10	"Fight or Flight"	March 1, 2012	0.84
Upset with Chris trash talking the business to anyone and everyone, Ami confronts him. Tim must step up to help keep Wooster Street running smoothly. Megan struggles to decide whether or not to follow her newest guy or keep building her career.

=== Season 3 (2013) ===
No. overall	No. in season	Title	Original release date	U.S. viewers (millions)
19	1	"New Kids on the Block"	April 4, 2013	0.76
Ami introduces the newest staff to the shop. Brantley Gilbert stops by to have Tommy Montoya complete a sleeve tattoo. Megan takes on a new client that doesn't speak English but she has the attractive recent new employee assist her. Later, Ami gets a visitor from his past and deals with the headache of artist Lee Rodriguez.
20	2	"Achy Breaky Back & Yoji's Bathroom Bound"	April 11, 2013	0.77
Rodrigo has been having horrid back pain, which results in Yoji and him going to an acupuncturist in Chinatown.
21	3	"While Ami's Away, the Clients Will Pay"	April 18, 2013	0.92
One of the newer employees, Lee gets orders from Tommy to help tattoo when the shop gets busy despite Ami stating that Lee isn't supposed tattoo real clients.
22	4	"Boobs, Burlesque and a Crotch Tattoo"	April 25, 2013	0.71
A female customer comes storming into the shop claiming that Lee offered her a free tattoo while he was drunk. Lee also has to deal with figuring out if he cheated on his girlfriend or not. A client informs Megan about her future with her boyfriend.
23	5	"Granny Is Inked and Ami Is Angry!"	May 2, 2013	0.61
More than 100 customers have lined up to see Tim Hendricks but are annoyed after he does not show up. Tommy's tattoo skills are put to the test when an octogenarian comes for her first tattoo.

== See also ==
- List of tattoo TV shows
