= Megan Massacre =

American tattoo artist

- Born: Megan Woznicki; September 8, 1985 (age 40); Philadelphia, Pennsylvania, U.S.
- Occupation: Tattoo artist
- Website: www.meganmassacre.com

Megan Woznicki (born September 8, 1985), professionally known as Megan Massacre, is an American tattoo artist. She is best known for her appearances on the TLC reality television shows NY Ink and America's Worst Tattoos. She grew up with a passion for all forms of art. She became so good with a calligraphic pen that, in high school, she made money doing wedding invitations.

Her interest in tattooing began when she was 14 years old, but she had to wait a few years to start learning the technique because of her age and because she lacked the money to pay for classes. At age 18, she did her first tattoo piece. To make tattooing a full-time job, she quit her job at a furniture store. She bounced around from shop to shop to learn new styles, and once she felt confident enough, she would move on to another shop. A few years later, her tattoo work was published for the first time on a local magazine cover with her Megan Massacre nickname. In 2010, she got an offer to appear on the TLC reality television show NY Ink. She then also appeared on other tattoo-related shows Bondi Ink Tattoo and America's Worst Tattoos. In 2014, she opened a tattoo shop, Grit n Glory, in New York City. She has more than one million followers on Instagram and celebrity clients like Zayn Malik.

In 2021, Inked included her in its list of the "10 Female Artists Who've Changed the Tattoo Industry".

She is also an animal enthusiast, supporting the ASPCA and PETA and living a vegetarian lifestyle.

== Filmography ==
=== Television ===
Year	Title	Notes
2011–2013	NY Ink	23 episodes
2012–2014	America's Worst Tattoos	18 episodes
2015	My Big Fat Fabulous Life	1 episode
2015–2017	Bondi Ink Tattoo	20 episodes

=== Music Videos ===
Year	Title	Artist
2010	Melrose Diner	The Wonder Years

== Books ==
- Marked in Ink (2016)
- The Art of Tattoo (2019)
