= Don Munroe =

Canadian ice hockey player

- Born: 1927 or 1928 Toronto, Ontario, Canada
- Weight: 167 lb (76 kg; 11 st 13 lb)
- Position: Left wing
- Shot: Left
- Played for: Sudbury Wolves
- National team: Canada
- Playing career: 1948–1949
Medal record
Men's ice hockey
Silver medal – second place	1949 Stockholm	Ice hockey

Don Munroe (born 1927 or 1928) was a Canadian ice hockey player with the Sudbury Wolves. He won a silver medal at the 1949 World Ice Hockey Championships in Stockholm, Sweden.
