= Gypsys Gift =

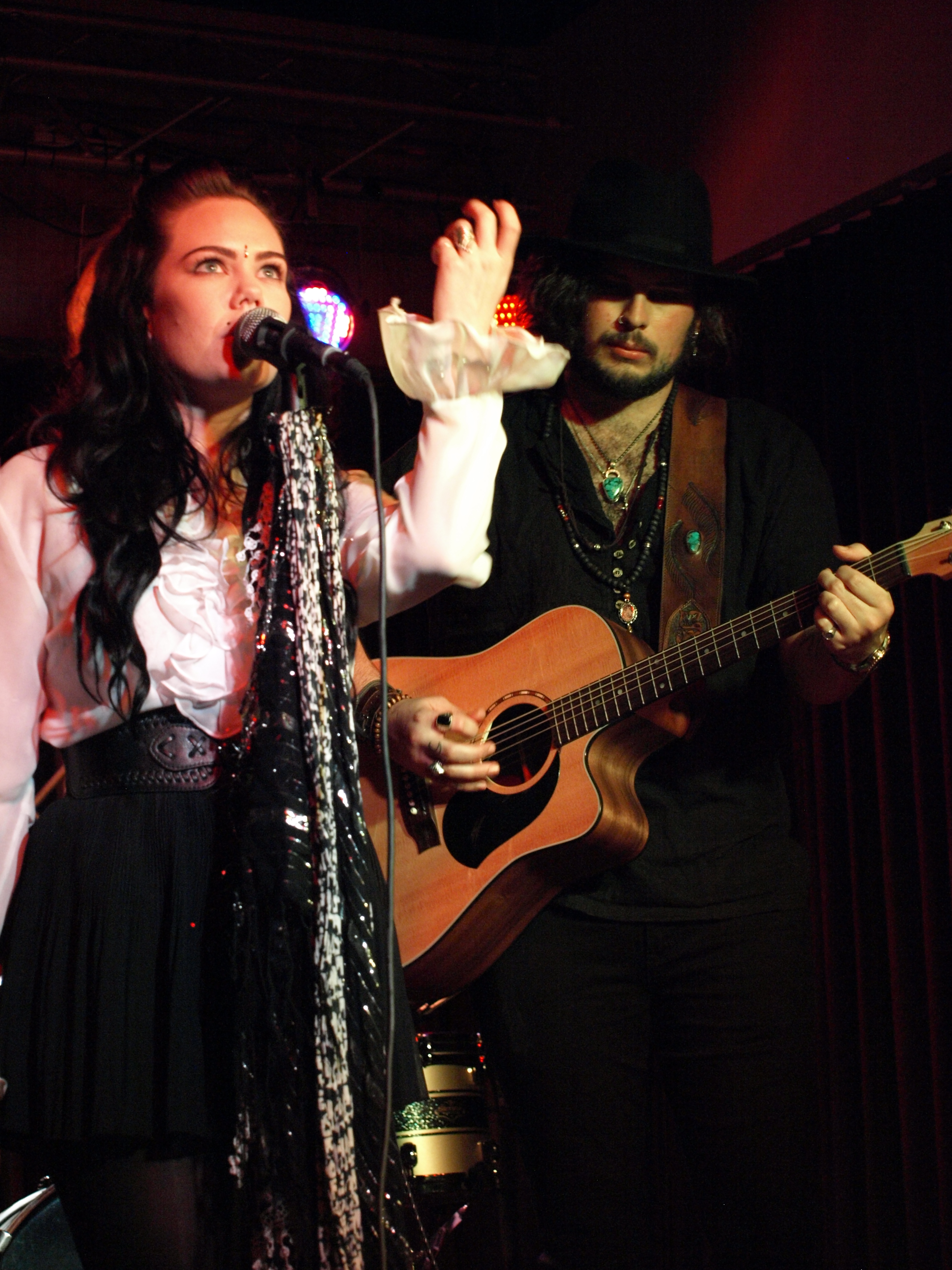
- Gypsys Gift in 2014

Background information
- Origin: Australia
- Genres: Indie rock, Indie pop, Chamber rock, Heavy folk, Baroque pop
- Years active: 2011 – current

Gypsys Gift is a five-piece chamber rock band from Sydney. Gypsys Gift is composed of Gemma Ameera (vocals, piano, tambourine), Jimi May (lead guitar, backing vocals), Daniel Tsoltoudis (drums), Alex Milano (bass guitar).

== Music career ==
Gypsys Gift was formed in 2011 by Gemma Ameera and Jimi May. Gemma Ameera was a solo artist (known as Ameera), a singer-songwriter whose song Shine reached number 19 on the Australian ARIA Charts, and Jimi May was playing in Sydney band The Next (whose EP Rock & Roll Revolution hit number 1 on the physical charts) when the pair, who were under the same management, met and formed Gypsys Gift. Their first single Flowing was picked up for airplay by Triple J, and became the seventh most downloaded song for community radio Australia-wide. Their third single Lullaby reached number nine on the iTunes singer-songwriter charts, and was picked up for regular rotational play by 'Country Music Channel' on Australian cable TV group Foxtel.

== Awards and nominations ==
In 2013, Gypsys Gift were nominated for seven awards at the annual Australian Independent Music Awards, their song The Fight winning Best World/Folk song.

== Influences ==
Gypsys Gift cite their influences to include The Doors, Florence and the Machine, Fleetwood Mac, Bob Dylan, The Beatles, Jeff Buckley, Bruce Springsteen, and Janis Joplin.

== Discography ==
- The Fight (single) – 2012
- Flowing (single) – 2012
- Lullaby (single) – 2014
