= Yoji Harada =

Japanese tattoo artist and musician (1972–2019)

Yōji Harada
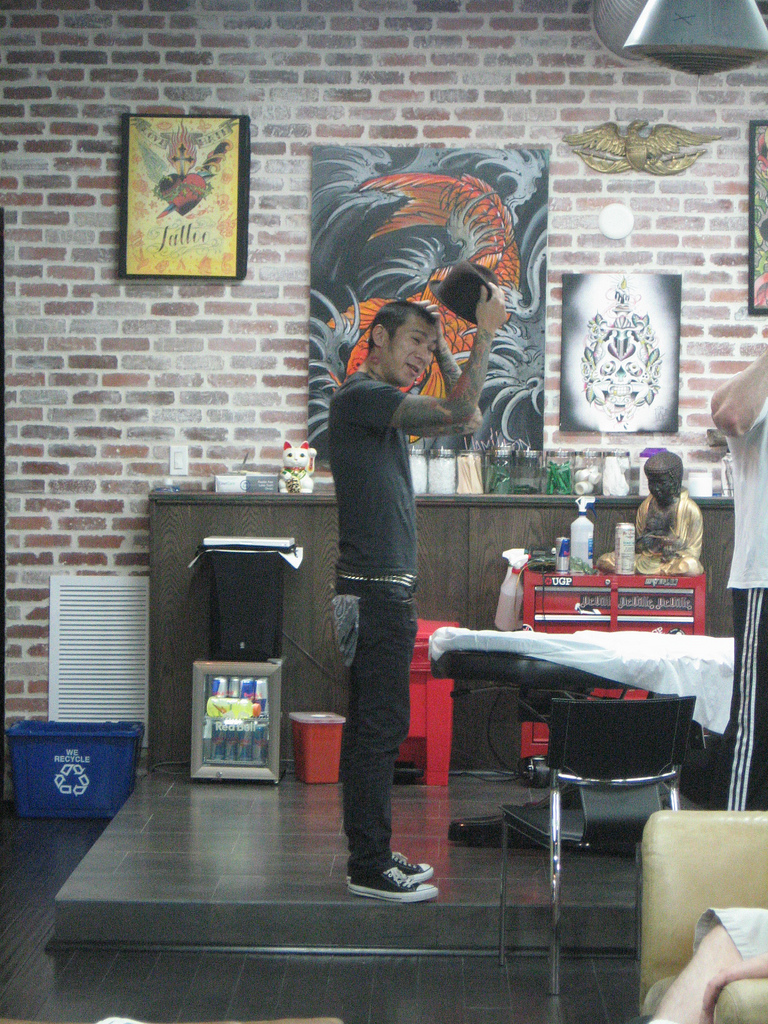
- Yoji Harada in January 2008
- Born: 原田 洋二郎 (Harada Yōjirō); 6 August 1972; Tokyo, Japan
- Died: 27 March 2019 (aged 46); Netherlands
- Occupation(s): Tattoo artist Television personality Musician
- Spouses: Bridget (m. 2005–2009) Bonnie Minkus (m. 1996–2003)

Yojiro "Yoji" Harada (原田 洋二郎, Harada Yōjirō) (6 August 1972 – 27 March 2019) was a Japanese tattoo artist and musician who gained fame from his appearances in the TLC reality show Miami Ink.
