= Charlie Corwin =

American media executive

- Born: New York City, U.S.
- Occupations: Media executive, film producer

Charlie Corwin is an American media executive and a film and television producer. He is CEO of SK Global, an independent content studio. In 2022, Centricus, the London-based private equity bank, acquired a majority stake in SK Global.

Formerly, Corwin was the CEO of Imagine Entertainment and Co-Chairman and CEO of Endemol Shine Americas. His productions have been nominated for Oscars, Emmys, Golden Globes, and Spirit Awards. Among them are “The Squid and the Whale,” “Half Nelson,” “A Guide to Recognizing Your Saints,” “August,” “Twelve”, and “Sunlight Jr.”

== Early life and education ==
Charlie Corwin was born and raised in New York City. He is a graduate of Horace Mann School, The University of Wisconsin, and New York University School of Law.

== Career ==
Corwin is CEO of SK Global, a content studio based in Los Angeles. They were selected as one of Fast Company’s “Top 10 Most Innovative Companies of 2020” in the film and TV sector and has a long history of working collaboratively with leading filmmakers and top-tier talent. SK Global has financed and produced more than 100 feature films and television – including the Golden Globe-nominated “Crazy Rich Asians”, International Emmy-winning Indian series “Delhi Crime”, Oscar-nominated “Hell or High Water”, and ”The Wailing” among many others. Recently, SK Global released “Thai Cave Rescue”, its new series with Netflix in Thailand.

In 2022, SK Global acquired Critical Content, the largely unscripted producer behind “Catfish” (MTV), the Daytime Emmy-nominated “Get Organized with the Home Edit” (Netflix), and the Kevin Hart-fronted “Celebrity Game Face”.

In 2018, Corwin joined the advisory board of Uproxx, a digital media company owned by WarnerMedia.

In 2016, Corwin became the CEO of Imagine Entertainment, the Oscar winning production company co-founded by Ron Howard and Brian Grazer. Corwin joined the company along with a majority acquisition by Raine Group to spearhead a growth strategy of expanding Imagine into a global independent studio. While there, he completed two separate capital investments from Chinese companies and seeded the M&A strategy to broaden Imagine's capability to create a wider variety of content genres.

In 2012, Corwin became Co-Chairman and CEO of Endemol Shine North America, the parent company of Original Media and a global independent content studio, producer and distributor with a diverse portfolio of companies behind some prominent hit television formats and series in the world. Corwin oversaw all programming, including series such as “Big Brother” (CBS) and “MasterChef” (FOX) and scripted series from its Endemol Shine Studios, producers of “Hell on Wheels” (AMC) and “Kingdom” (Netflix).

In 2002, Corwin co-founded and led Original Media as its CEO until Endemol acquired a majority stake in 2007, where he remained CEO and continued to grow the business. There, Corwin was an award-winning film and TV producer, and acclaimed for his box office successes. Corwin is widely considered an innovator for his creation of subculture-specific docu-series such as “Miami Ink” (TLC) and its popular spinoffs, “LA Ink” and “NY Ink”, as well as the breakout successes “Swamp People” (History) and “Storm Chasers” (Discovery). He also co-created “Comic Book Men" (AMC) with Kevin Smith and "The Rachel Zoe Project” (Bravo). In 2009, he co-created the scripted drama “The Philanthropist” for NBC with Tom Fontana and Jim Juvonen.

Corwin began his career as an entrepreneur in 1999 at the Internet start-up Live Music Channel, a pioneer in video streaming and a leading provider of live concert performances for television and the internet. He was Co-Founder and President.
