= Miami Ink =

American reality television series (2005–2008)

- Starring: Ami James; Chris Núñez; Chris Garver; Darren Brass; Yoji Harada; Saru Sammyr; Tim Hendricks; Kat Von D Eric Kessingland
- Opening theme: "Funky Kingston" by Toots and the Maytals
- Country of origin: United States
- Original language: English
- No. of seasons: 6
- No. of episodes: 80

Production
- Executive producers: Charlie Corwin; Clara Markowitz; Jamie Shutz
- Running time: 45–48 minutes

Original release
- Network: TLC
- Release: July 19, 2005 – August 21, 2008

Related
- LA Ink; London Ink; NY Ink

Miami Ink is an American reality television series that aired on TLC from 2005 to 2008 and follows the events that took place at a tattoo shop in Miami Beach, Florida. The show led to several spin-offs, including the shows LA Ink, London Ink, NY Ink, and Madrid Ink, most of which were also broadcast on TLC.

== History ==
The shop, which opened in 2004, was called 305 Ink (referencing a Miami area code) before the show started. Later changed to Love Hate Tattoo, it is co-owned by tattoo artists Ami James and Chris Núñez, and at the time of the show, also featured artists Chris Garver, Darren Brass, Luke Wessman, Morgan Pennypacker, Tim Hendricks and Yoji Harada.

Kat Von D joined the shop during the show's first season while Brass had an injured arm. She then returned as a full-time crew member for three seasons, after which she moved to Los Angeles and landed her own Miami Ink spin-off, LA Ink, which premiered in August 2007. The first 6 episodes of Miami Ink were directed by David Roma, an influential member of creating the format.

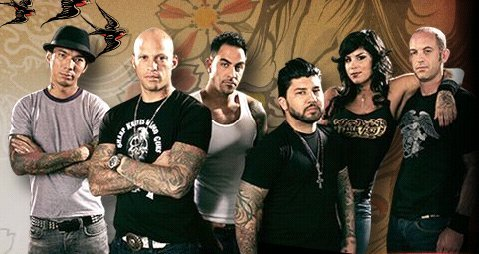
Cast of Miami Ink

Each episode featured multiple customers and detailed their backstories and motivations for choosing their tattoos. In addition, there was some focus on the personal lives of the artists. Most of the episodes are narrated by James, with Núñez occasionally filling in.

The main musical theme for the show is "Funky Kingston" by Toots & the Maytals. The show has on occasion featured such guests as Paul Teutul Sr. from American Chopper.

== NY Ink ==
Since Miami Ink went off air, James moved to New York City in 2011 and opened a tattoo studio there, named the Wooster St. Social Club. He teamed up with David Roma and Charlie Corwin to detail the proceedings in the shop on NY Ink, which premiered June 2, 2011 on TLC.

== Celebrity customers ==
- Frank Iero MCR Guitarist
- Brantley Gilbert, Country Singer
- A.B. Quintanilla, Mexican-American musician and producer
- Anthony Bourdain, celebrity chef
- Bam Margera, professional skateboarder and actor
- Chris Jacobs, host of TLC's Overhaulin'
- Craig Ferguson, actor and comedian
- DJ Skribble, DJ
- Evan Seinfeld, vocalist for Biohazard and adult film star
- Gianna Lynn, adult film star
- H_{2}O, band
- Harold Hunter, skateboarder
- Irvin Mayfield, Trumpetuer
- Ivy Supersonic, fashion designer
- Jesse Hughes, musician of Eagles of Death Metal
- Joe Hursley, Lead Singer of The Ringers
- Johnny Messner, actor
- Leo Nocentelli, Guitarist for The Meters
- Lloyd Banks, rapper
- Mark Zupan, athlete
- MickDeth, bassist for Eighteen Visions
- Monica Martin, bodybuilder
- Mr. J. Medeiros, Emcee/Producer
- Paul Teutul Sr., Owner of Orange County Choppers American Chopper
- Paula Meronek, TV personality from The Real World: Key West
- Phil Varone, drummer of Skid Row and Saigon Kick
- Reginald 'Fieldy' Arvizu, bassist for Korn
- Roger Miret, vocalist for Agnostic Front
- Sunny Garcia, pro surfer
- Syrus Yarbrough, TV personality from The Real World: Boston

== Episode list ==
Season 1 (10 episodes)

- Season 1 Episode 1 – Five Friends (Prem. 7/19/05)
- Season 1 Episode 2 – Never Forget (Prem. 7/26/05)
- Season 1 Episode 3 – In Memory Of... (Prem. 8/2/05)
- Season 1 Episode 4 – Growing Up (Prem. 8/9/05)
- Season 1 Episode 5 – The Apprentice (Prem. 8/16/05)
- Season 1 Episode 6 – The Family (Prem. 8/23/05)
- Season 1 Episode 7 – Going For The Gold (Prem. 9/6/05)
- Season 1 Episode 8 – Bad Break (Prem. 9/13/05)
- Season 1 Episode 9 – Kat's In The Groove (Prem. 9/20/05)
- Season 1 Episode 10 – Finding Balance (Prem. 9/27/05)

Season 2 (11 episodes)

- Season 2 Episode 11 – More Money, More Problems (Prem. 1/10/06)
- Season 2 Episode 12 – Step up or Step Out (Prem. 1/17/06)
- Season 2 Episode 13 – Weathering The Storm (Prem. 1/31/06)
- Season 2 Episode 14 – Party All The Time (Prem. 1/24/06)
- Season 2 Episode 15 – Kat's Return, Ami's Ride (Prem. 2/7/06)
- Season 2 Episode 16 – The Ink That Binds (Prem. 3/14/06)
- Season 2 Episode 17 – While Ami's Away...(Prem. 2/28/06)
- Season 2 Episode 18 – Rock 'n' Roll All Night (Prem. 3/7/06)
- Season 2 Episode 19 – Goodbye Freedom (Prem. 4/4/06)
- Season 2 Episode 20 – Made In Japan (Prem. 4/11/06)
- Season 2 Episode 21 – Hawaii (Prem. 1/8/06)

Season 3 (13 episodes)

- Season 3 Episode 1 – Yoji's Initiation (Prem. 7/25/06)
- Season 3 Episode 2 – Saver or Spender (Prem. 7/18/06)
- Season 3 Episode 3 – Woman In a Man's World (Prem. 8/1/06)
- Season 3 Episode 4 – The Ultimate Job Interview (Prem. 8/8/06)
- Season 3 Episode 5 – We're All Family (Prem. 8/15/06)
- Season 3 Episode 6 – Kat The Party Machine (Prem. 8/22/06)
- Season 3 Episode 7 – Garver's Ultimatum (Prem. 8/29/06)
- Season 3 Episode 8 – Kat: A Fish Out Of Water (Prem. 9/5/06)
- Season 3 Episode 9 – Ami's Bad Side (Prem. 9/12/06)
- Season 3 Episode 10 – Kat's Niche (Prem. 9/19/06)
- Season 3 Episode 11 – Lloyd Banks and the Rotten Apple (Prem. 10/10/06)
- Season 3 Episode 12 – Kat & Ami Tattoo The Troops (Prem. 10/17/06)
- Season 3 Episode 13 – Bye-Bye Bridgette (Prem. 10/24/06)

Season 4 (20 episodes)

- Season 4 Episode 1 – Sink Or Swim (Prem. 10/31/06)
- Season 4 Episode 2 – The Jeep (Prem. 11/07/06)
- Season 4 Episode 3 – History Of The Circus Sideshow (Prem. 11/28/06)
- Season 4 Episode 4 – A Disgruntled Yoji (Prem. 12/5/06)
- Season 4 Episode 5 – Von D Family Bonding (Prem. 12/12/06)
- Season 4 Episode 6 – The Car Star (Prem. 12/19/06)
- Season 4 Episode 7 – Garver's Injury (Prem. 12/26/06)
- Season 4 Episode 8 – Battle Of The Apprentices (Prem. 1/23/07)
- Season 4 Episode 9 – Shop Party (Prem. 1/30/07)
- Season 4 Episode 10 – Yoji's Big Move (Prem. 2/6/07)
- Season 4 Episode 11 – Family Values Tour (Prem. 2/13/07)
- Season 4 Episode 12 – Nobody Likes a Quitter (Prem. 2/27/07)
- Season 4 Episode 13 – Bella Boot Camp (Prem. 3/6/07)
- Season 4 Episode 14 – Kat and Oliver Quality Time (Prem. 3/13/07)
- Season 4 Episode 15 – Back To Their Roots (Prem. 3/20/07)
- Season 4 Episode 16 – Kat's Cooking (Prem. 3/27/07)
- Season 4 Episode 17 – Yoji's Dilemma (Prem. 4/3/07)
- Season 4 Episode 18 – American Chopper (Prem. 5/1/07)
- Season 4 Episode 19 – Ami and Nunez Buy A Bar (Prem. 4/24/07)
- Season 4 Episode 20 – Tensions Rock The Shop (Prem. 5/8/07)

Season 5 (13 episodes)

- Season 5 Episode 1 – New Artist Search (Prem. 6/12/07)
- Season 5 Episode 2 – Staff, Staff, Staff (Prem. 6/19/07)
- Season 5 Episode 3 – Old Friends (Prem. 6/26/07)
- Season 5 Episode 4 – Facing Changes (Prem. 7/3/07)
- Season 5 Episode 5 – Garver Gets Commissioned (Prem. 7/17/07)
- Season 5 Episode 6 – Viva Las Vegas (Prem. 7/24/07)
- Season 5 Episode 7 – Nothing Lasts Forever (Prem. 7/31/07)
- Season 5 Episode 8 – No Regrets (Prem. 11/6/07)
- Season 5 Episode 9 – Ami's Anger (Prem. 11/13/07)
- Season 5 Episode 10 – Skate Or Die (Prem. 11/20/07)
- Season 5 Episode 11 – Speed Racer (Prem. 11/27/07)
- Season 5 Episode 12 – Makin' The Big Leagues (Prem. 12/4/07)
- Season 5 Episode 13 – Through Thick and Thin (Prem. 12/11/07)

Season 6 (13 episodes)

- Season 6 Episode 1 – Make or Break (Prem. 4/24/08)
- Season 6 Episode 2 – We Are Family (Prem. 5/1/08)
- Season 6 Episode 3 – Tim's Pinups (Prem. 5/8/08)
- Season 6 Episode 4 – House Hunting (Prem. 5/15/08)
- Season 6 Episode 5 – Ami Animates (Prem. 5/22/08)
- Season 6 Episode 6 – Blast Off! (Prem. 6/5/08)
- Season 6 Episode 7 – Dre's Stylin' (Prem. 6/12/08)
- Season 6 Episode 8 – Ami and Yoji Come To Blows (Prem. 7/3/08)
- Season 6 Episode 9 – Dre Demands Respect (Prem. 7/10/08)
- Season 6 Episode 10 – Ruthless and Toothless (Prem. 7/24/08)
- Season 6 Episode 11 – New Orleans Special (Prem. 8/7/08)
- Season 6 Episode 12 – Hanging With The Harada's (Prem. 8/14/08)
- Season 6 Episode 13 – A Baby Makes Three (Prem. 8/21/08)

== International screenings ==
Miami Ink has been shown mainly on channels of the Discovery Network, including Discovery Real Time (UK, Ireland, France, Italy), the Discovery Channel (Norway, Poland, Denmark, Romania, Finland, The Netherlands, South Africa, Namibia, Belgium, Turkey, Portugal, Czech, Spain), DMAX (UK, Italy, Ireland and Germany), Discovery Travel and Living (Croatia, India, Italy, Russia, Serbia, Indonesia, Australia, New Zealand, Poland, Romania, Bulgaria, Hungary, Macedonia, Denmark, Singapore, Portugal, Hong Kong) and TLC (Latin America, Spain and Brazil). It has also been broadcast by Viasat 4 (Norway), TV6 (Sweden), TV3+ (Denmark), Numéro 23 (France) and Jim (Finland).

== See also ==
- David Roma
- List of tattoo TV shows
