= Chris Garver =

American tattoo artist

Christopher Garver
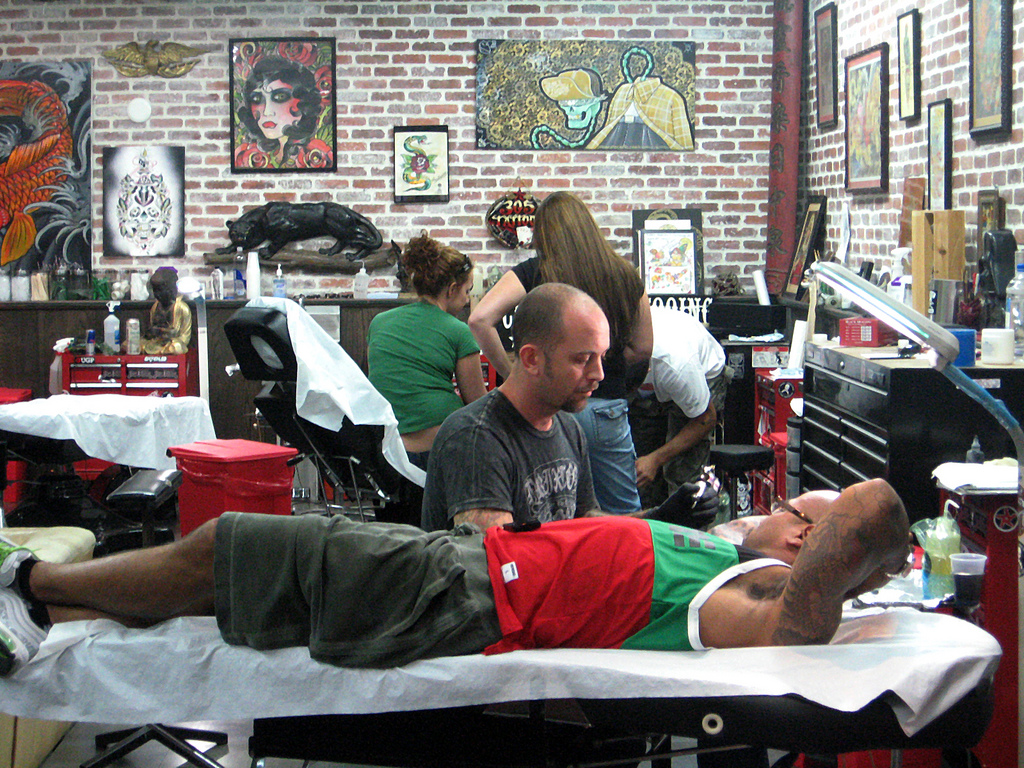
- Born: Pittsburgh, Pennsylvania, U.S.
- Occupations: Tattoo artist Television personality

Chris Garver is an American tattoo artist and television personality, best known for his appearance on the TLC reality television show Miami Ink.

== Biography ==
Garver was born and raised in Pittsburgh, Pennsylvania, where he attended the Pittsburgh High School for the Creative and Performing Arts. Garver's mother was an artist and encouraged his interest in painting and drawing.

He first experimented with tattooing at age 17, after selling his bass guitar in order to purchase his tattoo equipment. Garver attended the School of Visual Arts. He apprenticed for six months before tattooing, and repaired old tattoos that needed touch-ups, before he started tattooing clients on his own. In his early twenties, Garver moved to New York City, where he became a full-time professional tattoo artist.
