= Ami James =

Israeli-American tattoo artist

- עמי ג'יימס
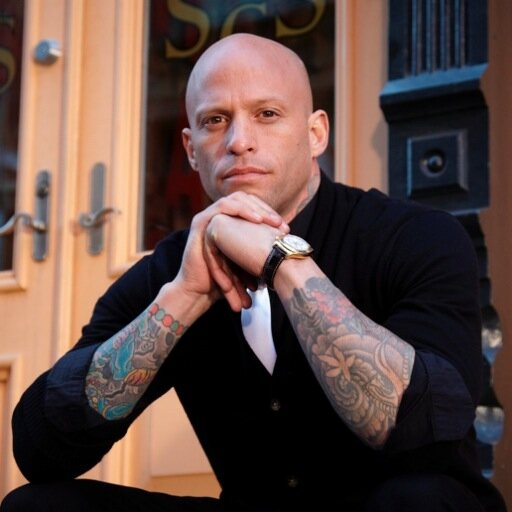
- Born: Amie James; 8 April 1972 (age 54); Sharm El Sheikh, Egypt (then occupied by Israel)
- Occupations: Tattoo artist Television personality
- Children: 2

Ami James (Hebrew: עמי ג'יימס; born 6 April 1972) is an Israeli-American tattoo artist, television personality and entrepreneur.

== Early life ==
James was born in Sharm El Sheikh, Egypt (then-occupied by Israel). His American-born father converted to Judaism three years prior to moving to Israel. Once residing in Israel, his father joined the Israeli army and met James' mother, who had emigrated from Romania. James lived in both Israel and Egypt as a child, but when James was four years old, his father left their family.

Struggling with severe ADD, James explained that he was drawn into art and tattooing from a young age, disclosing that his father had tattoos and was a painter.

James moved to the United States around age 11 where he lived with his paternal grandparents before moving to Miami at age 12. At the age of 15, James received his first tattoo, an experience that left him determined to become a tattoo artist, himself. In his adolescence, James moved back to Israel and entered military service in the Israel Defense Forces as an Infantry sniper.

== Career ==
In 1992, he started his apprenticeship with tattoo artist Lou at Tattoos By Lou. He is the co-owner (with Chris Núñez) of the Miami Beach, Florida tattoo parlor Love Hate Tattoos, the subject of the TLC reality television program, Miami Ink. James also co-owns the DeVille clothing company with Núñez and Jesse Fleet, and the Miami nightclub Love Hate Lounge, with Núñez and two other close friends. He has also created designs for Motorola's RAZR V3 mobile phones. His wife, Jordan, gave birth to their first child on 3 August 2008. Their second child, a daughter, was born 8 May 2012.

James has also recently invested in a jewelry line, Love Hate Choppers Jewelry, with Boston jeweler Larry Weymouth.

In 1996 he lived for a few months in Denmark, where he did tattoos.

He revealed on his blog that he was moving to New York and that his new show NY Ink planned to begin filming in March 2011. The show premiered on 2 June 2011. Season 2 of NY Ink premiered in December 2011 and ran through 1 March 2012.

It was announced that Ami James was opening a tattoo studio, 'Love Hate Social Club' in London, UK in November 2012. The tattoo studio had a number of guest tattoo artists including, Darren Brass, Megan Massacre and Chris Núñez.

In 2013 James teamed up with PETA in an ad for their "Ink Not Mink" campaign.

James also co-founded Tattoodo, an online platform for getting a custom tattoo design, which launched on 9 May 2013.

In 2022, James became a judge on Ink Master during its fourteenth season, replacing Nuñez and Oliver Peck.
