= Tattoo =

Skin modification using ink to create designs

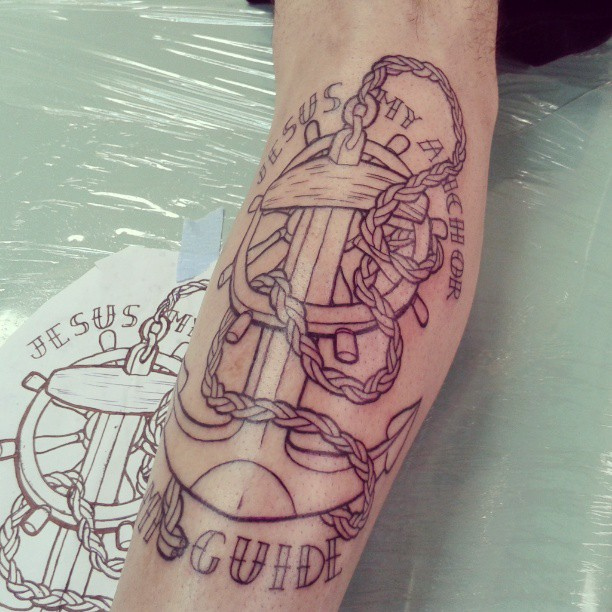
A tattoo in progress with a rope-and-anchor design inspired by traditional sailor tattoos, alongside a sketch of the design

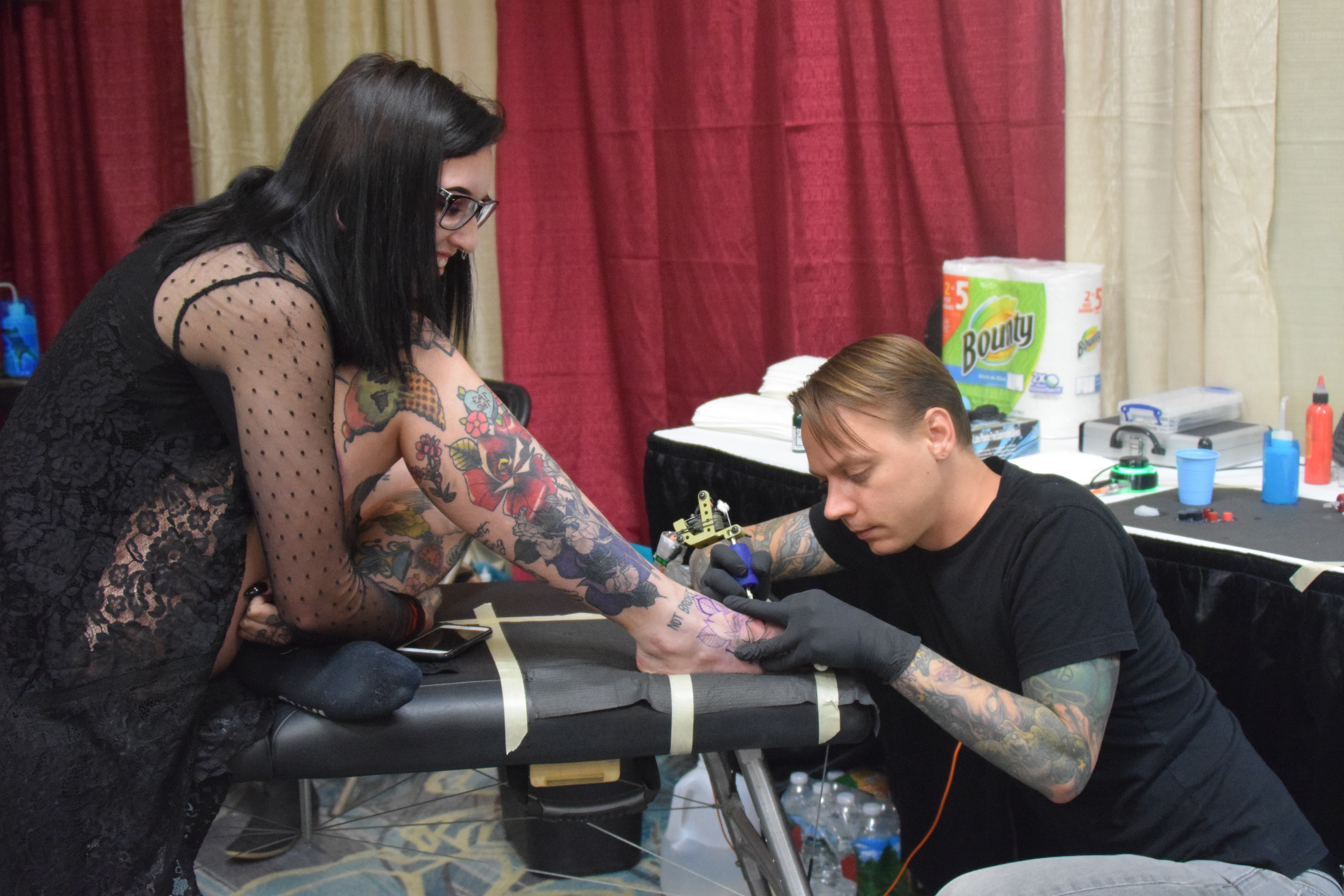
Application of a tattoo to a woman's foot

A tattoo is a form of body modification made by inserting tattoo ink, dyes, or pigments, either indelible or temporary, into the dermis layer of the skin to form a design. Tattoo artists create these designs using several tattooing processes and techniques, including hand-tapped traditional tattoos and modern tattoo machines. The history of tattooing goes back to Neolithic times, practiced across the globe by many cultures, and the symbolism and impact of tattoos varies in different places and cultures.

Tattoos may be decorative (with no specific meaning), symbolic (with a specific meaning to the wearer), pictorial (a depiction of a specific person or item), or textual (words or pictographs from written languages). Many tattoos serve as rites of passage, marks of status and rank, symbols of religious and spiritual devotion, decorations for bravery, marks of fertility, pledges of love, amulets and talismans, protection, and as punishment, like the marks of outcasts, slaves, and convicts. Extensive decorative tattooing has also been part of the work of performance artists such as tattooed ladies.

Although tattoo art has existed at least since the first known tattooed person, Ötzi, lived around the year 3330 BCE, the way society perceives tattoos has varied immensely throughout history. In the 20th century, tattoo art throughout most of the world was associated with certain lifestyles, notably sailors and prisoners (see sailor tattoos and prison tattooing). In the 21st century, people choose to be tattooed for artistic, cosmetic, sentimental/memorial, religious, and spiritual reasons, or to symbolize their belonging to or identification with particular groups, including criminal gangs (see criminal tattoos) or a particular ethnic group or law-abiding subculture. Tattoos may show how a person feels about a relative (commonly a parent or child) or about an unrelated person. Tattoos can also be used for functional purposes, such as identification, permanent makeup, and medical purposes.

== Terminology ==
The word tattoo, or tattow in the 18th century, is a loanword from the Samoan word tatau, meaning "to strike", from Proto-Oceanic *sau₃ referring to a wingbone from a flying fox used as an instrument for the tattooing process. The Oxford English Dictionary gives the etymology of tattoo as "In 18th c. tattaow, tattow. From Polynesian (Samoan, Tahitian, Tongan, etc.) tatau. In Marquesan, tatu." Before the importation of the Polynesian word, the practice of tattooing had been described in the West as painting, scarring, or staining.

The etymology of the body modification term is not to be confused with the origins of the word for the military drumbeat or performance. In this case, the English word "tattoo" is derived from the Dutch word taptoe.

Ready-made tattoo designs are known as "flash". Flash sheets are prominently displayed in many tattoo parlors to enable customers to select a predrawn image or use them as inspiration for a custom image. Flash may be mass-produced or drawn by tattoo artists who work there.

The Japanese word irezumi means "insertion of ink" and can mean tattoos using tebori, the traditional Japanese hand method, a Western-style machine, or any method of tattooing using insertion of ink. Another word used for traditional Japanese tattoo designs is horimono. Japanese may use the Western word tattoo as a loan word meaning any non-Japanese styles of tattooing.

British anthropologist Ling Roth in 1900 described four methods of skin marking and suggested they be differentiated under the names "tatu", "moko", "cicatrix", and "keloid". The first is by pricking that leaves the skin smooth as found in places including the Pacific Islands. The second is a tattoo combined with chiseling to leave furrows in the skin as found in places including New Zealand. The third is scarification using a knife or chisel as found in places including West Africa. The fourth and the last is scarification by irritating and reopening a pre-existing wound, and rescarification to form a raised scar as found in places including Tasmania, Australia, Melanesia, and Central Africa.

== Types ==
Some tattoos have practical utility, such as this finger ruler

The American Academy of Dermatology distinguishes five types of tattoos: traumatic tattoos that result from injuries, such as asphalt from road injuries or pencil lead; amateur tattoos; professional tattoos, both via traditional methods and modern tattoo machines; cosmetic tattoos, also known as "permanent makeup"; and medical tattoos.

=== Traumatic tattoos ===
A traumatic tattoo occurs when a substance such as asphalt or gunpowder is rubbed into a wound as the result of some kind of accident or trauma. When this involves carbon, dermatologists may call the mark a carbon stain instead of a tattoo. Coal miners could develop characteristic marks, called collier's stripes, because of coal dust getting into scratches and other small wounds. An amalgam tattoo is when amalgam particles are implanted in to the soft tissues of the mouth, usually the gums, during dental filling placement or removal. Another example of such accidental tattoos is the result of a deliberate or accidental stabbing with a pencil or pen, leaving graphite or ink beneath the skin.

=== Identification ===
==== Forcible tattooing for identification ====
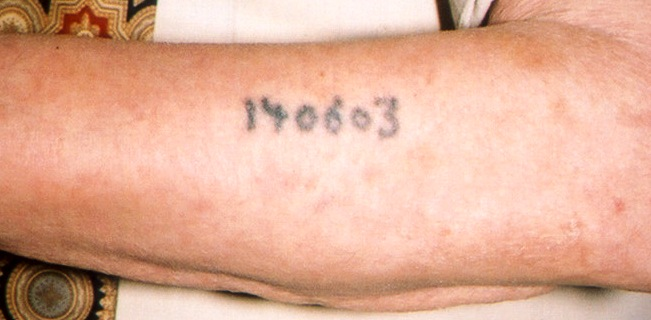
An identification tattoo on a survivor of the Auschwitz concentration camp

A well-known example is the Nazi practice of forcibly tattooing concentration camp inmates with identification numbers during the Holocaust as part of the Nazis' identification system, beginning in fall 1941. The SS introduced the practice at Auschwitz concentration camp to identify the bodies of registered prisoners in the concentration camps. During registration, guards would tattoo each prisoner with a number, usually on the left forearm, but sometimes on the chest or stomach. Of the Nazi concentration camps, only Auschwitz put tattoos on inmates. Prisoners found with tattoos in Mauthausen concentration camp and Buchenwald concentration camp upon liberation were presumably transported from Auschwitz by death march. The tattoo was the prisoner's camp number, sometimes with a special symbol added; some Jews had a triangle, and Romani had the letter "Z" (from German Zigeuner for "Gypsy"). In May 1944, Jewish men received the letters "A" or "B" to indicate a particular series of numbers.

As early as the Zhou, Chinese authorities employed facial tattoos as a punishment for certain crimes or to mark prisoners or slaves.

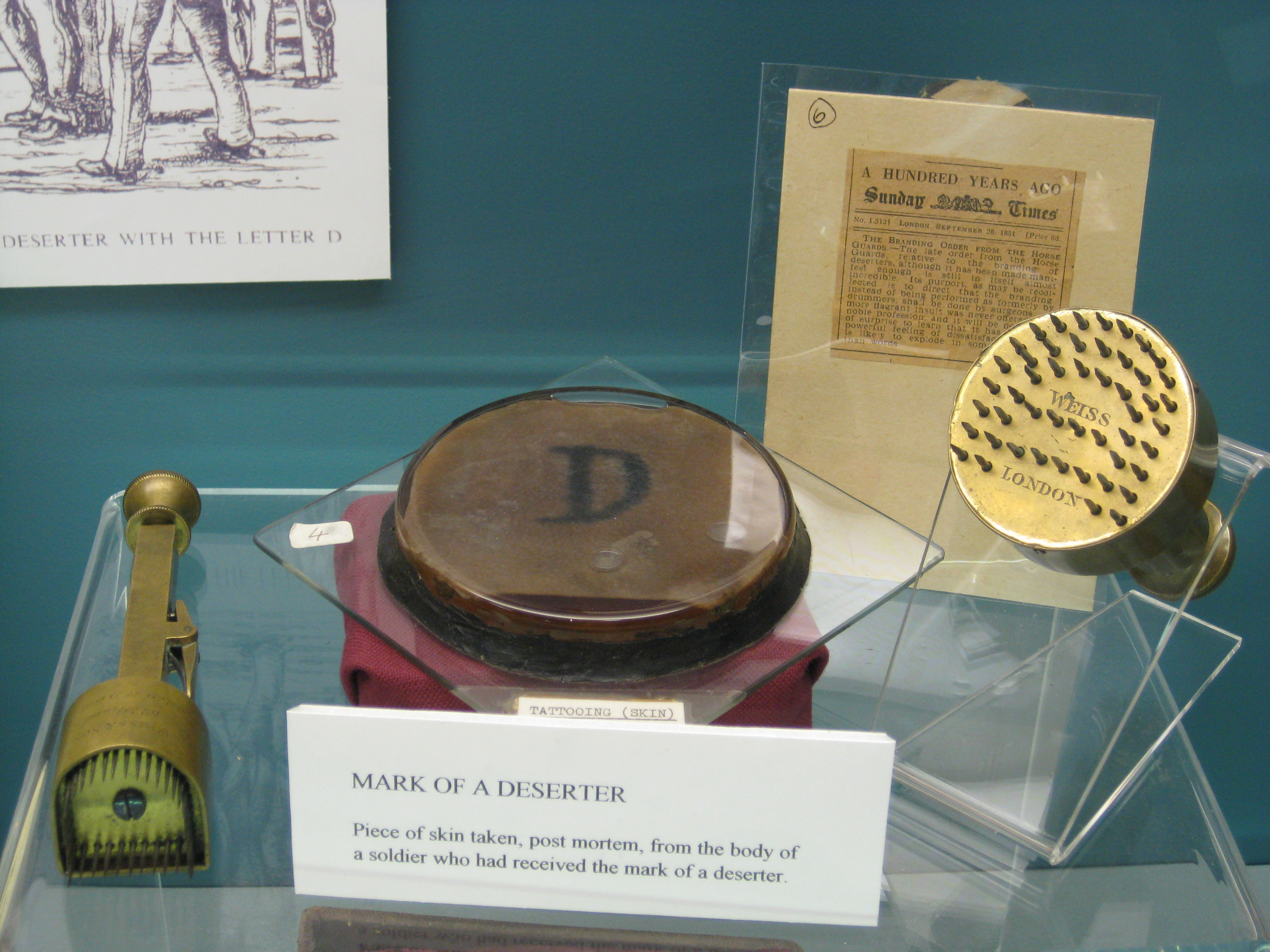
Tattoo marking a deserter from the British Army; skin removed post mortem

During the Roman Empire, gladiators and slaves were tattooed; exported slaves were tattooed with the words "tax paid", and it was a common practice to tattoo "fugitive" (denoted by the letters "FUG") on the foreheads of runaway slaves. Owing to the Biblical strictures against the practice, Emperor Constantine I banned tattooing the face around AD 330, and the Second Council of Nicaea banned all body markings as a pagan practice in AD 787.

==== In criminal investigations ====
These markings can potentially provide a wealth of information about an individual. Simple visual examinations, as well as more advanced digital recognition technologies, are employed to assist in identifying or providing clues about suspects or victims of crimes.

==== Postmortem identification ====
Tattoos are sometimes used by forensic pathologists to help them identify burned, putrefied, or mutilated bodies. As tattoo pigment lies encapsulated deep in the skin, tattoos are not easily destroyed even when the skin is burned.

==== Identification of animals ====
Pets, show animals, thoroughbred horses, and livestock are sometimes tattooed with animal identification marks. Ear tattoos are a method of identification for beef cattle. Tattooing with a slap mark on the shoulder or on the ear is the standard identification method in commercial pig farming. Branding is used for similar reasons and is often performed without anesthesia, but is different from tattooing, as no ink or dye is inserted during the process, the mark instead being caused by permanent scarring of the skin. Pet dogs and cats are sometimes tattooed with a serial number (usually in the ear, or on the inner thigh) via which their owners can be identified. However, the use of a microchip has become an increasingly popular choice and since 2016 is a legal requirement for all 8.5 million pet dogs in the UK. In Australia, desexed cats and dogs are marked with a tattoo on the inside of the ear.

=== Cosmetic ===
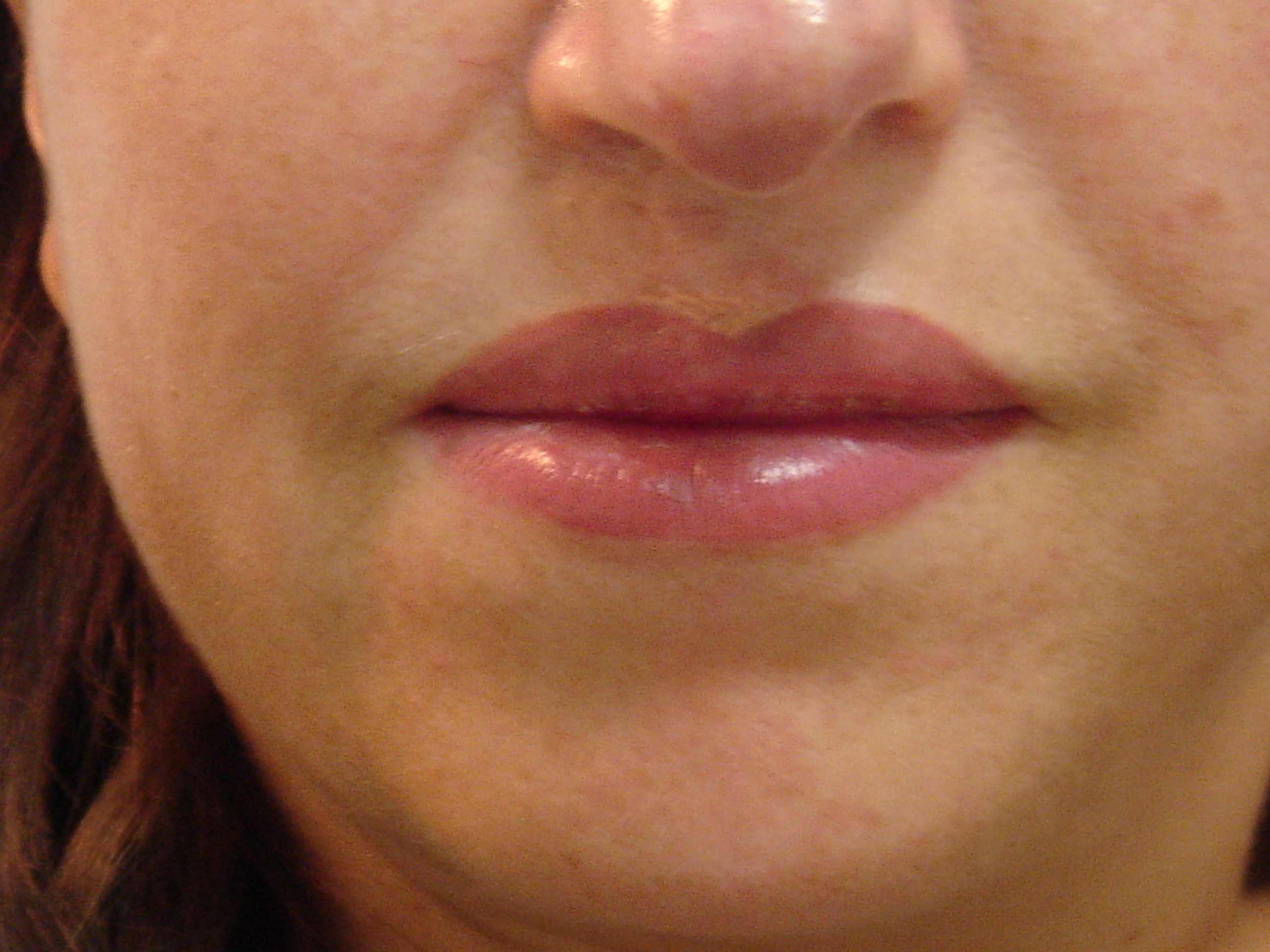
Tattooed lip makeup

Permanent makeup is the use of tattoos to create long-lasting eyebrows, lips (liner or lip blushing), eyes (permanent eyeliner), and even moles definition. Natural colors are used to mimic eyebrows and freckles, while diverse pigments for lips and eyeliner for a look akin to traditional makeup.

Another cosmetic tattooing trend is micropigmentation, which tattoo artists use to create the illusion of hair on the scalp. Often called scalp micropigmentation, this technique is popular among those experiencing hair loss, as it can mimic the look of a closely shaved head or add density to thinning areas. The process involves depositing tiny dots of pigment into the skin, creating a natural-looking shadow effect that blends seamlessly with existing hair.

=== Medical ===
Medical tattoos are used to ensure instruments are properly located for repeated application of radiotherapy and for the areola in some forms of breast reconstruction. Tattooing has also been used to convey medical information about the wearer (e.g., blood group, medical condition, etc.). Alzheimer's disease patients may be tattooed with their names, so they may be easily identified if they go missing. Additionally, tattoos are used in skin tones to cover vitiligo, a skin pigmentation disorder.

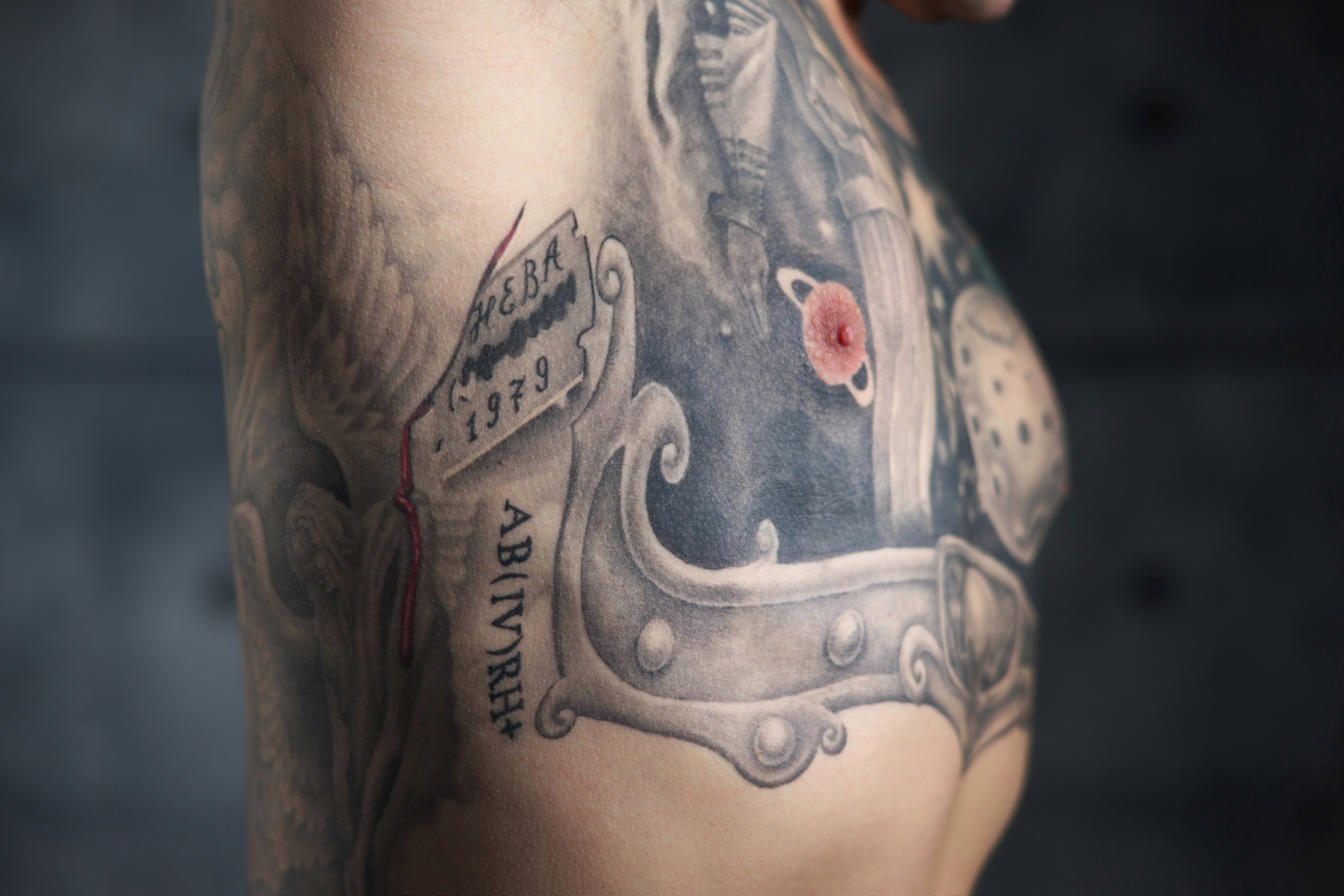
Medical tattoo: blood type

SS blood group tattoos (German: Blutgruppentätowierung) were worn by members of the Waffen-SS in Nazi Germany during World War II to identify the individual's blood type. After the war, the tattoo was taken to be prima facie, if not perfect, evidence of being part of the Waffen-SS, leading to potential arrest and prosecution. This led a number of ex-Waffen-SS to shoot themselves through the arm with a gun, removing the tattoo and leaving scars like the ones resulting from pox inoculation, making the removal less obvious.

Tattoos were probably also used in ancient medicine as part of the treatment of the patient. In 1898, medical doctor Daniel Fouquet wrote about "medical tattooing" practices in Ancient Egypt based on female mummies at the Deir el-Bahari site.

Ötzi the iceman had a total of 61 tattoos, which may have been a form of acupuncture used to relieve pain. Radiological examination of Ötzi's bones showed "age-conditioned or strain-induced degeneration" corresponding to many tattooed areas, including osteochondrosis and slight spondylosis in the lumbar spine and wear-and-tear degeneration in the knee and especially in the ankle joints. If so, this is at least 2,000 years before acupuncture's previously known earliest use in China (c. 100 BC).

Some women in the US and UK who have undergone mastectomy and breast reconstruction choose to get realistic tattoos of nipples. Others choose to get decorative cover-up tattoos over mastectomy scars instead of reconstruction.

== History ==
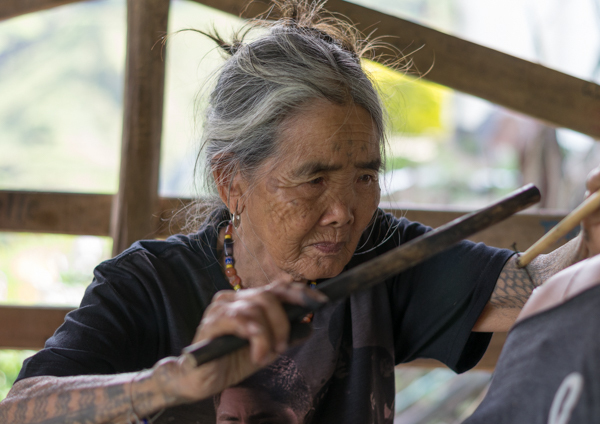
Whang-od, the last mambabatok (traditional Kalinga tattooist) of the Kalinga in the Philippines, performing a traditional batek tattoo

Preserved tattoos on ancient mummified human remains reveal that tattooing has been practiced throughout the world for thousands of years. In 2015, scientific re-assessment of the age of the two oldest known tattooed mummies identified Ötzi as the oldest example then known. This body, with 61 tattoos, was found embedded in glacial ice in the Alps, and was dated to 3250 BC. In 2018, the oldest figurative tattoos in the world were discovered on two mummies from Egypt which are dated between 3351 and 3017 BC.

Ancient tattooing was most widely practiced among the Austronesian people. It was one of the early technologies developed by the Proto-Austronesians in Taiwan and coastal South China prior to at least 1500 BC, before the Austronesian expansion into the islands of the Indo-Pacific. It may have originally been associated with headhunting. Tattooing traditions, including facial tattooing, can be found among all Austronesian subgroups, including Taiwanese indigenous peoples, Islander Southeast Asians, Micronesians, Polynesians, and the Malagasy people. Austronesians used the characteristic hafted skin-puncturing technique, using a small mallet and a piercing implement made from Citrus thorns, fish bone, bone, and oyster shells.

Ancient tattooing traditions have also been documented among Papuans and Melanesians, with their use of distinctive obsidian skin piercers. Some archeological sites with these implements are associated with the Austronesian migration into Papua New Guinea and Melanesia. But other sites are older than the Austronesian expansion, being dated to around 1650 to 2000 BC, suggesting that there was a preexisting tattooing tradition in the region.

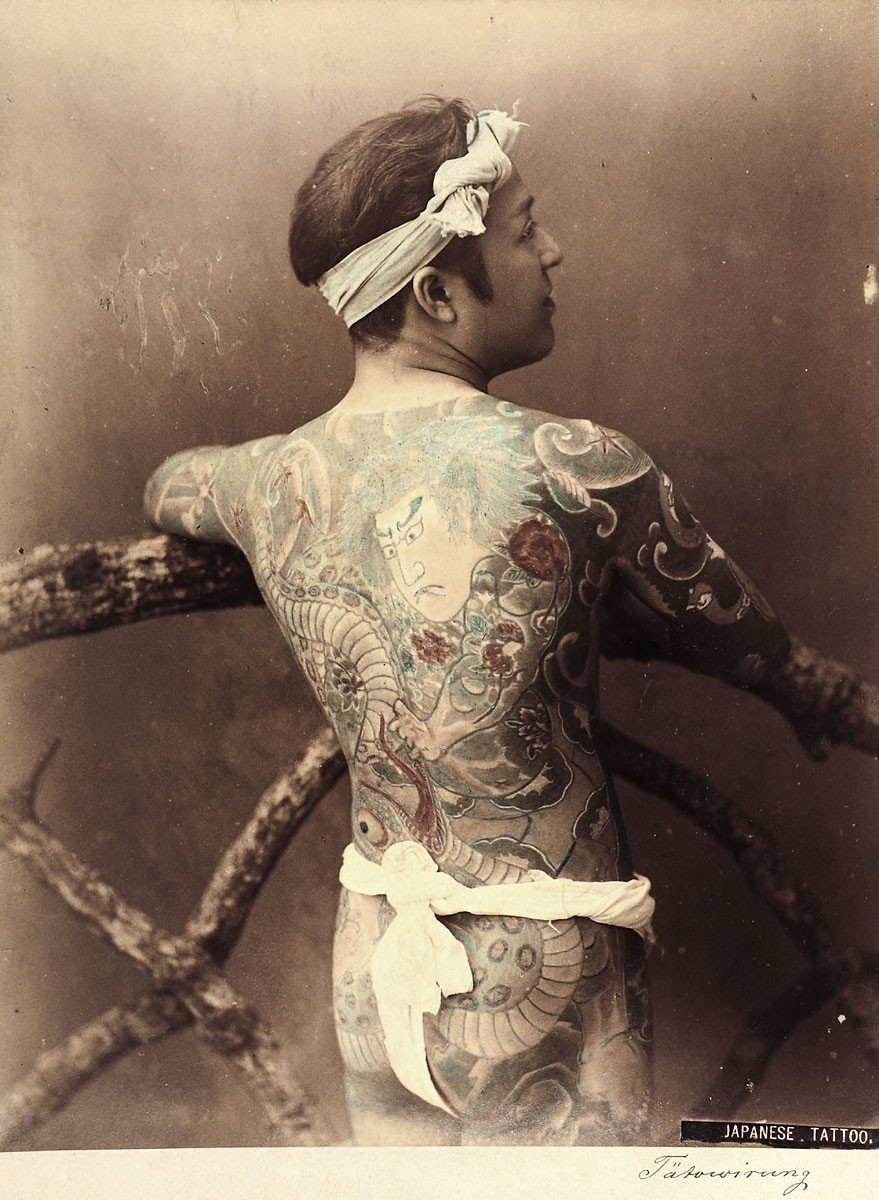
Photograph of a Japanese man with an irezumi tattoo, c. 1880

Among other ethnolinguistic groups, tattooing was also practiced among the Ainu people of Japan; some Austroasians of Indochina; Berber women of Tamazgha (North Africa); the Yoruba, Fulani and Hausa people of Nigeria; the Makonde people of Kenya, Tanzania and Mozambique; Native Americans of the Pre-Columbian Americas; people of Rapa Nui; Picts of Iron Age Britain; and Paleo-Balkan peoples (Illyrians and Thracians, as well as Daunians in Apulia), a tradition that has been preserved in the western Balkans by Albanians (Albanian traditional tattooing), Catholics in Bosnia and Herzegovina (Sicanje), and women of some Vlach communities.

=== Egypt and Sudan ===
The earliest figural tattoos were identified on the naturally mummified human remains of a male buried within a shallow grave from Gebelein in upper Egypt, and radiocarbon dated to around 3351-3017 BC. The male mummy, named the "Gebelein man", had two overlapping tattoos on his right forearm, one depicting a bovine, and the other depicting another horned animal, perhaps a barbary sheep or another bovine. The Gebelein man was approximately 18–21 years of age when he died, suggesting that he received his tattoos at an early age.

The cultures of Ancient Egypt and Ancient Nubia, located in modern-day Sudan, while diverse and multifaceted within their own rights, often have roots in a shared cultural heritage such as the tradition of tattooing. While the Gebelein man was buried in Egypt, most discoveries of tattooed individuals from this region are from Ancient Nubia. In Nubia, the earliest identified human remains with tattoos are dated to the C-Group period, which lasted from 2345 to 1500 BC and was contemporaneous with the First Intermediate period through the Second Intermediate period in Ancient Egypt. During this C-Group period, only women have been found with tattoos, suggesting that tattooing was gendered at this time. Tattoos of this period usually consist of dotted patterns and lines, and typically were located on the abdomen, chest, arms, or legs.

By 500 BC, there is evidence of tattooing on men in Ancient Nubia, typically on the hands or arms, and rarely on the face. There is also more evidence of figural tattooing around this period, typically found on female human remains. These figural tattoos encompassed a wide variety of images, such as abstract chains of "sss" or depictions of gods and goddesses. In Nubia, a female mummy from Aksha dated to the 4th century BC contains a tattoo of the Egyptian deity Bes on her thigh. Bes, a dwarfed god, is often associated with fertility and childbirth, and was a popular image tattooed onto women both in Egypt and Nubia, as seen in both iconographic examples, such as tomb paintings, and on human remains.

No ancient tattoo instruments or tools have been confidently identified at archaeological excavations in either Egypt or Sudan, due to the perishable nature of the tools and their possibility for misidentification. However, tattoos during this period were created with metal needles or awls, tools typically associated with the work of domestic women.

=== China ===
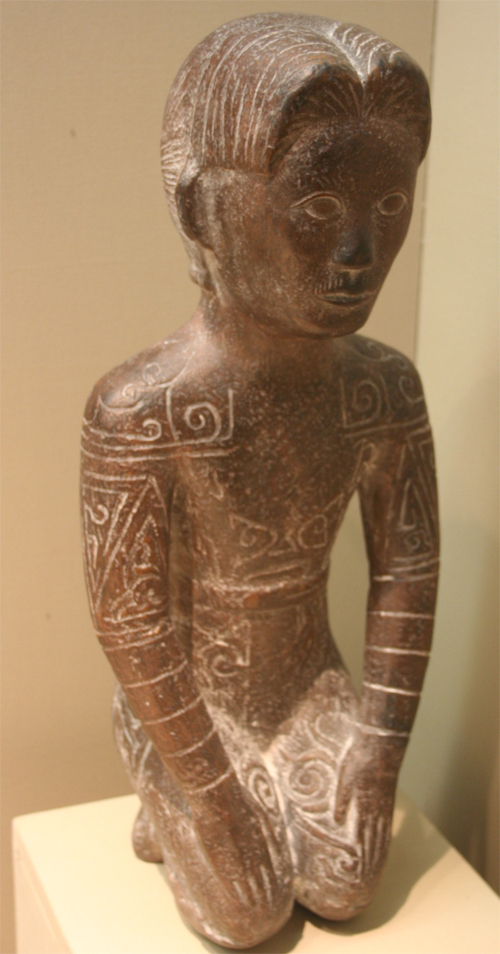
A Yue ("barbarian") statue of a tattooed man with short hair from the para-Austronesian cultures of southern China, from the Zhejiang Provincial Museum

Cemeteries throughout the Tarim Basin (Xinjiang of western China) including the sites of Qäwrighul, Yanghai, Shengjindian, Zaghunluq, and Qizilchoqa have revealed several tattooed mummies with Western Asian/Indo-European physical traits and cultural materials. These date from between 2100 and 550 BC.

In ancient China, tattoos were considered a barbaric practice associated with the Yue peoples of southeastern and southern China. Tattoos were often referred to in literature depicting bandits and folk heroes. It was common practice to tattoo characters such as 囚 ("Prisoner") on convicted criminals' faces by the ancient Chinese, both for identification or as punishment itself. Although relatively rare during most periods of Chinese history, slaves were also sometimes marked to display ownership.

However, tattoos seem to have remained a part of southern Chinese culture. Marco Polo wrote of Quanzhou, "Many come hither from Upper India to have their bodies painted with the needle in the way we have elsewhere described, there being many adepts at this craft in the city". At least three of the main characters – Lu Zhishen, Shi Jin (史進), and Yan Ching (燕青) – in the classic novel Water Margin are described as having tattoos covering nearly all of their bodies. Wu Song was sentenced to a facial tattoo describing his crime after killing Xi Menqing (西門慶) to avenge his brother.

=== Europe and Siberia ===
The earliest possible evidence for tattooing in Europe appears on ancient art from the Upper Paleolithic period as incised designs on the bodies of humanoid figurines. The Löwenmensch figurine from the Aurignacian culture dates to approximately 40,000 years ago and features a series of parallel lines on its left shoulder. The ivory Venus of Hohle Fels, which dates to between 35,000 and 40,000 years ago also exhibits incised lines down both arms, as well as across the torso and chest.

The oldest and most famous direct proof of ancient European tattooing appears on the body of Ötzi the Iceman, dating from the late 4th millennium BC. The Thracians, who inhabited East Macedonia and southeast Bulgaria, viewed tattoos as signs of nobility and divinity. In Book 5 (of The Histories), Herodotus remarks that the Thracians believed "the possession of tattoos held to be a sign of breeding, while the lack of them was a mark of low birth". The ancient Greeks and Romans used tattooing to penalize slaves, criminals, and prisoners of war. While known, decorative tattooing was looked down upon and religious tattooing was mainly practiced in Egypt and Syria. The Picts may have been tattooed (or scarified) with elaborate, war-inspired black or dark blue woad (or possibly copper for the blue tone) designs. Julius Caesar described these tattoos in Book V of his Gallic Wars (54 BCE). Nevertheless, these may have been painted markings rather than tattoos.

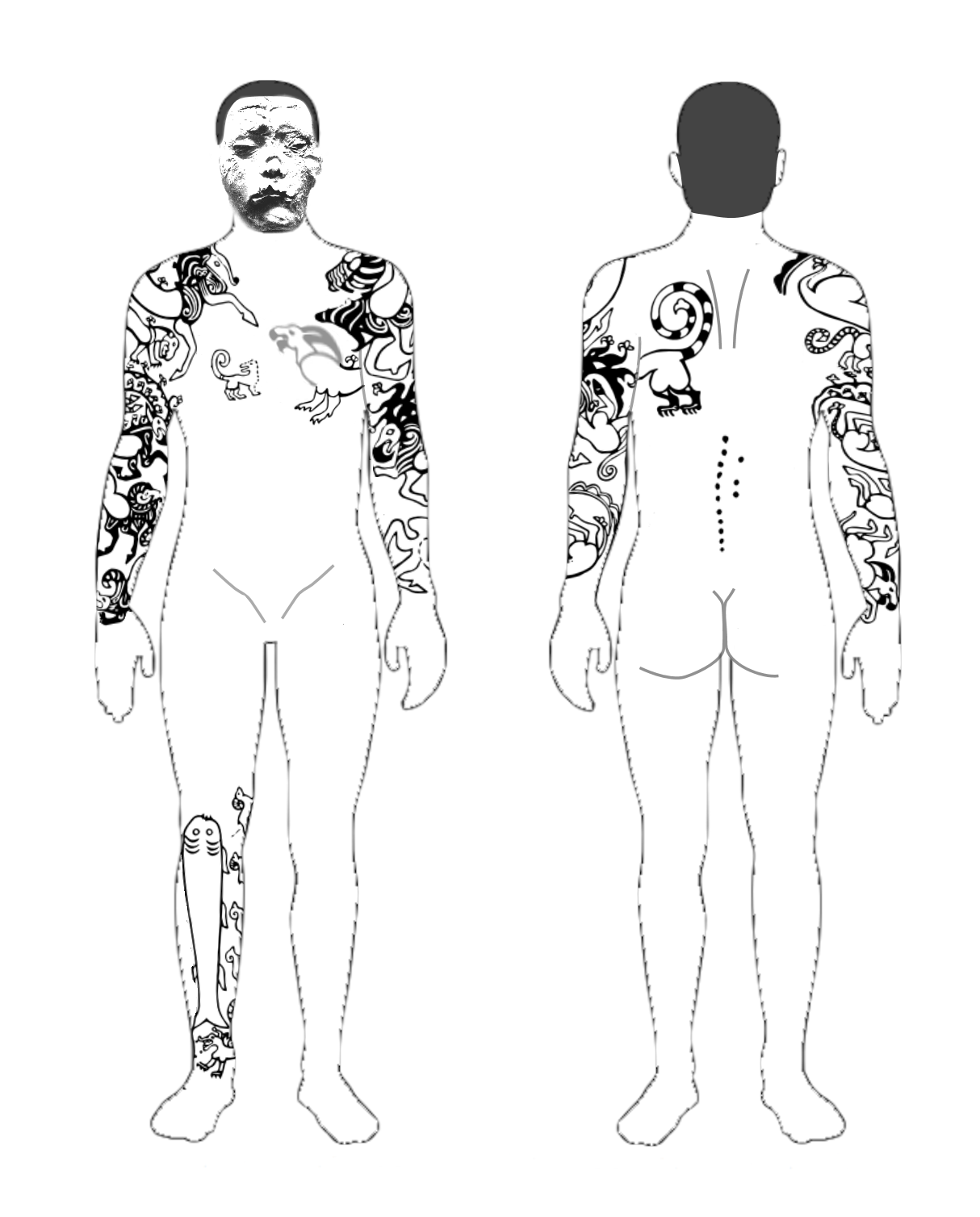
Tattoos of a Scythian man from Pazyryk, preserved in Siberian permafrost from the 5th-4th century BC

Scythians from Central Asia and southern Siberia practiced extensive tattooing, evident from mummified remains (like the famous Siberian Ice Princess) in the Pazyryk culture (Saka/Scythian) of the Altai region. In his encounter with a group of pagan Scandinavian Rus' merchants in the early 10th century, Ahmad ibn Fadlan describes what he witnesses among them, including their appearance. He notes that the Rus' were heavily tattooed: "From the tips of his toes to his neck, each man is tattooed in dark green with designs, and so forth." Raised in the aftermath of the Norman conquest of England, William of Malmesbury describes in his Gesta Regum Anglorum that the Anglo-Saxons were tattooed upon the arrival of the Normans (..."arms covered with golden bracelets, tattooed with coloured patterns ...").

The practice of exhibiting tattooed Indigenous peoples in Western Europe began during the Age of Discovery, with documented instances involving Inuit as early as the mid-16th century and a Filipino man from the island of Mindanao in the late 17th century. These individuals were typically abducted and displayed as "curiosities" for commercial exploitation. One Inuk, a tattooed woman (kakiniit) from Baffin Island, was illustrated by the English cartographer John White.

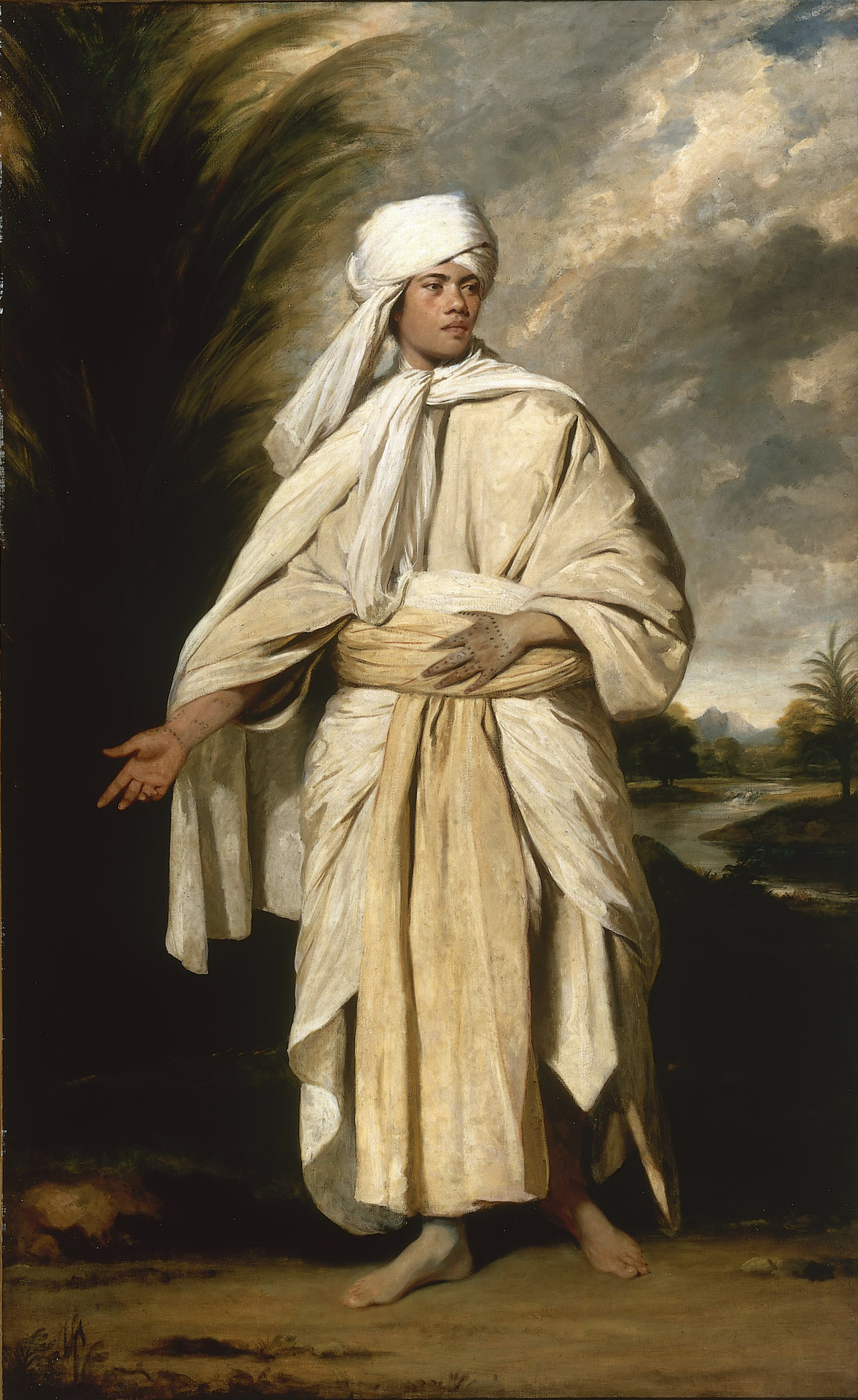
A portrait of Omai, a tattooed Raiatean man brought back to Europe by Captain James Cook

It is commonly held that the modern popularity of tattooing stems from Captain James Cook's three voyages to the South Pacific in the late 18th century. Certainly, Cook's voyages and the dissemination of the texts and images from them brought more awareness about tattooing (and, as noted above, imported the word "tattow" into Western languages). On Cook's first voyage in 1768, his science officer and expedition botanist, Sir Joseph Banks, as well as artist Sydney Parkinson and many others of the crew, returned to England with a keen interest in tattoos with Banks writing about them extensively and Parkinson is believed to have gotten a tattoo himself in Tahiti. Banks was a highly regarded member of the English aristocracy who had acquired his position with Cook by co-financing the expedition with ten thousand pounds, a very large sum at the time. In turn, Cook brought back with him a tattooed Raiatean man, Omai, whom he presented to King George and the English Court. On subsequent voyages other crew members, from officers, such as American John Ledyard, to ordinary seamen, were tattooed.

The first documented professional tattooist in Britain was Sutherland Macdonald, who operated out of a salon in London beginning in 1894. In Britain, tattooing was still largely associated with sailors and the lower or even criminal class, but by the 1870s had become fashionable among some members of the upper classes, including royalty, and in its upmarket form it could be an expensive and sometimes painful process. A marked class division on the acceptability of the practice continued for some time in Britain.

=== North America ===
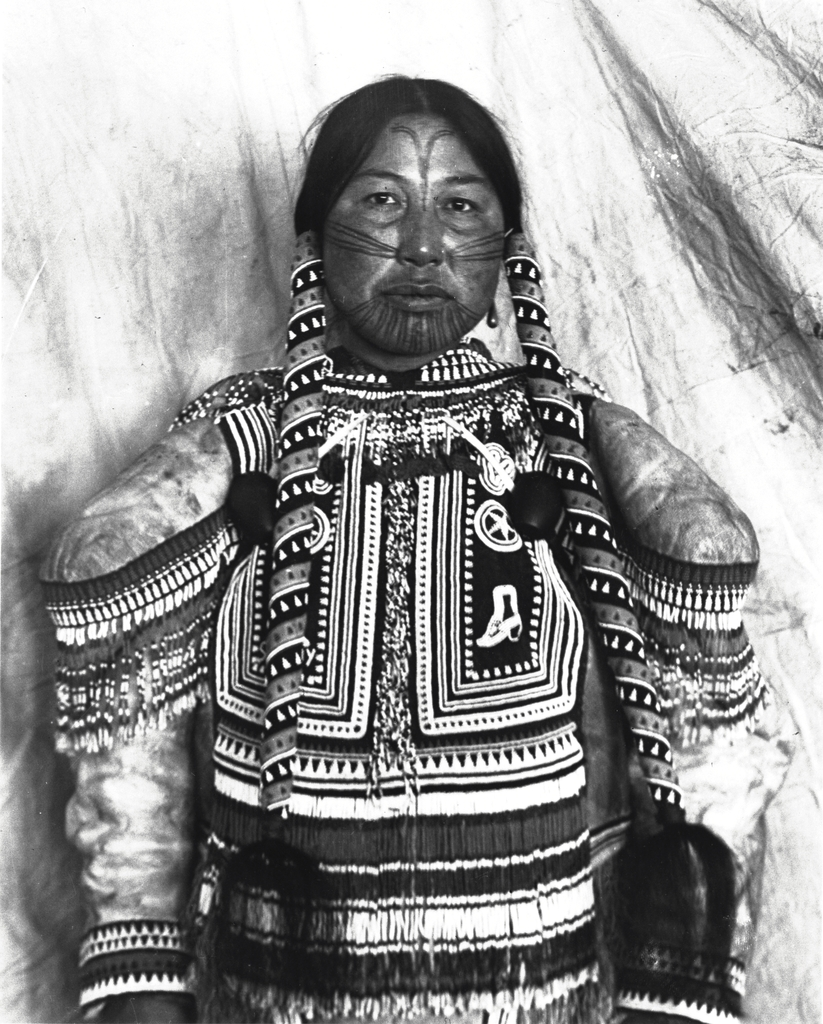
Tattooed Aivilingmiut (an Inuit subgroup) woman at Cape Fullerton, Canada, showing her kakiniit, photograph by Albert Peter Low, c. 1903

Many Indigenous peoples of North America practice tattooing. European explorers and traders who met Native Americans noticed these tattoos and wrote about them, and a few Europeans chose to be tattooed by Native Americans. See history of tattooing in North America.

By the time of the American Revolution, tattoos were already common among American sailors (see sailor tattoos). Tattoos were listed in protection papers, an identity certificate issued to prevent impressment into the British Royal Navy. Because protection papers were proof of American citizenship, Black sailors used them to show that they were freemen.

The first recorded professional tattoo shop in the U.S. was established in the early 1870s by a German immigrant, Martin Hildebrandt. He had served as a Union soldier in the Civil War and tattooed many other soldiers.

Soon after the Civil War, tattoos became fashionable among upper-class young adults. This trend lasted until the beginning of World War I. The invention of the electric tattoo machine caused popularity of tattoos among the wealthy to drop off. The machine made the tattooing procedure both much easier and cheaper, thus, eliminating the status symbol tattoos previously held, as they were now affordable for all socioeconomic classes. The status symbol of a tattoo shifted from a representation of wealth to a mark typically seen on rebels and criminals. Despite this change, tattoos remained popular among military servicemen, a tradition that continues today.

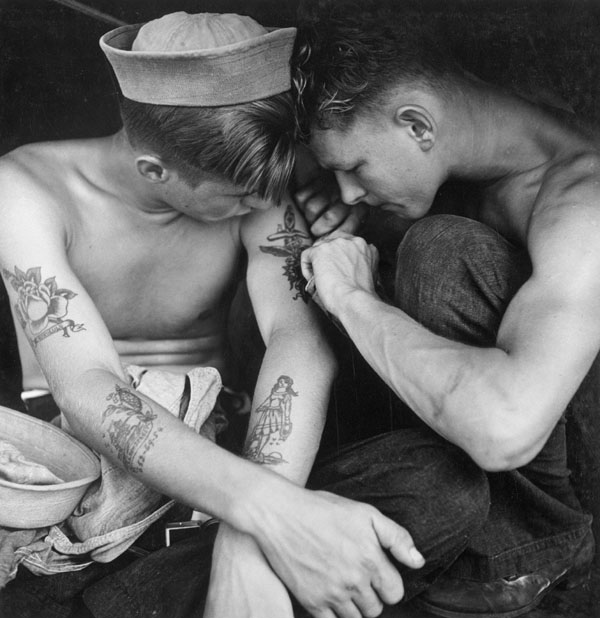
Sailor being tattooed by a fellow sailor aboard USS New Jersey in 1944

The passage of the Social Security Act in 1935 would also mark a notable boom for the tattoo industry, with numerous Americans hoping to memorize their social security numbers through tattoos. Tattooing was illegal in parts of the country until the early 1960s and 70s. It was illegal in New York City from 1961 to 1997 and illegal throughout various states like Oklahoma, Massachusetts, North Carolina. When it was not illegal statewide, certain cities banned it such as Newark, NJ and Kansas City, MO. In some locations, bans were not lifted until the 2000s.

In 1975, there were only 40 tattoo artists in the U.S.; in 1980, there were more than 5,000 self-proclaimed tattoo artists, appearing in response to sudden demand.

Many studies have been done of the tattooed population and society's view of tattoos. In June 2006, the Journal of the American Academy of Dermatology published the results of a telephone survey of 2004: it found that 36% of Americans ages 18–29, 24% of those 30–40, and 15% of those 41–51 had a tattoo. In September 2006, the Pew Research Center conducted a telephone survey that found that 36% of Americans ages 18–25, 40% of those 26–40 and 10% of those 41–64 had a tattoo. They concluded that Generation X and Millennials express themselves through their appearance, and tattoos are a popular form of self-expression. In January 2008, a survey conducted online by Harris Interactive estimated that 14% of all adults in the United States have a tattoo, slightly down from 2003, when 16% had a tattoo. Among age groups, 9% of those ages 18–24, 32% of those 25–29, 25% of those 30–39 and 12% of those 40–49 have tattoos, as do 8% of those 50–64. Men are slightly more likely to have a tattoo than women.

Since the 1970s, tattoos have become a mainstream part of Western fashion, common both for men and women, and among all economic classes and to age groups from the later teen years to middle age. For many young Americans, the tattoo has taken on a decidedly different meaning than for previous generations. The tattoo has undergone "dramatic redefinition" and has shifted from a form of deviance to an acceptable form of expression. As of 1 November 2006, Oklahoma became the last state to legalize tattooing, having banned it since 1963.

=== Australia ===
Scarring was practised widely amongst the Indigenous peoples of Australia, now only really found in parts of Arnhem Land. Each "deliberately placed scar tells a story of pain, endurance, identity, status, beauty, courage, sorrow or grief."

Barramoyokjarlukkugarr walang bolhminy now bolitj. They put it on the wound and then it comes up as an adornment scar. (Bob Burruwal, Rembarrnga, Arnhem Land)

The European history of the use of tattoo in Australia is that branding was used by European authorities for marking criminals throughout the seventeenth and eighteenth centuries. The practice was also used by British authorities to mark army deserters and military personnel court-martialed in Australia. In nineteenth century Australia tattoos were generally the result of personal rather than official decisions but British authorities started to record tattoos along with scars and other bodily markings to describe and manage convicts assigned for transportation. The practice of tattooing appears to have been a largely non-commercial enterprise during the convict period in Australia. For example, James Ross in the Hobart Almanac of 1833 describes how the convicts on board ship commonly spent time tattooing themselves with gunpowder. Out of a study of 10,180 convict records that were transported to then Van Diemen's Land (now Tasmania) between 1823 and 1853 about 37% of all men and about 15% of all women arrived with tattoos, making Australia at the time the most heavily tattooed English-speaking country.

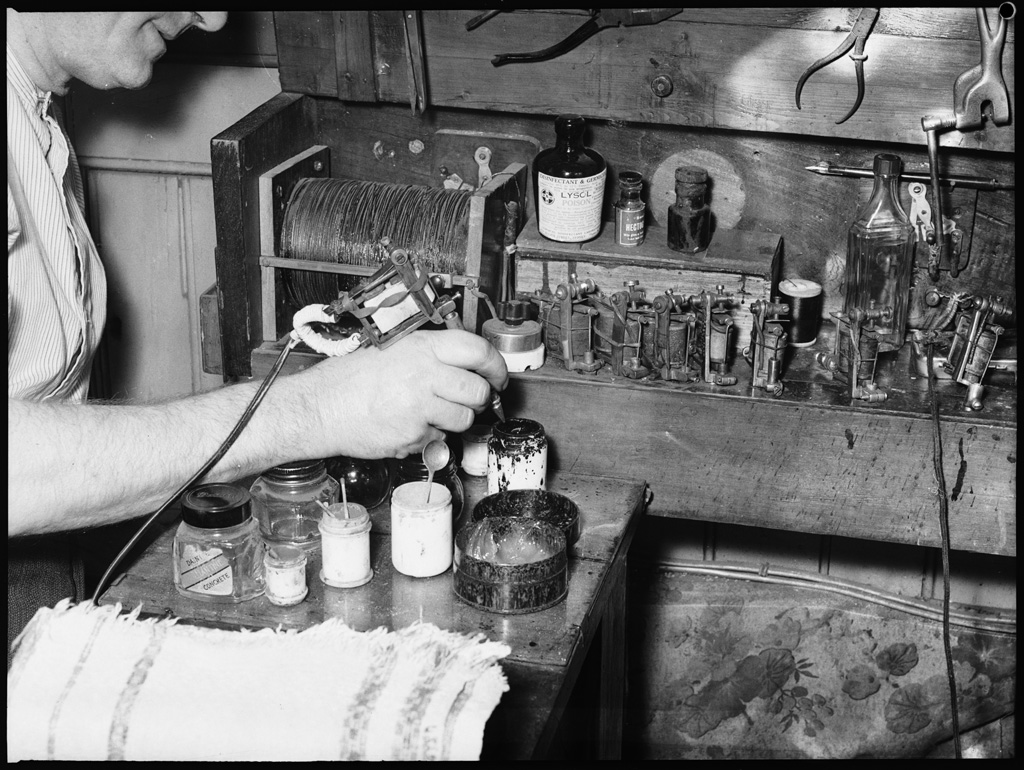
Fred Harris, Tattoo Studio, Sydney, 1937

By the beginning of the twentieth century, there were tattoo studios in Australia but they do not appear to have been numerous. For example, the Sydney tattoo studio of Fred Harris was touted as being the only tattoo studio in Sydney between 1916 and 1943. Tattoo designs often reflected the culture of the day and in 1923 Harris's small parlour experienced an increase in the number of women getting tattoos. Another popular trend was for women to have their legs tattooed so the designs could be seen through their stockings.

By 1937 Harris was one of Sydney's best-known tattoo artists and was inking around 2000 tattoos a year in his shop. Sailors provided most of the canvases for his work but among the more popular tattoos in 1938 were Australian flags and kangaroos for sailors of the visiting American Fleet.

In modern-day Australia, tattoos are common and widely accepted. A 2024 study determined that there were 1,860 tattoo businesses in Australia. There are tattoo conventions held in major cities each year. The Southern Cross motif from the Australian flag is a popular but controversial tattoo.

=== Latin America ===
Of the three best-known Pre-Columbian civilizations in the Americas, the Mayas and the Aztecs of Central America were known to wear tattoos while the Incas of South America were not. However, there is evidence that the Chimu people who preceded the Incas did wear tattoos for magic and medical purposes. The Chancay culture of coastal Peru had tattoos around 1250 A.D. which were studied with lasers by researchers at the Chinese University of Hong Kong. The diverse tribes of the Amazon have also worn tattoos for millennia and continue to do so to this day, including facial tattoos and notably, the people of the Xingu River in the North of Brazil and the Putumayo River between Peru, Brazil, and Colombia

=== New Zealand ===
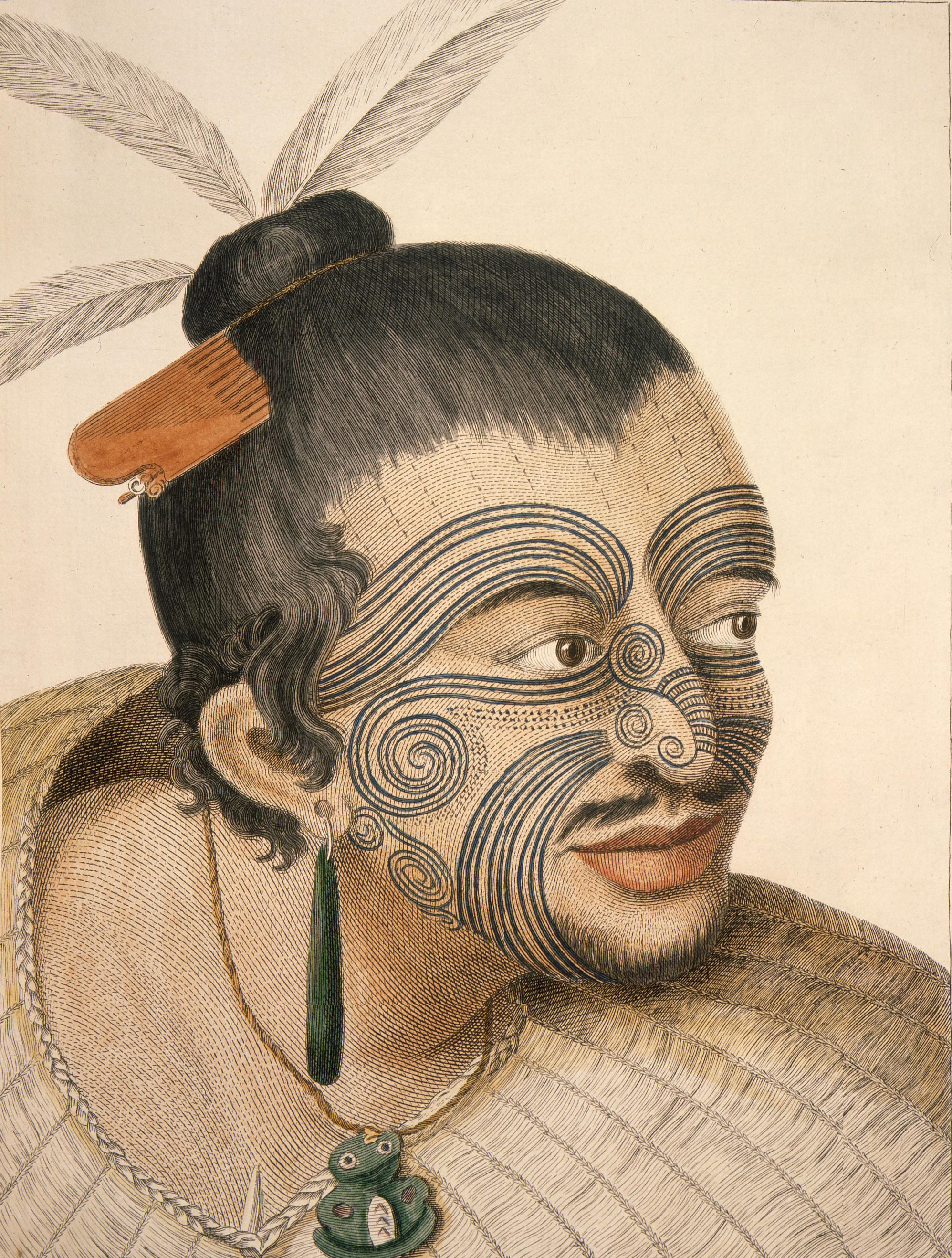
A Māori chief with tattoos (moko) seen by Cook and his crew (drawn by Sydney Parkinson 1769), engraved for A Journal of a Voyage to the South Seas by Thomas Chambers

The Māori people of New Zealand have historically practiced tattooing. Amongst these are facial designs worn to indicate lineage, social position, and status within the iwi (tribe) called tā moko. The tattoo art was a sacred marker of identity among the Māori and also referred to as a vehicle for storing one's tapu, or spiritual being, in the afterlife. One practice was after death to preserve the skin-covered skull known as Toi moko or mokomokai. In the period of early contact between Māori and Europeans these heads were traded especially for firearms. Many of these are now being repatriated back to New Zealand led by the country's national museum, Te Papa. Tā moko experienced a revival in the 20th century and is still practiced today, often with contemporary tattooing methods such as tattoo guns.

=== Pakistan And Afghanistan ===
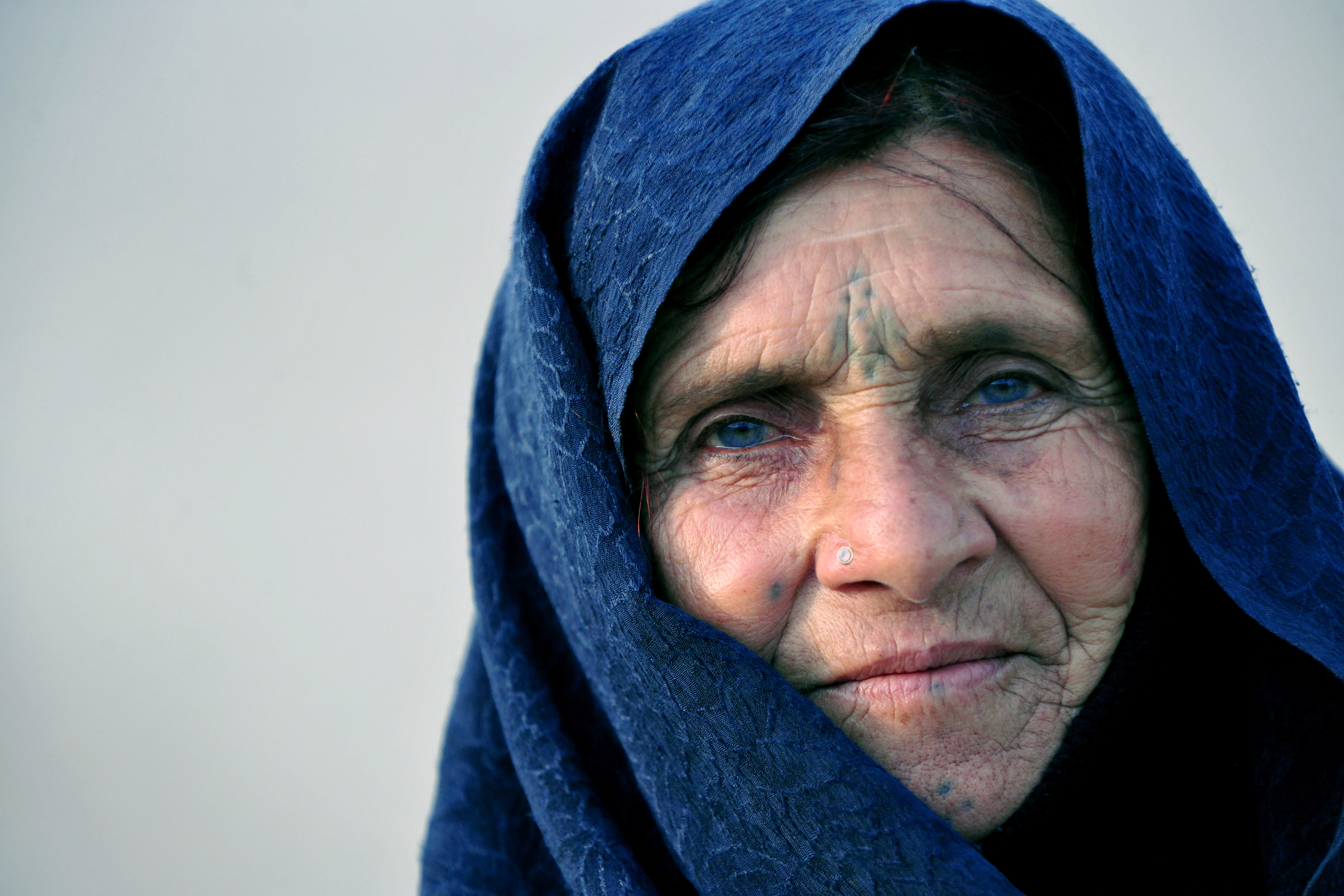
A Pashtun woman with traditional facial tattoos (Sheen Khāl) on her chin and cheeks. Public-domain image.

Facial tattooing among Pashtun women in Afghanistan and Pakistan is described in ethnographic and folkloric studies of the region. Commonly known as khāl or Sheen Khāl (“blue mark”), the practice involved placing small blue or green dots on the chin, forehead, cheeks, or between the eyebrows. These markings formed part of local aesthetic traditions and were typically applied using simple needle techniques and natural pigments by women within the community.

Scholars note that facial tattooing was historically more common in rural and tribal Pashtun communities, particularly among women, but declined significantly during the twentieth century. This decline is generally linked to social change, urbanisation, and changing religious attitudes toward tattooing, and the practice is now largely absent among younger generations.

=== India ===
Tattooing in India has a long history, practiced by various tribes and communities. The art of tattooing was traditionally linked to cultural, social, and spiritual beliefs. In the northeastern states, such as Assam and Nagaland, tribal tattoos were symbolic of protection, rites of passage, and spiritual identity. The Gond people of central India and Warli tribe of Maharashtra also practiced tattooing, which represented their cultural heritage and connection to nature.

In Rajasthan, tattoos were often considered to protect the wearer from evil spirits and bring good fortune. Among the Mishing people of Assam, tattoos were seen as indicators of maturity and social standing. The tradition of tattooing evolved over time from a ritualistic and protective art form to an expression of personal identity and individuality.

Binds in Uttar Pradesh have used tattoos to signify the marital status of a woman, especially in remote rural areas. In the past, girls would get tattooed as soon as they started menstruating, which signaled to the family that it was time to begin searching for a groom.

In Bihar state of India, traditional tattoos are quite common. They are referred to as 'Godna' locally, and local flora and fauna are recurring motifs for tattoos.

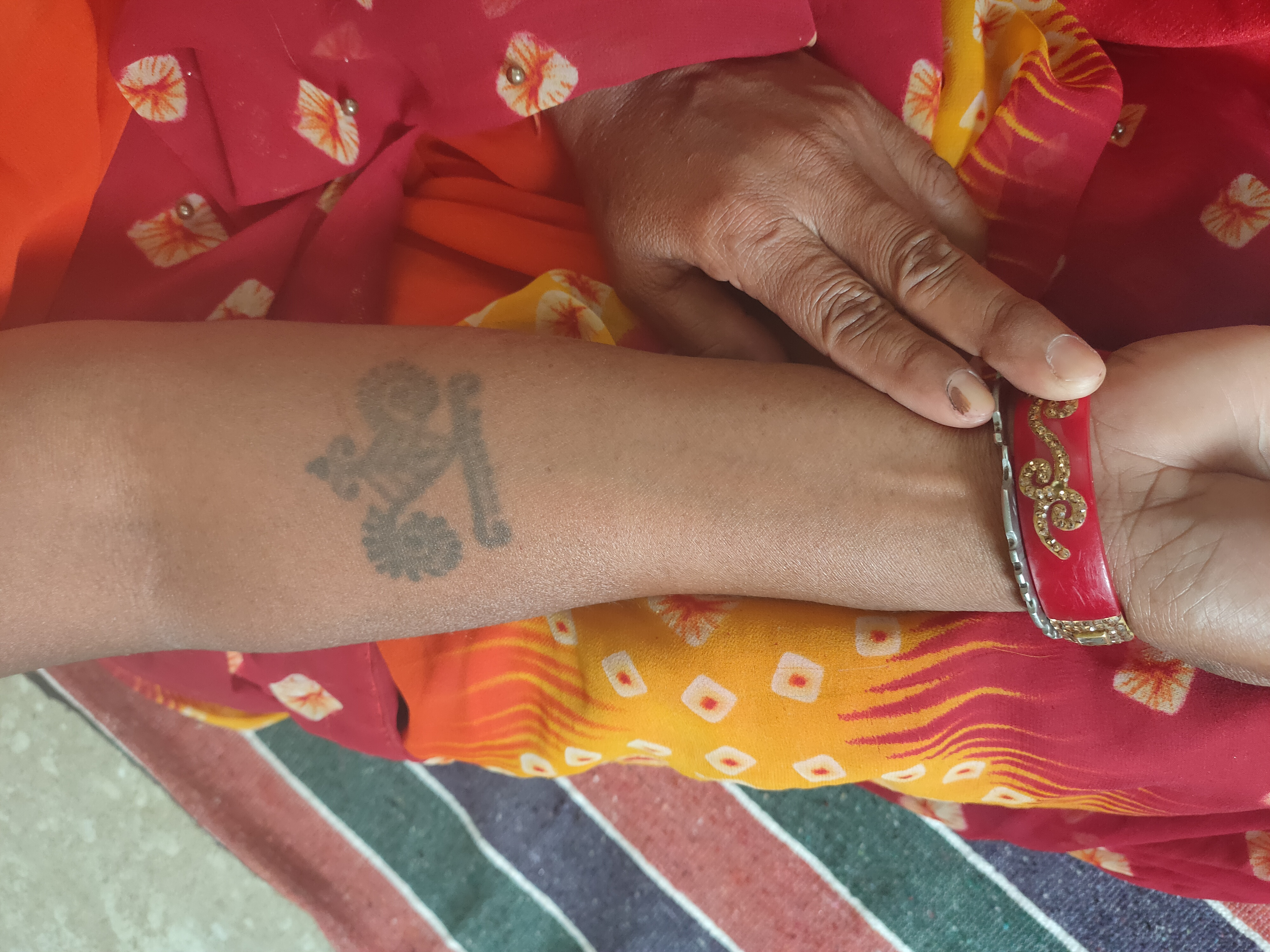
Resident of Naiyyasi, Bihar shows her traditional tattoo

Tattoos are considered as a beautifying ritual among women from Banka and Munger district of Bihar, as evidenced in folk songs about tattooing.

Folk songs about tattoos are popular during wedding ceremonies of Bihar

In contemporary India, tattooing has become mainstream, particularly in urban areas, with many tattoo artists gaining international recognition. Tattoos are now a popular means of expressing personal stories, beliefs, and artistic style.

== Process ==
A short video of the making of a tattoo. The artist wears nitrile gloves to avoid causing infections while perforating the skin.

Tattooing involves the placement of pigment into the skin's dermis, the layer of dermal tissue underlying the epidermis. After initial injection, pigment is dispersed throughout a homogenized damaged layer down through the epidermis and upper dermis, in both of which the presence of foreign material activates the immune system's phagocytes to engulf the pigment particles. As healing proceeds, the damaged epidermis flakes away (eliminating surface pigment) while deeper in the skin granulation tissue forms, which is later converted to connective tissue by collagen growth. This mends the upper dermis, where pigment remains trapped within successive generations of macrophages, ultimately concentrating in a layer just below the dermis/epidermis boundary. Its presence there is stable, but in the long term (decades) the pigment tends to migrate deeper into the dermis, accounting for the degraded detail of old tattoos.

An alternative and painless method of permanent tattooing is to use patches covered by microneedles made of tattoo ink. The patch is pressed onto the skin the same way a temporary tattoo paper is applied to the body. The microneedles then dissolve, and after a few minutes the ink sinks into the skin.

=== Equipment ===
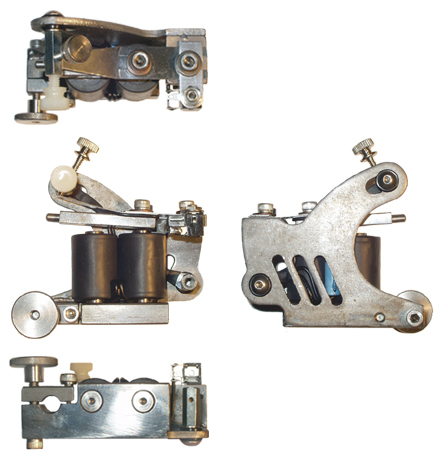
A two coil tattoo machine

Some tribal cultures traditionally created tattoos by cutting designs into the skin and rubbing the resulting wound with ink, ashes or other agents; some cultures continue this practice, which may be an adjunct to scarification. Some cultures create tattooed marks by hand-tapping the ink into the skin using sharpened sticks or animal bones (made into needles) with clay formed disks or, in modern times, actual needles.

The most common method of tattooing in modern times is the electric tattoo machine, which inserts ink into the skin via a single needle or a group of needles that are soldered onto a bar, which is attached to an oscillating unit. The unit rapidly and repeatedly drives the needles in and out of the skin, usually 80 to 150 times a second. The needles are single-use needles that come packaged individually, or manufactured by artists, on-demand, as groupings dictate on a per-piece basis.

In modern tattooing, an artist may use thermal stencil paper or hectograph ink/stencil paper to first place a printed design on the skin before applying a tattoo design.

=== Practice regulation and health risk certification ===
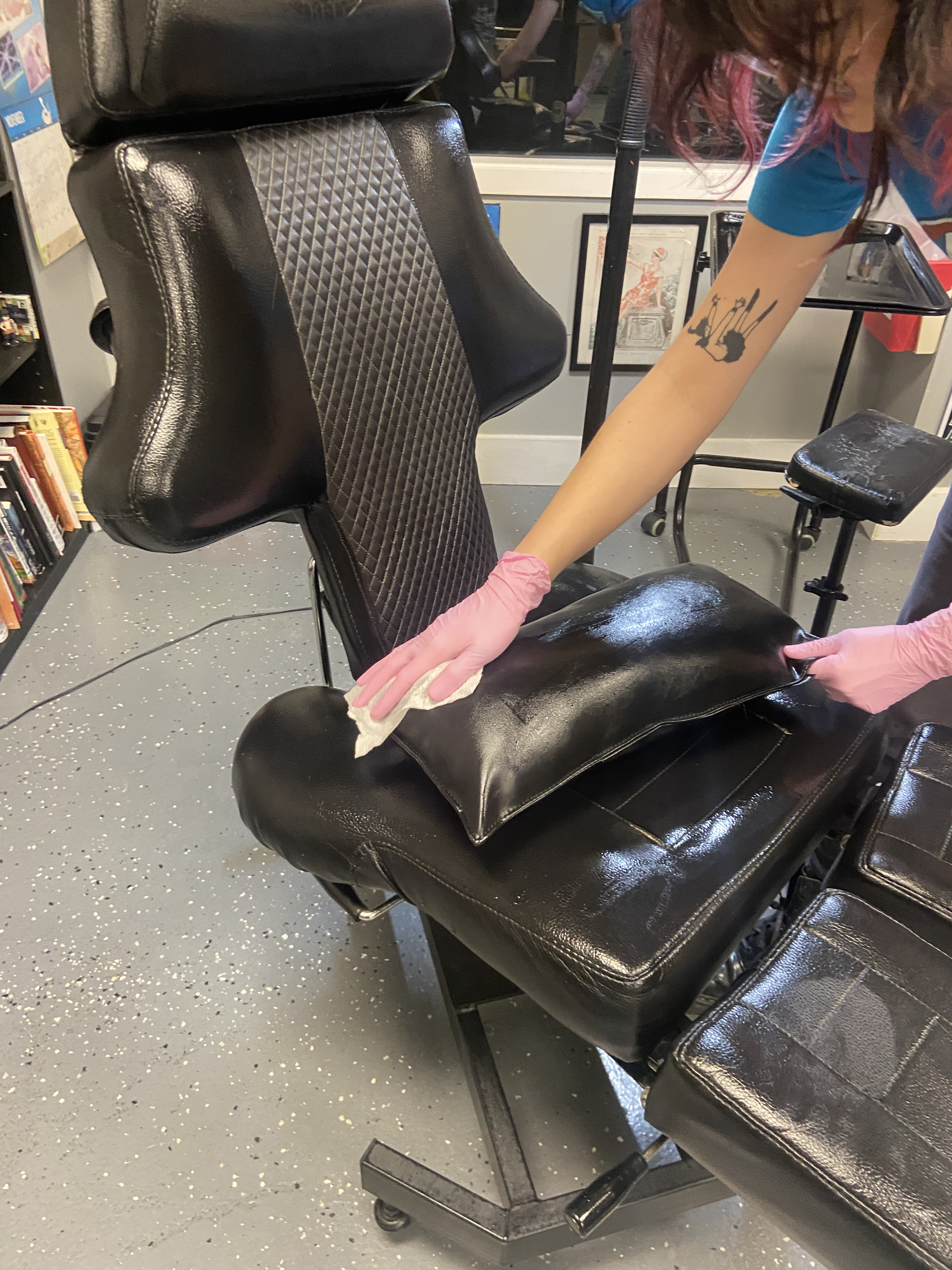
Cleaning work space with Madacide, a powerful hospital germicidal solution

Tattooing is regulated in many countries because of the associated health risks to client and practitioner, specifically local infections and virus transmission. Disposable plastic aprons and eye protection can be worn depending on the risk of blood or other secretions splashing into the eyes or clothing of the tattooist. Hand hygiene, assessment of risks and appropriate disposal of all sharp objects and materials contaminated with blood are crucial areas. The tattoo artist's hands must be washed, as must the area of the client's body that will be tattooed. Gloves must be worn at all times and the wound must be wiped frequently with a wet disposable towel of some kind. All equipment must be sterilized in a certified autoclave before and after every use. It is good practice to provide clients with a printed consent form that outlines risks and complications as well as instructions for after care.

== Associations ==
=== Historical associations ===
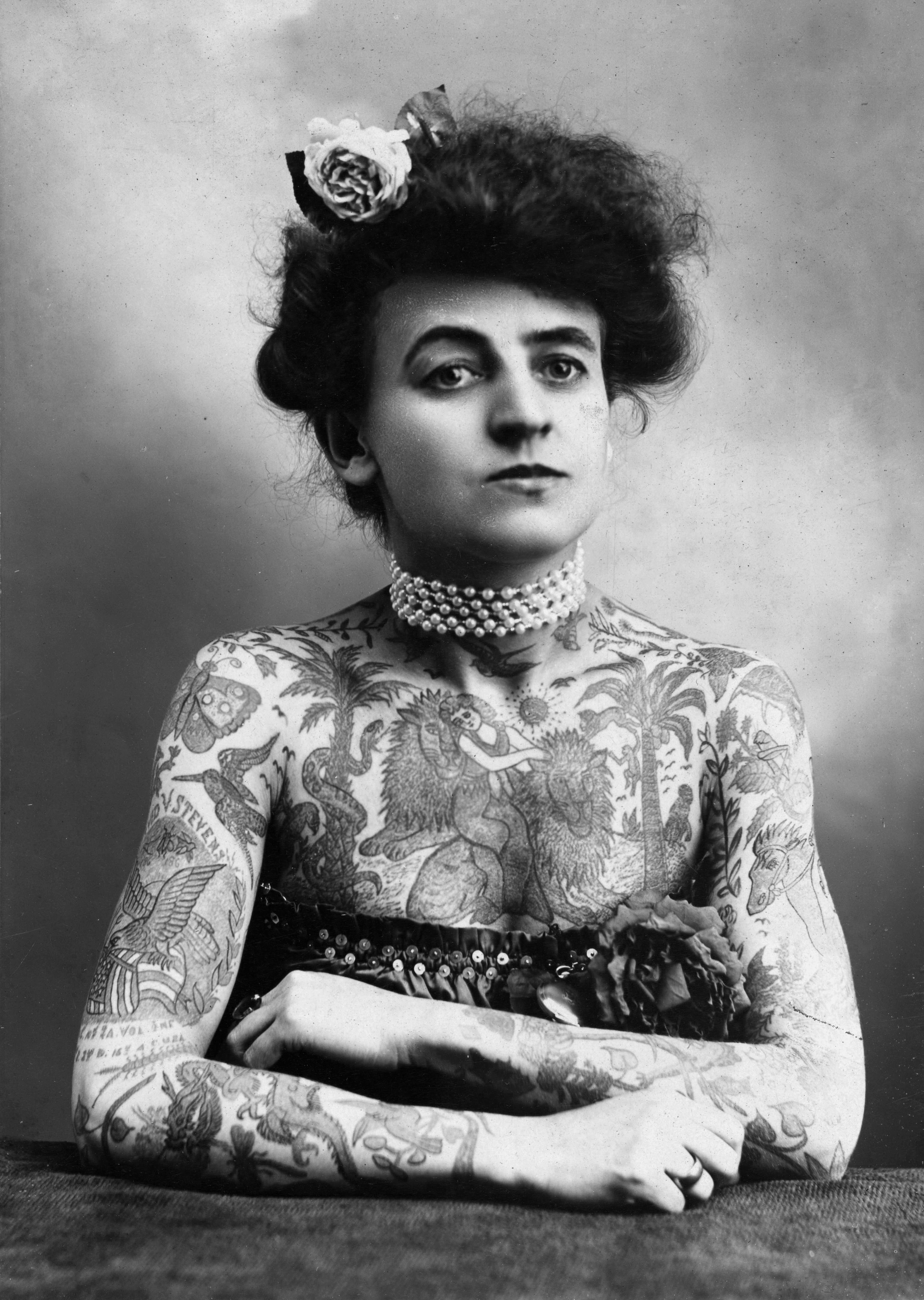
Mrs. M. Stevens Wagner with arms and chest covered in tattoos, 1907

Among Austronesian societies, tattoos had various functions. Among men, they were strongly linked to the widespread practice of head-hunting raids. In head-hunting societies, like the Ifugao and Dayak people, tattoos were records of how many heads the warriors had taken in battle, and were part of the initiation rites into adulthood. The number, design, and location of tattoos, therefore, were indicative of a warrior's status and prowess. They were also regarded as magical wards against various dangers like evil spirits and illnesses. Among the Visayans of the pre-colonial Philippines, tattoos were worn by the tumao nobility and the timawa warrior class as permanent records of their participation and conduct in maritime raids known as mangayaw. In Austronesian women, like the facial tattoos among the women of the Tayal and Māori people, they were indicators of status, skill, and beauty.

Tattoos were part of the ancient Wu culture of the Yangtze River Delta but had negative connotations in traditional Han culture in China. The Zhou refugees Wu Taibo and his brother Zhongyong were recorded cutting their hair and tattooing themselves to gain acceptance before founding the state of Wu, but Zhou and imperial Chinese culture tended to restrict tattooing as a punishment for marking criminals. The association of tattoos with criminals was transmitted from China to influence Japan. Today, tattoos remain generally disfavored in Chinese society.

Tattooing of criminals and slaves was commonplace in the Roman Empire. Catholic Croats of Bosnia, especially children and women, used Sicanje for protection against conversion to Islam during the Ottoman rule in the Balkans.

In the 19th century, released convicts from the U.S. and Australia, as well as British military deserters were identified by tattoos. Prisoners in Nazi concentration camps were tattooed with an identification number. Today, many prison inmates still tattoo themselves as an indication of time spent in prison.

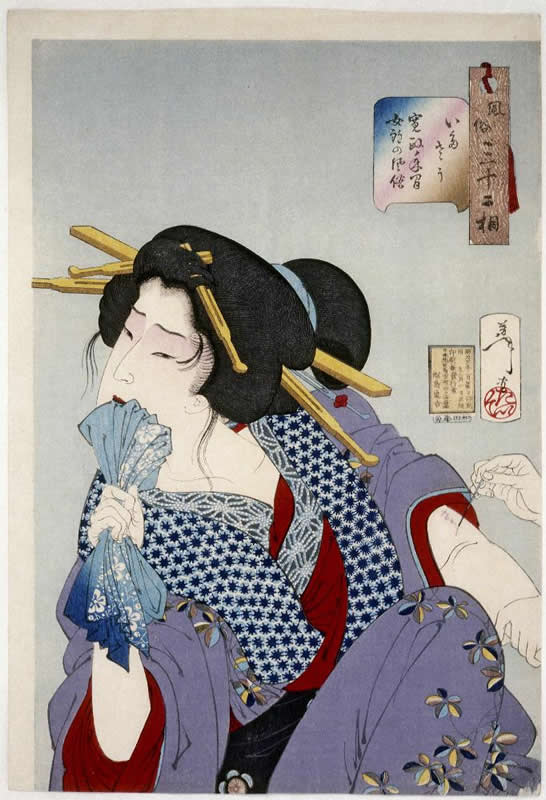
An 1888 Japanese woodblock print (ukiyo-e) of a prostitute biting her handkerchief in pain as her arm is tattooed. Based on historical practice, the tattoo is likely the name of her lover. printed by Tsukioka Yoshitoshi.

The Government of Meiji Japan had outlawed tattoos in the 19th century, a prohibition that stood for 70 years before being repealed in 1948. As of 6 June 2012, all new tattoos are forbidden for employees of the city of Osaka. Existing tattoos are required to be covered with proper clothing. The regulations were added to Osaka's ethical codes, and employees with tattoos were encouraged to have them removed. This was done because of the strong connection of tattoos with the yakuza, or Japanese organized crime, after an Osaka official in February 2012 threatened a schoolchild by showing his tattoo.

=== Modern associations ===
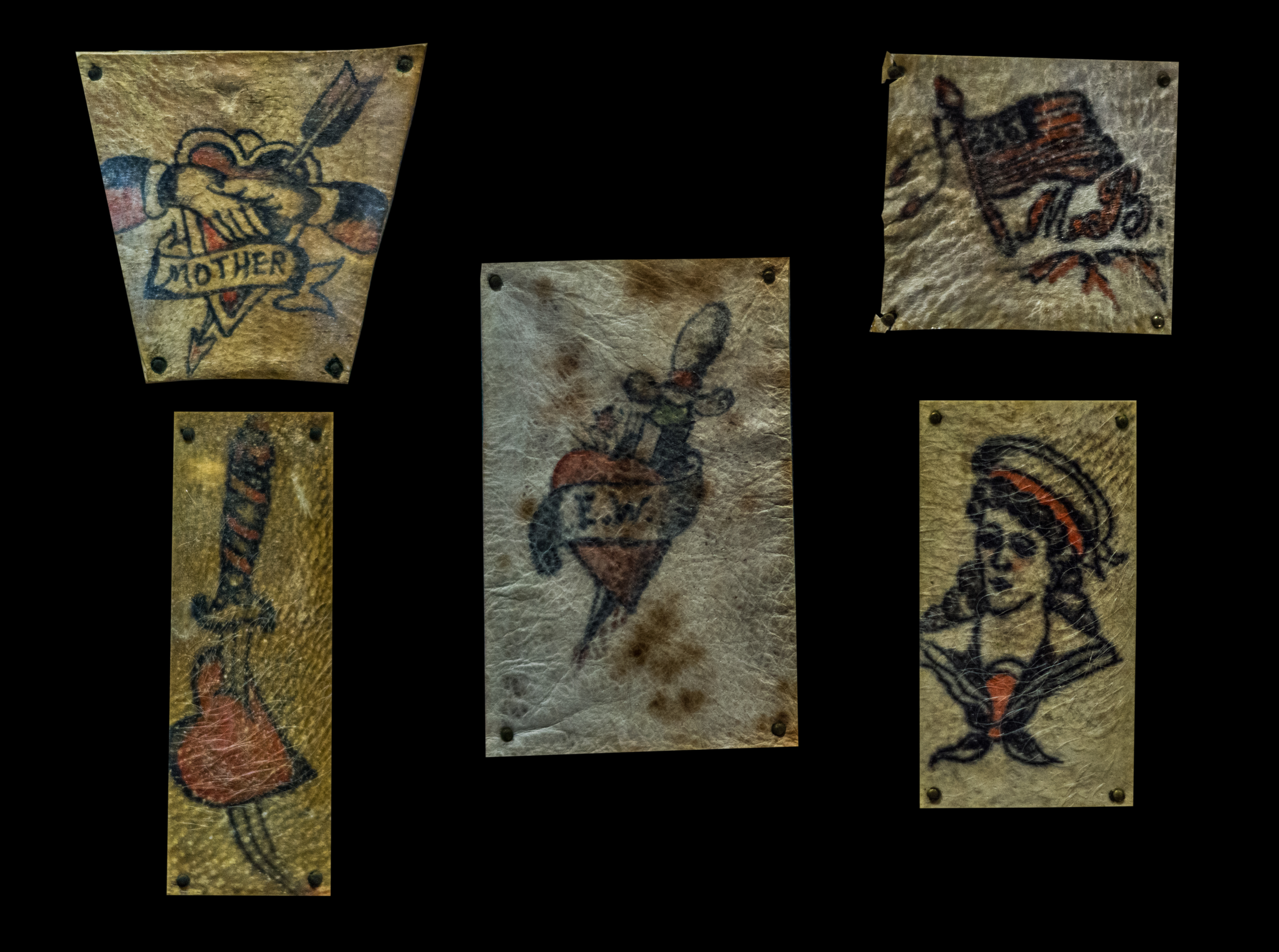
Preserved tattoos collected by Canadian forensic scientist Wilfrid Derome between 1914 and 1931

Tattoos are strongly associated with deviance, personality disorders and criminality. Although the general acceptance of tattoos is on the rise in Western society, they still carry a heavy stigma among certain social groups. Tattoos are generally considered an important part of the culture of the Russian mafia.

Current cultural understandings of tattoos in Europe and North America have been greatly influenced by long-standing stereotypes based on deviant social groups in the 19th and 20th centuries. Particularly in North America, tattoos have been associated with stereotypes, folklore and racism. Not until the 1960s and 1970s did people associate tattoos with such societal outcasts as bikers and prisoners. Today, in the United States many prisoners and criminal gangs use distinctive tattoos to indicate facts about their criminal behavior, prison sentences and organizational affiliation. A teardrop tattoo, for example, can be symbolic of murder, or each tear represents the death of a friend. At the same time, members of the U.S. military have an equally well-established and longstanding history of tattooing to indicate military units, battles, kills, etc., an association that remains widespread among older Americans. In Japan, tattoos are associated with yakuza criminal groups, but there are non-yakuza groups such as Fukushi Masaichi's tattoo association that sought to preserve the skins of dead Japanese who have extensive tattoos.

Tattooing is also common in the British Armed Forces. Depending on vocation, tattoos are accepted in a number of professions in America. Companies across many fields are increasingly focused on diversity and inclusion. Mainstream art galleries hold exhibitions of both conventional and custom tattoo designs, such as Beyond Skin, at the Museum of Croydon.

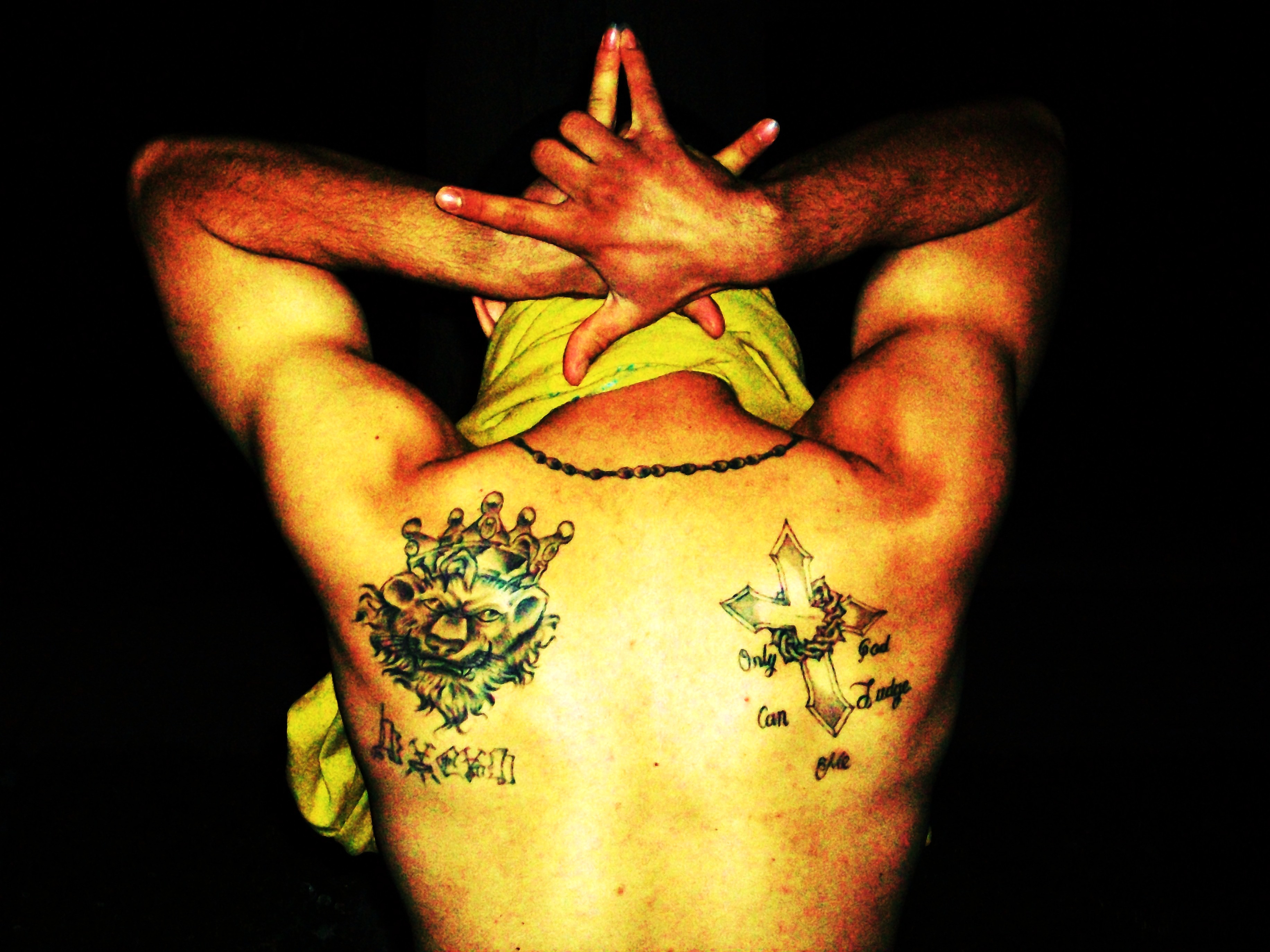
Latin Kings gang member showing his gang tattoo

In Britain, there is evidence of women with tattoos, concealed by their clothing, throughout the 20th century, and records of women tattooists such as Jessie Knight from the 1920s. A study of "at-risk" (as defined by school absenteeism and truancy) adolescent girls showed a positive correlation between body modification and negative feelings towards the body and low self-esteem; however, the study also demonstrated that a strong motive for body modification is the search for "self and attempts to attain mastery and control over the body in an age of increasing alienation". The prevalence of women in the tattoo industry in the 21st century, along with larger numbers of women bearing tattoos, appears to be changing negative perceptions.

In Covered in Ink by Beverly Yuen Thompson, she interviews heavily tattooed women in Washington, Miami, Orlando, Houston, Long Beach, and Seattle from 2007 to 2010 using participant observation and in-depth interviews of 70 women. Younger generations are typically more unbothered by heavily tattooed women, while older generation including the participants parents are more likely to look down on them, some even go to the extreme of disowning their children for getting tattoos. Typically how the family reacts is an indicator of their relationship in general. Reports were given that family members who were not accepting of tattoos wanted to scrub the images off, pour holy water on them or have them surgically removed. Families who were emotionally accepting of their family members were able to maintain close bonds after tattooing.

A 2025 United States opinion poll found 37% had favorable and 26% had unfavorable opinions towards tattoos.

== Health effects ==
The pain of tattooing can range from uncomfortable to excruciating, depending on the location of the tattoo on the body. With the use of modern numbing creams, pain may be eliminated or reduced. Fainting can occur during tattoo procedures, but is not considered very likely.

Because it requires breaking the immunologic barrier formed by the skin, tattooing carries health risks, including infection and allergic reactions. Modern tattooists reduce health risks by following universal precautions working with single-use items and sterilizing their equipment after each use. Many jurisdictions require that tattooists have blood-borne pathogen training such as that provided through the Red Cross and OSHA. As of 2024, the U.S. Centers for Disease Control and Prevention said there have been no known cases of HIV contracted from tattoos.

In amateur tattooing, such as the practice in prisons, there is an elevated risk of infection. Infections that can theoretically be transmitted by the use of unsterilized tattoo equipment or contaminated ink include surface infections of the skin, fungal infections, some forms of hepatitis, herpes simplex virus, staph, tetanus, and tuberculosis.

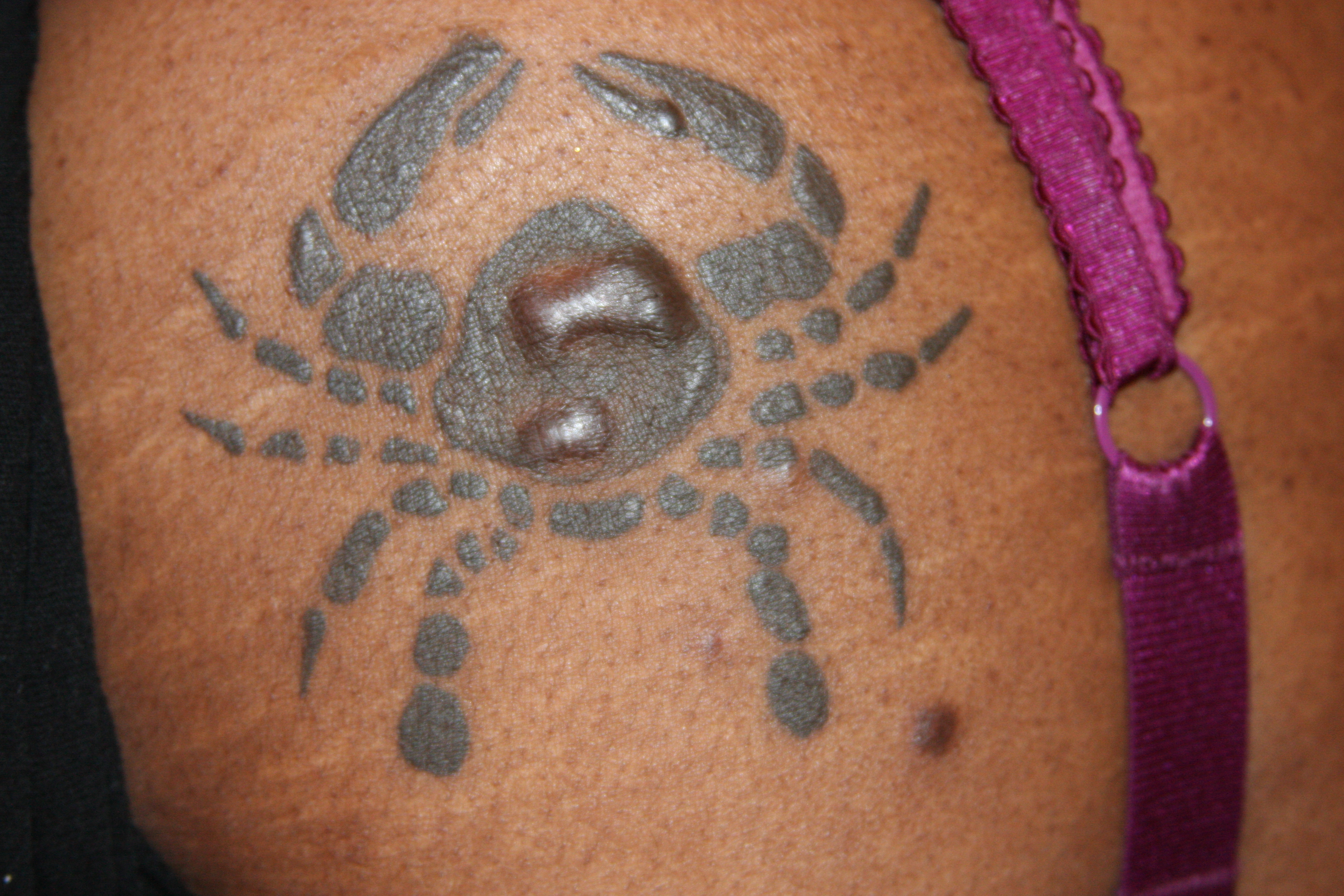
Keloid formation at the site of a tattoo

Tattoo inks have been described as "remarkably nonreactive histologically". However, cases of allergic reactions to tattoo inks, particularly certain colors, have been medically documented. This is sometimes due to the presence of nickel in an ink pigment, which triggers a common metal allergy. Occasionally, when a blood vessel is punctured during the tattooing procedure, a bruise/hematoma may appear. At the same time, a number of tattoo inks may contain hazardous substances, and a proposal has been submitted by the European Chemicals Agency (ECHA) to restrict the intentional use or concentration limit of approximately 4000 substances when contained in tattoo inks. According to a study by the European Union Observatory for Nanomaterials (EUON), a number of modern-day tattoo inks contain nanomaterials. These engender significant nanotoxicological concerns. In October 2024, an analysis in the European Union found that 9 out of 10 blue and green inks sold were not compliant with the Registration, Evaluation, Authorization and Restriction of Chemicals legislation.

Certain colours – red or similar colours such as purple, pink, and orange – tend to cause more problems and damage compared to other colours.

In 2017, researchers from the European Synchrotron Radiation Facility in France found that some of the chemicals in tattoo ink accumulate in the lymph nodes, obstructing their ability to fight infections. However, the authors noted that most tattooed individuals, including the donors analyzed, do not suffer from chronic inflammation.

Tattoo artists frequently recommend sun protection of skin to prevent tattoos from fading and to preserve skin integrity to make future tattooing easier.

A clear relationship between tattoos and cancer has not been established, but a few studies found that tattoos may be associated with an increased risk of malignant lymphoma and skin cancer. In a study of 158 pairs of twins, a tattoo palm-sized or larger resulted in triple the rate of lymphoma and double the rate of skin cancer compared to a twin that was not tattooed.

=== Tattooing and mental health ===
Choosing and receiving a meaningful tattoo can support a sense of personal autonomy, growth, and healing. Some mental health clinics and support groups offer free or low-cost cover-up tattoos to cover self-harm scars for those in recovery. Some breast cancer survivors choose decorative tattoos in place of reconstruction, with positive impacts on body image and a sense of personal agency. Memorial tattoos are a way for individuals to commemorate loved ones who have died or to mark significant life events.

== Removal ==
While tattoos are considered permanent, it is sometimes possible to remove them, fully or partially, with laser treatments. Typically, carbon based pigments, or iron-oxide-based pigments, as well as some colored inks can be removed more completely than inks of other colors. The expense and pain associated with removing tattoos are typically greater than the expense and pain associated with applying them. Methods other than laser tattoo removal methods include dermabrasion, salabrasion (scrubbing the skin with salt), reduction techniques, cryosurgery and excision—which is sometimes still used along with skin grafts for larger tattoos. These older methods, however, have been nearly completely replaced by laser removal treatment options.

Pew Research found that about 24% of Americans with tattoos regret at least one of them. A survey of tattooed people in India revealed that about 26% regretted their tattoos. A survey by a dermatology clinic also tracked significant regret.

Removal of tattoos was associated with a three times increase in lymphoma than untattooed persons. This may be due to the laser fragmenting tattoo ink molecules making them more reactive and potentially toxic; they then are picked up by the lymphatic system.

== Temporary tattoos ==
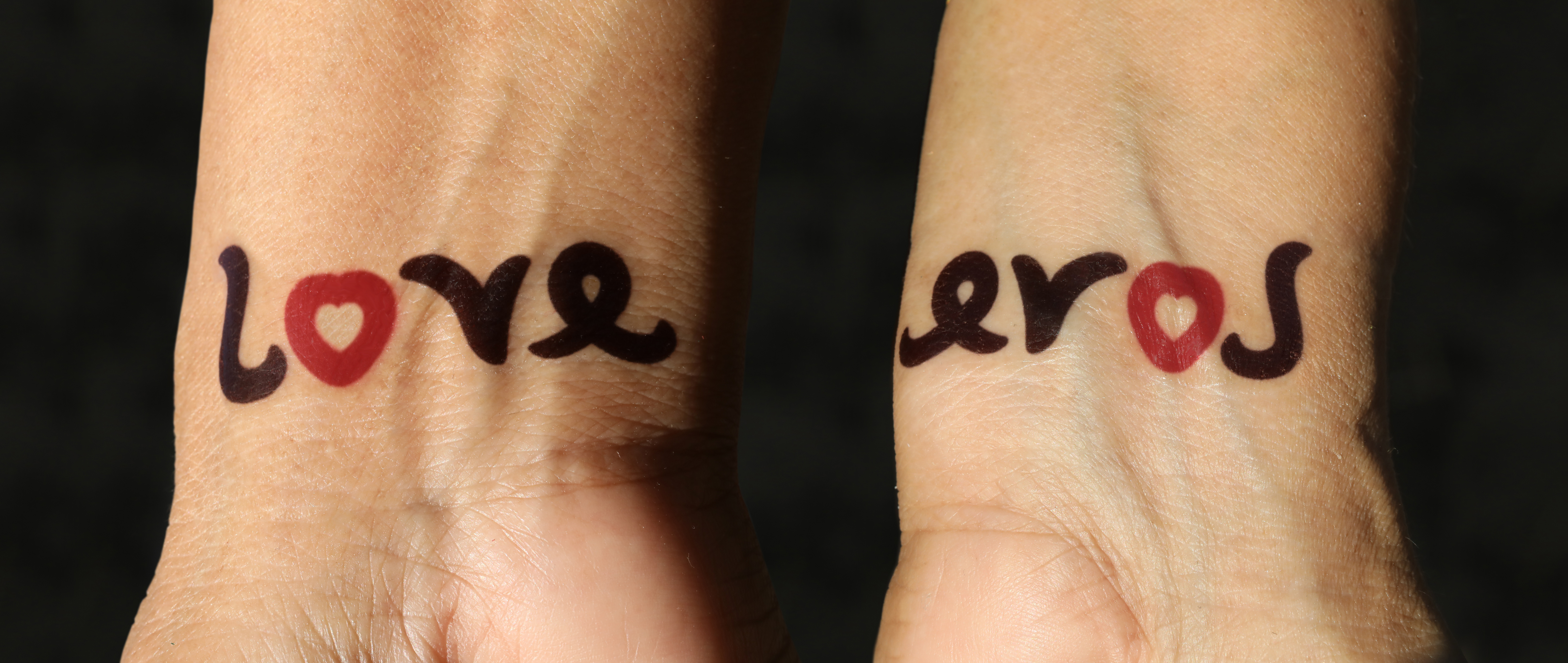
Decal temporary ambigram tattoo Love / eros, on wrists

A temporary tattoo is a non-permanent decorative image on the skin resembling a permanent tattoo. The image can be applied with a decal or with body painting techniques.

=== Types ===
==== Decal-style temporary tattoos ====
Decal (press-on) temporary tattoos are used to decorate any part of the body. They may last for a day or for more than a week. Foil temporary tattoos are a variation of decal-style temporary tattoos, printed using a foil stamping technique instead of using ink.

Cosmetic products, such as decal temporary tattoos, must have had their color additives approved by the U.S. Food and Drug Administration to be legally sold in the United States. Temporary tattoos may include unapproved color additives or other ingredients that cause skin irritation.

==== Airbrush temporary tattoos ====
To paint a temporary decoration on skin, an artist can use an airbrush with alcohol-based cosmetic inks and stencils. The artist should only use inks approved for use on skin. Like decal tattoos, airbrush temporary tattoos are easily removed with rubbing alcohol.

==== Henna temporary tattoos ====
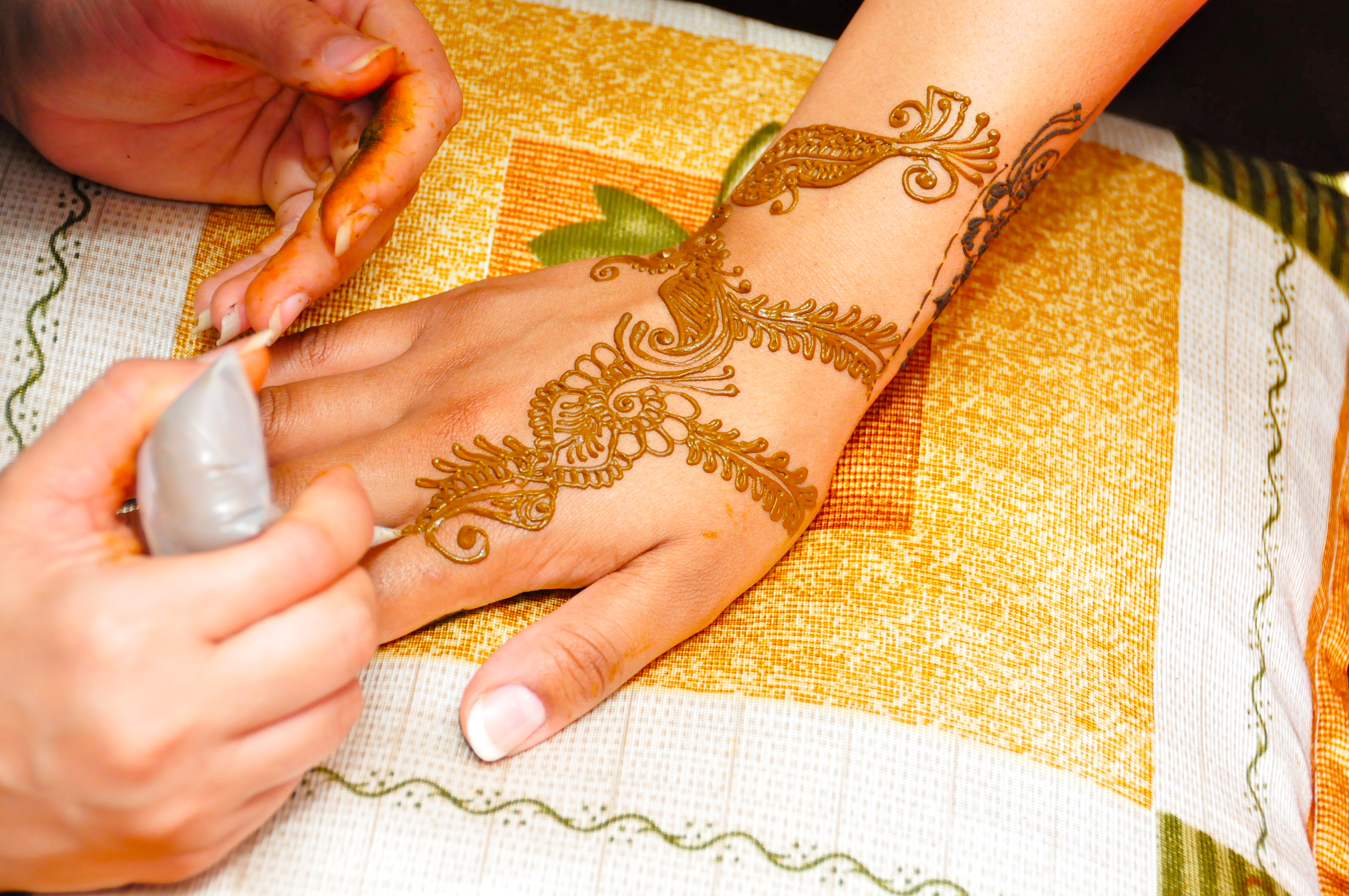
Henna being applied on a hand

Henna is a plant-derived substance painted on the skin to stain it a reddish-orange-to-brown color, creating decorations known as mehndi. In the United States, henna is approved only for use as a hair dye. The natural henna plant is relatively safe for use on skin; allergic reactions are rare. Serious problems can occur, however, from the use of "black henna", which contains the additive paraphenylenediamine (PPD). PPD is a textile dye approved by the FDA for human use only in hair coloring. In Canada, the use of PPD on the skin, including hair dye, is banned. Research has linked these and other ingredients to a range of health problems including allergic reactions, chronic inflammatory reactions, and late-onset allergic reactions to related clothing and hairdressing dyes. They can cause these reactions long after application.

== Religious views ==
Ancient Egyptians used tattoos to show dedication to a deity, and the tattoos were believed to convey divine protection. In Hinduism, Buddhism, and Neopaganism, tattoos are accepted. Southeast Asia has a tradition of protective tattoos variously known as sak yant or yantra tattoos that include Buddhist images, prayers, and symbols. Images of the Buddha or other religious figures have caused controversy in some Buddhist countries when incorporated into tattoos by Westerners who do not follow traditional customs regarding respectful display of images of Buddhas or deities.

=== Judaism ===
Judaism generally prohibits tattoos among its adherents based on the commandments in Leviticus 19. Jews tend to believe this commandment only applies to Jews and not to gentiles. However, an increasing number of non-orthodox young Jews are getting tattoos either for fashion, or an expression of their faith.

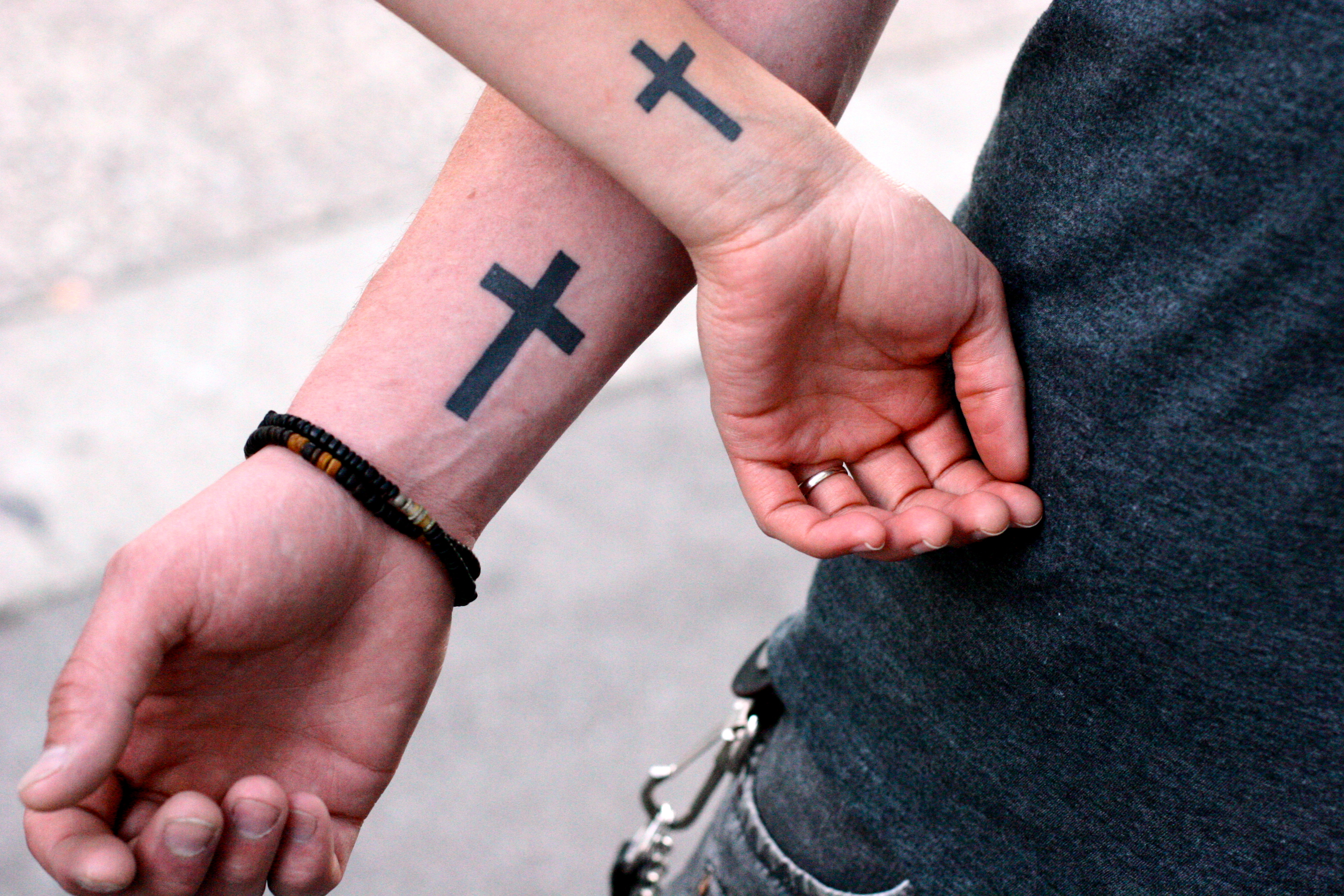
Two people with cross symbol tattoos

=== Christianity ===
There is no specific teaching in the New Testament prohibiting tattoos. Most Christian denominations believe that the Old Covenant ceremonial laws in Leviticus were abrogated with the coming of the New Covenant; that the prohibition of various cultural practices, including tattooing, was intended to distinguish the Israelites from neighbouring peoples for a limited period of time, and was not intended as a universal law to apply to the gentiles for all time. Many Coptic Christians in Egypt have a cross tattoo on their right wrist to differentiate themselves from Muslims. However, some Evangelical and fundamentalist Protestant denominations believe the commandment applies today for Christians and believe it is a sin to get a tattoo.

=== Islam ===
Most scholars of Sunni Islam consider permanent tattoos to be haram for Sunni Muslims. Some scholars of Shia Islam believe Shia Islam does not prohibit tattooing. Some Shia Muslims, including in Lebanon and Iran, have tattoos with religious themes.

== See also ==
=== Styles ===
- Black-and-gray – Style of tattooing that uses only black ink in varying shades
- Blackout tattoo
- Borneo traditional tattooing
- Deq (tattoo) – Traditional Kurdish tattoos
- New school (tattoo)
- Old school (tattoo)
- Peʻa – Traditional male tatau of Samoa

=== Location ===
- Body suit (tattoo)
- Genital tattooing
- Lower back tattoo
- Scleral tattooing
- Sleeve tattoo

=== Others ===
- Body art
- Foreign body granuloma – Bodily response to the presence of a foreign object
- Legal status of tattooing in European countries
- Legal status of tattooing in the United States
- List of tattoo artists
