= Quadrant dentistry =

Approach to dental treatment

Quadrant dentistry is a treatment approach sometimes used in individuals who need much dental treatment. Quadrant dentistry means that all the dental treatment required in a quadrant is carried out in a single appointment. This is perceived as convenient for some dentists and some patients, as fewer appointments are required overall.

The dentition is divided into quadrants:

- Upper right quadrant: upper right first incisor to upper right wisdom tooth
- Upper left quadrant: upper left first incisor to upper left wisdom tooth
- Lower right quadrant: lower right first incisor to lower right wisdom tooth
- Lower left quadrant: lower left first incisor to lower left wisdom tooth

Inferior alveolar nerve blocks anesthetize all the teeth in a lower quadrant, so it can be convenient as only one injection is required for quadrant dentistry carried out in the lower teeth. Rubber dam is often used in this technique. If a tooth extraction is carried out in the same appointment as placing an amalgam filling, amalgam tattoo can result.
