= Carbon stain =

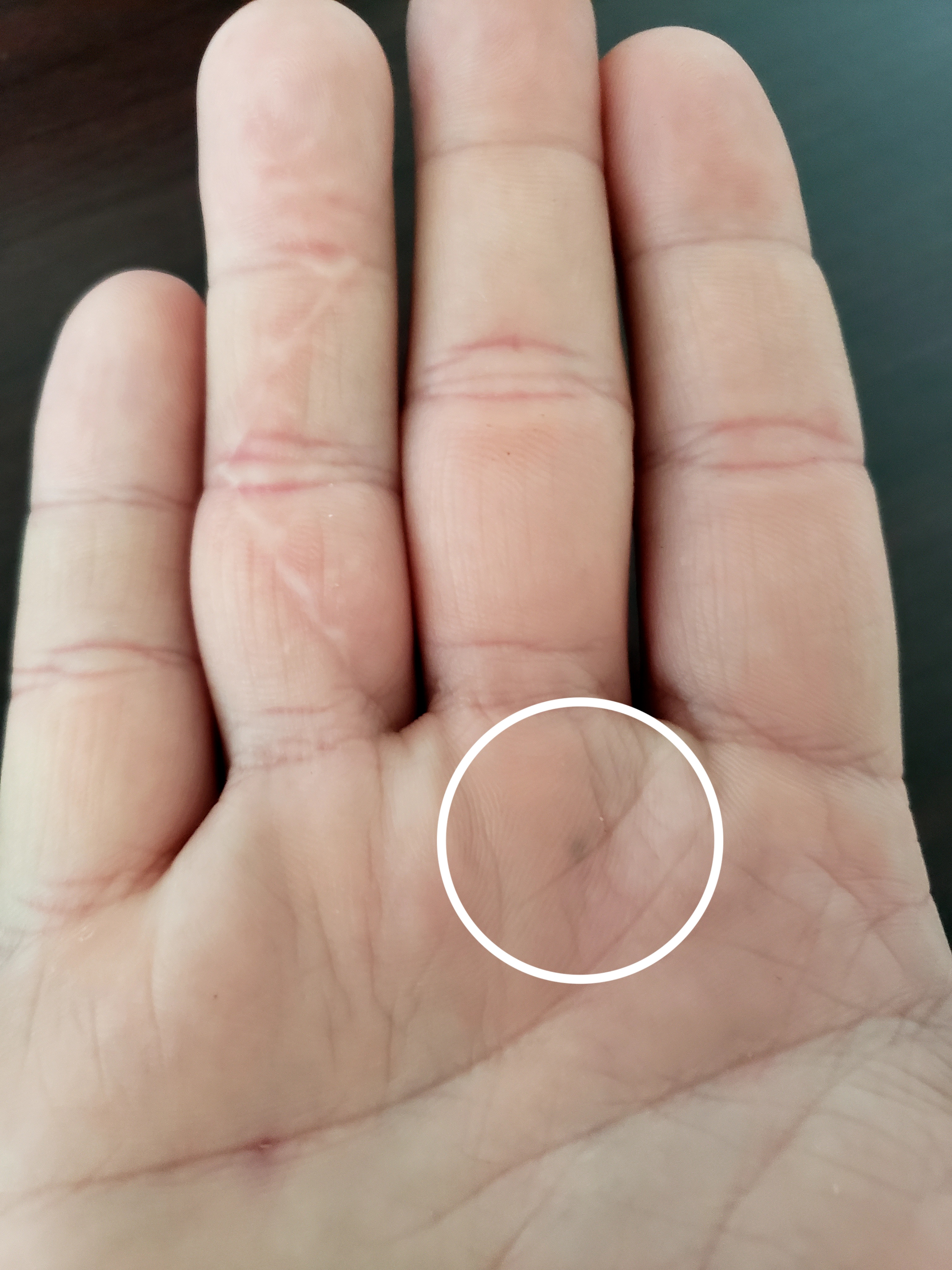
- A carbon stain made from a puncture wound by a pencil (highlighted in circle).
- Specialty: Dermatology

Carbon stains is a skin condition characterized by a discoloration of the skin from embedded carbon, usually occurring due to accidents with firearms or firecrackers, or from a puncture wound by a pencil. It may leave a permanent black mark of embedded graphite, easily mistaken for metastatic melanoma.

== Soot tattoo ==
Soot tattoos are a type of carbon stain made by inserting soot into the dermis layer of the skin via a drug injection. A drug user may try to sterilize the tip of a needle with a flame, leaving a small amount of soot on the outside of the needle. An injection can carry this residual carbon into the skin, leaving a mark.

Soot tattoos are an accidental cutaneous condition. This is distinct from the intentional practice of a tattoo artist creating a tattoo with a design in the skin using soot as a pigment in tattoo ink.

== See also ==
- List of cutaneous conditions
