= Amalgam tattoo =

Common discoloration of tissue in the mouth

- Other names: Localized argyrosis, focal argyrosis (Note: Argyrosis is an uncommon synonym of argyria, a condition caused by excessive exposure to silver, where the skin and mucous membranes are discolored blue or black. Some have criticized these as inappropriate synonyms for amalgam tattoo since silver is just one of several components of dental amalgam (See Neville 2001))
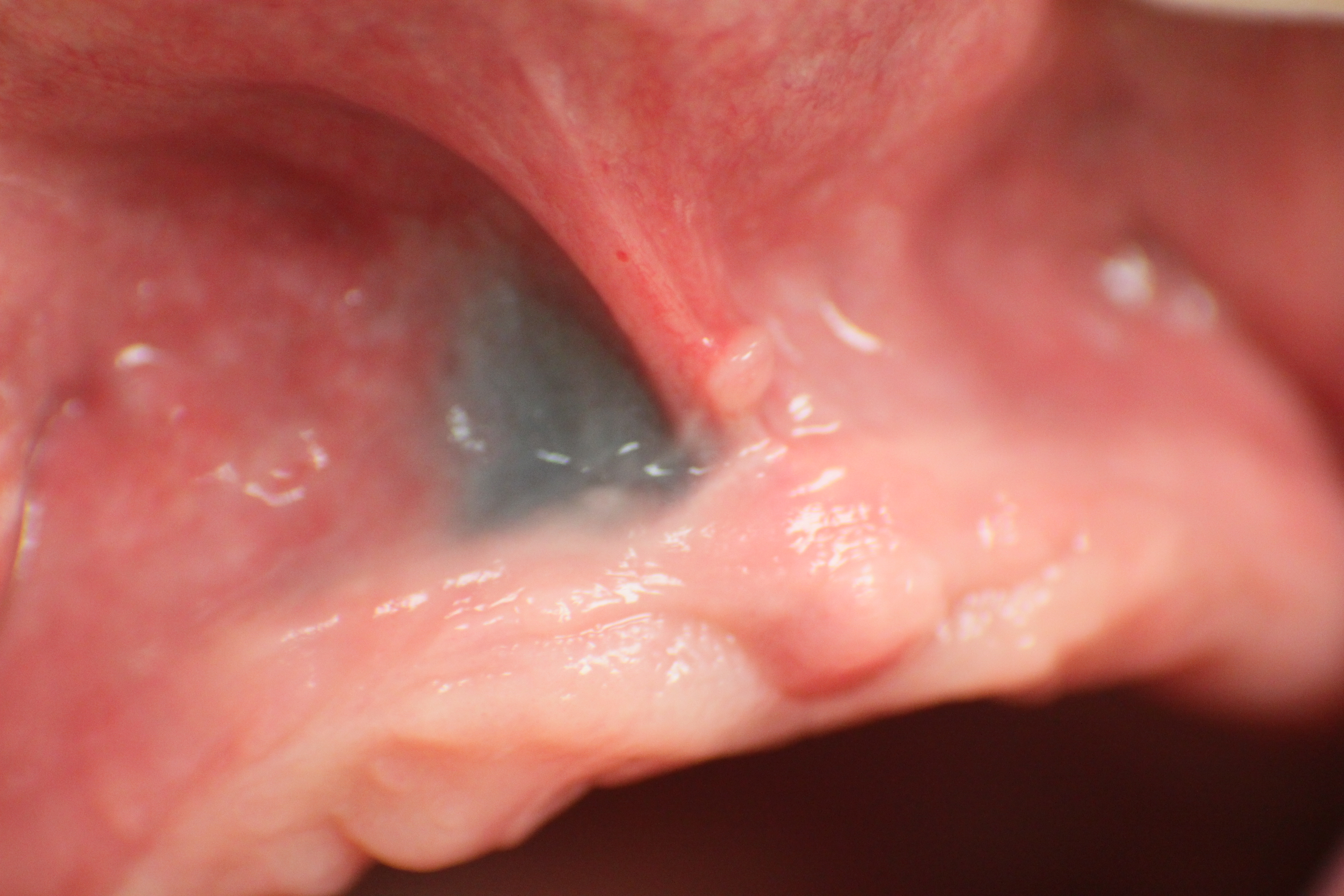
- Amalgam tattoo in upper labial sulcus in an edentulous individual, left behind after teeth have been lost/extracted
- Specialty: Dentistry

Amalgam tattoo is a grey, blue or black area of discoloration on the mucous membranes of the mouth, typically on the gums of the lower jaw. It is a healthcare caused lesion, due to entry of dental amalgam into the soft tissues. It is common, painless, and benign, but it can be mistaken for melanoma.

== Signs and symptoms ==
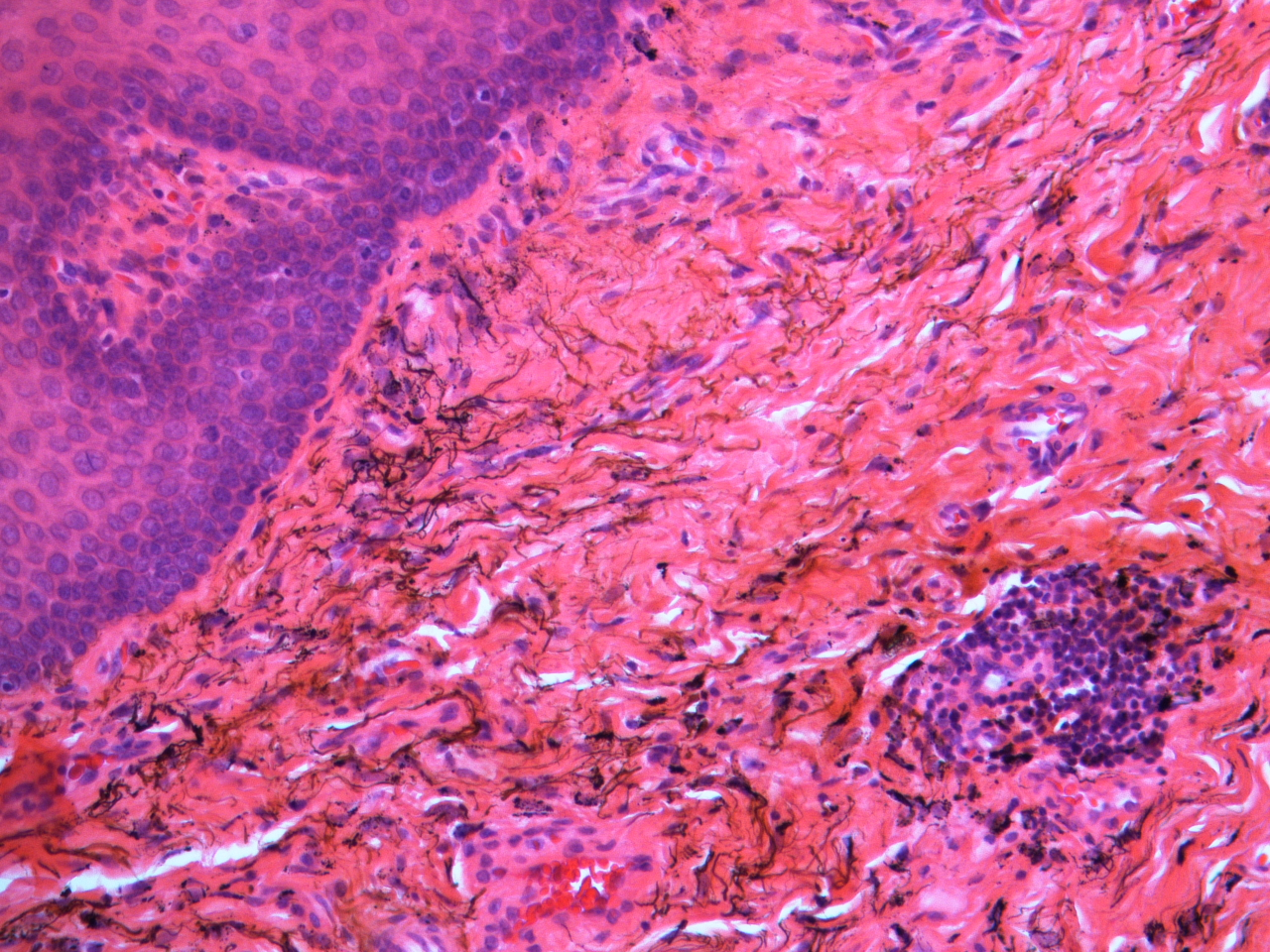
Granular deposits of silver sulfide along elastic fibers of the connective tissue of the oral mucosa. Low chronic inflammatory changes in the form of a lymphocytic aggregate (bottom right)

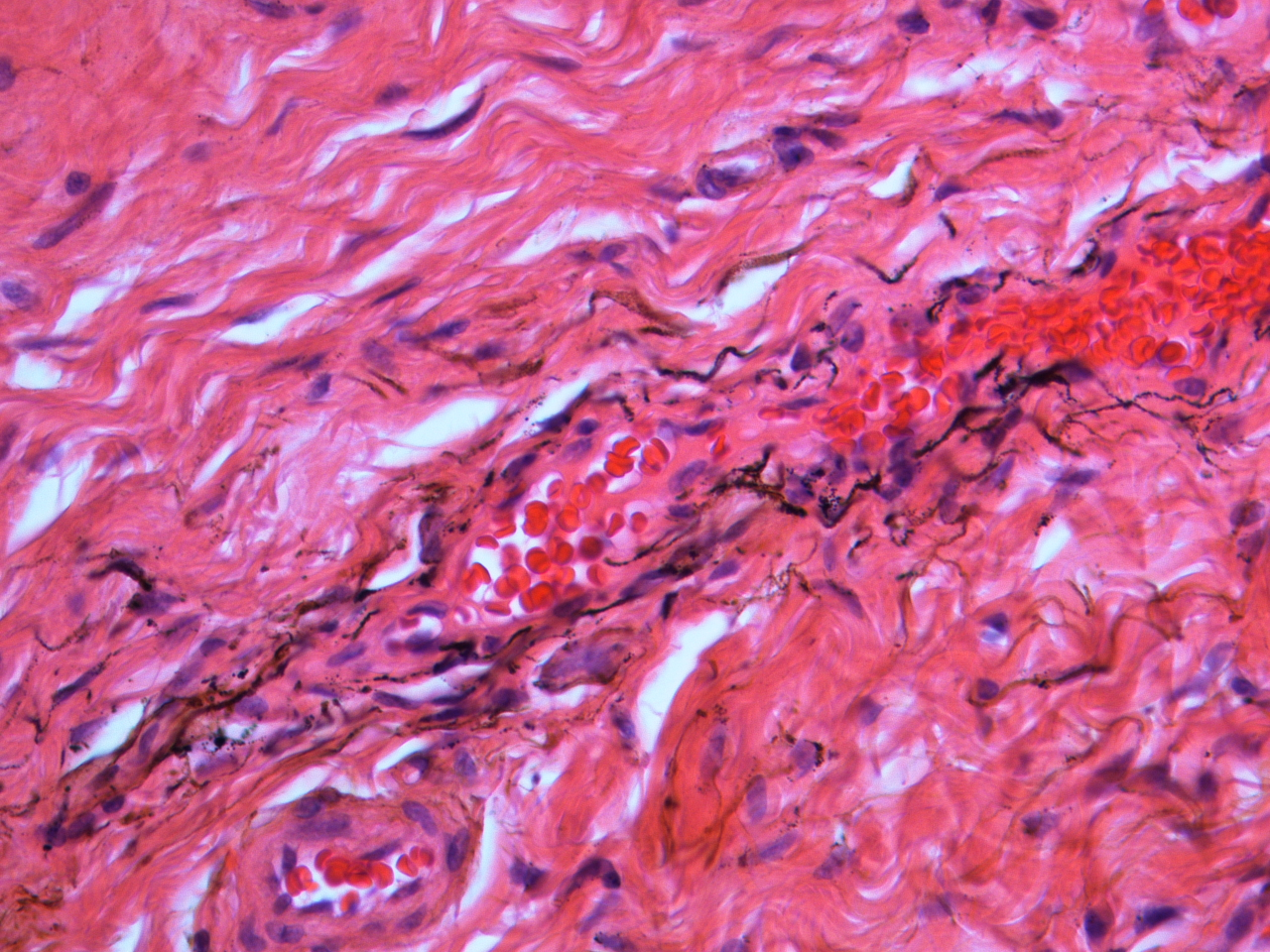
Silver sulfide deposits are found in proximity to small vessels in the oral mucosa

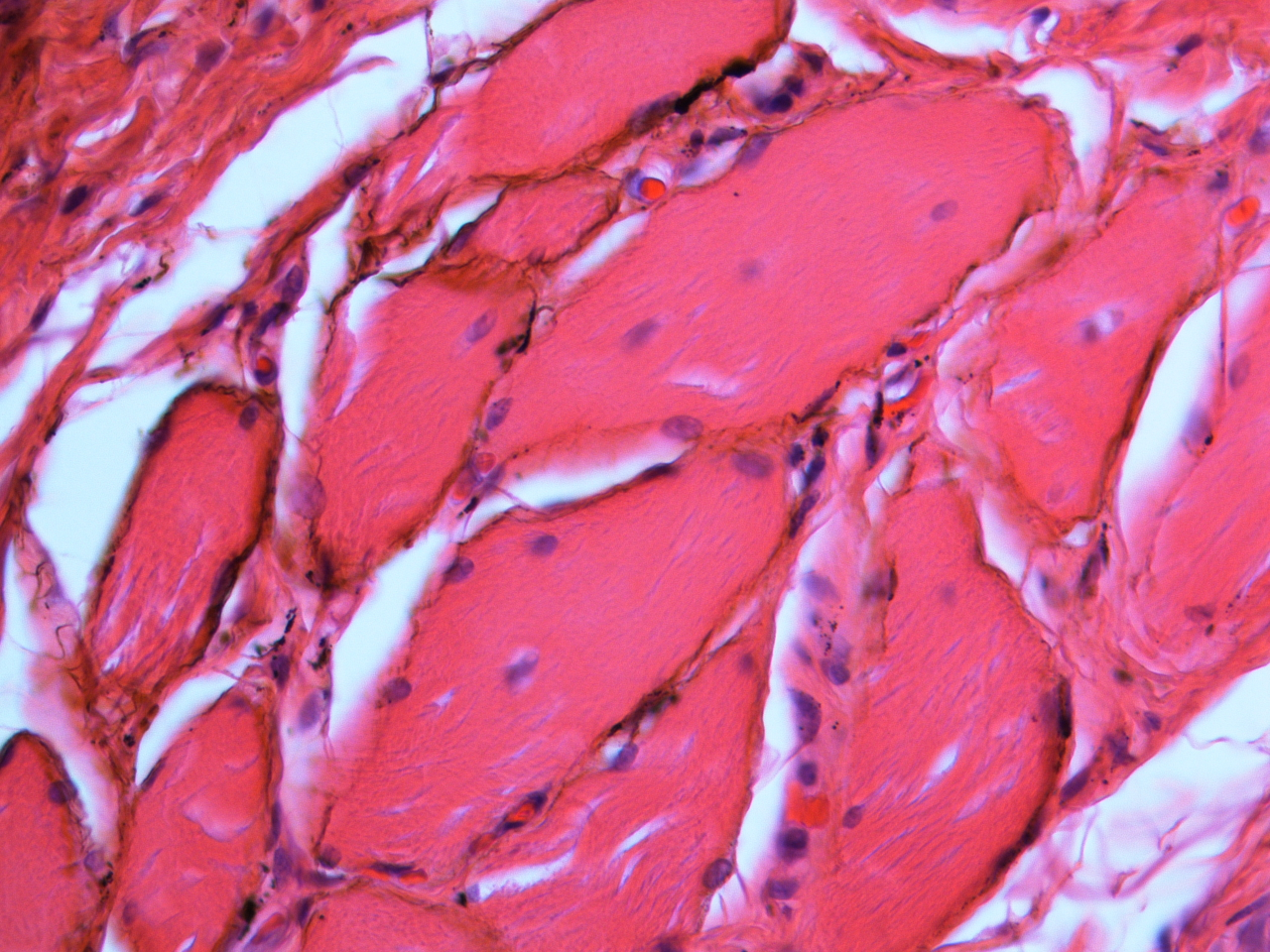
Silver sulfide deposits in the surrounding area of skeletal muscle fibers of the oral mucosa

Amalgam tattoo usually occurs on the mandibular gingiva, often in an area in which an apicoectomy ("root-end filling") with amalgam was carried out. After the gingiva, the alveolar mucosa and the buccal mucosa are the next most common sites, although any mucosal site in the mouth is possible. It is painless, and appears as a blue-black or grey discolored macule on the surface of the mucosa. The borders of the tattoo are variable, and may be well defined, irregular or diffuse.

== Causes ==
Amalgam tattoo is caused by implantation of amalgam into the tissues. It may occur in several ways:

- During placement of an amalgam filling, e.g. if abrasions on the mucosa are present which allow entry of amalgam dust
- Shortly after placement of an amalgam filling, e.g. amalgam particles can contaminate dental floss and lead to linear amalgam tattoos in between the teeth, especially if flossing is carried out immediately after placement of an amalgam filling with a mesial or distal aspect
- Polishing of an amalgam filling
- The pressure from high speed turbine dental drills can be enough to force amalgam particles into soft tissue, as may occur when an old amalgam filling is being removed
- When a tooth with an amalgam filling is extracted, e.g. broken bits of amalgam filling falling into an extraction socket unnoticed
- When an amalgam filling is placed in the same appointment as a tooth extracted, as may occur in "quadrant dentistry"
- Apicectomies are common causes of amalgam tattoo, since the amalgam is being placed inside the alveolus and the soft tissues are replaced on top

Over time, the amalgam particles embedded in the soft tissues corrode. Macrophages take up the exogenous particles, and the silver in amalgam leads to staining of collagen fibers.

A similar appearance can be caused by implantation of graphite (e.g. from pencil leads), and is sometimes termed a graphite tattoo, although this is less common than tattooing with amalgam.

== Diagnosis ==
The diagnosis is clinical. Amalgam tattoo can be distinguished from other causes of localized oral pigmentation because it does not change significantly in size or color, although it may appear to slowly enlarge for several months after the initial implantation of the metal particles. Some amalgam tattoos appear radio-opaque on radiographs (i.e. they show up on x-rays), although in many cases, amalgam tattoos have no radiographic features since the responsible particle(s) of amalgam are very small even though clinically the area of discolored mucosa is much larger.

If necessary, the diagnosis can be confirmed histologically by excisional biopsy, which excludes nevi and melanomas. If a biopsy is taken, the histopathologic appearance is:

- Pigmented fragments of metal within connective tissue
- Staining of reticulin fibers with silver salts
- A scattered arrangement of large, dark, solid fragments or a fine, black or dark brown granules
- Large particles may be surrounded by chronically inflamed fibrous tissue
- Smaller particles surrounded by more significant inflammation, which may be granulomatous or a mixture of lymphocytes and plasma cells

== Prevention ==
Theoretically, routine use of a dental dam during dental procedures which involve amalgam should reduce the risk of amalgam tattoo.

== Treatment ==
No treatment is required since the lesion is entirely benign. Some suggest that amalgam tattoos are best surgically excised so as to ensure the lesion does not represent a melanoma. Others say that excision should only be carried out if there is any doubt over the diagnosis, and that amalgam tattoos are managed by simple reassurance about the nature of the lesion. For example, if radio-opaque particles are demonstrated on the x-ray, biopsy is unnecessary.

== Epidemiology ==
Amalgam tattoo is found in up to 1% of people in the general population. It is the most common cause of solitary or focal pigmentation of the oral mucosa.
