= Guinea Pig Club =

Support group for injured World War II aircrew

The Guinea Pig Club
- Formation: June 1941
- Founder: Archibald McIndoe
- Dissolved: 2007
- Type: Patient support group
- Purpose: Social club and mutual support network for injured servicemen following reconstructive surgery

It has been described as the most exclusive Club in the world, but the entrance fee is something most men would not care to pay and the conditions of membership are arduous in the extreme.

— Archibald McIndoe, 1947

The Guinea Pig Club, established in 1941, was a social club and mutual support network for British and allied aircrew injured during World War II. Its membership was made up of patients of Archibald McIndoe in Ward III at Queen Victoria Hospital, East Grinstead, Sussex, who had undergone experimental reconstructive plastic surgery, including facial reconstruction, generally after receiving burn injuries in aircraft. The club remained active after the end of the war, and its annual reunion meetings continued until 2007.

== Name ==
The name "Guinea Pig" – the rodent species commonly used as a laboratory test subject – was chosen to reflect the experimental nature of the techniques and equipment used for reconstructive work at East Grinstead. The treatment of burns by surgery was in its infancy, and many casualties were suffering from injuries which, only a few years earlier, would have led to certain death. The hospital was nicknamed "the Sty".

== Origins ==
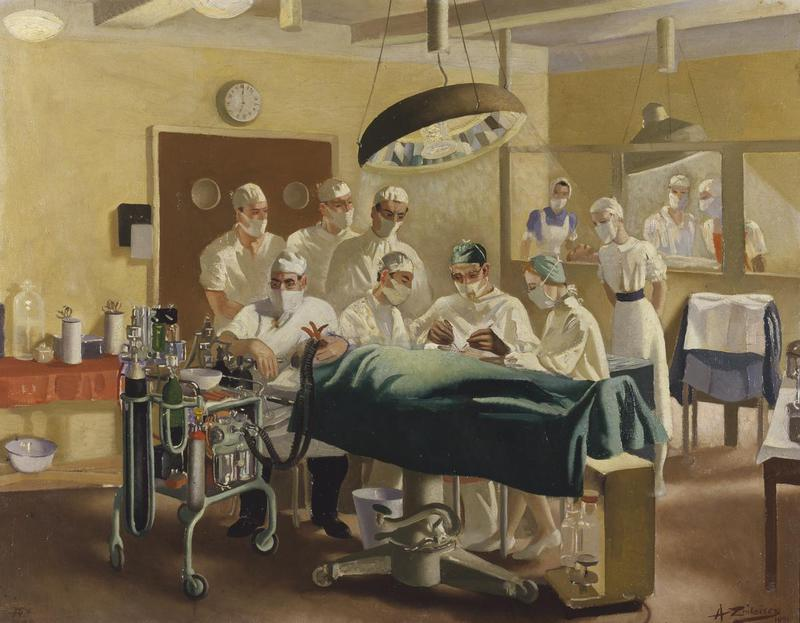
McIndoe operating at East Grinstead: painting by Anna Zinkeisen, 1944

The club was established informally in June 1941 with 39 patients, primarily as a drinking club, and rapidly won McIndoe's endorsement. The members were aircrew patients in Ward III and the surgeons and anaesthetists who treated them. Aircrew members had to be serving airmen who had gone through at least two surgical procedures. By the end of the war the club had 649 members. (642 names are listed on the "Roll of Honour" memorial at Queen Victoria Hospital.)

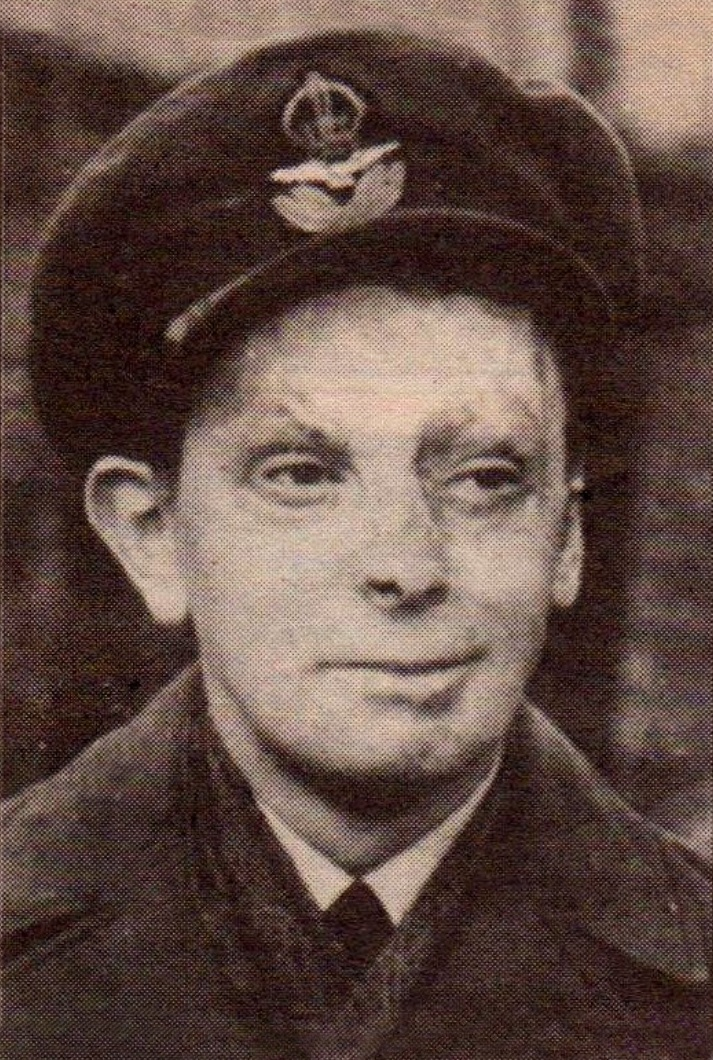
Frankie Truhlář, a Czech member of the club

The original members were Royal Air Force (RAF) aircrew who had severe burns, generally to the face or hands. Most were British but other significant minorities included Canadians, Australians, New Zealanders and by the end of the war Americans, French, Russians, Czechs and Poles. In 1943, a dedicated Canadian wing was built at the hospital, on the initiative of the Royal Canadian Air Force and at Canadian expense. During the Battle of Britain, most of the patients at East Grinstead were fighter pilots, but by the end of the war around 80% of the members were from bomber crews of RAF Bomber Command. A minority of members had suffered non-burns-related injuries (for example, maxillofacial damage incurred in crashes); while another small minority came from army or navy rather than air force backgrounds. A few members even joined the club after the war's end, through injuries sustained in peacetime accidents, as Ward III remained operational until 1948.

Before the war the RAF had made preparations by setting up burns units in several hospitals to treat the expected casualties. At East Grinstead, McIndoe and his colleagues, including Albert Ross Tilley, developed and improved many techniques for treating and reconstructing burns victims. They had to deal with very severe injuries: one man, Air Gunner Les Wilkins, lost his face and hands and McIndoe recreated his fingers by making incisions between his knuckles.

Aware that many patients would have to stay in hospital for several years and undergo many reconstructive operations, MacIndoe set out to make their lives relaxed and socially productive. He gave much thought to the reintegration of patients into normal life after treatment, an aspect of care that had previously been neglected. They were encouraged to lead as normal a life as possible, including being permitted to wear their own clothes or service uniforms instead of "convalescent blues", and to leave the hospital at will. Local families were encouraged to welcome them as guests, and other residents to treat them without distinction: East Grinstead became "the town that didn't stare". The Guinea Pig Club was part of these efforts to make life in hospital easier, and to rebuild patients psychologically in preparation for life outside. There were even barrels of pale ale in the wards – partly in the interests of re-hydrating patients whose injuries had left them dangerously dehydrated, but also to encourage an informal and happy atmosphere.

Later, many of the men also served in other capacities in RAF operations control rooms, and occasionally as pilots between surgeries. Those unable to serve in any capacity received full pay until the last surgical operations and only then were invalided out of the service. McIndoe also later loaned some of his patients money for their re-entry into civilian life.

A club magazine, The Guinea Pig, was first published in April 1944.

== Post-war history ==
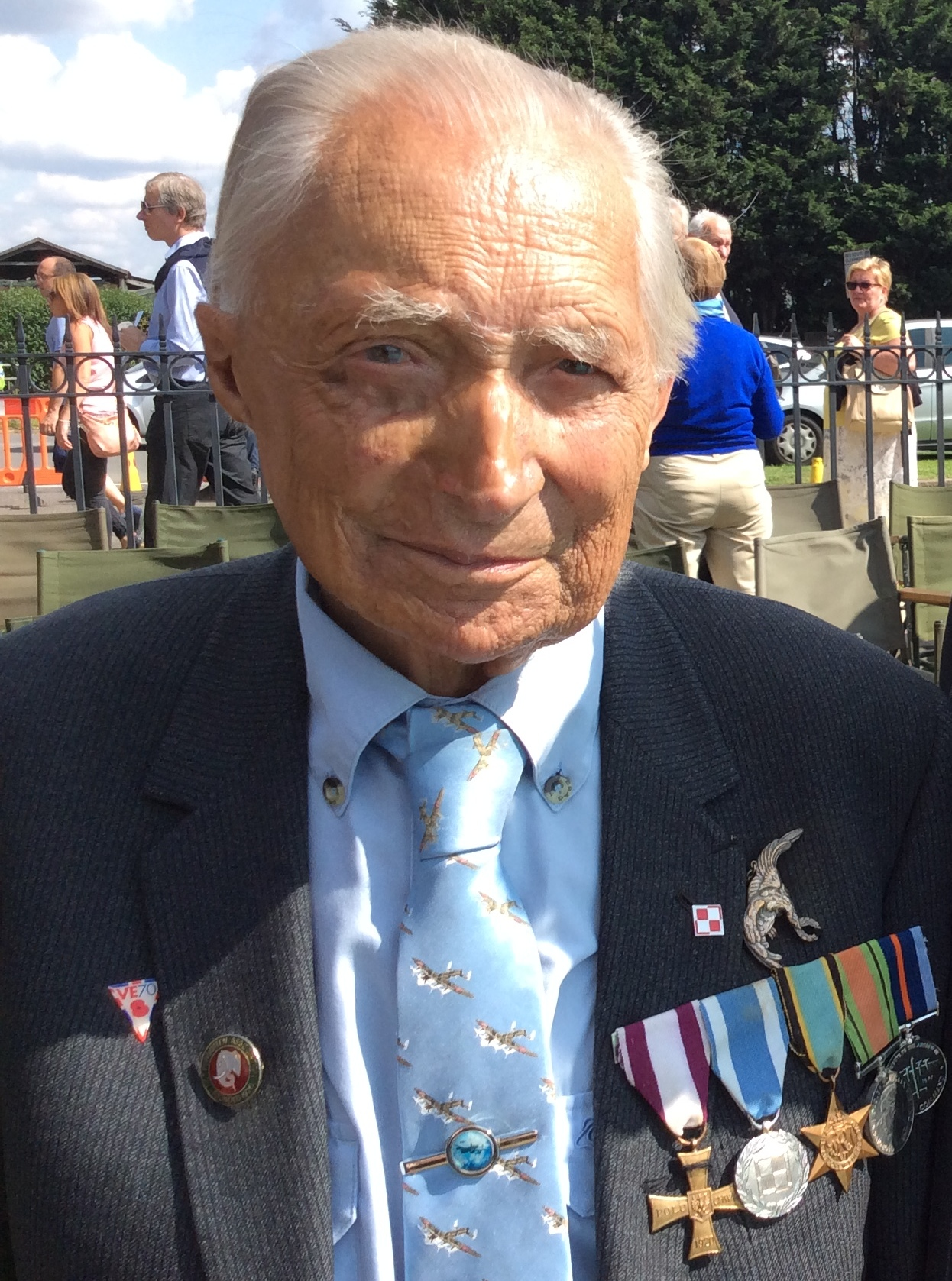
Jan Stangryciuk-Black, the last surviving member of the club, photographed in 2017

The club was not disbanded at the end of the war, but continued to meet for over sixty years, offering practical support and a sense of community to former patients. The Guinea Pig magazine also continued to be published until 2003. Annual meetings at East Grinstead attracted visitors from all over the world. McIndoe had been elected life president at the club's foundation: after his death in 1960, Prince Philip, Duke of Edinburgh, became president. Geoffrey Page was the first chairman; and Tom Gleave served as the first and only Chief Guinea Pig until his death in 1993.

In 2001 (the 60th anniversary of the club's foundation) the members agreed to continue holding their annual reunions at East Grinstead until there were only 50 members left. By 2004, there were 120 survivors; and by 2007 there were 97 (57 in Britain; 40 elsewhere in the world), their ages ranging from 82 to 102. In the event, 2007 marked the last reunion. It attracted over 60 attendees, but in view of the survivors' age and frailty the decision was then taken to wind the club down. There were believed to be 29 survivors by April 2015, and 17 by November 2016. The last members of the club were Sam Gallop and Jan Stangryciuk-Black, who were both aged 101 when they died only days apart in October 2023.

== Brevet ==
The club symbol, or "brevet", depicted a guinea pig flanked by oversized RAF "wings". Two artistic renditions were used: the first showed the guinea pig sitting upright with his ears swept back, perhaps in imitation of a pilot at the controls of his aircraft; while the second showed a more naturalistic guinea pig on all fours.

== Anthem ==
The words to the club anthem were written by Edward "Blackie" Blacksell. They were inspired by the World War I song "Fred Karno's Army", and (like that song) sung to the tune Aurelia by Samuel Sebastian Wesley, best known as the tune of the popular hymn "The Church's One Foundation". The final line of the second verse is an example of a mind rhyme.

We are McIndoe's army,
We are his Guinea Pigs.
With dermatomes and pedicles,
Glass eyes, false teeth and wigs.
And when we get our discharge
We'll shout with all our might:
"Per ardua ad astra"
We'd rather drink than fight.

John Hunter runs the gas works,
Ross Tilley wields the knife.
And if they are not careful
They'll have your flaming life.
So, Guinea Pigs, stand ready
For all your surgeons' calls:
And if their hands aren’t steady
They’ll whip off both your ears.

We've had some mad Australians,
Some French, some Czechs, some Poles.
We've even had some Yankees,
God bless their precious souls.
While as for the Canadians –
Ah! That’s a different thing.
They couldn’t stand our accent
And built a separate Wing.

We are McIndoe’s army,
(As first verse)

== Legacy ==
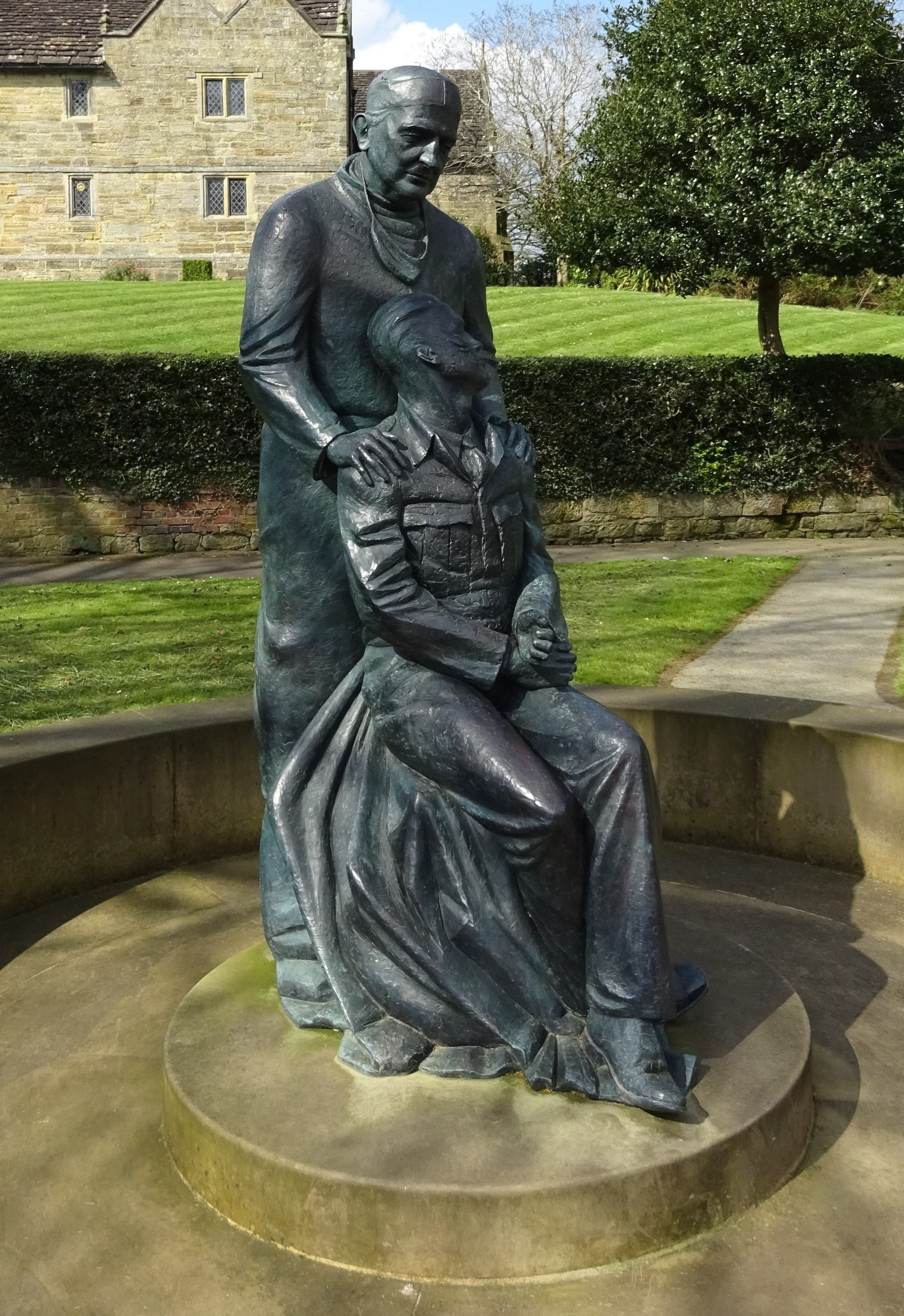
Monument to Sir Archibald McIndoe in East Grinstead

Sixteen members of the club wrote books about their experiences, some of them during the war. The best known, and most influential in raising public awareness of McIndoe's work, was Richard Hillary's The Last Enemy, originally published in the United States as Falling Through Space (1942).

One of the pubs in East Grinstead adopted the name "The Guinea Pig". It closed in 2008 and was demolished in 2009 to make way for a social housing development named Guinea Pig Place.

A painted Roll of Honour is displayed in a corridor of the Canadian Wing at Queen Victoria Hospital.

A bronze monument commemorating McIndoe, sculpted by Martin Jennings (whose own father was a Guinea Pig), was unveiled in East Grinstead High Street in 2014. It depicts a seated airman, with his burned hands clawed together, and his scarred face turned to one side. Behind him, resting a reassuring hand on each shoulder, stands the figure of McIndoe. The two figures are encircled by a stone bench.

In November 2016, a monument honouring members of the club was unveiled by the Duke of Edinburgh, its president, at the National Memorial Arboretum, Staffordshire.

An exhibition in East Grinstead Museum honouring the members of the club was opened in December 2016 by Susan Piper, Lord Lieutenant of West Sussex, with four club members in attendance.

In 2017, the Guinea Pig Club directly inspired the formation of the CASEVAC Club, a similar mutual support group for service personnel badly injured in the Iraq and Afghan wars of the 21st century.

== Notable members ==
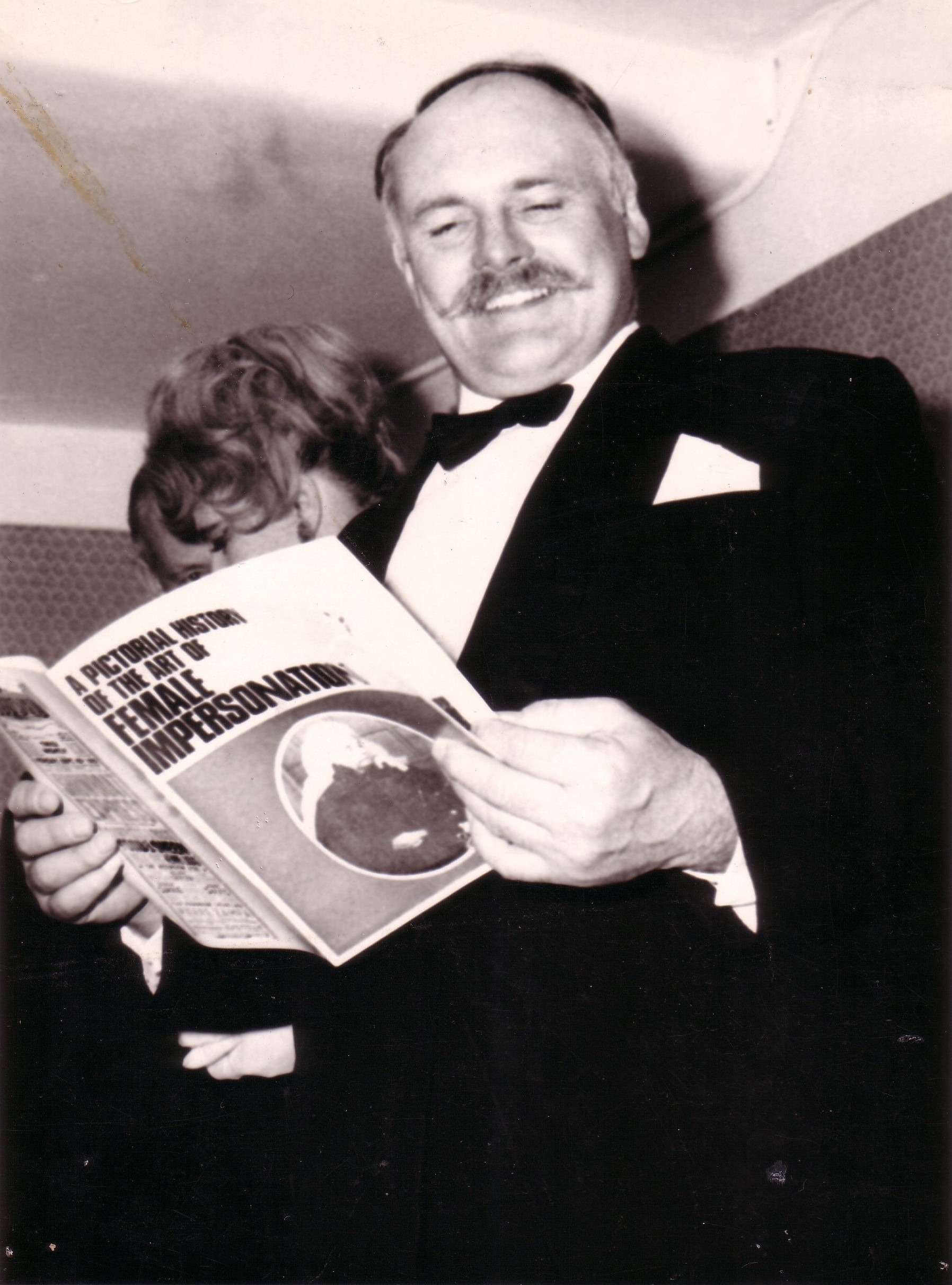
The comedy actor Jimmy Edwards, a member of the club. He grew his trademark handlebar moustache in order to camouflage his facial injuries.

- George Bennions (1913–2004)
- Harold Bird-Wilson (1919–2000)
- Robert Boscawen (1923–2013)
- Bob Doe (1920–2010)
- Jimmy Edwards (1920–1988)
- Bill Foxley (1923–2010)
- Tom Gleave (1908–1993)
- Richard Hillary (1919–1943)
- Colin Hodgkinson (1920–1996)
- Josef Koukal (1912–1980)
- Eric Lock (1919–1941)
- Jackie Mann (1914–1995)
- Geoffrey Page (1920–2000)
- Richard Pape (1916–1995)
- Alois Šiška (1914–2003)
- Jan Stangryciuk-Black (1922–2023)
- František 'Frankie' Truhlář (1917–1946)
- Robert Wright (1906–1992)

== Popular culture ==
Charles MacLean, himself a Guinea Pig, published a novel, The Heavens are not too High, in 1957, telling the story of a fighter pilot who suffers severe burns.

The 1991 ITV miniseries A Perfect Hero centres on a young RAF fighter pilot shot down during the Battle of Britain who survives with severe burns, and his treatment, recovery, and experiences as a disfigured casualty of war: aspects of the story echo that of Richard Hillary, as recorded in his memoir, The Last Enemy.

Guinea Pig Club was the title of a play centred on McIndoe's work produced at York Theatre Royal in 2012, featuring Graeme Hawley as McIndoe.

Foyle's War, series 3, episode 2, "Enemy Fire" (2004) features a stately home converted to a burns unit in which the patients are encouraged to drink beer, wear their own clothes and organise entertainment. McIndoe is mentioned in passing.

Joseph Randolph Richard's novel Incendo (2015) tells the story of a badly burned pilot and his membership of the club.

A film entitled The Guinea Pig Club, starring Richard E. Grant as McIndoe, was reported to be planned for production in 2018.

== See also ==
- Mollie Lentaigne, a medical artist and nurse at East Grinstead who made drawings of McIndoe's procedures

== Bibliography ==
=== Memoirs ===
(Listed in order of date of first publication)

- Gleave, Tom (1941). I had a Row with a German. London: Macmillan.
- Hillary, Richard (1942). The Last Enemy. London: Macmillan & Co.
- Simpson, William (1942). One of Our Pilots is Safe. London: Hamish Hamilton.
- Simpson, William (1944). The Way of Recovery. London: Hamish Hamilton.
- Pape, Richard (1953). Boldness Be My Friend. London: Elek.
- Simpson, William (1955). I Burned my Fingers. London: Putnam.
- Hodgkinson, Colin (1957). Best Foot Forward. London: Odhams.
- Rawnsley, C. F.; Wright, Robert (1957). Night Fighter. London: Collins.
- Čapka, Jo (1958). Red Sky at Night: the Story of Jo Čapka, DFM. London: Anthony Blond.
- Page, Geoffrey (1981). Tale of a Guinea Pig. London: Pelham Books. ISBN 0720713544. [revised edition published 1999 as Shot Down in Flames: a World War II fighter pilot's remarkable tale of survival. ISBN 1902304101]

In addition, The Guinea Pig magazine regularly featured a column "How I became a Guinea Pig", in which individual members recounted their personal experiences.

=== Secondary accounts ===
- Anderson, Julie (2011). War, Disability, and Rehabilitation in Britain: "Soul of a Nation". Manchester: Manchester University Press. ISBN 9780719082504.
- Andrew, D. R. (1994). "The Guinea Pig Club". Aviation, Space, and Environmental Medicine. 65 (5): 428–433. PMID 8024526.
- Bennett, J. P. (1988). "A history of the Queen Victoria Hospital, East Grinstead". British Journal of Plastic Surgery. 41 (4): 422–40. doi:10.1016/0007-1226(88)90088-4. PMID 3293680.
- Bishop, Edward (1963). The Guinea Pig Club. London: Macmillan.
- Bishop, Edward (2004) [2001]. McIndoe's Army: the story of the Guinea Pig Club and its indomitable members (revised ed.). London: Grub Street. ISBN 1904943020.
- Formánek, Vitek (1998). The Stories of Brave Guinea Pigs. Hailsham: J&KH. ISBN 1900511843.
- Godwin, Y. (1997). "'Time is the healer': McIndoe's Guinea Pigs fifty years on". British Journal of Plastic Surgery. 50 (2): 88–98. doi:10.1016/S0007-1226(97)91319-9. PMID 9135424.
- Kean, T. (1993). The Story of the Guinea Pig Club, 1940–1993. Lisek. ISBN 0951809997.
- Mayhew, Emily R. (2004). The Reconstruction of Warriors: Archibald McIndoe, the Royal Air Force and the Guinea Pig Club. London: Greenhill. ISBN 1-85367-610-1. [revised edition published 2018 as The Guinea Pig Club: Archibald McIndoe and the RAF in World War II. ISBN 978-1-78438-321-3]
- Mosley, Leonard (1962). Faces from the Fire: the biography of Sir Archibald McIndoe. London: Weidenfeld & Nicolson.
- Williams, Peter; Harrison, Ted (1979). McIndoe's Army: the injured airmen who faced the world. London: Pelham. ISBN 0720711916.
