= Tom Gleave =

British fighter pilot

- Born: 6 September 1908
- Died: June 1993 (aged 84)
- Military career
- Allegiance: United Kingdom
- Branch: Royal Air Force
- Service years: 1930–1953
- Rank: Group Captain
- Units: No. 87 Squadron RAF; No. 85 Squadron RAF
- Commands: RAF Manston; 253 Squadron
- Conflicts: World War II: Battle of Britain; Channel Front
- Awards: Commander of the Order of the British Empire

Group Captain Thomas Percy Gleave CBE (6 September 1908 – June 1993) was a British fighter pilot during the Battle of Britain. He was shot down in his Hurricane the summer of 1940 and grievously burned. He was one of the first patients treated by Sir Archibald McIndoe at the Queen Victoria Hospital, East Grinstead, and became the first and only Chief Guinea Pig.

== Life ==
Gleave was educated at Westminster High School and Liverpool Collegiate School. He joined the Sefton Tanning Company in 1924 and began flying, earning a private pilot's license in 1928. In 1930 he was commissioned into the RAF where he excelled; by 1933 he was a member of the RAF aerobatic team. After a period as a flying instructor he joined RAF Bomber Command on 1 January 1939.

At the outbreak of war Gleave requested a return to RAF Fighter Command, which was granted. By June 1940 he was in command of 253 Squadron, flying Hurricanes. Command was handed to Squadron Leader H Starr in August 1940, but Gleave resumed command when Starr was shot down on 31 August. Gleave's tally by the time he was shot down was five Messerschmitt Bf 109s (in a single day) and one Junkers Ju 88.

Gleave was shot down on his first sortie after restoration of his command, on 31 August 1940, and badly burned. Initially treated at Orpington Hospital, he regained consciousness underneath a bed during an air raid. His wife was called to his bedside and asked the heavily bandaged Gleave "what on earth have you been doing with yourself?" "I had a row with a German" was his characteristically laconic reply, and this became the title of the book he wrote under the pseudonym 'RAF Casualty', published in 1941.

He was transferred to East Grinstead where McIndoe reconstructed his nose. He recovered sufficiently to be returned to non-flying duties and briefly commanded RAF Northolt before taking over RAF Manston, from where he dispatched the six Fairey Swordfish of 825 Squadron in their attempt to sink the Scharnhorst, Gneisenau and Prinz Eugen. He was then seconded to the planning group for what became Operation Overlord and promoted to Group Captain. He served as Eisenhower's Head of Air Plans at SHAEF from 1 October 1944 to 15 July 1945 and was then Senior Air Staff Officer, RAF Delegation to France, from 1945 to 1947.

He was finally invalided out of the RAF in 1953, and returned to East Grinstead for further reconstructive surgery. He then joined the Historical Section of the Cabinet Office where he remained for the next thirty years, being elected a Fellow of the Royal Historical Society and becoming Air Historian and deputy chairman to the Battle of Britain Fighter Association.

As a prominent member of the Guinea Pig Club, Gleave is discussed in numerous books about McIndoe's work, including Faces from the Fire and McIndoe's Army, and he wrote a monograph I had a Row with a German on his experiences. He was interviewed for the 2002 drama documentary The Guinea Pig Club and is discussed in most histories of the Guinea Pigs. He is credited as a technical and tactical advisor for the 1969 film Battle of Britain.

== Awards and honours ==
Twice mentioned in dispatches, Gleave was appointed a CBE for his work on Overlord, and the American Legion of Honor (later converted to the Bronze Star). He was awarded the French Légion d'honneur and Croix de Guerre and the wings of the Polish and French air forces.

He was elected Fellow of the Royal Historical Society.
