= Jan Stangryciuk-Black =

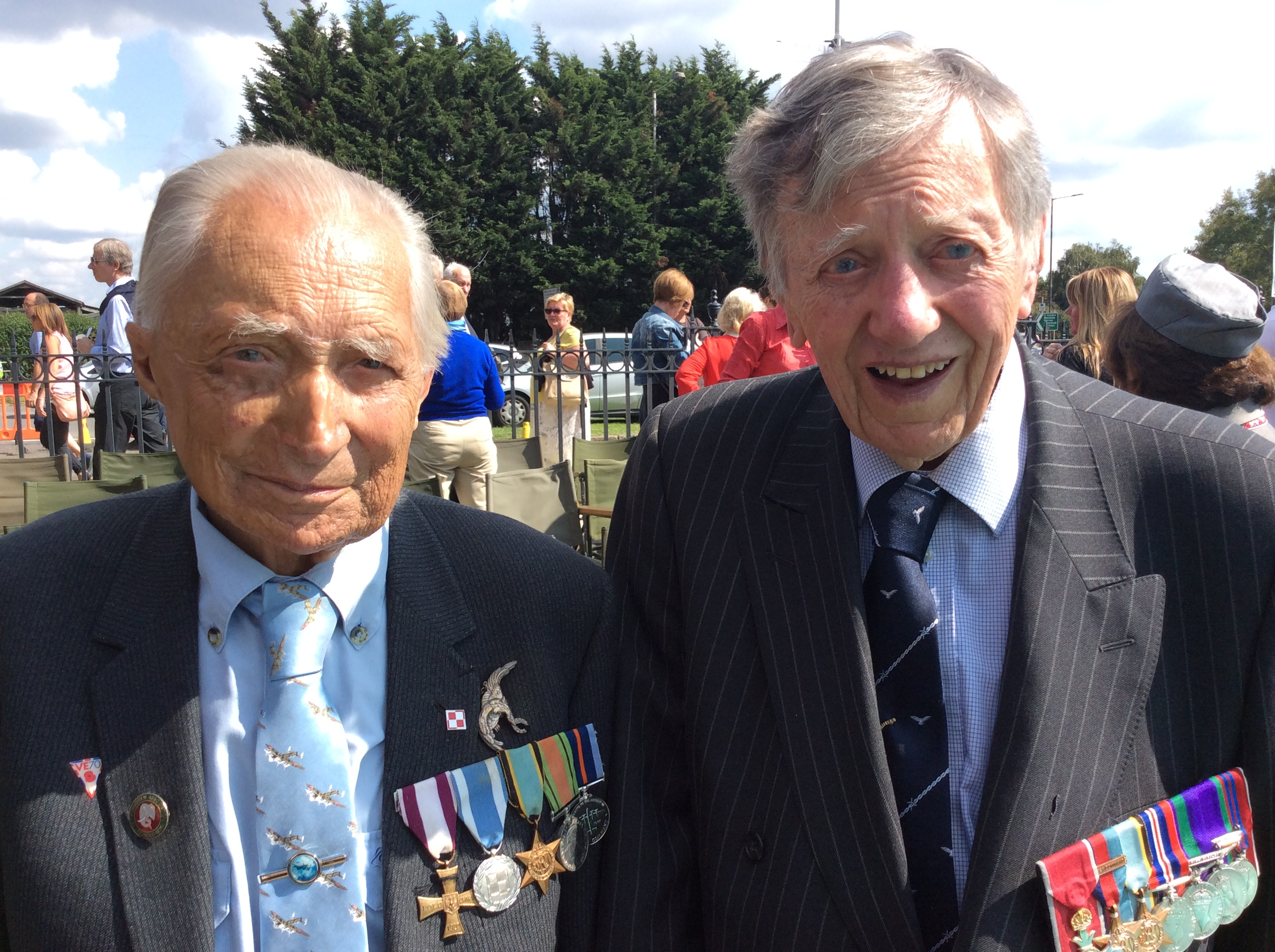
Jan Stangryciuk-Black (left), photographed in 2017 with Air Commodore Charles Clarke

Jan Stanisław Stangryciuk-Black (born Stangryciuk; 18 April 1922 – 22 October 2023) was a Polish-born airman in the Royal Air Force (RAF) during the Second World War. He served in the 300 "Land of Masovia" Polish Bomber Squadron, and was the last surviving member of the Guinea Pig Club, a group of allied aircrew who received pioneering plastic surgery for burn injuries.

== Early life ==
Jan Stangryciuk was born on 18 April 1922 in Chełm, eastern Poland. In 1934, his family moved to Argentina, where he spent his teenage years on a farm.

Following the outbreak of war in Europe, he volunteered for British service at an enlistment drive in Buenos Aires. He subsequently travelled to the United Kingdom by ship, arriving in Belfast.

== Military career ==
After passing medical examinations, Stangryciuk joined the Polish Air Force under British command, training as a rear gunner in the 300 "Land of Masovia" Polish Bomber Squadron. During an operational training flight on 2 November 1942, his Vickers Wellington bomber suffered an engine malfunction and crash-landed near its base, leaving him the sole survivor.

He sustained severe burns to his face and hands, requiring over twenty reconstructive plastic surgeries under Sir Archibald McIndoe at the Queen Victoria Hospital in East Grinstead, known for its experimental surgery for burns injuries. During his recovery, he joined the Guinea Pig Club, a mutual support group made up of McIndoe's patients.

== Later life ==
Despite the trauma, Stangryciuk returned to active service and completed multiple combat missions. After the war, he settled in England, participating in commemorative events to highlight the contributions of Polish forces in the RAF.

== Personal life and death ==
Stangryciuk married Evelyn Black, whom he had met during the war, in October 1946. Shortly afterwards, at McIndoe's suggestion, he applied for a British passport under the name Jan Black, so that he and his wife could travel without difficulty to Argentina to meet his family. He subsequently used the hyphenated surname Stangryciuk-Black or Black-Stangreciuk. Evelyn died in 2009.

In 2022, his wartime medals and personal savings were stolen during a burglary, prompting a public fundraising effort.

Stangryciuk-Black died on 22 October 2023 in London, aged 101. He was the last surviving member of the Guinea Pig Club, having outlived another member, Sam Gallop, also aged 101, by just 5 days.
