= Richard Pape =

British World War 2 escapee, adventurer, autobiographer and novelist

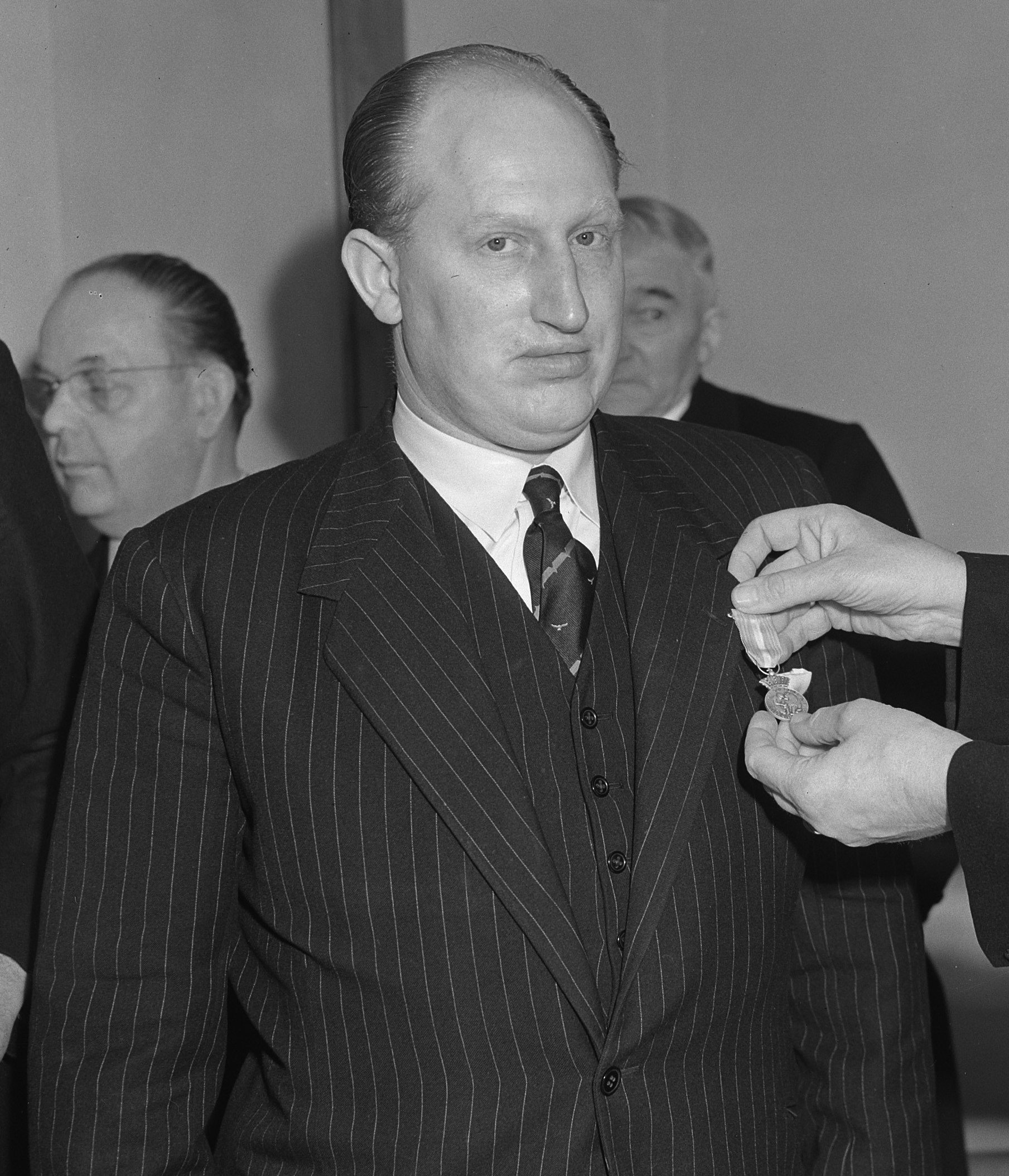
Richard Pape (1954)

Richard Bernard Pape MM (17 March 1916 – 19 June 1995) was a British Second World War escapee, adventurer, autobiographer and novelist.

Pape was born in 1916 in Roundhay, Leeds, Yorkshire. He worked as a journalist in the Yorkshire Post's publicity department, but on the outbreak of the Second World War he joined the Royal Air Force.

He became a sergeant navigator in a Short Stirling bomber. On a 1941 mission he was shot down close to the German/Dutch border, was twice captured and twice escaped. Following his second capture, he was tortured by the Gestapo. He was repatriated by the Germans on health grounds in 1944.

In November of that year, he was on a retraining course when he was burnt in a drunken motorcycle accident on the Isle of Man, which led to his being hospitalised at Queen Victoria Hospital, East Grinstead, for pioneer plastic surgery under Archibald McIndoe: he thus became a member of the Guinea Pig Club.

He was discharged in 1947 and decorated for his persistence as an escaper. He went to live in South Africa and wrote a book-length account of his adventures, Boldness Be My Friend, which he said he wrote to exorcise the demons which plagued him after the war. The book was brought to Anthony Blond's London literary agency in 1952 by Vanora McIndoe, Sir Archibald's daughter. After being read and approved by Blond's colleague Isabel Colegate, it was published in 1953 by Paul Elek, who paid a £600 advance.

Still fighting his demons, in 1955 he drove 17,500 miles (28,200 km) from the North Cape in Norway to the Cape of Good Hope in South Africa, in an Austin A90 Westminster. He then wrote a book, Cape Cold to Cape Hot (1956), about his adventures en route, which reportedly came close to killing him.

He later undertook similar endurance drives in North America for the Rootes Group, and embarked on further adventures in Antarctica, where he fell in the sea at McMurdo Sound.

In 1964, following the advice of his colleague Leonard Cheshire, VC, that he should "do something useful with his life instead of trying to repeatedly kill himself", Pape went to Papua New Guinea where he established a Leonard Cheshire Home for mentally and physically handicapped native children. He also worked as Principal Publications Officer of the Australian administration's Department of Information. He would spend nine and a half years in Papua New Guinea and, while there, he met and married his second wife, Stephanie Helen Prouting, a solicitor working for the Public Solicitor's Office in Port Moresby.

In June 1965, Pape returned his Military Medal to the Queen in protest at The Beatles having been awarded the MBE. He was quoted as saying: "The Beatles' MBE reeks of mawkish, bizarre effrontery to our wartime endeavours."

He died in Canberra, Australia, in 1995 at the age of 79.

== Selected publications ==
- Boldness Be My Friend 1953
- Cape Cold to Cape Hot 1956
- Sequel to Boldness 1959
- Fortune Is My Enemy 1960
- And So Ends the World ... 1961
- No Time to Die 1962
- Cowardice Before Courage 1970
