= Albert Ross Tilley =

Canadian physician (1904–1988)

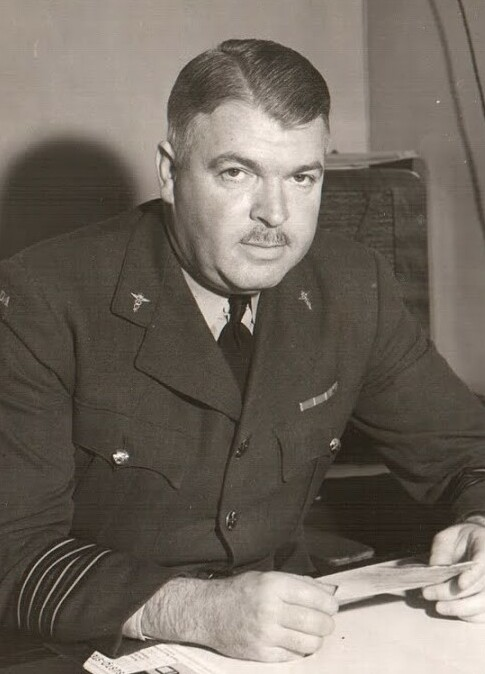
- Ross Tilley, c. 1940s
- Born: November 24, 1904; Bowmanville, Ontario, Canada
- Died: April 19, 1988 (aged 83); Toronto, Ontario, Canada
- Occupation: Plastic surgeon

Albert Ross Tilley, CM OBE (November 24, 1904 – April 19, 1988) was a Canadian plastic surgeon who pioneered the treatment of burned airmen during the Second World War.

== Early years ==
Tilley was born in Bowmanville, Ontario and graduated from the University of Toronto in 1929. He opened a private practice in Toronto at the Toronto Western and Wellesley hospitals in 1935, and was one of the first physicians in Canada to train in plastic surgery.

== Second World War ==
A member of the Canadian Army Medical Corps Militia, he was transferred to the Royal Canadian Air Force (RCAF) Medical Branch at the start of the Second World War and became the Principal Medical Officer in 1941. In 1942, he worked at the Queen Victoria Hospital with Archibald McIndoe where burned airmen were treated. The patients called themselves the Guinea Pig Club. He was made an Officer of the Order of the British Empire in 1944 and was discharged from the RCAF with the rank of Group Captain in 1945.

== Post-war years ==
After the war, he returned to his practice in Toronto and Kingston, Ontario, where he was an assistant professor of surgery. Dr. Tilley was the first to teach plastic surgery at Queen's University. He was a charter member and a past president of the Canadian Society of Plastic Surgeons.

In 1981, he was made a member of the Order of Canada. In 1982, he was made an honorary member of the Canadian Medical Association. In 2006, he was inducted into Canada's Aviation Hall of Fame for "his exceptional skills and radical new medical techniques, his total devotion to the treatment of airmen's burns and reconstruction of deformities, his understanding of the need to treat both the body and the spirit, giving his patients the will and ability to reintegrate into society, have benefited Canada and the world."

The Ross Tilley Burn Centre, currently located at the Sunnybrook Health Sciences Centre, was established in 1984 at the then Wellesley Hospital (since demolished) in downtown Toronto, is named in his honour. In 1998, as part of the Ontario government's healthcare restructuring, the Ross Tilley Burn Centre was moved from what had by then become the Wellesley Central site of St. Michaels' Hospital to the Sunnybrook campus of what was then Sunnybrook & Women's Health Sciences Centre. The Dr Ross Tilley Public School and the Dr. Ross Tilley YMCA and Day Care Centre in Bowmanville, Ontario, and the Ross Tilley Ward in the Queen Victoria Hospital in East Grinstead, England, are all named in his honour.

== Honours and legacy ==
- Order of Canada (1981)
- Honorary member of the Canadian Medical Association (1982)
- Canada's Aviation Hall of Fame (2006)
