= Zinkeisen =

Zinkeisen is a surname. Notable people with the surname include:

- Anna Zinkeisen (1901–1976), Scottish painter and artist
- Doris Zinkeisen (1898–1991), Scottish costume designer, painter, commercial artist, and writer
