= Jackie Mann =

English kidnapping victim (1914-1995)

- Born: 11 June 1914; Northampton, England
- Died: 12 November 1995 (aged 81); Nicosia, Cyprus
- Spouse: Dilys "Sunnie" Pritchard (m. 1943; died 1992)
- Military career
- Allegiance: United Kingdom
- Branch: Royal Air Force
- Service years: 1938–1946
- Rank: Flight Lieutenant
- Units: No. 64 Squadron; No. 92 Squadron; No. 91 Squadron
- Conflicts: Second World War: Battle of Britain
- Awards: Commander of the Order of the British Empire; Distinguished Flying Medal

Jackie Mann, CBE, DFM (11 June 1914 – 12 November 1995) was a Royal Air Force fighter pilot in the Battle of Britain, who in later life was kidnapped by Islamists in Lebanon in May 1989 and held hostage for more than two years.

== RAF career ==
Born in Northampton on 11 June 1914, Mann joined the Royal Air Force Volunteer Reserve in Reading in 1938. As a sergeant pilot (Service No. 127025), he was posted in July 1940 to No. 64 Squadron RAF, flying Spitfires. He was shot down by Royal Navy anti-aircraft fire on 16 August in a friendly fire incident. He was then posted to No. 92 Squadron in late August, and was wounded in action on 14 September. He was subsequently posted to No. 91 Squadron, but on 4 April 1941 was again shot down and wounded, being badly burned. His opponent was either Oberst Adolf Galland or Leut. Robert Menge of JG 26. He underwent plastic surgery at Queen Victoria Hospital, East Grinstead, where he was a founder member of the Guinea Pig Club. He was also awarded a Distinguished Flying Medal.

Mann met his wife Dilys Pritchard – known as "Sunnie" – in wartime London, where Sunnie was an ambulance driver and Mann was recovering from his burns. They married at Chiswick Registry Office in 1943.

Following his recovery, Mann joined 1 ADF at Hendon, and then served with Ferry Command over the North Atlantic routes. His final fighter score was 5 destroyed, 1 probable, and 3 damaged. He was later promoted to the rank of Squadron Leader.

== Post-war life ==
After the war Mann served as Chief Pilot with Middle East Airlines. He and Sunnie moved first to Cyprus and then to Lebanon, where they continued to live for over 40 years. After retiring, Mann ran the Pickwick pub; while Sunnie ran a successful riding school.

== Kidnapping ==
On 13 May 1989, Mann was kidnapped in Beirut by Khalaya al-Kifah al-Musallah or "Armed Struggle Cells", a previously unknown terrorist group linked to the pro-Iranian Shi'ite Muslim militant organisation, Hezbollah.

The group demanded the release of Palestinian prisoners it claimed were being held in Britain, accused of killing Palestinian cartoonist Naji al-Ali in 1987. In fact, no-one linked to the murder was being held by UK authorities.

The British embassy had warned three days before Mann was seized that a Shi'a group was preparing to take another Western hostage. The Foreign Office and embassy had renewed warnings to British citizens still living in Beirut to leave immediately following the Salman Rushdie affair in February of that year.

In September 1989, it was reported that his wife Sunnie had been told that Mann was dead, by a man who asked to meet her in a Beirut shopping centre.

== Release ==
Mann was eventually released on 24 September 1991, following 865 days in captivity, after negotiations by the British and US governments succeeded in bringing about the release of several Western hostages. He had been held at the same time as other UK and Irish hostages in Lebanon, notably journalist John McCarthy, church envoy Terry Waite and author Brian Keenan.

On his release, he was taken firstly to Damascus, Syria, where he was reunited with his wife, and then flown by VC10 to RAF Lyneham in Wiltshire, and spent some time recuperating and debriefing in the Officers' Mess, before returning to normal life. His health had suffered greatly during his captivity, and he never recovered. He had been kept for prolonged periods in solitary confinement, sometimes in chains. He lost over 18 kilograms in weight, and experienced heart and lung problems. He also suffered from a skin problem, requiring medication, resulting from his Second World War burns injuries.

After his release, the Manns settled in Nicosia, Cyprus. Jackie was appointed a Commander of the Order of the British Empire in 1992.

The couple wrote a book in 1992 entitled Yours Till The End: Harrowing Life of a Beirut Hostage. Sunnie also wrote Holding On in 1991.

Sunnie Mann died in November 1992 from lung cancer. Jackie Mann died in Nicosia on 12 November 1995. He was 81 years old.

== See also ==
- List of kidnappings
- List of solved missing person cases
