= ROF Blackburn =

Coordinates: 53.7212°N 2.4626°W

Royal Ordnance Factory, ROF, Blackburn was part of the Ministry of Defence organisations producing components for the manufacture of armaments and arms related equipment from the late 1930 until after WWII. Commonly known locally as the "Fuse" or "Fuze", because the majority of components in production related to the fuse mechanisms used on most explosive devices at the time, bombs.

Providing local employment, the factory was known as a good employer and provided one of the best and respected apprenticeship schemes in the region.

== World War II ==
Along with mass production of fuse mechanisms, it also developed Safety and Arming Mechanisms, S&A Units for many more of the sophisticated weapons in development during and after World War II. These S&A units provided safe handling for missiles whilst under transit conditions and safety for operator personnel up to the time of having to be armed. Bombs and missiles need specific launch conditions to be fulfilled to stop injury and fatalities to handlers during pre-launch.

Most well known missiles from the UK after World War II had S&A units from ROF Blackburn, including Blue Streak, and other weapons used during the Falklands Crisis.

During the Second World War over 5,000 worked at ROF.

The brochure gives a fascinating snippet into life at ROF immediately after the war reporting that between 1946 and 1948 the factory produced over one million alarm clock movements before production once again switched back to the large-scale manufacture of mechanical fuses.

Women were a key to the factory’s prodigious output. During the war around 3,500 women worked there producing 15,000 fuses every week, working 50-hour weeks.

== Post-war ==
By 1957, the workforce was predominantly female with over 700 of them on the production lines and more than 250 involved in inspecting completed orders.

The photos show the factory to be a combination of heavy industrial processes and delicate, precision engineering with row upon row of desks, each with their own task lighting as more and more electronics were introduced into the manufacturing process.

Hundreds of jobs were lost due to the corruption of Gordon Foxley, the Director of Ammunition Procurement at the Ministry of Defence from 1981 to 1984, who accepted bribes to award contracts to competitors of ROF Blackburn. In 1994, an estimate of the total cost of his corruption included almost £30 million in losses to ROF Blackburn.

The Member of Parliament for Blackburn, Jack Straw, described the effect of the job losses on Blackburn as “devastating”.
