= Foxley =

Foxley may refer to:

== Places ==
- Foxley, Glasgow, Scotland
- Foxley, Herefordshire, England
- Foxley, Norfolk, England
- Foxley, Staffordshire, England
- Foxley, Wiltshire, England
- Foxley River, Prince Edward Island, Canada

== Other uses ==
- Foxley (surname)
- Operation Foxley, a plan to assassinate Adolf Hitler

== See also ==
- Foxley-Norris
- "Galloping Foxley"
