= Geoffrey Page =

British military aviator (1920–2000)

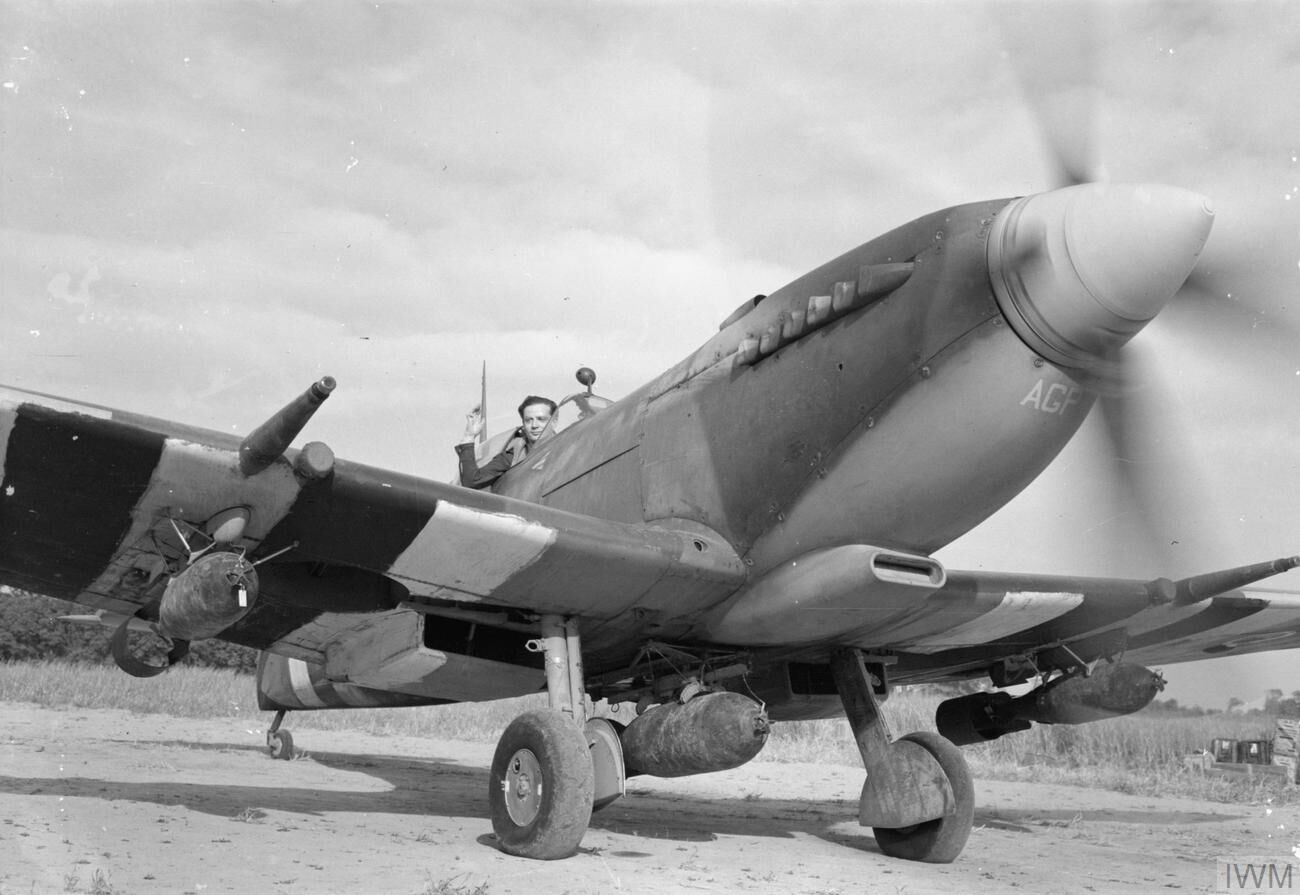
- Page, in his Spitfire Mk. IX, about to take off on a sortie from Longues-sur-Mer, Normandy (1944)
- Born: 16 May 1920; Boxmoor, England
- Died: 3 August 2000 (aged 80); Wokingham, Berkshire, England
- Spouse: Pauline Bruce (m. 1946–2000)
- Relatives: Sir Frederick Handley Page (uncle)
- Military career
- Allegiance: United Kingdom
- Branch: Royal Air Force
- Service years: 1939–1946
- Rank: Wing commander
- Commands: No. 125 Wing RAF; No. 132 Squadron RAF
- Conflicts: Second World War: European theatre; Battle of Britain; Invasion of Normandy; Battle of Arnhem
- Awards: Distinguished Service Order; Officer of the Order of the British Empire; Distinguished Flying Cross & Bar; Officer of the Order of Orange Nassau (Netherlands)
- Other work: Salesman with the British Aircraft Corporation; Founder of the Battle of Britain Trust

Wing Commander Alan Geoffrey Page, DSO, OBE, DFC & Bar (16 May 1920 – 3 August 2000), known as Geoffrey Page, was an officer in the Royal Air Force who served during the Second World War. He participated in the Battle of Britain, and was shot down. He was badly burned when his aircraft was destroyed, but survived. He underwent many surgeries on his way to recovery, and was a founding member of the Guinea Pig Club. He eventually passed a medical exam and returned to active service, becoming one of Britain's most successful fighter pilots.

== Early life ==
Page was born on 16 May 1920 in Boxmoor, England. His parents divorced while he was very young. He had developed an interest in aviation by age 5, which intensified as he grew into a young man. Page was educated at Dean Close School, Cheltenham. For his college studies, his desire was to go to the RAF college at Cranwell and make a career of the RAF. His father strongly opposed a career in the air force, and pressed him to pursue a career in engineering instead. His father's brother, the engineer and aircraft manufacturer, Sir Frederick Handley Page, aided in discouraging him, telling him that pilots were plentiful but engineers were not. Thinking of it later in life, Page suspected they discouraged him because they had suffered the loss of their brother, who had been a fighter pilot in the Great War.

Complying with his father's wishes, he went to London to pursue engineering at the Imperial College. While there, he joined the University Air Squadron, which flew training aircraft out of Northolt. By the end of his second year of studies he had become a competent pilot.

== Second World War ==
=== Flight training and the Battle of Britain ===
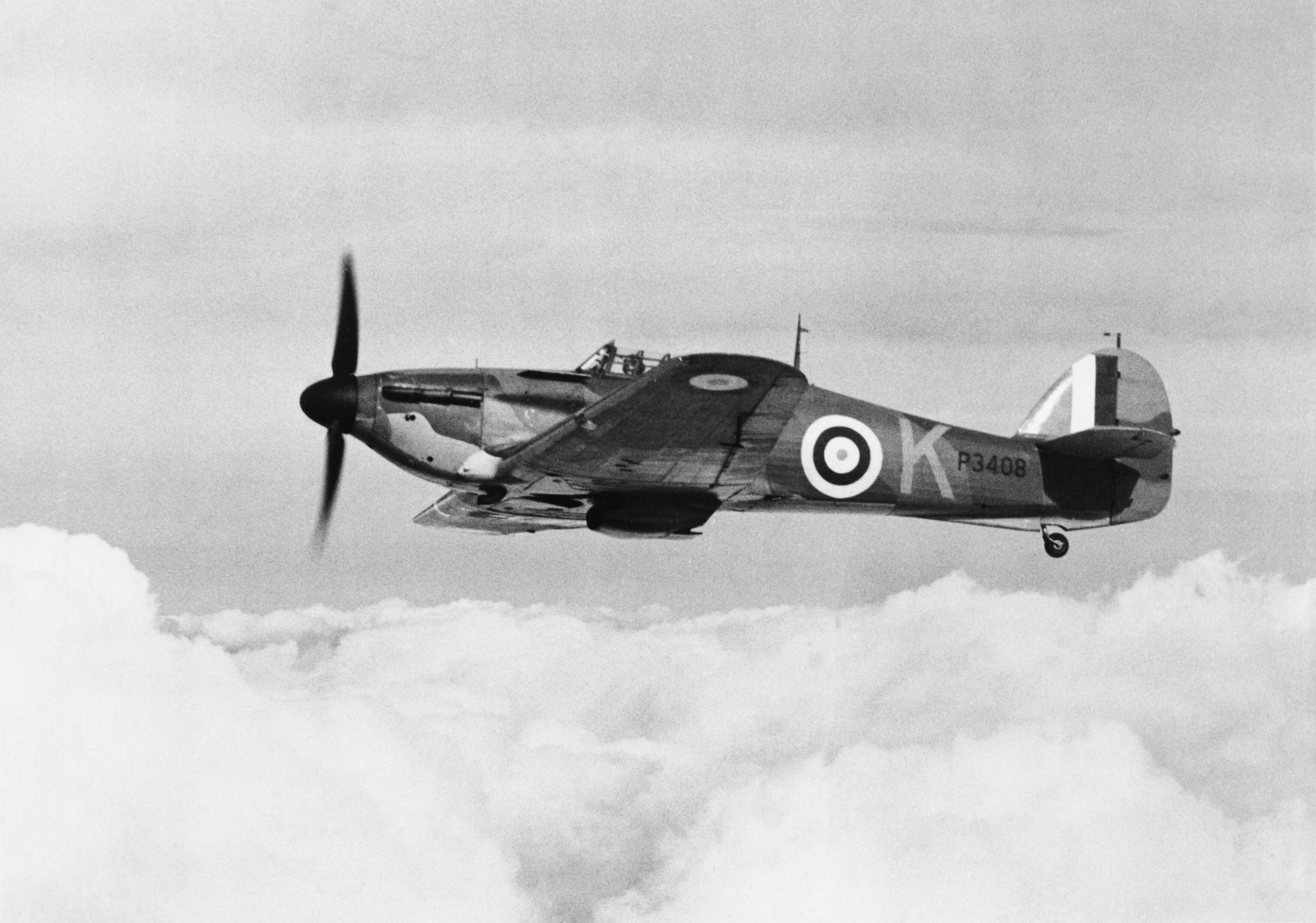
Hawker Hurricane Mk I

Two weeks after the outbreak of the Second World War, Page received his call-up papers and joined the RAF with the rank of acting pilot officer. He received his Initial and Advanced flight training at Cranwell, where he earned a rating of "exceptional". He had always wanted to be a fighter pilot, and chose Fighter Command as the air service he desired to be assigned to, while declining to indicate a secondary choice. To his great disappointment, he was assigned to be an instructor at a flight training school. However, with the German invasion of the Low Countries in May 1940 the Air Ministry changed its mind and he was posted to No. 66 Squadron RAF, flying Spitfires. With no training on advanced fighters, he and another young pilot were worked up on Spitfires and gained operational status while at 66 Squadron. Before he could fly combat with 66 Squadron, it was discovered that there had been a typo in orders. Page and the other new pilot were supposed to be at 56 Squadron, flying Hurricanes. The two pilots traveled to RAF North Weald in southern England to join 56 Squadron. The squadron had been in France and suffered losses there. When Page arrived the squadron was away training at RAF Digby. He checked out on the Hurricane and was made operational by the time the squadron returned. The squadron ended the campaign by covering the Dunkirk evacuation.

Initially disappointed to be transferred from a squadron flying Spitfires to one flying Hurricanes, his misgivings were soon dispelled. Describing his first flight, Page offered "The Hurricane rose gracefully and easily into the air, and I had the immediate sensation that here was a lady with very few vices." He found the cockpit layout similar, and it was easier to see over the nose of the aircraft, making taxiing and takeoffs less troublesome. In addition, the Merlin engine in the Hurricane was cooled more reliably while on the ground, which meant he no longer had to worry about overheating the glycol when taxiing and preparing to take off. Retracting the wheels was far easier, as in the Hurricane the function was motorised, whereas in the Spitfire the pilot had to work a hand screw. The Hurricane did not have the speed of the Spitfire, but handled very well, was more rugged and could tolerate more battle damage. Page found himself happy to fly either aircraft. He looked upon the Hurricane as akin to a bulldog, whereas the Spitfire he viewed more as a greyhound.

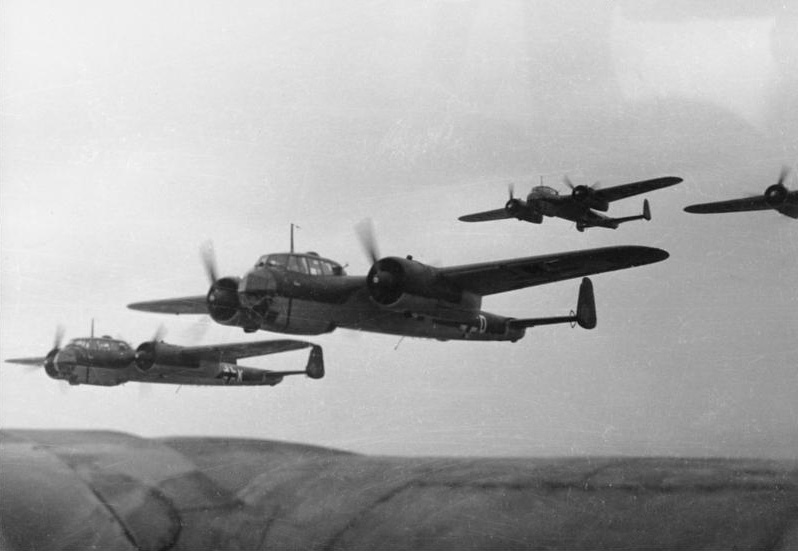
A formation of Dornier Do 17s in 1940

Late summer found the squadron heavily involved in the Battle of Britain. The short notice scrambles and constant flying made for an exhausting existence. It was a life lived day to day, marked by occasional victories, the loss of comrades and evening trips to the local public house. On 13 July Page claimed an "He 113" shot down (probably a Bf 109, as the He 113 never saw action) and on 20 July claimed a third share in a reconnaissance Junkers Ju 88 of 4(F)/122, the crew becoming POWs. On 25 July his squadron was called to the aid of a group of MTBs engaged with German E-boats off Dover. Two destroyers were sent to help as well. Meanwhile, the Luftwaffe sent a flight of Ju 87s with fighter escorts. Page's squadron arrived over the ships almost the same time as the German dive bombers. Following them down he was credited with the destruction of a Ju 87.

On 12 August 1940 Page and his squadron were scrambled to intercept a group of German aircraft. Page was flying Hurricane serial P2970. Sighting a large formation of Dornier Do 17 bombers, the squadron's commander closed to attack the formation. Page followed him in, firing upon the formation as his leader pulled away. As he pressed his attack his aircraft was hit several times, and was set afire when the header tank was ruptured. High-octane fuel ignited and spewed into the cockpit, covering Page while he attempted to release from his harness and bail out. His uncovered hands and face were badly burnt. As he descended in his parachute he was sickened by the smell of his own burnt flesh. Landing in the channel he managed to get free of his parachute and stay afloat until he was picked up by the boat of a small merchant ship. It marked the end of his initial flying career.

=== Hospitalisation and rehabilitation ===
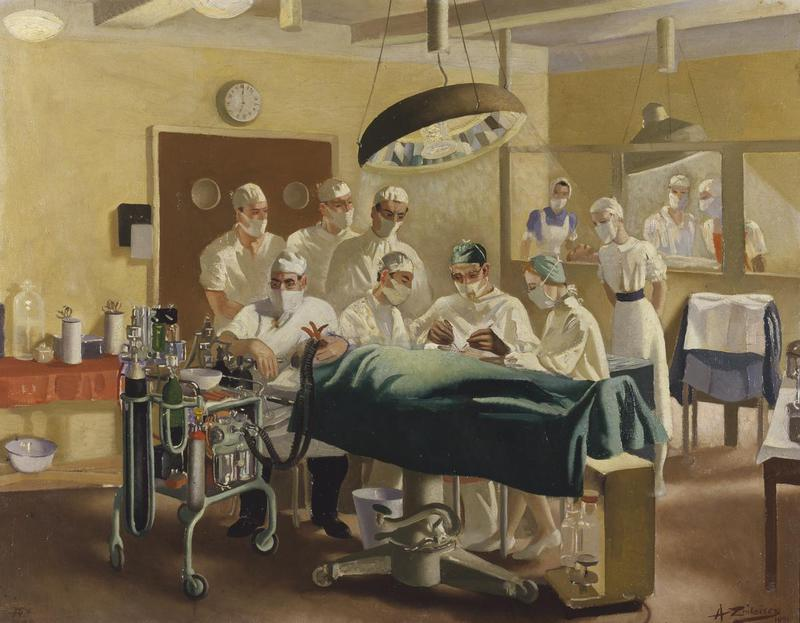
Painting depicting Archibald McIndoe operating at East Grinstead

After being picked up from the icy sea in near-mortal agony, he was taken to the burns unit at Queen Victoria Hospital in East Grinstead. Both of his hands were burnt down to the bone, and his head was badly swollen. Page had also sustained bullet wounds to both legs. In convalescence scar tissue formed over his hands and contracted, making his hands largely useless. He was referred to Archibald McIndoe, who was confident he could help, though it would take a bit of work. It meant a series of surgeries and recoveries, and an ongoing battle with the pain of recovery. Page formed friendships with the patients of the burn unit. Most of them were fliers from the Royal Air Force. They were young men facing physical disfigurement, loss of dexterity, and a great deal of pain. A fellowship formed among the burn patients. In time they formed a drinking club of sorts. Page was a founding member. They called their association the Guinea Pig Club. The name of the club was chosen to reflect the experimental nature of the plastic surgery techniques being developed for the reconstructive work carried out on burn patients at East Grinstead. Mclndoe himself was elected life president and Page was the first chairman. Page recorded the minutes of the first meeting. Wrote Page: "The objects of the club are to promote good fellowship among, and to maintain contact with, approved frequenters of Queen Victoria Cottage Hospital."

Due to the burn injuries sustained to his hands, it was thought Page no longer possessed the hand strength to fly an airplane, let alone handle a fighter in a dogfight. Furthermore, McIndoe felt Page had done his part, and strongly discouraged him from returning to active service. Page was determined to return. He went through a series of operations to remove the scar tissue restricting the use of his hands. He also underwent reconstructions to his face and eyelids. The process meant enduring a great deal of pain. His anger over it initially was directed against the health staff, but soon became focused on the Germans. He promised himself to shoot down an enemy aircraft for each of the operations he had to endure. At the time of his accident he had been credited with 2 1/2 victories. As time went on and his operation log lengthened, the total number of German aircraft rose to a disconcerting number.

In 1942, after 15 operations, Page succeeded in gaining limited-flight permission. Returning to make his first flight, Page was seized with the fear that he would become trapped in a burning aircraft. The ground crew waited patiently, and his flight instructor was confused by his hesitation, asking if Page could hear him, and was the R/T working. Page forced himself forward, and soon the problems of flying the aircraft pushed his fears to the side. Three months later he was granted full operational status.

=== Return to Fighter Command ===
Page was assigned to No. 132 Squadron RAF at RAF Martlesham Heath as a supernumerary flight lieutenant. At the time the squadron's main duty was flying convoy patrols. Though he had returned to fly Spitfires, he was disappointed in not being able to engage in air combat. A call was made for volunteers to fly in North Africa, and Page took this opportunity to get back into combat flying. Once there the heat of the African sun proved too hard on his grafts, and after 3 months he requested a return to the UK. Page was posted to the Air Fighting Development Unit (AFDU) at Wittering. The unit was set up to compare aircraft types, Allied and German.

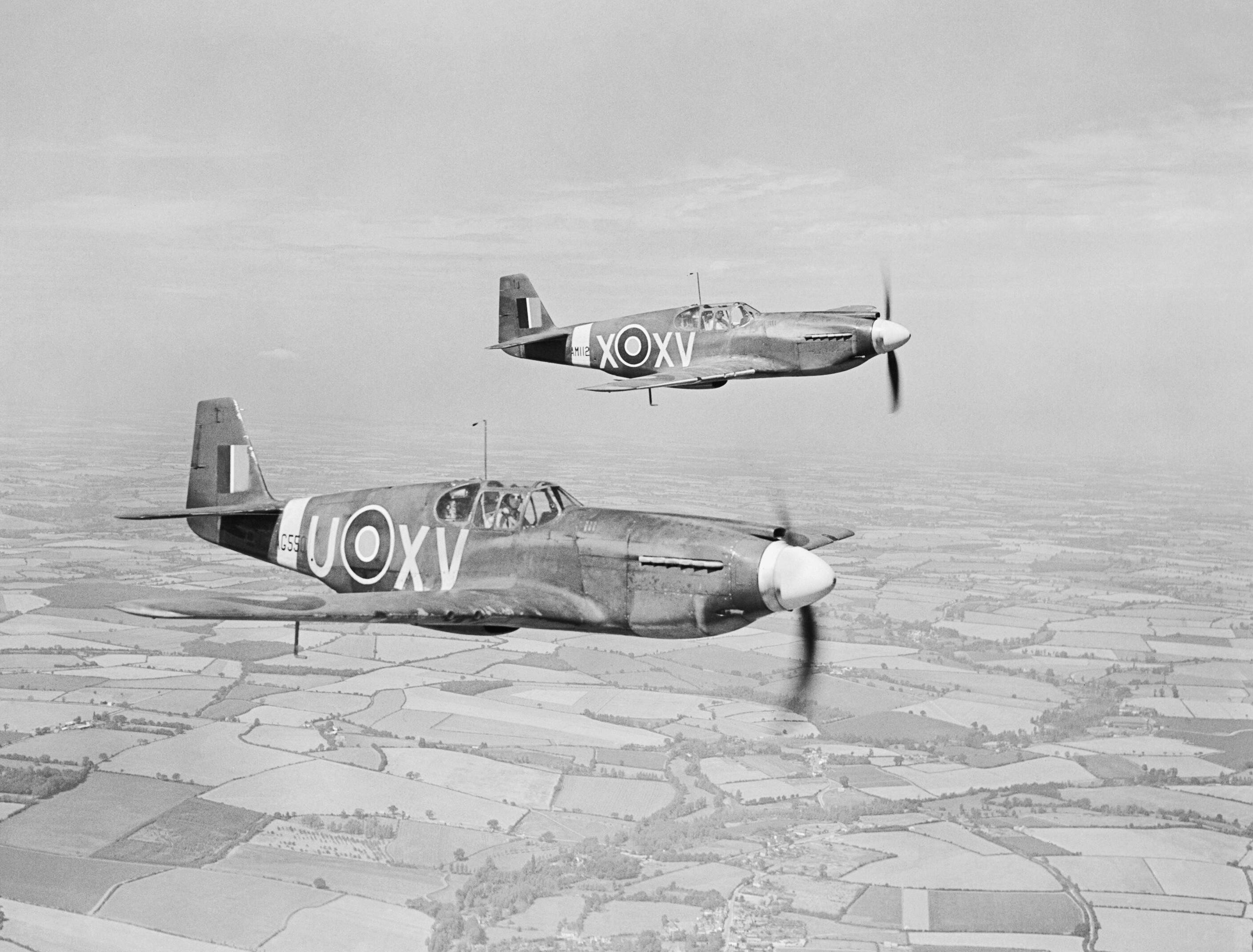
A pair of early Mustangs in service with the RAF. MacLachlan directed the Mustangs be painted solid dark green, and flew them at tree top height

While at the Air Fighting Development Unit Page met Squadron Leader James MacLachlan, a pilot who had lost his left arm after an air-battle over Malta in 1941. Like Page, he had overcome his disability and returned to fly operationally. The AFDU had in their inventory an Allison powered North American Mustang Mark I. MacLachlan came up with the idea of flying an early morning solo low level patrol over occupied France to attack unsuspecting German aircraft from below as they returned to base. His first effort was unsuccessful, but on returning Page asked to try himself. Encouraged by the interest, MacLachlan seized upon the idea of using two aircraft. They set about acquiring a second Mustang, and waited for the correct weather to allow their mission to succeed. On their first sortie south of Paris on 29 June 1943, the pair accounted for six enemy aircraft in ten minutes; three Hs 126 reconnaissance aircraft of JG 105, along with a Ju 88 of KG 6. Page was awarded the Distinguished Flying Cross for this action. On their second attempt on 18 July MacLachlan's aircraft was hit as they crossed the coast and he had to make a crash landing. He subsequently died of the injuries he sustained in the crash. Page returned to East Grinstead to remove further scar tissue from one of his hands, and spent several weeks recuperating there.

Late in 1943 Page joined No. 122 Squadron RAF as a flight commander. He was there only briefly when in January 1944 the commanding officer of 132 Squadron was killed while returning from a sortie over France. Page was ordered to take over command. 132 Squadron was sent to Scotland to rest while Page was sent to join a group of flight and squadron commanders who had been gathered at RAF Milfield to do special training in ground attack. After rejoining 132 Squadron in Scotland the remainder of the rest passed quickly, and the squadron was posted to RAF Ford. There Page trained the squadron in dive bombing, and they put the skill to use attacking V-1 sites in the Calais region. On 29 April Page led a flight from his squadron on an afternoon sweep across the Netherlands. A Bf 110 was spotted below them. Page's flight attacked, but as the first Spitfire flew past its target it came under the guns of the twin 30 mm cannons of the night fighter, was set fire and crashed into the ground. The German aircraft happened to be flown by Experte Major Hans-Joachim Jabs of NJG 1, who had taken the aircraft up on a test flight prior to that evening's operations. Caught out, he immediately tried to get down to his nearby airfield at Deelen in Gelderland. A second Spitfire attempted a head-on attack, but it too was hit by the heavy guns of the Messerschmitt and crash-landed in a grassy field. Coming over the airfield, flak harassed the Spitfires, but Page managed to put several hits on the airplane as Jabs made a hard landing and escaped, with his crew.

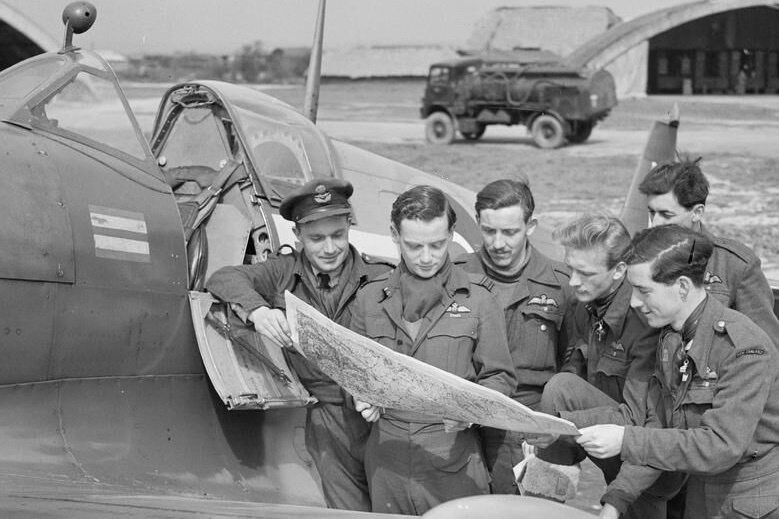
Page and a group of his pilots at Ford, April 1944

In June the long-awaited invasion of occupied Europe arrived. Page and his squadron were tasked with providing air superiority over the invasion convoy and beaches. At age 24 he felt an old man compared to the young pilots around him. He anticipated a bloody air fight with the Luftwaffe over the beaches of Normandy, but this never materialised. After a week his squadron was transferred to a newly set up airfield in Normandy. Their air time now was centred on ground support attacks. The dust of the dirt field tended to get into the machinery and occasionally caused their guns to jam. This worked as an excuse Page used to take his aircraft out with one or two companions to do "gun checks", resulting in many strafing attacks on German traffic and occasional air fights.

In September 1944 Page and his squadron were operating from a forward airfield flying ground support missions for the 1st Airborne Division at the Battle of Arnhem. On a late afternoon sortie Page's aircraft was hit from ground fire and its ailerons damaged. Not realising the extent of the damage, Page came in to land and was unable to adequately check his speed. He struck the middle of the runway hard and the aeroplane broke up. Page's face struck the gun-sight with enough force to break it free from its mounting, and he suffered a fracture to one of his vertebra as well. Page had to be taken from the wreck on a stretcher, and lost consciousness shortly after being pulled out.

Page was again sent back to McIndoe for a further operation. By this time Page had reached his goal of 15 "kills" (10 solo, 5 shared, and 3 damaged). In addition, he had been awarded the Distinguished Service Order and twice awarded the Distinguished Flying Cross. Later he was made an Officer of the Order of Orange Nassau by Wilhelmina, Queen of The Netherlands for his part in the Battle of Arnhem. The citation for his DSO read, in part: "Apart from his individual exploits, Wing Commander Page has infused the entire wing with his fighting spirit. Under his command 60 enemy aircraft have been destroyed."

After Page was released from hospital in early 1945 he was sent on a lecture tour of the United States to boost Anglo-American relations. The trip brought him to Los Angeles, where he was adopted by those members of the film industry with British roots. He was taken about town with Joan Fontaine, and was pressed to stay at the home of Nigel Bruce and his wife Violet. He became good friends with C. Aubrey Smith and Herbert Marshall.

In the spring of 1945 Page underwent further surgery before being attached to Vickers-Armstrongs as a test pilot. He returned to England just as Germany surrendered. He was discharged from the RAF in 1946, having achieved the acting rank of wing commander. Later that same year he was accepted into the RAF as a regular officer, with the permanent rank of flight lieutenant.

== Life after the war ==
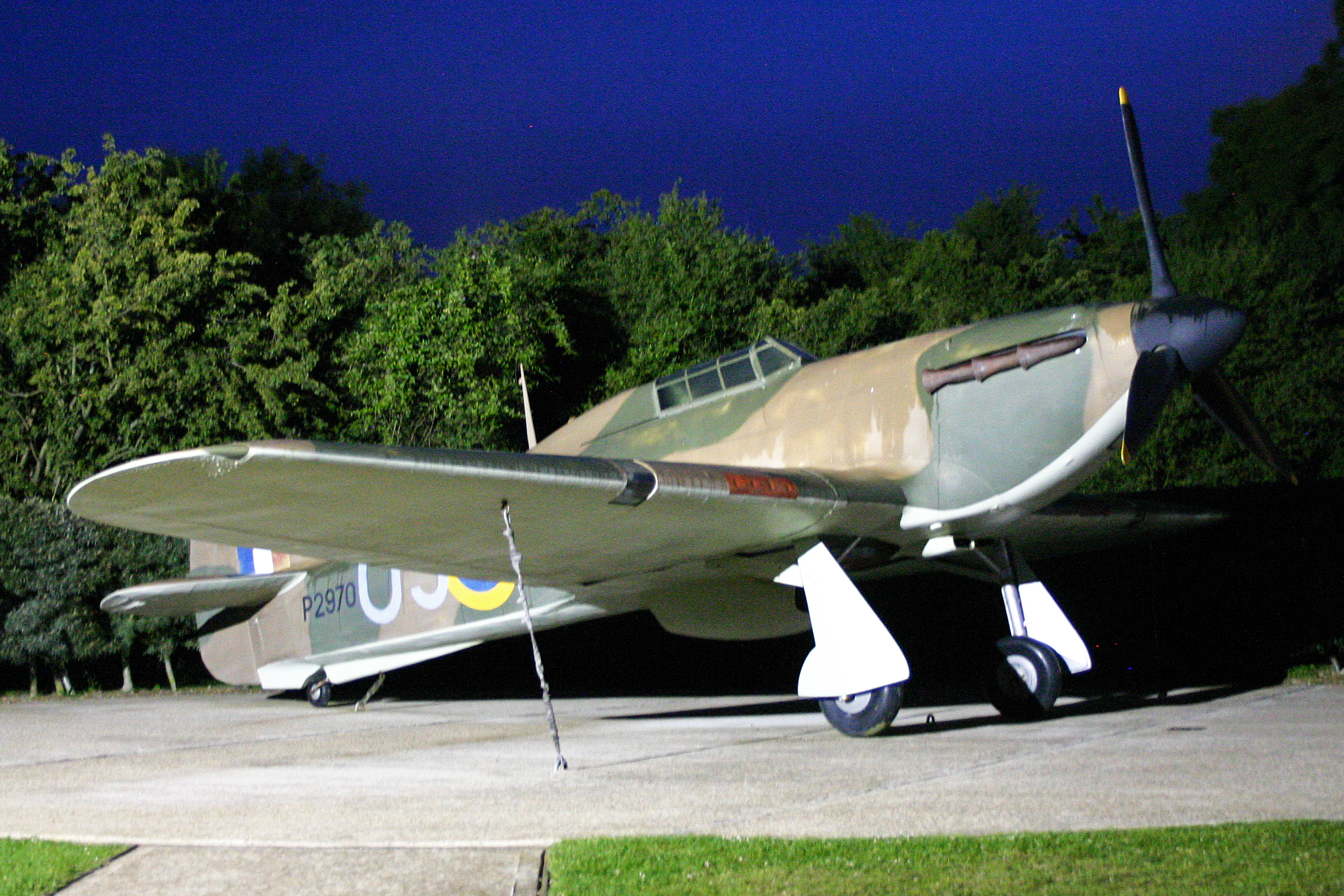
A Hawker Hurricane replica, painted to represent P2970, the aircraft in which Page was shot down, Kent Battle of Britain Museum, 2011

In 1946 Page married Pauline Bruce, daughter of actor Nigel Bruce. The ceremony was held in California, with C. Aubrey Smith acting as best man.

Page was made commanding officer of No. 64 Squadron RAF, flying the de Havilland Hornet fighter. In 1947 he was appointed personal assistant to Sir Guy Garrod, the senior RAF officer at the United Nations Military Staff Committee in New York. In 1948 he resigned his commission with the RAF and took a job with Vickers-Armstrongs as a sales executive. Later he worked as an aviation consultant internationally, with his home base in Switzerland.

In retirement, as well as remaining the driving force of the Guinea Pig Club, Page founded the Battle of Britain Trust. This raised more than £1 million, with which the Battle of Britain memorial was erected overlooking the Straits of Dover, to commemorate those who kept Nazi Germany at bay. He was created an Officer of the Order of the British Empire in 1995 for his efforts.

In 1981 Page published his autobiography, titled Tale of a Guinea Pig. The book carried the dedication "To Archie McIndoe, whose surgeon's fingers gave me back my pilot's hands." In 1999 a revised edition was released, titled Shot Down in Flames.

Geoffrey Page died on 3 August 2000, survived by his wife Pauline, his daughter and two sons.

== Awards ==
- United Kingdom: Distinguished Flying Cross 30 July 1943 (Note: Citation reads: "Recently, these officers in the course of an operation over enemy occupied territory shot down 6 enemy aircraft, 3 of which were destroyed by Squadron Leader MacLachlan and 2 by Flight Lieutenant Page, while the other was destroyed jointly. The operation, which was planned by Squadron Leader MacLachlan, was brilliantly executed and the successes were worthily earned".)
- United Kingdom: Distinguished Flying Cross 22 August 1944 (Note: Citation reads: "On 7th July, 1944, this officer took part in an engagement against a force of more than 30 enemy aircraft, 6 of which were shot down without loss. In this spirited fight, Squadron Leader Page led his formation with skill and determination and one of the enemy's aircraft fell to his guns. He has destroyed 10 hostile aircraft". Note: The second DFC was awarded as a bar for the ribbon of the first DFC.)
- United Kingdom: Distinguished Service Order 29 December 1944 (Note: Citation reads: "Since the award of a bar to the D.F.C this officer has operated most successfully as wing commander (operations) with his wing during the campaign in France, In this period he has destroyed three enemy aircraft, and damaged others, apart from causing much damage to enemy fighting and transport vehicles. On two occasions in July, 1944, while on cannon test, he encountered upwards of 50 aircraft. Each time, he attacked without hesitation and shot down one of the enemy. On the second occasion he was wounded by a cannon shell, but flew safely to base, Later in October, 1944, he sustained severe injuries when his aircraft crashed after being damaged by anti-aircraft fire. Apart from his individual exploits, Wing Cdr. Page, has infused the entire wing with his own fighting spirit. Under his command 60 enemy aircraft have been destroyed together with a large number of transport vehicles and tanks. This splendid achievement, has been largely due to the brilliant leadership of Wing Cdr. Page.")
- Netherlands: Officer of the Order of Orange Nassau (Netherlands) 23 January 1948
- United Kingdom: Officer of the Order of the British Empire 17 June 1995 (Note: Citation reads: "Awarded for his efforts to found the Battle of Britain Trust. Page raised more than £1 million, with which the Battle of Britain memorial was erected overlooking the Straits of Dover, to commemorate those who kept Nazi Germany at bay.")
