= Foxley (surname) =

Foxley is a surname. Notable people with the surname include:

- Alejandro Foxley (born 1939), Chilean economist and politician
- Barbara Foxley (1860-1958), British academic and suffragist
- Gordon Foxley (20th century), head of defence procurement at the Ministry of Defence of the United Kingdom
- Ray Foxley (1928–2002), English jazz pianist
- Thomas Foxley (c.1305 – 1360), English MP from Berkshire
- Bill Foxley (1923–2010), World War II pilot
