= Raman Malhotra =

British ophthalmologist

Raman Malhotra is a British ophthalmologist and oculoplastic surgeon. He is a consultant ophthalmic surgeon and former head of the Corneoplastic unit, Queen Victoria Hospital, East Grinstead.

== Education and early career ==
Born on 13 September 1968 at Isleworth, Middlesex, UK, Malhotra attended Hazelwick School, Crawley. He graduated in medicine and surgery from the University of Bristol in 1993 and was a demonstrator in anatomy at the university from 1994 to 1995. Having finished his basic surgical ophthalmic training at The Western Eye Hospital, London, he went on to complete his higher surgical training in Oxford. He was a Fellow in oculoplastic, orbital and lacrimal surgery at the Royal Adelaide Hospital and Women and Children's Hospital, Adelaide, Australia from 2002 to 2003. In 2003 he was appointed as consultant ophthalmic and oculoplastic surgeon at the Queen Victoria Hospital, East Grinstead.

== Developments ==
Malhotra has developed two instruments used in endoscopic dacryocystorhinostomy (DCR):

- The Malhotra endonasal nibbler
- The Malhotra endonasal punch

The nibbler reduces the need for powered instruments such as drills and burrs during endonasal DCR and is estimated therefore to save £100 in costs for each procedure.

In 2005, Malhotra was heavily involved in a case that was given considerable international coverage. Sundeep Hunjan, then 23, was attacked with acid on her way home in Nairobi. She suffered extensive burns, including loss of her eyelids. She was operated on at the specialist McIndoe Surgical Centre in East Grinstead, where Malhotra rebuilt her upper and lower eyelids. There is a happy ending. After some two years of treatment, she made a full recovery and in 2007 married Amritpal Singh Rupra. In May 2010, she gave birth to a boy.

In 2007, Malhotra received the American Academy of Ophthalmology Achievement Award.

In 2008, Malhotra created a method of treating Blepharospasm using filters.

In 2008, 2009 and 2010, Malhotra was cited in the Tatler Beauty & Cosmetic Surgery Guides as one of Britain's top cosmetic surgeons

In 2010, Malhotra helped evolve the technique of ptosis (droopy eyelid) surgery and reported a technique (a less disruptive modification of previously described techniques) in the British Journal of Ophthalmology and The Open Ophthalmology Journal.

Malhotra sits on the editorial board of Orbit, the international journal of the European Society of Ophthalmic, Plastic and Reconstructive Surgery. In August 2011, he was appointed a section editor of the British Journal of Ophthalmology.

In September 2011, Malhotra received a Bronze National Clinical Excellence Award.

In 2013, Malhotra developed the Malhotra platinum segment chain for improving eyelid closure in facial palsy.

In 2014, Malhotra developed the CADS Ophthalmic Grading score for facial palsy. This is a method to standardise grading of severity of ophthalmic involvement in facial palsy.

In February 2015, Malhotra received The Koornneef Award from the Dutch Orbital Society.

Also in 2015, Malhotra reported on the post-levator aponeurosis fat pad, a layer of fat in the eyelid not previously recognised by anatomy textbooks.

In late 2015, Malhotra was awarded a Silver National Clinical Excellence Award by the Advisory Committee on Clinical Excellence Awards at the Department of Health.

== Journals and authorship ==
Malhotra has written two textbooks:

- Eye Essentials: Cataract Assessment, Classification and Management, ISBN 0-08-044977-8 Butterworth Heinemann. Sales by October 2009: >1,500
- Revision in Sciences Basic to Ophthalmology, ISBN 0-340-67678-7 Hodder Arnold October 1997. Sales: unknown. Recommended by the Canadian Journal of Ophthalmology ("This book should be considered a must for any resident approaching his or her qualifying examinations."), Vol 33, No 6, 1998.

He has authored numerous book chapters and 105 refereed articles in international medical and scientific journals.
