= Bill Foxley =

British RAF officer (1923–2010)

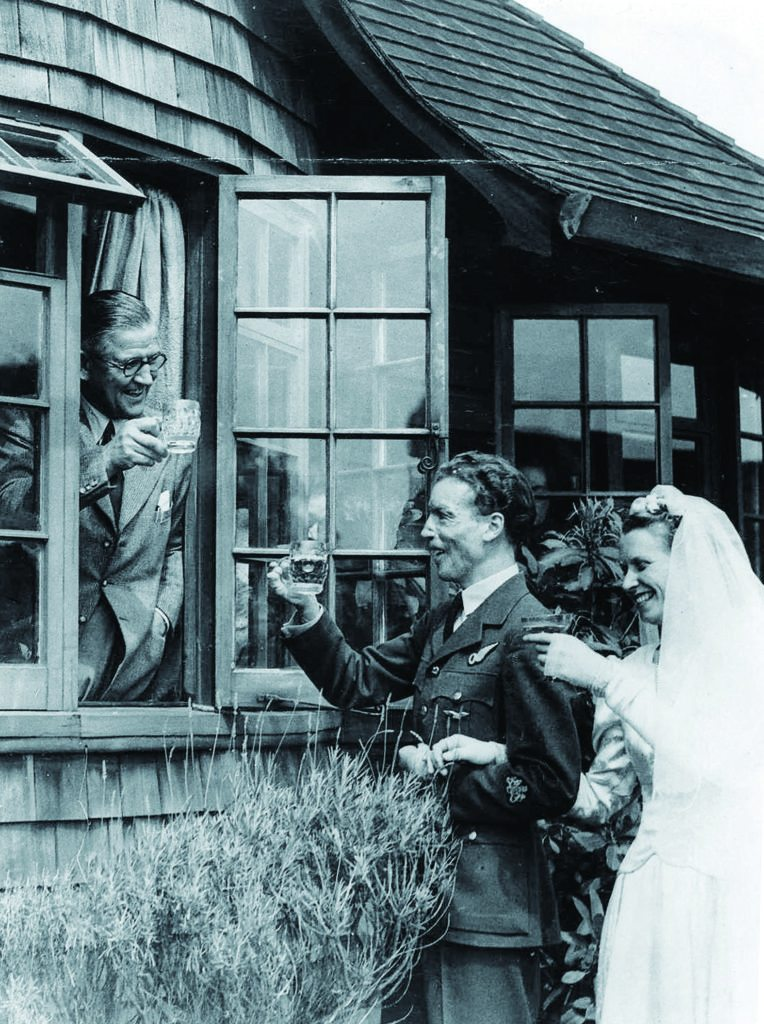
WO1 Bill Foxley and his new wife, Catherine Arkell. His rank of WO1 and his trade badge for Observer is clearly visible in the photo.

Warrant Officer Class I William Geoffrey Foxley (17 August 1923 – 5 December 2010) was a Observer with RAF Bomber Command Pathfinder Force during World War II who suffered severe burns following a crash. He was notable for the support he gave to other burns victims and for a film appearance that gave awareness of the facial burns suffered by World War II aircrew to a wide audience.

== Early life and World War II ==
Foxley was born in Liverpool and he joined the Royal Air Force in 1942. On 16 March 1944 he was 20 years old and close to completing his training as an observer with No 28 Operational Training Unit at RAF Castle Donington. His Vickers Wellington bomber took off at 23:19 on a training flight, but within a minute the flaps dropped down fully at an altitude of 200 feet (60 Metres) causing the nose to pitch up and the aircraft then stalled and crashed. He escaped from the blazing aircraft without injury but then returned to help the wireless operator. He suffered severe burns to his face and hands exiting the burning aircraft through the astrodome on top of the fuselage and the airman he tried to rescue did not survive.

Foxley was put under the care of consultant plastic surgeon Sir Archibald McIndoe at Queen Victoria Hospital, East Grinstead where he underwent 29 operations to his face and hands. These Included the tubed pedicle procedure which involved cutting a flap of skin from a normally hidden part of the body such as a thigh and then sewing its long edges together to form a tube. The other end of the tube was attached closer to the face to which the pedicle was eventually attached directly. On leaving hospital he was blind in his right eye, still suffering pain from his injuries and had impaired vision in his left eye due to a damaged cornea. He retired from the RAF in 1947 at the rank of Warrant Officer Class I.

== Later life ==
Foxley lived in Devon and then in Surrey where he was near to East Grinstead hospital for further treatment and he worked in facilities management at the Central Electricity Generating Board. In 1969 he appeared in the film Battle of Britain (1969) as a pilot holding the rank of Squadron Leader, with facial burns in a scene with Kenneth More and Susannah York. He was a member of the Guinea Pig Club and gave support to burns victims from subsequent conflicts. He said he often had an empty seat next to him on his train journeys to work as people would move away when they saw his face and hands. He usually then greeted them with "I don't bite, you know". He also set up a charity called Disablement in the City.

== Photo gallery ==
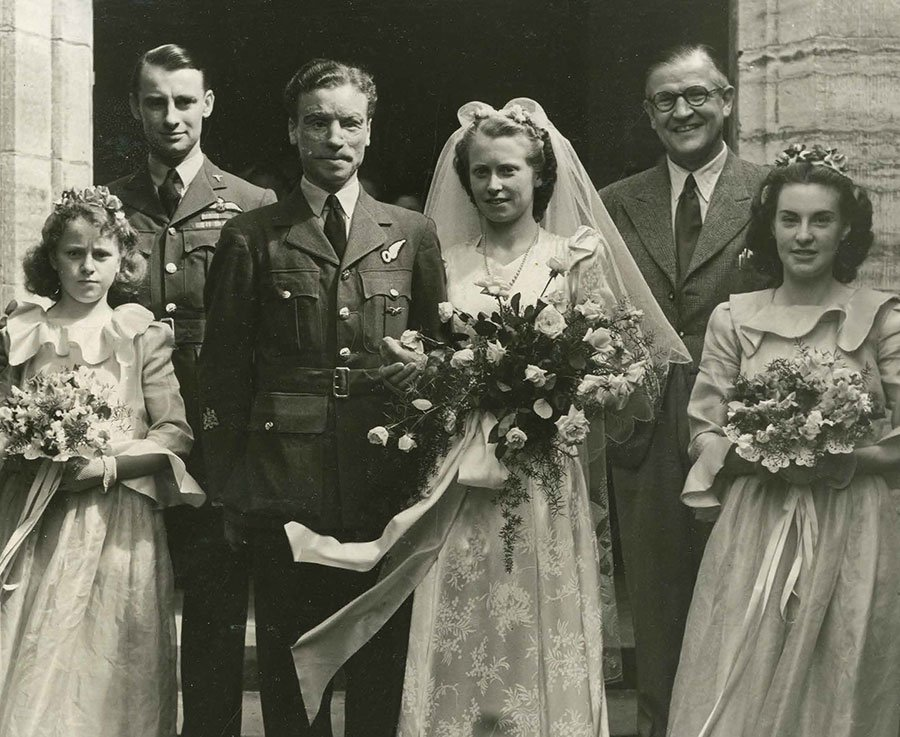
WO1 Bill Foxley, RAF Observer, and his wife, Catherine, on their wedding day, 1947. His rank of Warrant Officer Class I and his Observer's wing is clearly visible.

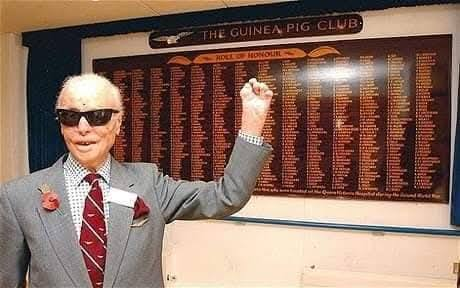
Bill Foxley with Guinea Pig Club memorial, early 2000s

== Filmography ==
Year	Title	Role	Notes
1969	Battle of Britain	Squadron Leader Evans	
