= Walking-stalk skin flap =

Reconstructive surgery technique

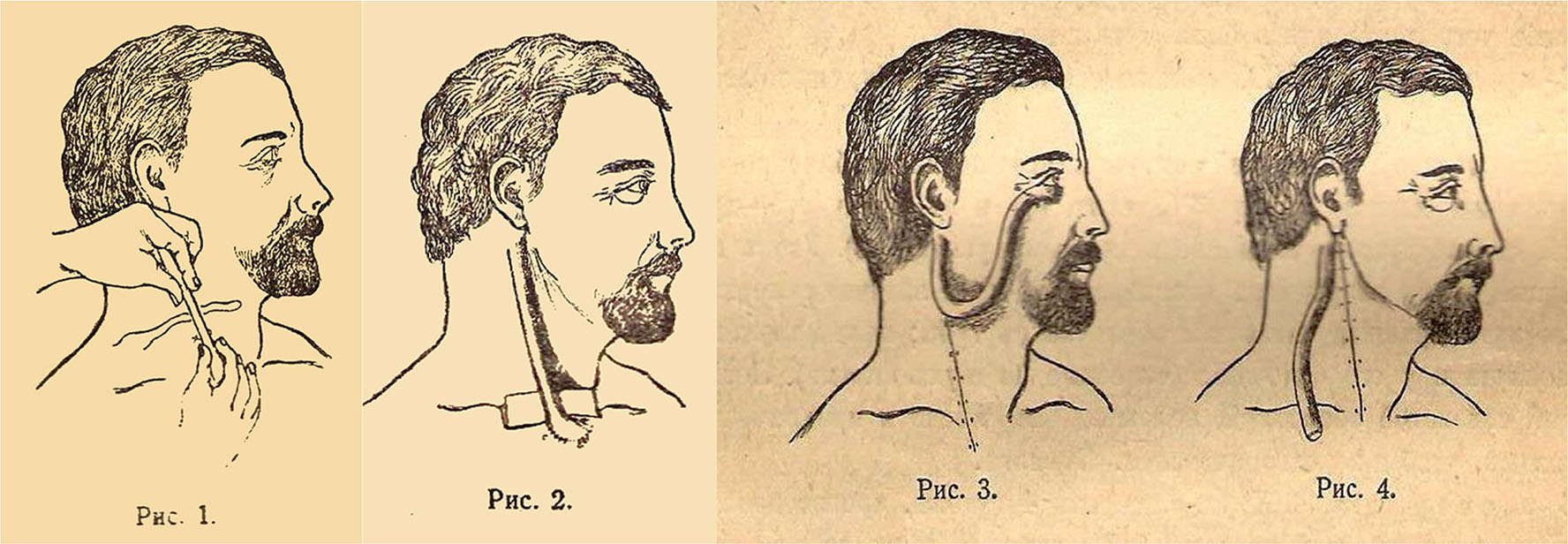
Four drawings illustrating the first tubed pedicle flap of Vladimir Filatov, 1916

A walking-stalk skin flap or waltzing tube pedicle is a reconstructive technique in which the skin and soft tissue to be used for the flap is formed into a tubular pedicle and moved from the source to the target site by anchoring at both ends, periodically severing one end and anchoring it closer to the flap target site. As antibiotics had not yet been invented when this procedure was developed, wrapping the flap in a tube was important because the risk of infection was reduced. The technique was invented by Vladimir Filatov (and a year later, independently by Harold Gillies) for the treatment of battle injuries, then developed by Archibald McIndoe . Archibald Mcindoe was widely recognised for many of these techniques.

The technique is now largely redundant due to advances in vascular surgery and microsurgery.
