= Robert Wright (British historian) =

Writer and RAF Officer

Robert Wright (1906–1992) was a historian and biographer of Hugh Dowding, the RAF's commanding officer in the Battle of Britain. Wright served as Dowding's personal assistant during the Battle. In his book Dowding and the Battle of Britain (1969) Wright was one of the early proponents of the Big Wing conspiracy theory that blamed Trafford Leigh-Mallory and the British Air Ministry for Dowding's removal from command at the end of the battle. Many of Wright's claims, some based on Dowding's faulty recollections, have been repudiated by witnesses and documentary evidence, but his allegations have proven popular and persistent over the years.

In November 1944, whilst serving as radar operator on No. 85 Squadron RAF, the Mosquito he was in crashed. The pilot died, but Wright survived and was taken to RAF Hospital Ely.

Prior to becoming a champion of Dowding, Wright co-wrote the biography of Dowding's rival and replacement at Fighter Command, Sholto Douglas in two volumes titled: Years of Combat and Years of Command (1966).
