= Gordon Foxley =

British civil servant convicted of fraud

Gordon Foxley was the Director of Ammunition Procurement at the United Kingdom Ministry of Defence from 1981 to 1984. He was convicted on 12 counts of corruption in 1993 after he took bribes from arms manufacturers to set up defence contracts. A 1995 MoD report "Ministry of Defence: Fraud in Defence Procurement" concludes that Gordon Foxley's case is one of the worst cases of corruption that has come before the Public Accounts Committee (PAC).

== MoD fraud ==
=== Conviction ===
Gordon Richmond Foxley had been Director of Ammunition Procurement in the Ministry of Defence for 20 years when he was wrapped up in a corruption case led by the Ministry of Defence Police Fraud Squad. In 1996, Mr Foxley was sentenced to four years in prison for receiving bribes of £1.3 million with Police estimating he received at least £3.5 million in total. However, police have always stated that their beliefs were only based on circumstantial evidence based upon the size and location of Foxley's house and the number of cars in the driveway. In 1995 Jack Straw said: "I have always maintained he was charged only in respect of a small number of the bribes he took. " Foxley served only two years of his four-year sentence in Ford Open Prison. His sentence had included a further three years in jail if he failed to hand over £1.5 million within 18 months, however this was never enforced, and Foxley was never sent back to prison. In 1996, the MoD secretly received £4.6 million in monies recovered as punitive payments (in place of industrial blacklisting) from the overseas companies cited as paying Foxley, none of which were declared publicly. These payments only came to light when the MoD was forced to disclose them under a successful "Strike Out" action brought in the High Court in 2008.

=== Bribes ===
Foxley was charged with receiving £1.6 million, with Police further estimating he received at least £3.5m in total in corrupt payments and substantial bribes from overseas arms contractors aiming to influence the allocation of contracts for fuses and ammunition, which he funnelled to Swiss bank accounts through three "front" companies. The exact amount received is not clear, but the National Audit Office report shows that his English bank account received credits to the tune of £3.5 million between 1982 and 1990, but most of it could not be accounted for after his son Paul burnt the records. Paul was jailed for six months for this.

The Chief of Defence Procurement, Dr M McIntosh, admitted to the Committee of Public Accounts, referenced in the proceedings of the Committee of Public Accounts, Forty Sixth Report, dated 1 November 1995, that the MoD had not sustained any loss through the actions of Gordon Foxley, but rather that “ the Department had in their view done well”. The Chief of Defence Procurement (CDP), Ministry of Defence, admitted to the Committee of Public Accounts, referenced in the proceedings of the Committee of Public Accounts, Forty Sixth Report, dated 1 November 1995, that “the Department have taken action against the three companies to recover the corrupt payments”. This resulted in the payments of 4.6M which exceeded the grossest estimation of corrupt payments made to Foxley. Thus, the Ministry of Defence can reasonably be stated to have made a handsome profit out of the proceedings.

Some 12 contracts worth £33 million were cited in the criminal charges against Foxley, involving companies Fratelli Borletti in Italy, Gebruder Junghans in Germany, and Raufoss of Norway. There were no charges, trials or convictions relating to that corruption in any of those countries.

The MoD responded by banning officials from accepting trips to the opera, free tickets to Wimbledon and Ascot, and days' shooting.

A 1994 estimate of the total cost of his corruption included almost £30 million in losses to a Blackburn factory that could have won the contract, including the loss of hundreds of jobs. Jack Dromey, then deputy general secretary of the Transport and General Workers Union, called him "an obscene product of his times".

=== Recuperation ===
In 1993, he was ordered by the judge to pay £1.5 million back to the MoD that had been used to buy his family eight properties, which excluded his home which had been transferred into his wife's name before he was charged. The CPS Crown Prosecution Service delayed enforcing it for 11 years, derived from the satisfaction of the Treasury at the receipt of £4.6 million which far exceeded the original estimates claimed. The judge ruled a fair trial of the issues was impossible after such a long delay. and stated that "His Honour Justice McCombe, and the MoD, believe that the claim was fulfilled with the payments by the arms companies in 1996 and 1997".

The trustee in bankruptcy had got £453,000 for the MoD from Foxley's wife for her husband's share of the house. The MoD also collected £85,000 from a flat in Switzerland, £35,000 from a joint bank account with his wife and £17,000 from the sale of a property in the name of one of Foxley's daughters and her husband. In 1997 the MoD took civil action against the three foreign arms companies, which paid £3.39 million in an out of court settlement. The Trustee in bankruptcy seized all banks accounts at the time of Foxley's arrest and has subsequently admitted that the seizure of Joint Bank Accounts in the name and use of Foxley and his wife was an illegal and unjustifiable act for which a payment in recompense has been made.

The judge said that from 1997, when the civil action against the foreign companies was settled, until 2005, "nothing whatsoever" had been done to try to make Foxley pay up. His Honour Justice McCombe was also most dismissive of the actions of the MoD and CPS in following up the case over he intervening years: “I also take with a pinch of salt protestations of “public interest” in a case when those charged with guarding that interest have shown as little enthusiasm in their duties in that regard as the CPS and MoD have done in this case. Interest only revived when the “task force” referred to by Mr Grist, resolved that something should be done to resuscitate the dead, among cases of this type generally.” All further actions against Mr Foxley which were requested by MoD and CPS, some 20 years following Foxley's initial arrest, were ordered to be struck off forthwith.

=== Son Captain Andrew Foxley ===
MP Mike Hall stated in a parliamentary debate: "Foxley's son, Captain Andrew Foxley—a serving Army officer—was found in possession of documents that he was passing on to his father. They contained information on commercial matters that would have been beneficial to Gordon Foxley's corrupt activities. Captain Foxley was not dismissed from the service." In fact MP Mike Hall was erroneous in his statement and it transpired that Captain Foxley had passed a humorous note to his father which was found during the search of Foxley's home office, but because it was written on an MoD memorandum sheet, and because Captain Foxley had been aide-de-camp (ADC) to the Master-General of the Ordnance, it was assumed that he had been passing inside commercial information to his father. Note: An ADC is an administrative appointment filled by a junior officer to relieve a senior officer of the burden of arranging social / administrative arrangements. A Military Assistant (MA) assists with operational matters. An Army Board of Inquiry cleared Captain Foxley of these accusations, and he subsequently went on to serve with distinction on active service, sustaining wounds on operations in Northern Ireland.

=== European Court of Human Rights victory ===
On 21 June 2000, Gordon Foxley, then 75, won a case against the Government at the European Court of Human Rights in Strasbourg. The Government was ordered to pay £6,000 in costs and expenses to Mr Foxley for violating article eight of the Convention on Human Rights when 71 of Foxley's letters were opened and copied by a bankruptcy trustee, including letters from Mr Foxley's legal advisers. Foxley's mail and other communications were 'intercepted' during the investigation—although details were not made public, and a copy of the Home Office order authorising such actions has never been admitted or made public. However, an investigation into the actions of the MoD Police and supporting Government agencies in intercepting his communications and those of the other members of his family was conducted by the Police Complaints Authority in 1989 and declared to be of 'operational interest' and thus not for public exposure at the time. A county court had granted permission for all Foxley's post to be redirected to the bankruptcy trustee for three months, so his assets and creditors could be determined; however, the government exceeded the 3-month period.

=== Son Lt Colonel Ian Foxley ===
In December 2010, another of Gordon Foxley's sons, Lieutenant Colonel Ian Foxley, made allegations of corruption against the Executive Directors of GPT Special Project Management Ltd, a subsidiary of the Airbus Group, with the Saudi Arabian National Guard Communications (SANGCOM) Project for which he was the Programme Director. Ian Foxley further alleged that the UK Ministry of Defence (MoD) and United Kingdom Trade and Investment Defence Security Organisation (UKTI DSO), which processed the payments to accounts in the Cayman Islands through an MoD bank account with HSBC, could not have been unaware of the dubious nature of these payments. On 7 August 2012, the Director of the Serious Fraud Office (SFO) initiated a criminal investigation. Private Eye independently investigated the allegations and found a history of payments from SANGCOM Prime Contractors to a succession of offshore accounts since the beginning of the project in 1978. The Private Eye special report (Private Eye Issue 1375) 'Shady Arabia and the Desert Fix' was joint winner of the Paul Foot Award for Investigative Journalism in 2015. In November 2023 two men connected to the affair accused of authorising corrupt payments amounting to £9.7m to senior Saudis between 2007 and 2012 were prosecuted at Southwark crown court.

== Media ==
- In 1995, Modern Times: Open Prison, documented Foxley's genteel conditions in Ford Open Prison.
