= Anna Zinkeisen =

Scottish painter (1901–1976)

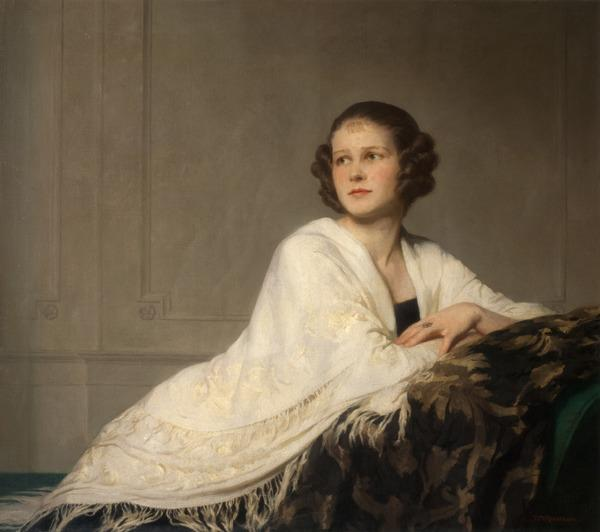
- Born: 29 August 1901; Kilcreggan, Scotland
- Died: 23 September 1976 (aged 75); London, England
- Education: Harrow School of Art; Royal Academy Schools
- Known for: Painting
- Spouse: Guy Heseltine

Anna Katrina Zinkeisen (29 August 1901 – 23 September 1976) was a Scottish painter and artist.

== Biography ==
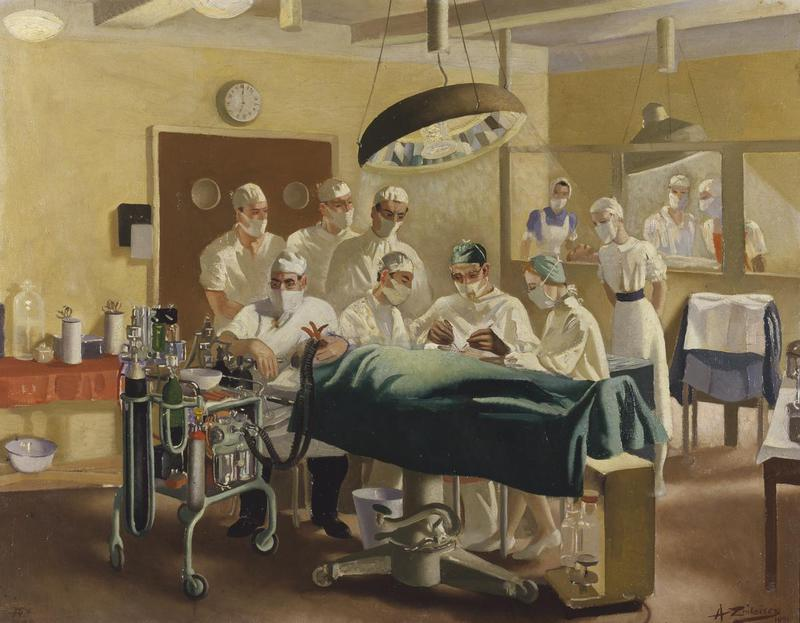
Archibald McIndoe, Consultant in Plastic Surgery to the Royal Air Force, operating at the Queen Victoria Plastic and Jaw Injury centre, East Grinstead by Anna Zinkeisen, 1944

Zinkeisen was born in Kilcreggan, Scotland, the daughter of Clare Bolton-Charles and Victor Zinkeisen, a shipper, manufacturer and yarn merchant. The family moved to Middlesex in England in 1909. Anna and her sister Doris were privately educated at home before they attended the Harrow School of Art from where they both won scholarships to the Royal Academy Schools. Anna studied sculpture at the Royal Academy Schools between 1916 and 1921, winning silver and bronze medals, and first exhibited at the Royal Academy in 1919. She received a commission for some plaques from the Wedgwood company and although these designs were awarded a silver medal at the Exposition des Art Decoratifs in Paris in 1925, Zinkeisen decided to specialise in portrait painting and mural work.

In 1935, Anna and Doris Zinkeisen were commissioned by the Clydebank shipbuilders John Brown and Company to paint murals on the ocean liner RMS Queen Mary. Their work can still be seen, in the Verandah Grill room, on the ship now permanently moored in Long Beach, California. At this time Anna was also working on a number of illustrations for books and magazine covers as well as designing posters, such as Merry-go-round and Motor Cycle and Cycle Show, Olympia 5–10 November 1935 for London Transport. In 1940 both sisters also contributed murals to the liner RMS Queen Elizabeth.

During World War II, Anna Zinkeisen worked as a Medical Artist and nursing auxiliary in the Order of St John at St. Mary's Hospital, Paddington. After completing a day's shift working on a ward as a casualty nurse, Zinkeisen would use a disused operating theatre as her studio to work on her paintings. During the conflict she painted scenes in the hospital and depictions of air-raid victims. She also made pathological drawings of war injuries for the Royal College of Surgeons. Her self-portrait and her painting of the plastic surgeon Sir Archibald McIndoe are both exhibited at the National Portrait Gallery (London). Among her other, later, portrait subjects were HRH Prince Philip, Sir Alexander Fleming and Lord Beaverbrook. Towards the end of the war London Underground commissioned Zinkeisen to produce a poster anticipating the end of the conflict. Her design showed a woman leading a family away from the war to sunlit fields over a quote from Winston Churchill.

In 1944, Anna and Doris Zinkeisen were commissioned by United Steel Companies (USC) to produce twelve paintings which were reproduced in the trade and technical press in Britain, Canada, Australia and South Africa. The images were subsequently collated in a book, This Present Age, published in 1946. Her work was also part of the painting event in the art competition at the 1948 Summer Olympics.

Anna Zinkeisen painted a mural, showing birds of the Bible (c. 1967), in memory of her husband Col. Guy Heseltine in St Botolph's church, Burgh, Suffolk. This mural had originally been intended as a memorial for the late King George VI (1895–1952) for the Royal Chapel at Windsor Great Park commissioned in 1962, but cancelled in 1964.
