= Archibald McIndoe =

New Zealand plastic surgeon (1900–1960)

Sir Archibald McIndoe CBE FRCS
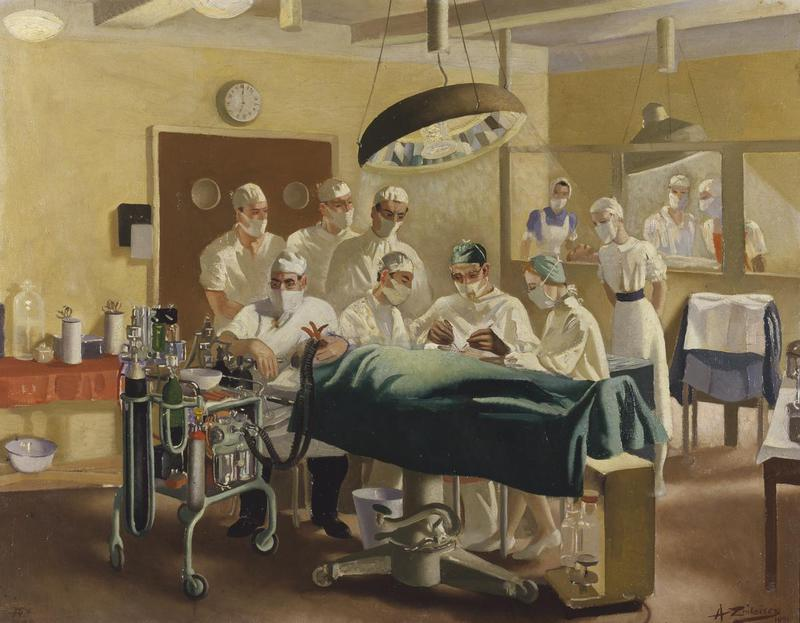
- McIndoe operating at East Grinstead: a painting by Anna Zinkeisen, 1944
- Born: Archibald Hector McIndoe; 4 May 1900; Dunedin, New Zealand
- Died: 11 April 1960 (aged 59); London, England
- Education: University of Otago
- Known for: Greatly improving the treatment and rehabilitation of badly burned aircrew
- Relatives: John McIndoe (father); Mabel Hill (mother); John McIndoe (brother); Alfred Hill (uncle); Harold Gillies (cousin)
- Medical career
- Profession: Surgeon
- Field: Plastic surgery
- Institutions: Hospital for Tropical Diseases; Royal North Stafford Infirmary; Queen Victoria Hospital
- Awards: Commandeur de la Légion d'honneur

Sir Archibald Hector McIndoe CBE FRCS (4 May 1900 – 11 April 1960) was a New Zealand plastic surgeon who worked for the Royal Air Force during the Second World War. He improved the treatment and rehabilitation of badly burned aircrew.

== Early life ==
Archibald McIndoe was born 4 May 1900 in Forbury, in Dunedin, New Zealand, into a family of four. His father was John McIndoe, a printer and his mother was the artist Mabel McIndoe née Hill. He had three brothers and one sister. McIndoe studied at Otago Boys' High School and later medicine at the University of Otago. After his graduation, he became a house surgeon at Waikato Hospital.

In 1924, McIndoe was awarded the first New Zealand Fellowship at the Mayo Clinic in the United States to study pathological anatomy. The fellowship was for an unmarried doctor and as McIndoe had recently married Adonia Aitkin they had to keep their marriage secret and he sailed without her. When it was no longer possible to maintain the secret she joined him 12 months later. He worked in the clinic as First Assistant in Pathological Anatomy 1925–1927 and published several papers on chronic liver disease. Impressed with his skill, Lord Moynihan suggested a career in Britain, and in 1930 McIndoe moved to London.

When McIndoe could not find work, his cousin Sir Harold Gillies, an otolaryngologist specialising in plastic surgery, invited him to join the private practice he ran with Rainsford Mowlem and offered him a job at St Bartholomew's Hospital, where he became a clinical assistant. In 1932, McIndoe received a permanent appointment as a General Surgeon and Lecturer at the Hospital for Tropical Diseases and the London School of Hygiene and Tropical Medicine.

In 1934, McIndoe received a Fellowship of the American College of Surgeons, where he worked until 1939. That year, he became a consulting plastic surgeon to the Royal North Stafford Infirmary and to Croydon General Hospital. In 1938, he was appointed consultant in plastic surgery to the Royal Air Force.

== Second World War ==
When the Second World War broke out, McIndoe moved to the recently rebuilt Queen Victoria Hospital in East Grinstead, Sussex, and founded a Centre for Plastic and Jaw Surgery. There, he treated very deep burns and serious facial disfigurement like loss of eyelids. With McIndoe's support, patients at the hospital formed the Guinea Pig Club, a social club and mutual support network: members included Richard Hillary, Geoffrey Page, Bill Foxley and Jimmy Edwards. The club grew to 649 members by the end of the war.

McIndoe developed new techniques for treating badly burned faces and hands, but also recognised the importance of the rehabilitation of the casualties and particularly of social reintegration back into normal life. He disposed of the "convalescent uniforms" and let the patients use their service uniforms instead. With the help of two friends, Neville and Elaine Blond, he also encouraged the locals to support the patients and invite them to their homes. McIndoe referred to the patients as "his boys", while the staff called him "the Boss" or "the Maestro".

Important work included development of the walking-stalk skin graft, and the discovery that immersion in saline promoted healing as well as improving survival rates for victims with extensive burns – this was a serendipitous discovery drawn from observation of differential healing rates in pilots who had come down on land and in the sea.

== Later years ==
After the end of the war, McIndoe returned to private practice. His speciality was the "McIndoe nose".

In 1947, he visited East Africa for the first time, and took up farming on Kilimanjaro.

In 1957, with two former pupils, Michael Wood and Tom Rees, he co-founded the African Medical and Research Foundation (AMREF).

He became a member of a council of the Royal College of Surgeons in 1946 and its vice-president in 1958. In 1958, McIndoe delivered the Bradshaw Lecture at the Royal College of Surgeons on the topic of the reconstruction of the burned face.

He took part in the founding of the British Association of Plastic Surgeons (BAPS) and later served as its third President.

The Guinea Pig Club continued to meet after the war, and McIndoe remained its President until his death.

== Death ==
Archibald McIndoe died in his sleep of a heart attack on 11 April 1960, aged 59, in his house at 84 Albion Gate, London. He was cremated at Golders Green Crematorium, and his ashes were given the unique honour for a civilian of being buried at the Royal Air Force church of St Clement Danes in London.

== Personal life ==
McIndoe married Adonia Aitkin of Dunedin on 31 July 1924. They had two daughters, Adonia and Vanora. They were divorced in 1953. In 1954, McIndoe married Constance Belchem, the former wife of Major-General R. F. K. Belchem.

== Legacy ==
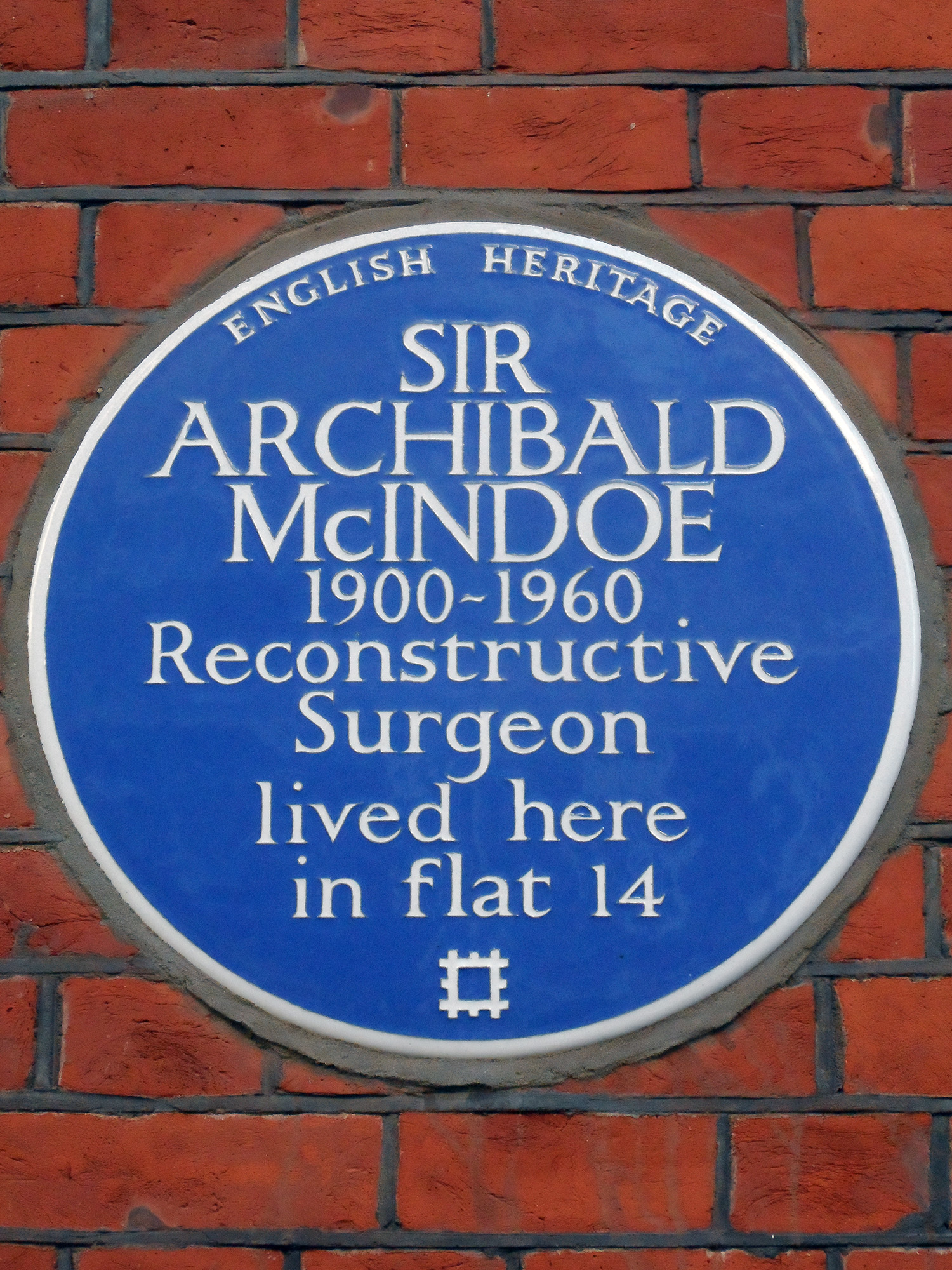
Blue plaque on McIndoe's former home at Avenue Court, 23–29 Draycott Avenue, Chelsea, London

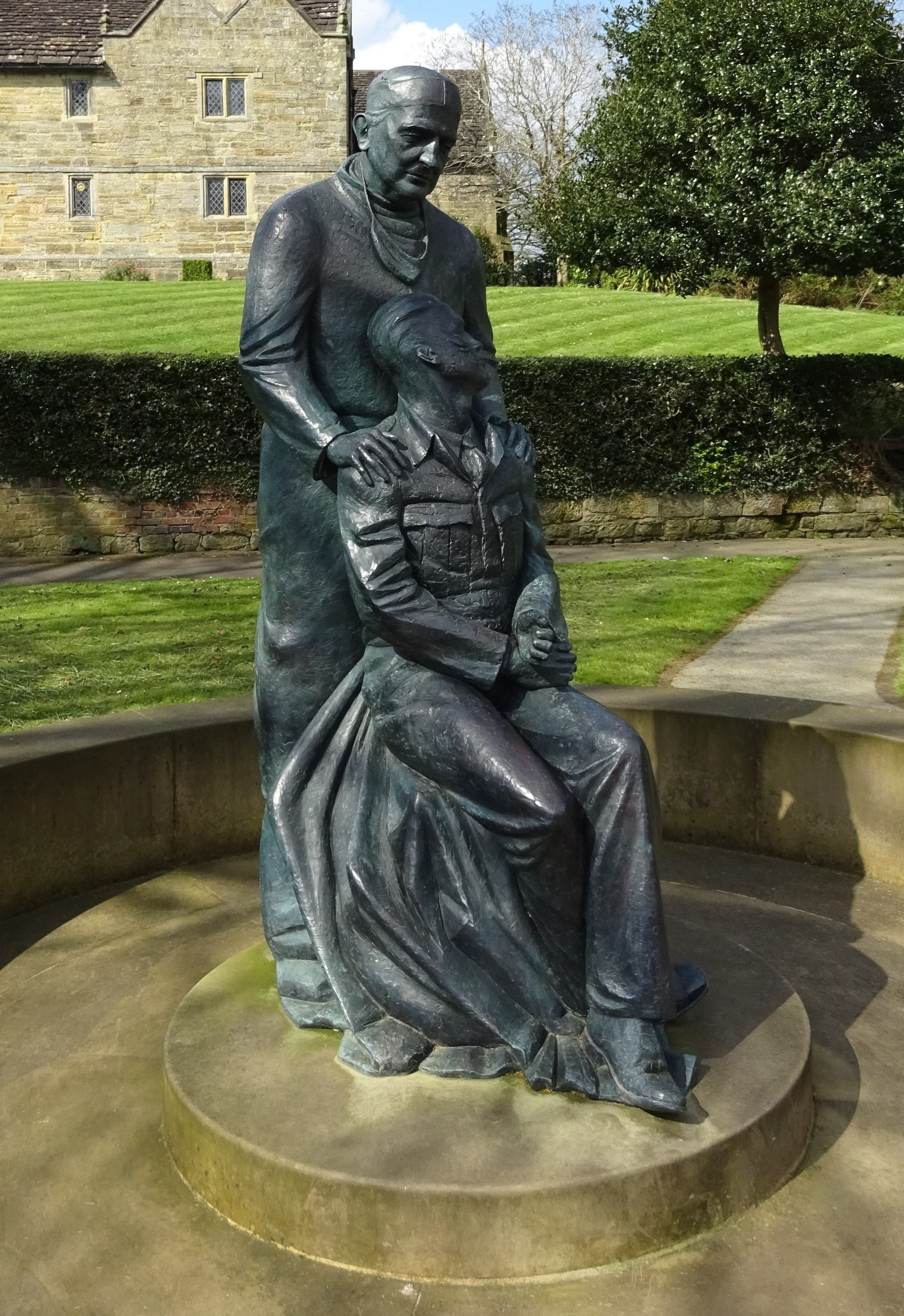
Monument to McIndoe in East Grinstead, by Martin Jennings

McIndoe was created CBE in 1944 and after the war he received a number of British and foreign honours, including a Commandeur de la Légion d'honneur (Commander of the Legion of Honour)

He was knighted in 1947 for his remarkable work on restoring the minds and bodies of the burnt young pilots of the Second World War through his innovative reconstructive surgery techniques.

On 22 March 1961, the British Minister of Health opened the Blond McIndoe Centre named in his honour at the Queen Victoria Hospital, East Grinstead. The Blond McIndoe Centre, now named the Blond McIndoe Research Foundation, continues research into pioneering treatments to improve wound healing. The Blond McIndoe Research Foundation is a registered charity.

The McIndoe Burns Centre at Queen Victoria Hospital was dedicated in 1994, and there is a burns victim support group centred there which also bears his name.

Specialist science laboratories at Otago Boys' High School, built in 1967, are named in his honour. The school later named one of its houses after McIndoe after the introduction of a house system in 2013.

The Gillies McIndoe Research Institute, a major medical research centre in Wellington, New Zealand, is named in honour of McIndoe and his cousin Sir Harold Gillies.

In 2000, an English Heritage blue plaque was erected on McIndoe's former London home at Avenue Court, Draycott Avenue, Chelsea.

A bronze monument commemorating McIndoe by Martin Jennings, whose own father was one of his patients, was unveiled by Princess Anne in East Grinstead High Street, in front of Sackville College, in 2014. It depicts the standing McIndoe resting his hands reassuringly on the shoulders of a seated injured airman, whose burned hands are clawed together, and whose scarred face is turned to one side. The two figures are encircled by a stone bench. Jennings described the airman as "looking up at the sky he cannot fly in any more".

It was reported in 2017 that a film named The Guinea Pig Club was being planned on McIndoe's career in World War II, directed by Roger Donaldson and starring Richard E. Grant as McIndoe.

== Publications ==
- McIndoe, A. H.; Counsellor, V. S. (1926). "Primary carcinoma of the liver of possible multicentric origin occurring in a case of portal cirrhosis". American Journal of Pathology. 2 (6): 557–66. PMC 1931785. PMID 19969721.
- McIndoe, A. H.; Counsellor, V. (1927). "A report on the bilaterality of the liver". Archives of Surgery. 15: 589. doi:10.1001/archsurg.1927.01130220092007.
- McIndoe, A. H. (1928). "Vascular lesions of portal cirrhosis". Archives of Pathology. 5: 23–42.
- McIndoe, A. H. (1928). "The structure and arrangement of the bile canaliculi". Archives of Pathology and Laboratory Medicine. 6: 598–614.
- McIndoe, A. H. (1932). "Delayed haemorrhage following traumatic rupture of the spleen". British Journal of Surgery. 20 (78): 249–68. doi:10.1002/bjs.1800207809. S2CID 70414493.
- McIndoe, A. H. (1937). "The treatment of hypospadias". American Journal of Surgery. 38: 176–185. doi:10.1016/s0002-9610(37)90415-x. S2CID 72499401.
- McIndoe, A. H. (1937). "Operation for the cure of adult hypospadias". British Medical Journal. 1 (3972): 385–404. doi:10.1136/bmj.1.3972.385. PMC 2088248. PMID 20780489.
- McIndoe, A. H. (1937). "The application of cavity grafting". Surgery. 1: 535.
- McIndoe, A. H.; Banister, J. Bright (1938). "An operation for the cure of congenital absence of the vagina". Journal of Obstetrics and Gynaecology of the British Commonwealth. 45 (3): 490–494. doi:10.1111/j.1471-0528.1938.tb11141.x. S2CID 72526349.
- McIndoe, A. H. (1938). "Correction of the alar deformity in cleft lip and palate". The Lancet. 1: 607. doi:10.1016/s0140-6736(00)86824-5.
- McIndoe, A. H. (1940). "The functional aspect of burn therapy". Proceedings of the Royal Society of Medicine. 34: 56–65.
- McIndoe, A. H. (1941). "Diagnosis and treatment of injuries of the middle third of the face". British Dental Journal. 71: 235.
- McIndoe, A. H. (1948). "Deformities of the male urethra". British Journal of Plastic Surgery. 1 (1): 29–47. doi:10.1016/s0007-1226(48)80007-x. PMID 18874750.
- McIndoe, A. H. (1948). "The treatment of hypospadias". British Journal of Plastic Surgery. 1 (1): 29–47. doi:10.1016/s0007-1226(48)80007-x. PMID 18874750.
- McIndoe, A. H. (1949). "Editorial". British Journal of Plastic Surgery. 2 (1): 1–3. doi:10.1016/S0007-1226(49)80002-6.
- McIndoe, A. H. (1949). "Total facial reconstruction following burns". Postgraduate Medicine. 6 (3): 187–200. doi:10.1080/00325481.1949.11945603. PMID 18139763.
- McIndoe, A. H. (1950). "Treatment of congenital absence and obliterative conditions of the vagina". British Journal of Plastic Surgery. 2 (4): 254–67. PMID 15410301.
- McIndoe, A. H. (1950). "Discussion on the treatment of chronic oedema of the leg". Proceedings of the Royal Society of Medicine. 43 (12): 1043–1059. doi:10.1177/003591575004301218. PMC 2081866.
- McIndoe, A. H. (1957). "[unknown]". In Skoog, Tord; Ivy, Robert H. (eds.). Transactions of the International Society of Plastic Surgeons: First Congress, Stockholm and Uppsala, 1955. Baltimore: Williams & Wilkins Co. p. 414.
- McIndoe, A. H. (1958). "The surgical management of Dupuytren's contracture". American Journal of Surgery. 95 (2): 197–203. doi:10.1016/0002-9610(58)90502-6. PMID 13487940.
- McIndoe, A. H. (1958). "Mammaplasty: indications, technique, and complications". British Journal of Plastic Surgery. 10: 307–320. doi:10.1016/s0007-1226(57)80046-0.
- McIndoe, A. H.; Owen Smith, B. (1958). "Congenital familial fibromatosis of the gums with the teeth as a probable ætiological factor: report of an affected family". British Journal of Plastic Surgery. 11: 62–71. doi:10.1016/S0007-1226(58)80008-9.
- McIndoe, A. H.; Rees, T. D. (1959). "Synchronous repair of secondary deformities in cleft lip and nose". Plastic and Reconstructive Surgery. 24 (2): 150–61. doi:10.1097/00006534-195908000-00002. S2CID 71806534.
- McIndoe, A. H.; Simmons, C. A. (1959). "Discussion on the treatment of congenital absence of vagina with emphasis on long-term results". Proceedings of the Royal Society of Medicine. 52: 952–54. doi:10.1177/003591575905201114. PMC 1870795.
- McIndoe, A. H. (1983). "Total reconstruction of the burned face: The Bradshaw Lecture 1958". British Journal of Plastic Surgery. 36 (4): 410–20. doi:10.1016/0007-1226(83)90119-4. PMID 6626818.

== See also ==
- Mollie Lentaigne, a medical artist and nurse at East Grinstead who made drawings of McIndoe's procedures

== Bibliography ==
- Bennett, J. P. (1988). "A history of the Queen Victoria Hospital, East Grinstead". British Journal of Plastic Surgery. 41 (4): 422–440. doi:10.1016/0007-1226(88)90088-4. PMID 3293680.
- Bishop, Edward (2001). McIndoe's Army. London: Grub Street. ISBN 1-902304-93-4.
- Hodgkinson, Colin (1957). Best Foot Forward. London: Odhams. – autobiography of a double amputee (both legs) fighter pilot who was treated many times to repair facial damage
- McCleave, Hugh (1961). McIndoe: Plastic Surgeon. London: Frederick Muller.
- Mayhew, Emily (2006). The Reconstruction of Warriors: Archibald McIndoe, the Royal Air Force and the Guinea Pig Club. Greenhill Books. ISBN 1-85367-610-1.
- Meikle, Murray C. (2013). Reconstructing Faces: the art and wartime surgery of Gillies, Pickerill, McIndoe and Mowlem. Dunedin: Otago University Press. ISBN 978-1-877578-39-7.
- Mosley, Leonard (1962). Faces from the Fire: the biography of Sir Archibald McIndoe. London: Weidenfeld & Nicolson.
