= Queen Victoria Hospital =

Hospital in East Grinstead, England

- Queen Victoria Hospital NHS Foundation Trust

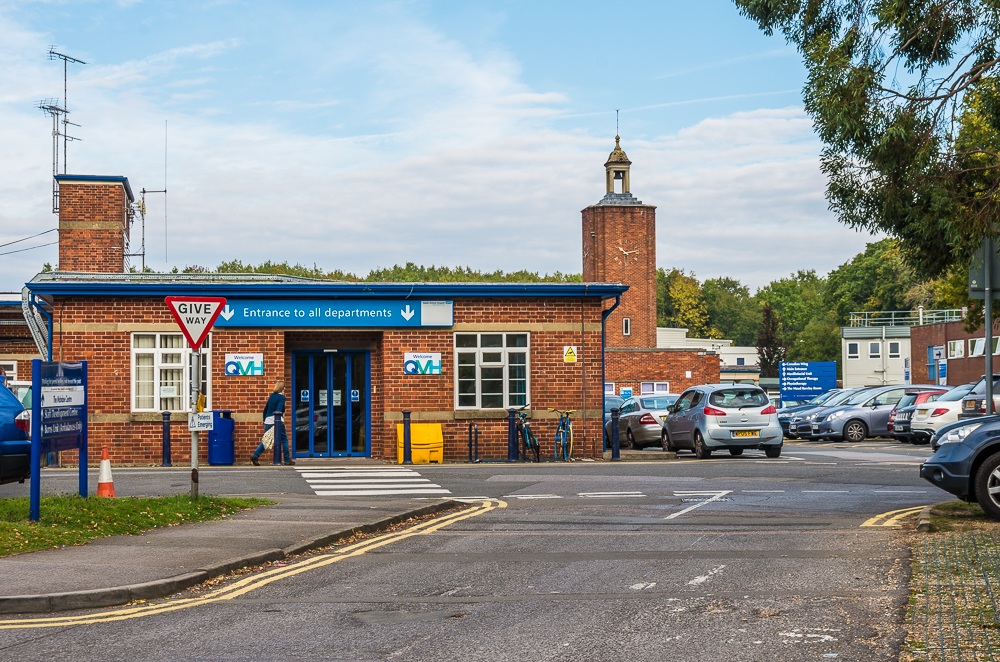
- Queen Victoria Hospital

Geography
- Location: East Grinstead, West Sussex, England
- Coordinates: 51.1349°N 0.0019°W

Organisation
- Care system: National Health Service
- Affiliated university: Brighton and Sussex Medical School

Services
- Emergency department: Minor injuries unit only
- Beds: 80

History
- Founded: 1863; 163 years ago

Links
- Website: www.qvh.nhs.uk

The Queen Victoria Hospital (QVH), located in East Grinstead, West Sussex, England is the specialist reconstructive surgery centre for the south east of England, and also provides services at clinics across the region. It has become world-famous for its pioneering burns and plastic surgery. The hospital was named after Queen Victoria. It is managed by the Queen Victoria Hospital NHS Foundation Trust.

== History ==
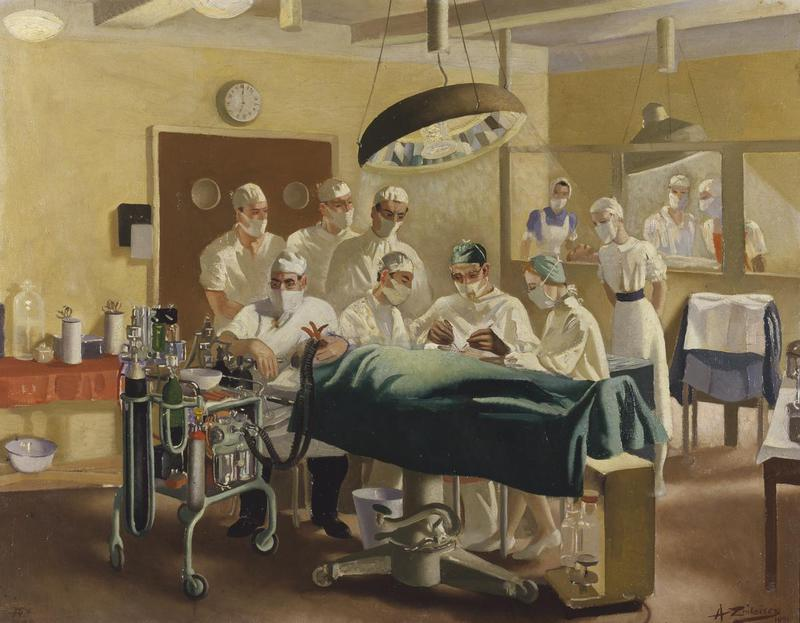
Archibald McIndoe operating at East Grinstead: a painting by Anna Zinkeisen, 1944

Founded as East Grinstead Cottage Hospital in 1863, the hospital adopted the name, "Queen Victoria Hospital", in the 1930s and moved to its present site in 1936.

During the Second World War, it developed as a specialist burns unit under the leadership of Sir Archibald McIndoe, and became world-famous for pioneering treatment of RAF and allied aircrew who were badly burned or crushed and required reconstructive plastic surgery. It was where the Guinea Pig Club was formed in 1941, as a social club and support network for the aircrew and their family members. The club continued to provide assistance for Guinea Pigs for many years after the war, and met regularly in East Grinstead until 2007. The Queen Victoria Hospital remains at the forefront of specialist care today, and is renowned for its burns treatment facilities and expertise throughout England.

In recent years a major programme of site developments has been underway to replace the ageing estate. In 2012, a new outpatients department opened, along with refurbished burns and paediatric units. Six new operating theatres were opened by the Princess Royal in October 2013.

== Services ==
The hospital is the regional centre of excellence for burns and for reconstructive surgery – the use of specialist techniques such as tissue transplant and microvascular surgery in the restoration of people who have suffered disfigurement or destructive damage from disease, trauma, major surgery, or congenitally. Specialist units that carry out these services include:

- Burns Centre: The QVH Burns Centre provides specialist burns care treatment for people living in the South East of England. The hospital was involved in controversy in August 2007 when it turned away an 8-month-old burn victim arriving by air ambulance. The row was finally resolved with both sides agreeing to disagree over the issue. In conjunction with the Kent Police, a young woman who was seriously burned by a firework and treated at Queen Victoria Hospital has made a video telling her story to help other young people understand the dangers that fireworks present. The paediatrics burns inpatient service was closed in 2019.
- Corneo Plastic Unit: The Corneo Plastic Unit was established by Sir Benjamin Rycroft in the 1940s. The unit specialises in corneal transplantation surgery and oculoplastics. The eye bank, previously named the National Eye Bank at the Queen Victoria Hospital, was established formally in 1952. Sir Benjamin Rycroft was instrumental in the passage of the Tissue Procurement Act, a key piece of legislation with respect to all transplant surgery in the UK. The Corneo Plastic and Ophthalmology unit continues to perform corneal transplantation, lamellar grafts, and stem cell transplantation for ocular surface rehabilitation. Raman Malhotra, consultant ophthalmologist at the hospital, discovered a method of treating Blepharospasm using filters.
- Maxillofacial Surgery: The Maxillofacial unit has an international reputation as a training and teaching unit, with staff specialising in oral surgery, orthodontics, facial trauma, head and neck cancer, orthognathic surgery, salivary gland disease, face and jaw reconstruction, and developmental facial deformity. The unit performed major reconstructive surgery on a Crawley woman who was savaged by her own dog.
- Therapies Department: The Therapies Department support the rehabilitation of patients undergoing specialist treatment at the hospital. It also provides a wide range of services for the local community, including physiotherapy, back pain clinics, speech and language therapy, weight management clinics and Parkinson's groups. The department is also part of the first and largest multidisciplinary expert facial palsy team, treating palsy and paralysis patients from across the country.

== Telemedicine ==
As the regional specialist centre for reconstructive surgery following trauma, Queen Victoria Hospital (QVH) has a well-established telemedicine referral system. In 2008 the service won the regional Innovation and Communications Technology Award and the QVH telemedicine system was also chosen to form part of the Institute of Engineering & Technology's 2008 Faraday Lecture on the overall theme of engineering in health and has been included in a documentary.

== Performance ==
In the national cancer patient survey for 2011/12, the hospital achieved the highest score for care quality out of all 160 hospital trusts providing cancer services. Ninety-four per cent of cancer patients surveyed rated the care they received at QVH as 'excellent' or 'very good'.

In the national NHS inpatient survey for 2011, the hospital achieved the highest scores in the country for 27 of the 61 questions asked, including 'Overall, how would you rate the care you received?'.

In the 2011 national NHS staff survey, 94% of doctors and nurses said they would recommend their hospital to friends and family, more than at any other hospital in the country.

In 2011, it was found to be the most recommended NHS hospital in the country by the independent Dr Foster Hospital Guide.

It was named by the Health Service Journal as one of the top hundred NHS trusts to work for in 2015. At that time it had 817 full-time equivalent staff and a sickness absence rate of 3.58%. 91% of staff recommend it as a place for treatment and 74% recommended it as a place to work.

In 2018/9 it faced a £5.9 million deficit, around 10% of its turnover, and needed to borrow money to pay its bills. It forecasts deficits of around £7 million, roughly 10% of its turnover, each year from 2019 to 2023.

== Queen Victoria Hospital NHS Foundation Trust ==
Queen Victoria Hospital NHS Foundation Trust
- Type: NHS foundation trust
- Established: 1 November 1993
- Headquarters: East Grinstead, West Sussex, England
- Hospitals: Queen Victoria Hospital
- Staff: 1,129 (2024/25)

Queen Victoria Hospital NHS Foundation Trust is the NHS foundation trust which runs the hospital.

It established as the Queen Victoria Hospital NHS Trust on 1 November 1993, and became operational on 1 April 1994. It took over functions previously provided by the Tunbridge Wells Health Authority.

It was granted foundation trust status on 1 July 2004.

=== Locations ===
In addition to the main QVH site, the trust also provides services at the following hospitals across South East England:

- Darent Valley Hospital in Dartford
- Horsham Hospital
- Kent and Canterbury Hospital
- Maidstone Hospital
- Medway Maritime Hospital in Gillingham
- William Harvey Hospital in Ashford

== Transport ==
This hospital is served by Metrobus routes 281 and 400 which link the hospital to the town centre and East Grinstead railway station.

== See also ==
- Healthcare in Sussex
- List of hospitals in England
