= Flap (surgery) =

Surgical procedure in which tissue is transferred with intact blood supply

Flap surgery
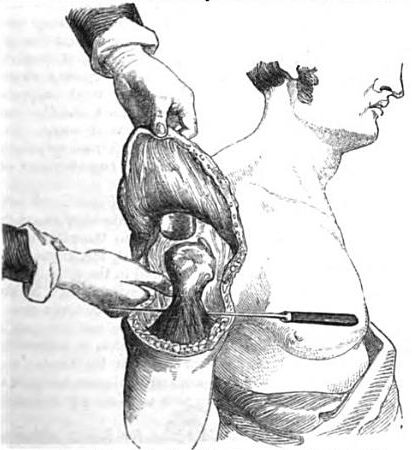
- Engraving by John Eric Erichsen depicting flap surgery used to cover an amputation stump
- ICD-9-CM: 86.7

Flap is a surgical technique in plastic and reconstructive surgery where a bulk of tissue with an intact blood supply is lifted (mobilized) from the original (donor) site and moved to a new (recipient) site. Flaps are distinct from grafts, which are autotransplantations that do not come with an intact blood supply and rely on the growth of new blood vessels (neovascularization) to stay viable.

== Uses ==
Flaps are typically done for the following purposes:

- To fill an iatrogenic defect or cavity caused by significant tissue loss due to injury, surgical excision or debridement, which would predispose the area to postoperative seroma and/or abscess formation;
- To close a gaping wound that cannot be sutured directly, have difficulty healing by secondary intention and the remaining tissue is unable to support a graft;
- To reduce tension across the wound, which would disrupt healing and lead to excessive scarring or wound dehiscence, or;
- To reconstruct complex anatomic structures like breasts or jaws, as flaps may also carry over tissues such as muscles and bones that may be useful in partially restoring functions within the body region.

== Anatomy ==
Flaps can contain many different combination of layers of tissue, from skin to bone (see § Classification). The main goal of a flap is to maintain blood flow to tissue to maintain survival, and understanding the anatomy in flap design is key to a successful flap surgery.

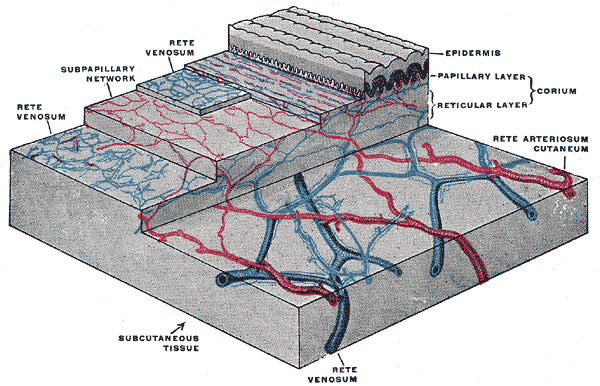
The distribution of the blood vessels in the skin of the sole of the foot. The dermis is referred to as corium.

=== Skin anatomy ===
Flaps may include skin in their construction. Skin is important for many reasons, but its role in thermoregulation, immune function, and blood supply aid in flap survival. The skin can be divided into three main layers: the epidermis, dermis, and subcutaneous tissue. Blood is mainly supplied to the skin by two networks of blood vessels. The deep network lies between the dermis and the subcutaneous tissue, while the shallow network lies within the papillary layer of the dermis. The epidermis is supplied by diffusion from this shallow network and both networks are supplied by collaterals, and by perforating arteries that bring blood from deeper layers either between muscles (septocutaneous perforators) or through muscles (musculocutaneous perforators).

This robust and redundant blood supply is important in flap surgery, because flaps are cut off from other blood vessels when they are raised and removed from surrounding native tissue. The remaining blood supply must then keep the tissue alive until additional blood supply can be formed through angiogenesis.

=== Angiosome ===
The angiosome is a concept first coined by Ian Taylor in 1987. It is a three-dimensional region of tissue that is supplied by a single artery and can include skin, soft tissue, and bone. Adjacent angiosomes are connected by narrower choke vessels, and multiple angiosomes can be supplied by a single artery. Knowledge of these supply arteries and their associated angiosomes is useful in planning the location, size, and shape of a flap.

== Classification ==
Flaps can be fundamentally classified by their mechanism of movement, the types of tissues present, or by their blood supply. The surgeon generally chooses the least complex type that will achieve the desired effect via a concept known as the reconstructive ladder.

=== Mechanism of movement ===
Local flaps

Advancement flap

Rotation flap

Transposition flap

- Local flaps are created by freeing a layer of tissue and then stretching the freed layer to fill a defect. This is the least complex type of flap and includes advancement flaps, rotation flaps, and transposition flaps, from least to most complex respectively. With an advancement flap, incisions are extended out parallel from the wound, creating a rectangle with one edge remaining intact. This rectangle is freed from the deeper tissues and then stretched (or advanced) forward to cover the wound. The flap is disconnected from the body, except for the uncut edge which contains the blood supply which feeds in horizontally. A rotation flap is similar except that, instead of being stretched in a straight line, the flap is stretched in an arc. The more complex transposition flap involves rotating an adjacent piece of tissue, resulting in the creation of a new defect that must then be closed.
- Regional or interpolation flaps are not immediately adjacent to the defect. Instead, the freed tissue "island" is moved over or underneath normal tissue to reach the defect to be filled, with the blood supply still connected to the donor site via a pedicle. The pedicle can be removed after a new blood supply has formed. Examples: pectoralis major myocutaneous flap and deltopectoral flap for head and neck defects, and latissimus dorsi flap and traverse rectus abdominal muscle (TRAM) flap for breast reconstruction.
- Distant flaps are used when the donor site is far from the defect. These are the most complex class of flap. Direct or tubed flaps involve having the flap connected to both the donor and recipient sites simultaneously, forming a bridge. This allows blood to be supplied by the donor site while a new blood supply from the recipient site is formed. Once this happens, the bridge can be disconnected from the donor site if necessary, completing the transfer. A free flap has the blood supply cut and then reattached microsurgically to a new blood supply at the recipient site.

=== Tissue type ===
- Cutaneous flaps contain the full thickness of the skin, fat, and superficial fascia and are used to fill small defects. These are typically supplied by a random blood supply. Examples include Z-plasty, deep inferior epigastric perforator (DIEP) flaps, and V-Y advancement flaps.
- Fasciocutaneous flaps contain subcutaneous tissue and deep fascia, resulting in a more robust blood supply and ability to fill a larger defect. The Cormack and Lamberty classification is used for the vascular supply of fasciocutaneous flaps. Examples include emporoparietal and anterolateral thigh fasciocutaneous flaps, lateral fasciocutaneous flaps and posterior fasciocutaneous flaps.

Breast reconstruction using the latissimus dorsi muscle and an implant. This is an example of a pedicled musculocutaneous flap.

- Musculocutaneous and muscle flaps contain a layer of muscle to provide bulk that can fill a deeper defect. If skin cover is needed, a skin graft can be placed over top of it. Examples include gastrocnemius flaps, latissimus dorsi flaps, TRAM flaps, and transverse upper gracillis flaps.
- Bone flaps contain bone and are used when structural support is needed, such as in jaw reconstruction or fibula flaps.
- Omental flaps can be used in chest wall defects, and intestinal flaps can be used to reconstruct tubular structures like the esophagus.

=== Vascular supply ===
- Axial flaps are supplied by a named artery and vein. This allows for a larger area to be freed from surrounding and underlying tissue, leaving only a small pedicle containing the vessels. Reverse-flow flaps are a type of axial flap in which the supply artery is cut on one end and blood is supplied by backwards flow from the other direction. Random flaps are simpler and have no named blood supply; they are supplied by the subdermal plexus.
- Pedicled flaps remain attached to the donor site via a pedicle that contains the blood supply, in contrast to a free flap, where the vessels are cut and anastomosed to another blood supply.

== Contraindications ==
Anyone who is unstable for surgery should not undergo flap surgery. As with most surgeries, people who are sicker may have more difficulties with wound healing. Comorbidities include diabetes, smoking, immunosuppression, and vascular disease.

== Risks or complications ==
The risks of flap surgery include infection, wound breakdown, fluid accumulation, bleeding, damage to nearby structures, and scarring. The most notable risk of this procedure is flap death, where the flap loses blood supply. This can be due to many reasons, but is commonly due to tension on the vascular supply and insufficient blood flow to the end segments of the flap. This can sometimes be fixed with another surgery or using additional methods of healing in the reconstructive ladder.

== Recovery ==
Healing of a flap maintains the same process as healing of any wound. There are four stages: hemostasis, inflammation, proliferation, and remodeling, all of which can take up to a year to complete.

Following flap surgery, the biggest risk in recovery is flap death. Flap failure is an uncommon occurrence but does happen. The reported flap failure rate in free flaps is less than 5%. This is most commonly caused by venous insufficiency; this accounts for of 54% of all failures. Venous insufficiency is commonly caused by a venous thrombus within the first 2 days following surgery. After the immediate postoperative risk, the flap will continue to heal, adhering to the stages of normal wound healing. It can take over 3 months for an incision to be at 80% tensile strength compared to normal tissue.

== History ==
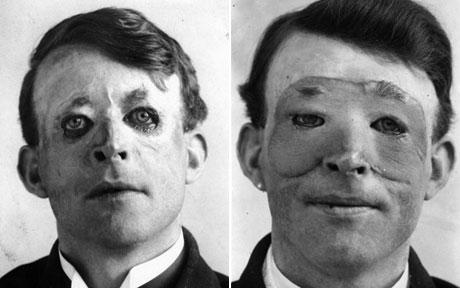
Walter Yeo, before (left) and after (right) skin flap surgery performed by Harold Gillies in 1917.

Skin flaps are an essential part of a surgeon's toolbox in plastic surgery. It is part of the reconstructive ladder. The first known report of surgical flaps comes from 600 BC, in India. The Sushruta records that the tilemakers' caste would reconstruct noses using regional flaps, due to the practice of nose amputations as a form of legal punishment. The next description of flap surgery comes from Celsus, an ancient Roman who described the advancement of skin flaps from 25 BC to 50 AD. In the 15th century, Gaspare Tagliacozzi, an Italian surgeon, helped develop the "Italian method" for nasal reconstruction: a delayed pedicle skin graft, where the skin from the arm would be attached to the nose for many months, to create the reconstruction. This was first printed in the 1597 book De Curtorum Chirurgia per Insitionem. The Italian method was rediscovered in 1800 by German surgeon Carl Ferdinand von Graefe. Major advancements in modern plastic surgery are mostly attributed to Harold Gillies, who pioneered facial reconstruction during World War I by using pedicled tube flaps on patients like Walter Yeo, and Gilles' cousin Archibald McIndoe, who developed the walking-stalk skin flap in 1930.

With the introduction of the operating microscope, microvascular surgery advancements allowed for the anastomosis of blood vessels. This led to the ability of free tissue transfers and, in 1958, Bernard Seidenberg transferred a part of the jejunum to the esophagus, in order to remove a cancer. Modern advancements in flap surgeries have continued since this time and are now commonly used in many procedures.

== See also ==
- Breast reconstruction
- DIEP flap
- Hand surgery
- List of plastic surgery flaps
- Perforator flaps
- Rhinoplasty
- Rotation flap
- Skin cancer
- Z-plasty
