= List of plastic surgery flaps =

Several techniques for creating flaps are used in plastic surgery.

== List of flaps ==
Name	Tissue Type	Complexity	Use
Abbe flap	Cutaneous	Transposition	Full-thickness lip defects
Anterolateral thigh flap (ALT flap)	Musculocutaneous	Free flap/Interpolation	Abdominal wall/ Open tibial fractures / Esophageal reconstruction / Phalloplasty / Head and neck reconstruction
Becker flap	Fasciocutaneous	Interpolation	Hand reconstruction
Deep inferior epigastric perforator (DIEP) flap	Cutaneous	Free flap	Free flap breast reconstruction
Dufourmental flap	Cutaneous	Rotation/Transposition	
Estlander flap	Cutaneous	Transposition	Labial commissure of mouth defects
Fibular flap	Osteocutaneous	Free flap	Mandible reconstruction
Gastrocnemius flap	Muscle	Interpolation	Open tibial fractures
Hatchett design flap	Cutaneous	Advancement	Forehead excisions/defects
Inferior gluteal artery perforator (IGAP) flap	Cutaneous	Free flap	Free flap breast reconstruction
Karapandzic flap	Cutaneous	Rotation	Full-thickness lip defects
Latissimus flap	Musculocutaneous	Interpolation	Breast reconstruction
McGregor flap	Cutaneous	Rotation	Full-thickness lip defects
Posterior interosseous artery (PIA) flap	Fasciocutaneous	Interpolation	Hand reconstruction
Radial forearm/Chinese flap	Fasciocutaneous	Interpolation	Hand reconstruction / Foot and ankle reconstruction /Head and neck reconstruction / Phalloplasty
Reverse sural artery flap	Muscle	Interpolation	Calcaneal pressure sores
Rhombic/Limberg flap	Cutaneous	Rotation/Transposition	
Scapular flap	Osteocutaneous	Free flap	Mandible reconstruction
Shutter design flap	Cutaneous	Advancement	Forehead excisions
Superficial inferior epigastric artery (SIEA) flap	Cutaneous	Free flap	Free flap breast reconstruction
Superior gluteal artery perforator (SGAP) flap	Cutaneous	Free flap	Free flap breast reconstruction
Transverse rectus abdominis myocutaneous (TRAM) flap	Musculocutaneous	Free flap	Free flap breast reconstruction
Transverse upper gracillis (TUG) flap	Musculocutaneous	Free flap	Free flap breast reconstruction
V-Y advancement flap	Cutaneous	Advancement	Rhinoplasty
Worthen forehead flap	Cutaneous	Rotation	Forehead excisions/defects
Z-plasty	Cutaneous	Transposition	scars
Keystone perforator island flap	Fasciocutaneous	Rotation and trasnposition	Orthopedic and integumentary reconstruction

== See also ==
- Flap (surgery)
- Perforator flaps
