= Reconstructive ladder =

Framework for wound management

The reconstructive ladder is the set of levels of increasingly complex management of wounds in reconstructive plastic surgery. The surgeon should start on the lowest rung and move up until a suitable technique is reached.

There are several small variations in the reconstructive ladder in the scientific literature, but the principles remains the same:

1. Healing by secondary intention
2. Primary closure
3. Delayed primary closure
4. Split thickness graft
5. Full thickness skin graft
6. Tissue expansion
7. Random flap
8. Axial flap
9. Free flap

== See also ==
- List of plastic surgery flaps
- Perforator flaps
