= Free flap breast reconstruction =

Type of autologous-tissue breast reconstruction

- Specialty: Plastic surgeon

Free-flap breast reconstruction is a type of autologous-tissue breast reconstruction applied after mastectomy for breast cancer, without the emplacement of a breast implant prosthesis. As a type of plastic surgery, the free-flap procedure for breast reconstruction employs tissues, harvested from another part of the woman's body, to create a vascularised flap, which is equipped with its own blood vessels. Breast-reconstruction mammoplasty can sometimes be realised with the application of a pedicled flap of tissue that has been harvested from the latissimus dorsi muscle, which is the broadest muscle of the back, to which the pedicle (“foot”) of the tissue flap remains attached until it successfully grafts to the recipient site, the mastectomy wound. Moreover, if the volume of breast-tissue excised was of relatively small mass, breast augmentation procedures, such as autologous-fat grafting, also can be applied to reconstruct the breast lost to mastectomy.

In surgical praxis, the abdomen is the primary donor-site for harvesting the tissues to create the free flap, because that region of the woman's body usually contain's sufficient (redundant) adipocyte fat and skin -tissues that are biologically compatible and aesthetically adequate for the construction of a substitute breast. The secondary donor-sites for harvesting adipocyte and skin tissues to create a free flap are the regions of: (i) the gluteus maximus muscles, (ii) the medial thigh, (iii) the buttocks, and (iv) the waist of the woman's body.

The clinical advantage of the free-flap breast reconstruction procedure is avoidance of the medical complications—infection, malposition of the breast implant(s), capsular contracture—which occasionally occur consequent to breast-reconstruction surgery procedures that emplace breast prostheses to the mastectomy wounds. In which cases, the correction of such medical complications might surgically require either the revision (rearrangement) or the explantation (removal) of the breast implants.

For the woman, the anatomic, aesthetic, and psychologic advantages of a free-flap reconstruction procedure are the natural shape, texture, and appearance of the reconstructed breast, and the fact that it will undergo the same biological changes that are natural and normal to the woman's body as she ages; the breast reconstructed with autologous tissues will not remain unnaturally youthful, as would be the case with a breast-implant reconstruction procedure.

The clinical disadvantages of free-flap breast reconstruction surgery are: (i) the technical complexity of the plastic surgery procedure, (ii) prolonged surgical operation times, (iii) additional, secondary scarring at the flap-tissue donor site, (iv) possible medical complications at the flap-tissue donor-site, and (v) possible necrosis of the tissues harvested to create the free-flap.

Therapeutically, the free-flap breast reconstruction procedure is always possible after radiation oncology for the treatment of breast cancer. Technically, an autologous-tissue breast reconstruction is a good resolution to a failed breast-implant reconstruction.

== Techniques ==
=== Abdomen ===
==== TRAM flap — Transverse Rectus Abdominis Myocutaneous free flap ====
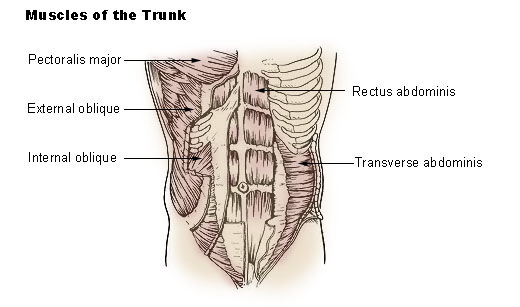
The TRAM free-flap is harvested from the musclus transversus abdominis of the trunk. (right)

Technique

The Transverse Rectus Abdominis Myocutaneous free-flap, created from the transverse abdominal muscle, is a breast reconstruction flap harvested from the abdomen of the woman. The TRAM flap is composed of skin, adipocyte fat, and the musculus rectus abdominis, which is perfused (irrigated) by the deep inferior epigastric artery and by the deep inferior epigastric vein. Once the TRAM free flap is transposed to the woman's chest, the epigastric blood vessels are anastomosed (connected) to the internal thoracic vein to maintain the tissue viability of the reconstructed breast.

Advantages

Technically, the harvesting of the TRAM free-flap is relatively easy and fast; because it possesses a robust blood supply, there is a low risk of tissue necrosis, either of the flap or of the adipocyte fat, and the reconstructed breast can tolerate oncologic radiotherapy.

Disadvantages

Besides a long scar to the abdomen, the surgical sacrifice of the rectus abdominis muscle can result in a higher risk of medical complications of the abdominal donor-site, such as hernia, and consequent intestinal protrusion (bulging), and pain. Said conditions require the reinforcement of the woman's abdominal wall with a synthetic mesh.

Indications

The woman must be psychologically motivated to undergo such great surgical interventions (reconstruction and harvesting), and she must physically possess sufficient abdominal tissues (skin, muscle, and fat) with which to construct the replacement breast. The division of the superior epigastric blood supply, by a previous surgery, precludes a pedicled TRAM flap as the feasible method for breast reconstruction. A radical mastectomy defect (hole) requiring a great volume of replacement tissue. A medical history of radiation to the chest wall. A large opposite breast, which is difficult to match with a pectoral implant; and a. previous, failed reconstruction with a breast implant.

Contraindications

The woman is not a suitable patient for a free-flap breast reconstruction surgical procedure if she has any of the following symptoms, or a combination of these symptoms: ASA III or an ASA IV surgical-health grade, a blood coagulation disorder, an unstable psychiatric disease, a BMI > 35 obesity grade, a previous surgery that interrupted the blood supply to the TRAM flap, or contraindications to anticoagulation therapy.

==== DIEAP flap — Deep Inferior Epigastric Artery Perforator free flap ====
Technique

The design of the DIEAP free flap is like the design of the TRAM flap; yet, the DIEAP flap consists only of skin, adipose fat, and one or more perforator vessels of the deep inferior epigastric blood-vessel system. During the harvesting of the DIEAP flap from the donor site, the plastic surgeon's special consideration is preserving the entirety of the rectus abdominis muscle and its innervation .

Advantages

The surgical procedure utilizing the DIEAP free flap is less painful, and allows the woman a shorter post-operative recovery period, because the harvesting procedure preserved all of the abdominal muscles and relevant innervation. Likewise, the long-term preservation of abdominal strength reduces the risk of abdominal complications, such as hernia, intestinal bulging, and pain. The DIEAP free flap breast reconstruction can tolerate oncologic radiotherapy.

Disadvantages

The more complicated surgical technique required to harvest the DIEAP free flap does include the possibility of damaging the perforator blood vessels; a long time for the patient to be under anaesthesia; and a long surgical scar at the abdominal-tissue donor site.

Indications

The woman must be psychologically motivated to undergo such great surgical interventions (reconstruction and harvesting), and she must physically possess sufficient abdominal tissues (skin, muscle, and fat) with which to construct the replacement breast. The division of the superior epigastric blood supply, by a previous surgery, precludes a pedicled TRAM flap as the feasible method for breast reconstruction. A radical mastectomy defect (hole) requiring a great volume of replacement tissue. A medical history of radiation to the chest wall. A large opposite breast, which is difficult to match with a pectoral implant; and a previous, failed reconstruction with a breast implant.

Contraindications

The woman is not a suitable patient for a free-flap breast reconstruction surgical procedure if she has any of the following symptoms, or a combination of these symptoms: ASA III or an ASA IV surgical-health grade, a blood coagulation disorder, an unstable psychiatric disease, a BMI > 35 obesity grade, a previous surgery that interrupted the blood supply to the DIEAP free flap, or contraindications to anticoagulation therapy.

==== Free MS-TRAM — Muscle-sparing Transverse Rectus Abdominis Myocutaneous flap ====
Technique

The technique of the MS-TRAM flap is similar to the technique of the DIEAP flap, but the MS-TRAM flap is used if the perforators of the abdominal wall are located in different intramuscular layers and the muscle fibres between these vessels would need to be divided. This gives damage to the rectus muscle, necessitating a reinforcing mesh repair and causing higher chance of postoperative complications such as abdominal wall weakness, bulging or herniation. In this situation the MS-TRAM flap is performed, in which a small cuff of muscle fibres between and around the perforators is incorporated.

Advantages

Most of the muscle is preserved, reducing the chance of postoperative donor site complications and obviating the need for a synthetic mesh repair. It is a good alternative to the DIEAP flap.

Disadvantages

The same as for the DIEAP flap.

Indications

When a DIEAP flap is not possible because of unsuitable or insufficient perforators.

Contraindications

Analogue to the DIEAP flap technique.

==== SIEA — Superficial Inferior Epigastric Artery flap ====
Technique

The SIEA flap design is more or less similar to the DIEAP flap design, however, it is perfused by different blood vessels. The superficial epigastric vessels branch off the common femoral vessels in the groin area and vascularise the ipsilateral lower hemi-abdomen. Unlike the DIEAP flap the SIEA flap is not a perforator flap, because the vessels do not perforate the abdominal wall musculature. Therefore, the flap can be raised without incising the anterior rectus sheath and dissecting within the rectus muscles and thus further reducing the chance of donor site morbidity.

Advantage

Reduced chance of abdominal donor site morbidity because there is no dissection within the rectus muscle.

Disadvantages

Smaller diameter and shorter length of the vascular pedicle compared to the TRAM and DIEAP flap. The SIEA is absent or inadequate in many patients, which can only be determined during surgery. A smaller flap has to be designed because the vessels perfuse a smaller area of the lower abdomen, which may cause an inadequate size of the reconstructed breast. Long abdominal donor site scar.

Indications

The same as for DIEAP flap, and the presence of a superficial inferior epigastric artery with an adequate diameter.

Contraindications

The same as for DIEAP flap, and an absent or inadequate superficial inferior epigastric artery.

=== Buttocks ===
==== SGAP — Superior Gluteal Artery Perforator flap ====
Technique

The SGAP flap includes skin and fat from the upper buttock with one or more perforators of the superior gluteal artery and vein, which perfuse the tissue. The flap is usually harvested in the prone or lateral decubitus position necessitating turning of the patient during surgery.

Advantages

Gluteal muscles are preserved and donor site scar is hidden in underwear.

Disadvantages

A complex surgical operation; the dissection of the muscle is technically difficult, in order to obtain a workable flap, which possesses a relatively short vascularised pedicle. Intra-operatively, the patient must be rotated during the course of the procedure. There exists a possibility that the contour of the tissue donor-site could cause a deformity high upon the buttocks area; and the woman might have asymmetrical buttocks in the case of a unilateral breast reconstruction.

Indications

Unsuitable or insufficient abdominal donor site. Redundant buttock-fat and buttock-skin.

Contraindications

Insufficient buttock tissue. Damage to the perforators, because of a previous surgical operation, such as liposuction.

==== Septocutaneous GAP flap ====
Technique

The perforator of the sc-GAP flap courses between the gluteus medius and maximus muscles. Using the septocutaneous gluteal artery perforator obviates the need for intramuscular dissection.

Advantages

No intramuscular dissection necessary, making surgery easier than in traditional GAP flaps.

Disadvantages

The septocutaneous perforator is not always present; the requirement to rotate the patient during the surgery; the possibility of a donor-site contour deformity high upon the buttocks area; and an asymmetrical buttocks region in the case of a unilateral breast reconstruction.

Indications

Identical to SGAP flap.

Contraindications

The same as the SGAP flap, and the absence of a septocutaneous perforator.

==== IGAP — Inferior Gluteal Artery Perforator flap ====
Technique

Harvesting of the IGAP flap is similar to raising the SGAP flap, however, the flap is taken from the lower buttock area including one or more perforators of the inferior gluteal vessels.

Advantages

Longer vascular pedicle compared to the SGAP flap. The scar is hidden in the buttock crease.

Disadvantages

Rather tedious dissection of the flap and possibility of damage to the posterior femoral cutaneous nerve. Need to turn the patient during surgery. Scar tenderness causing problems with sitting. Visibility of the scar lateral to underwear/swimwear. Need to turn the patient during surgery. Possibility of a donor site contour deformity of the buttock area. Asymmetrical buttocks in case of a unilateral breast reconstruction.

Indications

Identical to SGAP flap.

Contraindication

The same as for SGAP flap.

=== Thigh ===
==== TMG flap/TUG flap — Transverse Myocutaneous/Upper Gracilis flap ====
Technique

The TUG flap (also the TMG flap) consists of the gracilis muscle and a transversely-oriented island of skin and fat on the superior inner thigh. Sacrifice of the gracilis muscle does not result in functional impairment. The TUG flap is nourished by the ascending branch of the medial circumflex femoral artery with two venae comitantes, which come from the profunda femoris vessels. The vessels are routinely anastomosed to the internal mammary vessels, instead of to the thoraco-dorsal vessels in the axilla, because the blood vessels of the TUG flap are relatively short.

Advantages

Relatively easy dissection of the flap. Bilateral flap harvest is possible with patient in supine position. The scar is well hidden in the groin crease. Another benefit of the surgery is the ‘inner thigh lift’ the patients receive.

Disadvantages

The flap provides a rather small skin island with a relatively thin fat pad, which makes it only possible to reconstruct small to medium-sized breasts. The small skin island also makes it a less appropriate flap for delayed breast reconstructions. Atrophy of the gracilis muscle may cause secondary volume and contour deformities of the reconstructed breast for which additional corrections may be necessary.

Indications

If there is a contraindication for an abdominal flap or in case the patient refuses an abdominal or buttock scar. Small to medium-sized breasts. Primary bilateral reconstruction after skin sparing mastectomy.

Contraindications

Large sized breasts. Patients with inadequate thigh tissue or after previous thigh lift. Delayed reconstructions.

==== PAP — Profunda Femoris Artery Perforator flap ====
Technique

The PAP flap includes skin and fat of the posterior thigh just below the gluteal crease and is nourished by the perforating vessels from the profunda femoris artery that run through the adductor magnus muscle.

Advantages

Relatively long vascular pedicle. Scar is hidden in lower buttock crease.

Disadvantages

Need to turn the patient during surgery. Scar tenderness causing problems with sitting. Visibility of the scar lateral to underwear/swimwear. Asymmetrical donor site in case of a unilateral breast reconstruction.

Indications

Unsuitable or insufficient abdominal donor site. “Pear-shaped” body.

Contraindications

Insufficient skin and fat redundancy of posterior thigh. Absence of perforator.

==== TFL — Tensor Fasciae Latae flap ====
Technique

The TFL flap reconstruction includes the tensor fasciae latae muscle and is nourished by the ascending branch of the lateral circumflex femoral artery. The tensor fasciae latae muscle is located at the lateral upper leg.

Advantages

The fascia lata covering the TFL-muscle is very thick, which makes it a good donor site for closing defects. No need to turn the patient during surgery.

Disadvantages

Vertical scar at the lateral upper leg. The amount of fat may not be enough to reconstruct an entire breast. Asymmetrical upper leg after unilateral breast reconstruction.

Indications

In case of unavailability of other potential donor sites.

Contraindications

Previous surgery at donor site. Insufficient skin and fat redundancy of lateral thigh.

==== LTTF — Lateral Transverse Thigh Free flap ====
Technique

The LTTF flap is a horizontal variant of the vertical TFL flap, nourished by the perforating vessels of either the ascending or the transverse branch of the lateral circumflex femoral artery and vein. The flap is oriented transversely on the tensor fasciae latae, also known as the “saddlebag” area.

Advantages

A rather long pedicle located at the edge of the flap, making the flap very versatile in its positioning possibilities. Flap harvest is possible with patient in the prone position. Relatively easy flap dissection. Generally there is a good internal projection of the flap without the need for folding or tucking.

Disadvantages

The donor-site scar might be more aesthetically objectionable than that of another free-flap breast reconstruction technique. Some women might possess insufficient tissue at the donor site. Generally, there is less overlying skin available for effecting the transfer. Asymmetrical hips after unilateral breast reconstruction.

Indications

Patients with insufficient abdominal wall tissue and large saddlebags, who accept the scar and the donor site deformity. In case other free flaps are not possible.

Contraindications

Analogous to the TFL-flap technique.

==== ALT — Anterolateral Thigh flap ====
Technique

The ALT flap consists of skin and subcutaneous fat of the anterolateral thigh just above the knee. The vessels nourishing the ALT flap are the perforators of the descending branch of the lateral circumflex femoral artery and veins.

Advantages

Usually there is a large amount of fat at this donor site. Muscle sparing surgery. No need to turn the patient during surgery. Long vascular pedicle.

Disadvantages

The vertical and rather conspicuous donor scar may be more objectionable. Asymmetrical upper leg after unilateral breast reconstruction.

Indications

Patient preference. In case other free flaps are not possible.

Contraindications

Unsuitable donor site.

=== Waist ===
==== DCIA — Deep Circumflex Iliac Artery Free flap, or "Rubens flap" ====
Technique

The Rubens flap consists of the peri-iliac fat pad which is based on the deep circumflex iliac artery and vein. The flap pedicle is 5–6 cm. long and the blood vessels are approximately 2.5 mm. in diameter.

Advantages

The length and calibre of the vascular pedicle of the flap are usually sufficient. Bilateral reconstruction is possible. Flap dissection is possible with the patient in prone position. The donor-site defect appears to be more acceptable than with the LTTF flap and in selected cases it can even be less conspicuous than the donor site of an abdominal based flap.

Disadvantages

The Deep Circumflex Iliac Artery Free flap is technically more difficult than the TRAM flap, and shaping the new breast seems more challenging than with the TRAM or gluteal flap because of its fusiform shape. Asymmetrical donor site after unilateral breast reconstruction. The blood supply to the flap is less robust and sometimes the deep circumflex iliac vein is small, making venous anastomosis required to transfer the flap more difficult. Part of the donor site scar may be visible in swimsuit. Improper reinsertion of donor site muscles on the iliac crest can cause postoperative complications, like a hernia. Also, nerve paresthesias are possible.

Indication

The Rubens flap is indicated if a TRAM flap is not possible because of a previous abdominal surgery or if the patient does not accept an abdominal scar.

Contraindication

Insufficient skin and fat redundancy at donor site.

==== LAP — Lumbar Artery Perforator flap ====
Technique

The LAP flap is a flap from the dorsal lumbar area extending to the lateral edge of the rectus abdominis muscle which consists of fat, skin and one paravertebral perforator from the lumbar vessels. The lumbar vessels travel through the erector spinae muscles or between the erector spinae muscle and quadratus lumborum muscle. Preoperatively, the perforators are located using a hand held doppler. The vessels are cut at the beginning of the vasa lumbales.

Advantage

Large flap.

Disadvantages

Flap harvest in prone position necessitating turning of the patient during the operation. Not in all cases a suitable perforator is available.

Indication

In case other free flaps are not possible.

Contraindications

Insufficient or unsuitable perforator. Insufficient skin and fat redundancy at donor site.

== Recovery ==
Medication may be prescribed post-surgery to relieve pain and drains may be placed at the surgical wound to remove fluids. A support bra or elastic bandage is often recommended to decrease swelling and support healing.

== See also ==
- List of plastic surgery flaps
- Breast reconstruction
- Free flap
- Flap (surgery)
