= Operating table =

Table on which a patient lies during a surgical operation

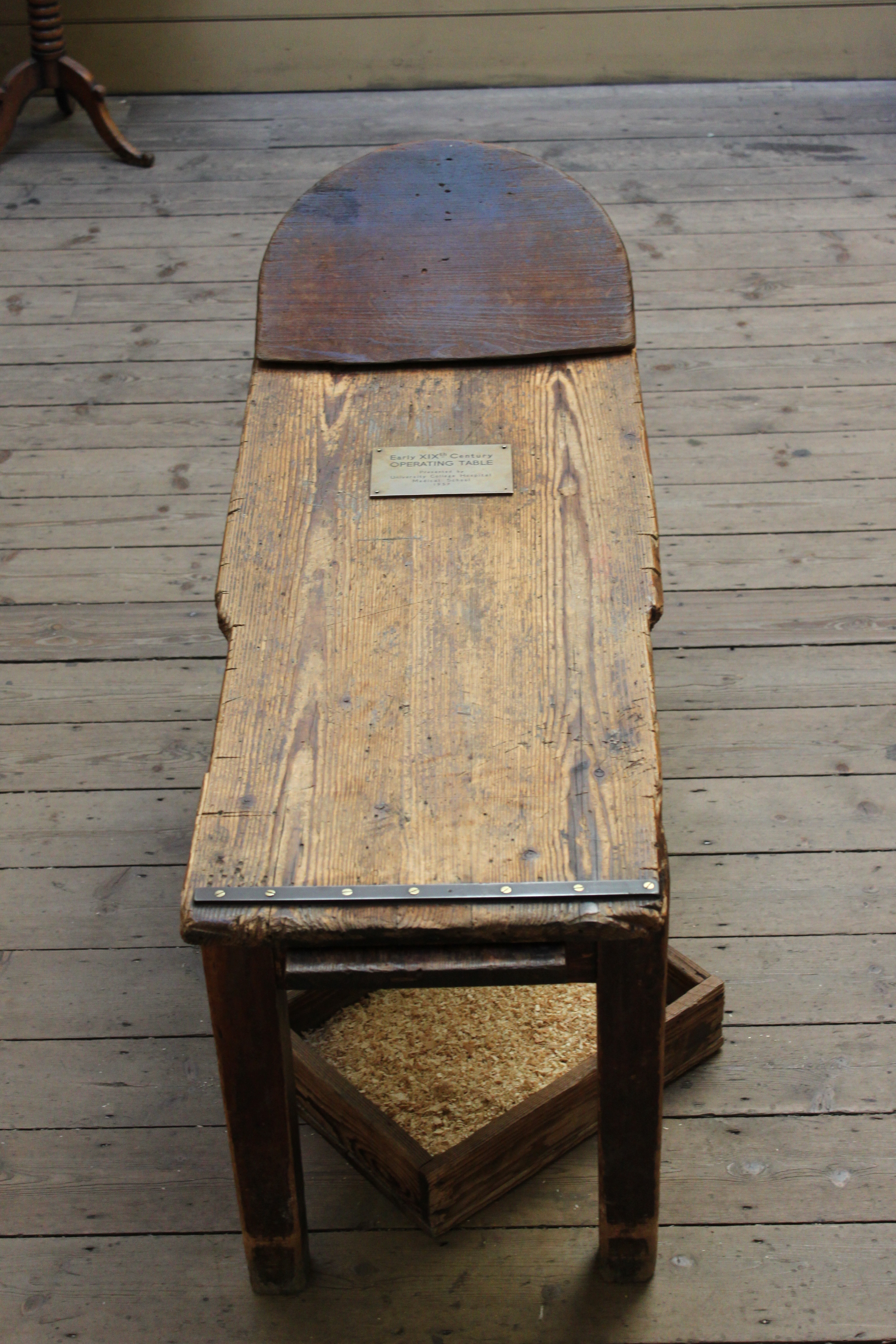
A 19th-century operating table.

An operating table, sometimes called operating room table, is the table on which the patient lies during a surgical operation. This surgical equipment is usually found inside the surgery room of a hospital. A specialized type of operating table, called a surgical fracture table (or trauma table), is designed to allow an orthopedic surgeon to perform common orthopedic procedures such as hip fractures, pelvic fractures, tibial fractures, fibula fractures, and anterior approach total hip arthroplasty.

== Definition ==
=== Two main classifications: system and mobile ===
An operating table system is basically made up of three components: an operating table column, the table top and the transporter. Modern operating table systems are available as both stationary and mobile units. There are a wide range of table tops that can be used for both general surgery and for specialist disciplines. Mobile operating tables, however, tend to be equipped with a specific discipline in mind. The base, column and table top form a unit.

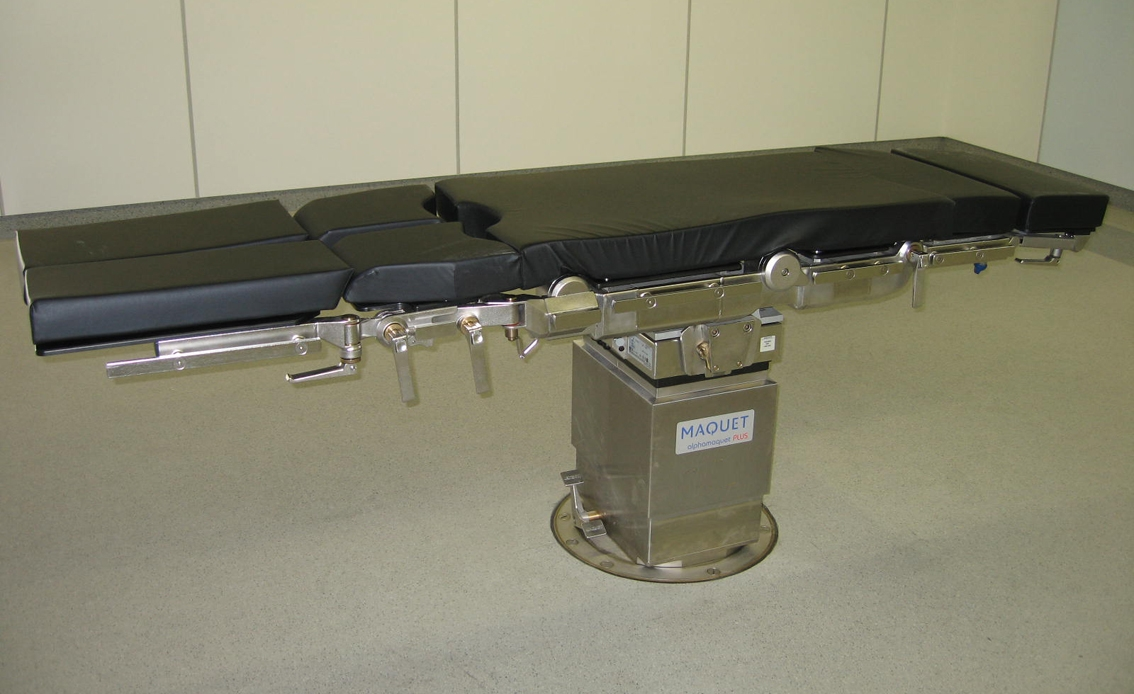
Operating table system with a stationary unit

Since the table column for a stationary operating table system is firmly anchored to the floor, the additional necessary medical devices can easily be brought to the operating area and positioned. These devices include, for example, x-ray equipment, which can easily be slid under the table top. For personnel, the system offers improved leg space since disruptive foot geometry is no longer present.

Additional elements can be adapted to the operating table. This flexibility is very important since it enables the table to be adapted to suit the relevant patient or the surgical discipline.

The advantage of the mobile operating table, on the other hand, is that the position of the table can be changed within the operating room. However, the foot of the table limits the leg space available to the surgical team. The individual segments of the table top can be easily removed and replaced. They also permit x-rays and conduct electricity.

Another special feature of the operating table system is the ability to use appropriate interface modules to establish communication with diagnostics systems, for example, angiography, MR and CT. This is only possible with stationary columns since the systems require a fixed point.

== Properties and requirements made of an operating table ==
There are a number of basic functions that every operating table must fulfill in order to meet the requirements made of it. For example, the height of an operating table must be adjustable. This is the only way a surgeon can adapt it to their height and thus work ergonomically. In addition it must be possible to tilt the table to the left and to the right to ensure a better overview into body cavities or to use gravity to move organs (e.g. laparoscopy). In addition, the individual operating table segments must also be adjustable. This is the only way to ensure the necessary anatomical bends of the body and enable extremities to be positioned suitable for operating. A further property of the operating table top is radiolucency. The radiolucent surface should be as large as possible to ensure the largest possible image without disruption. The padding of the table is also important, this must be both soft and radiolucent. Soft because it must distribute the pressure optimally otherwise the patient may suffer pressure ulcers which staff may be liable for.

== Comparison: Operating table system and mobile operating table ==
The operating table system has a number of advantages. Transport is easier since this unit is generally firmly secured to the floor and thus the foot and column of the unit no longer need to be transported. In addition, the transporter has light and large casters which are gentle not just to the floor. The entire operating area is more hygienic since the casters are not attached to the system, like on a mobile operating table. These are hard to clean and more unhygienic as a result. The operating table column can be rotated by 360° and offers ideal space for the feet of the team. The table top is, thanks to the use of x-ray-capable materials, almost completely radiolucent. The universal operating table is available as both stationary, mobile and moveable units. A mobile operating table is, however, used as a special table. The table top cannot be removed or replaced. Operation may, according to version, be manual, pedal or motorized.

== Operating table positions ==
Patients may suffer pressure ulcers as a result of lying incorrectly on an operating table or lying on an operating table for too long. Nursing staff and doctors try to prevent this from happening. Typical standard positions are, for example, back, stomach, side, Trendelenburg and a seated/half-seated position. The patient should always be positioned or optimally positioned in cooperation with the anaesthetist, surgeon and operating room staff. Prior to the operation, the decision must be made as to exactly how the patient is to be positioned. This decision not only takes account of the type of operation, it also considers the age, weight and health of the patient with regard to the heart, lungs, circulation, metabolism, blood circulation problems etc.

== Advantages of an operating table system ==
Unlike a mobile operating table which is usually employed in hospitals with small operating departments, for example, in ambulant operating rooms, modern operating table systems are characterized by their great mobility. They also have special table tops designed for a variety of surgical disciplines and, thanks to the ability to change these tops, they enable versatile use of an operating room. An operating table system with a stationary column is more stable and more hygienic. The better transport options improve the patient flow from the patient transfer unit and the operating room considerably. Finally, operating table systems with stationary columns enables control elements to be integrated into image procedures, for example, angiography, MR and CT.

== Literature ==
1. Kramme, Rüdiger: Medizintechnik. 3. Edition. Heidelberg 2007, P. 830-831
2. Schindler, Herbert: Arbeitsgebiet Operationssaal. Lagerungen, Hygiene, Gefahren. Stuttgart 1985, P. 26
3. Aschemann, Dirk: OP-Lagerungen für Fachpersonal. Heidelberg 2009, Figure P. 53-56
