= Rotation flap =

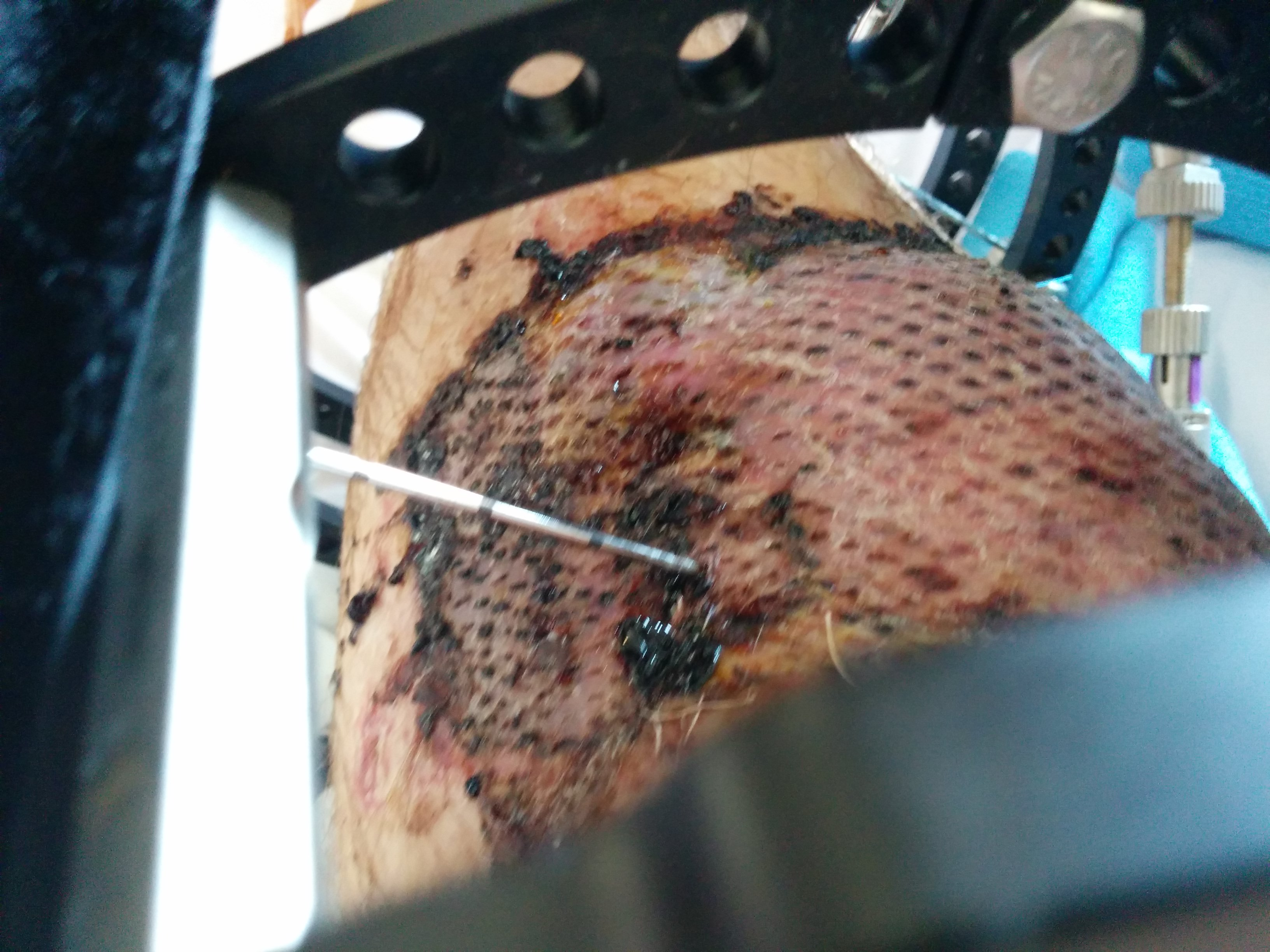
Gastrocnemius rotational skin flap for injury to anterior aspect of lower leg 10 days after surgery

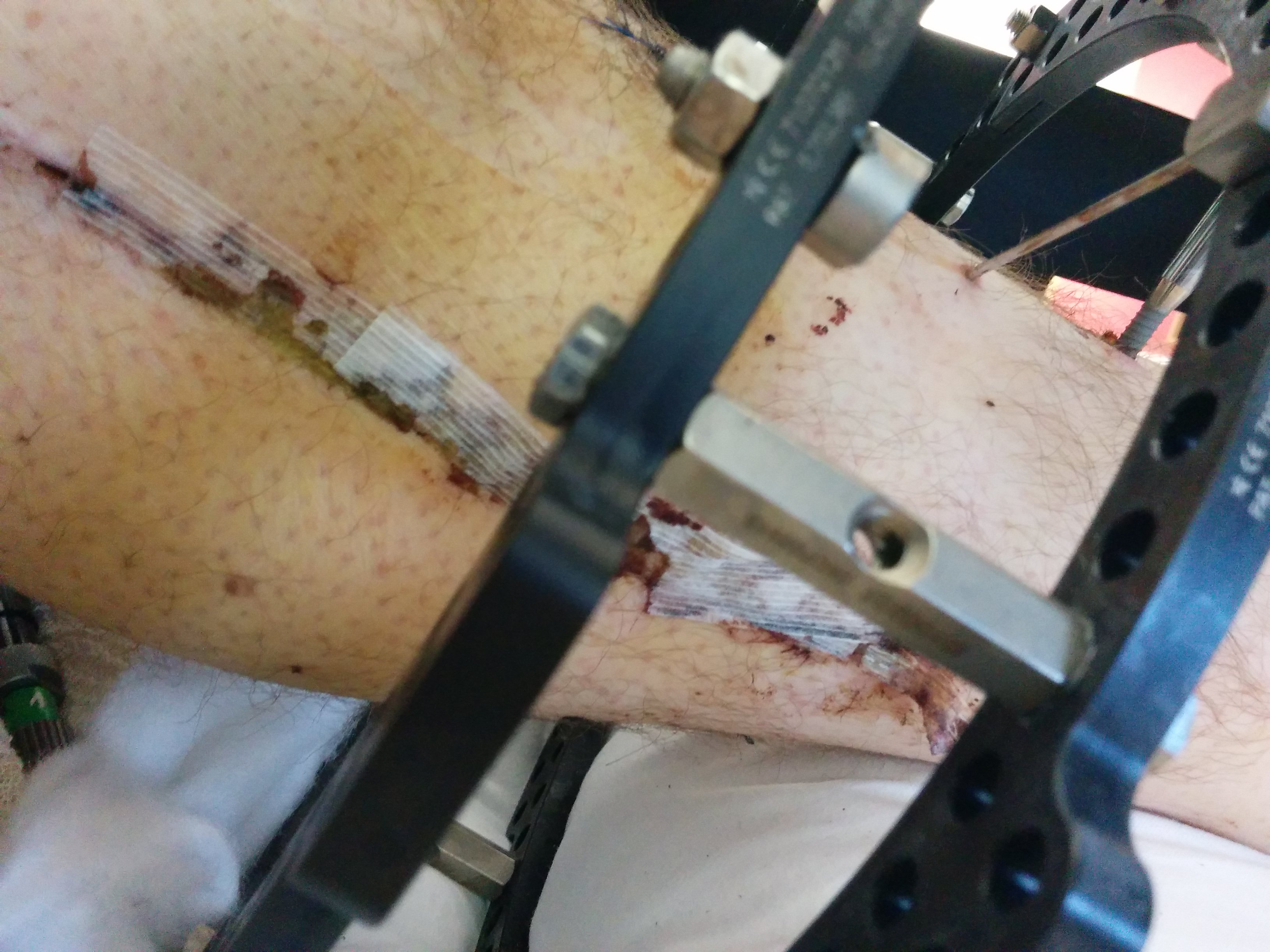
Incision for gastrocnemius rotational flap

Rotational flap

A rotation flap is a semicircular skin flap that is rotated into the defect on a fulcrum point. Rotation flaps provide the ability to mobilize large areas of tissue with a wide vascular base for reconstruction. The flap must be adequately large, and a large base is necessary if a back-cut will be needed to lengthen the flap. If the flap is too small, the residual defect can be covered by mobilizing the surrounding tissue.

A drawback of rotation flaps is the extended cutting and undermining needed to create the flap, thus increasing the risk of hemorrhage and nerve damage.

This term is often used in contrast with the term "free flap" where the transferred tissue is completely detached.

== See also ==
- Flap (surgery)
- Free flap
- Perforator flaps
- List of plastic surgery flaps
