= Angiosome =

Area of the body served by one artery

An angiosome is a three-dimensional unit of skin and underlying tissues vascularized by a source artery, termed an arteriosome and drained by a vein termed a venosome. It is a concept that is used by plastic surgeons, and other medical disciplines like CMF, ENT, etc., for the design and harvesting of free flap transplants (e.g. fibula free-flap transplant), and by vascular surgeons and interventional radiologists for the endovascular treatment of critical limb ischemia. It is an alternative model to the traditional "best vessel" model.

An example is the angiosome of the fibular artery (also called the peroneal artery), that primarily vascularizes the skin of the distal two-thirds of the lateral-posterior aspect of the leg. Furthermore, also the underlying fibula bone and parts of the local muscles, like the flexor hallucis longus muscle.

Small arteries, called arterial perforators, branch off from the larger arteries below the deep body fascia. These arterial perforators penetrate the deep body fascia in their course towards the skin and further ramify in the subcutaneous tissue. A three-dimensional unit of tissue, only encompassing skin and the subcutaneous tissue – but not the tissue from below the body fascia (like muscle and bone) – primarily supplied by a dominant arterial perforator, is called a perforasome. Although multiple other arterial perforators may also supply this unit of tissue with arterial blood, it is the dominant arterial perforator that is essential for the survival of the perforasome.

Arterial perforators can be further defined by their path, in three categories: direct-cutaneous perforator, septo-cutaneous perforator and musculo-cutaneous perforator, depending on what anatomical structure the perforator progresses through, after branching from the deep source artery.

Therefore, generally speaking, one “big” angiosome can contain multiple “smaller” perforasomes.
