= Perforator flaps =

Technique used in reconstructive surgery

Perforator flap surgery is a technique used in reconstructive surgery where skin and/or subcutaneous fat are removed from a distant or adjacent part of the body to reconstruct the excised part. The vessels that supply blood to the flap are isolated perforator(s) derived from a deep vascular system through the underlying muscle or intermuscular septa. Some perforators can have a mixed septal and intramuscular course before reaching the skin. The name of the particular flap is retrieved from its perforator and not from the underlying muscle. If there is a potential to harvest multiple perforator flaps from one vessel, the name of each flap is based on its anatomical region or muscle. For example, a perforator that only traverses through the septum to supply the underlying skin is called a septal perforator. Whereas a flap that is vascularised by a perforator traversing only through muscle to supply the underlying skin is called a muscle perforator. According to the distinct origin of their vascular supply, perforators can be classified into direct and indirect perforators. Direct perforators only pierce the deep fascia, they don't traverse any other structural tissue. Indirect perforators first run through other structures before piercing the deep fascia.

== Overview ==
Soft tissue defects due to trauma or after tumor extirpation are important medical and cosmetic topics. Therefore, reconstructive surgeons have developed a variety of surgical techniques to conceal the soft tissue defects by using tissue transfers, better known as flaps. In the course of time these flaps have rapidly evolved from "random-pattern flaps with an unknown blood supply, through axial-pattern flaps with a known blood supply to muscle and musculocutaneous perforator flaps" for the sole purpose of optimal reconstruction with minimum donor-site morbidity. Koshima and Soeda were the first to use the name "perforator flaps" in 1989 and since then perforator flaps have become more popular in reconstructive microsurgery. Thus perforator flaps, using autologous tissue with preservation of fascia, muscle and nerve represent the future of flaps. The most frequently used perforator flaps nowadays are the deep inferior epigastric perforator flap (DIEP flap), and both the superior and inferior gluteal (SGAP/ IGAP) flap, all three mainly used for breast reconstruction; the lateral circumflex femoral artery perforator (LCFAP) flap (previously named anterolateral thigh or ALT flap) and the thoracodorsal artery perforator (TAP) flap, mainly for the extremities and the head and neck region as a free flap and for breast and thoracic wall reconstruction as a pedicled perforator flap.

== Classification ==
Perforator flaps can be classified in many different ways. Regarding the distinct origin of their blood supply and the structures they cross before they pierce the deep fascia, perforators can either be direct perforators or indirect perforators. We will discuss this classification based on the perforators' anatomy below.

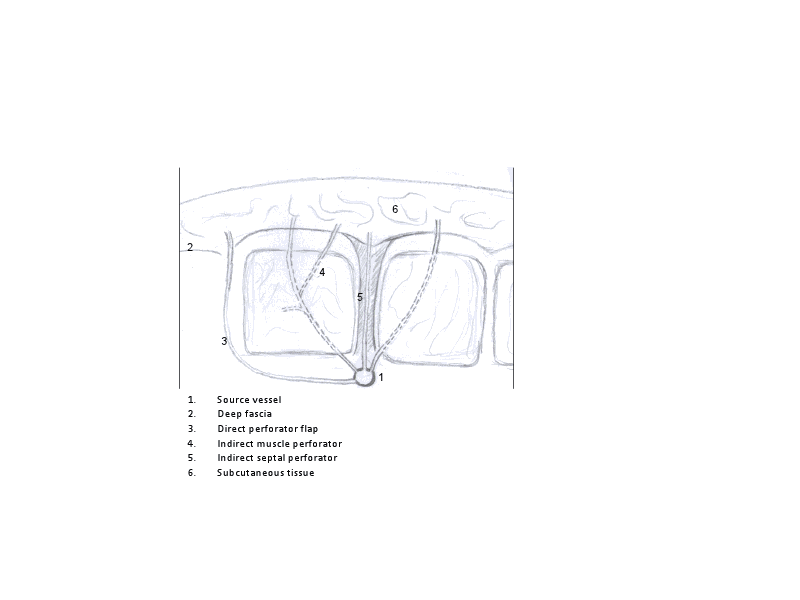
Direct and indirect perforators

=== Direct cutaneous ===
Direct cutaneous perforators only perforate the deep fascia, they do not traverse any other structural tissue.

It is questionable whether these perforators are true perforators, because it might be more logical to not include these perforators. The surgical approach needed for direct perforators is slightly different from the one needed for indirect perforators. When direct perforators are not included, surgeons can focus on the anatomy of the perforator and the source vessel.

=== Indirect cutaneous ===
Indirect cutaneous perforators traverse other structures before going through the deep fascia. These other structures are deeper tissues, and consist of mainly muscle, septum or epimysium. According to the clinical relevance, two types of indirect cutaneous perforators need to be distinguished. We will clarify these two types below.

==== Muscle and musculocutaneous ====
Musculocutaneous perforators supply the overlying skin by traversing through muscle before they pierce the deep fascia.

A perforator which traverses muscle before piercing the deep fascia can do that either transmuscular or transepimysial. This latter subdivision is however not taken into account during the dissection of the perforator. Only the size, position, and course of the perforator vessel are considered then.

When a flaps' blood supply depends on a muscle perforator, this flap is called a muscle perforator flap.

==== Septal and septocutaneous ====
Septocutaneous perforators supply the overlying skin by traversing through an intermuscular septum before they pierce the deep fascia. These perforators are cutaneous side branches of muscular vessels and perforators.

When a flap's blood supply depends on a septal perforator, this flap is called a septal perforator flap.

=== Nomenclature ===
Due to confusion about the definition and nomenclature of perforator flaps, a consensus meeting was held in Gent, Belgium, on September 29, 2001. Regarding the nomenclature of these flaps, the authors stated the following:

"A perforator flap should be named after the nutrient artery or vessels and not after the underlying muscle. If there is a potential to harvest multiple perforator flaps from one vessel, the name of each flap should be based on its anatomical region or muscle."

This so-called 'gent consensus' was needed because the lack of definitions and standard rules on terminology created confusion in communication between surgeons.

== Method of application ==
Flaps can be transferred either free or pedicled. Regarding the nomenclature, one is free to add the type of transfer to the name of a flap.

=== Free perforator flaps ===
A free flap is defined as a tissue mass that has been taken away from the original site to be used in tissue transplantation. When a surgeon uses a free flap, the blood supply is cut and the pedicle reattached to recipient vessels, performing a microsurgical anastomosis.

For more information on free flaps, see also free flap.

=== Pedicled perforator flaps ===
Pedicled perforator flaps can be transferred either by translation or rotation. These two types will be discussed separately below.

==== Translation ====
This type of transfer is also called "advancement".The surgeon disconnects the flap from the body, except for the perforators. After this procedure, the flap is advanced into the defect.

==== Rotation ====
The subgroup of pedicled perforator flaps, transferred in the defect by rotation is the so-called "propeller flap". Confusion concerning definition, nomenclature and classification of propeller flaps led to a consensus meeting similar to the "gent consensus meeting". The consensus that was reached is named "the tokyo consensus". This article stipulates the definitions of propeller flaps and especially perforator propeller flaps. The definition that was set up is cited below:

"A propeller flap can be defined as an "island flap that reaches the recipient site through an axial rotation." Every skin island flap can become a propeller flap. However, island flaps that reach the recipient site through an advancement movement and flaps that move through a rotation but are not completely islanded are excluded from this definition. "

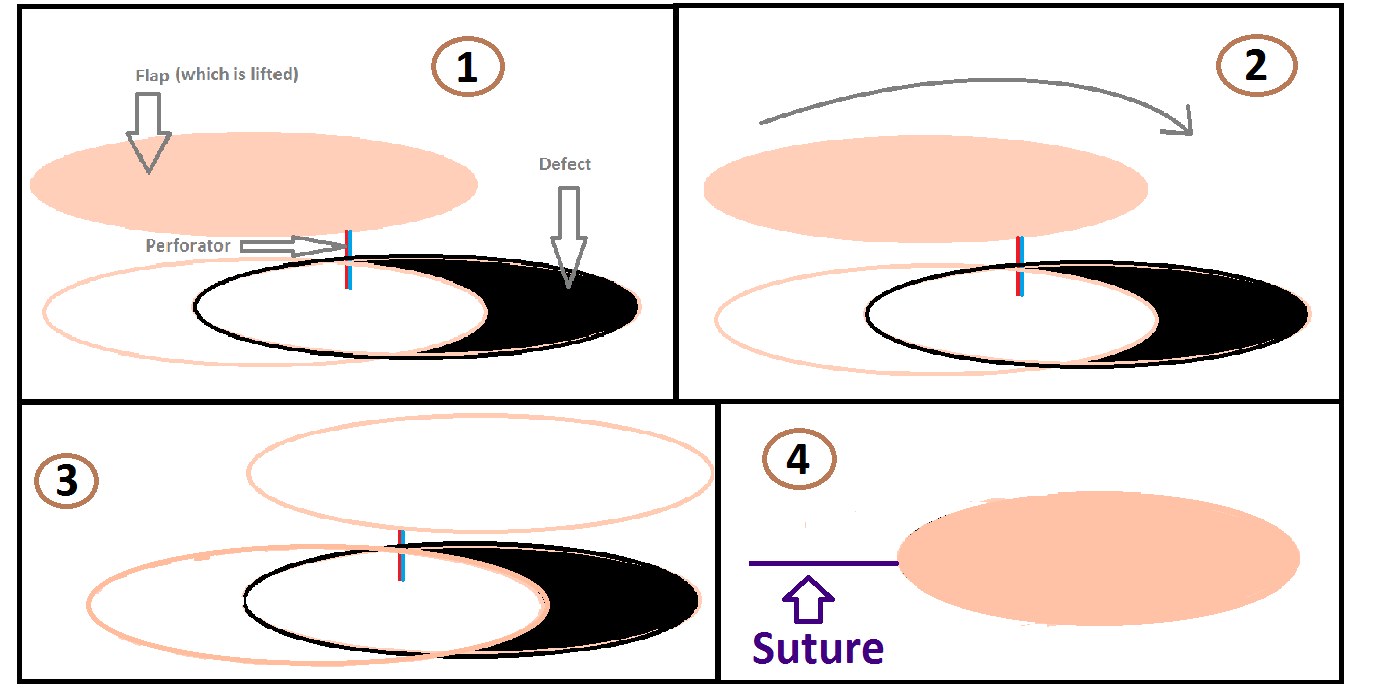
Propeller flap

Regarding the classification of propeller flaps, the surgeon should specify several aspects of these flaps. It is important that the type of nourishing pedicle, the degree of skin island rotation and, when possible, the artery of origin of the perforator vessel are mentioned.

The perforator propeller flap is the propeller flap which is used most commonly. It is a perforator flap with a skin island, which is separated in a larger and smaller paddle by the nourishing perforator. These paddles can rotate around the perforator (pedicle), for as many degrees as the anatomical situation requires (90-180 degrees). This flap looks like a propeller when the two paddles are not too different in size.

== Fields of application ==
Trauma, oncological treatments or pressure ulcers can result in severe tissue defects. Those defects can be covered and closed by using autologe tissue transposition. The fact that each tissue defect is different makes it necessary for each tissue defect to be assessed individually. The choice of the type of tissue transposition depends on the location, nature, extent and status of the deformity.

However, the health of the patient and possible contra-indications play an important role as well. Due to the development and improvement of cutaneous, myocutanous and fasciocutaneous tissue transpositions plastic surgeons are able to successfully restore the defect to its original shape. Nevertheless, functional recovery is not guaranteed in all patients. For the optimal renewal of shape and function, a suitable flap can be chosen to reconstruct the defect. In the case of using a so-called perforator flap, a reliable vascularization and the possibility of sensory (re) innervation can be combined with less donor-site morbidity and limited loss of function in the donor area.

=== Oncological background ===
The surgical removal of both benign and malignant tumors often result in serious tissue defects involving not only soft tissue but also parts of the bone. Depending on the location aneligible flap can be selected. In breast reconstruction for example, perforator flaps have raised the standard by replacing like with like. When taking breast reconstruction into consideration, several surgical options are available to achieve lasting natural results with decreased donor-site deformities. The broad option of donor-sites makes practically all patients candidates for autogenous perforator flap reconstruction. Some examples include, Deep inferior epigastric perforator flap (DIEP flap), superior gluteal (SGAP) flaps and inferior gluteal (IGAP) flaps.

=== Traumatic background ===
Treatment of tissue defects caused after a trauma present major surgical challenges especially those of the upper and lower limb, due to the fact that they often not only cause damage to the skin but also to bones, muscles/tendons, vessels and/or nerves.

If there is extensive destruction a fasciotomy is needed, therefore it is generally accepted that the best way to cover these types of tissue defects is a free flap transplantation. Nevertheless, over the years surgeons have tried to increase the application of perforator flaps, due to their proven advantages. In the case of upper limb surgery, perforator flaps are successfully used in minor and major soft tissue defects provided that in major defects the flap is precisely planed.

In lower limb surgery there have also been reports of successful use of perforator flaps.

== Advantages and disadvantages ==
Twenty three years after the first perforator flap was described by Koshima and Soeda, there has been a significant step towards covering tissue defects by using only cutaneous tissue. Results obtained from studies done on musculocutaneous and septocutaneous perforator flaps have shown a reduction of donor-site morbidity to a minimum due to refined perforator flap techniques that allow collection of tissue without scarifying the underlying muscles. As a matter of fact, preventing damage to the underlying muscle including its innervation, has led to less cases of abdominal hernia, the absence of postoperative muscle atrophy and a better vascularised and functioning donor muscle. Furthermore, patients have shown decreased postoperative pain and accelerated rehabilitation Nevertheless, there will always be a chance that the displaced tissue partially or completely dies considering the fact that the perfusion of the flap is difficult to assess intraoperatively. Furthermore, when using this technique additional scars are made. Thus considering the complexity and length of this procedure microsurgical expertise is required and patients need to undergo a longer period of anesthetics that of course could result in increased risk factors. Microsurgical expertise in perforator flap dissection can be acquired using perforator flap training models in living tissue.

== Indications and contra-indications ==
Indications:

- the need to cover exposed vital components such as tendons, vessels, joint surfaces and bone free from periosteum
- the need to reestablish function
- the need to restore structure and shape, like after a mastectomy

Contraindications:

Associated with the patient:

- condition that could be harmful to the patients' life (critically ill, sepsis, peripheral vascular disease and renal disease)
- condition that enlarge the possibility of reconstructive failure (peripheral vascular disease and renal disease)
- patient' s ability to withstand sustained anesthesia (severe respiratory disease is an absolute contraindication)

=== Relative contra-indications ===
Any condition that probably increases the risk of intraoperative or postoperative complications:

- cardiovascular disease
- diabetes mellitus
- Raynaud syndrome
- scleroderma
- other collagen vascular diseases
- smoking
- radiation
- ongoing infections

By inducing thrombogenic state through vasoconstriction of the microvasculature, tobacco influences blood flow, wound healing and the survival of pedicled flaps. On the contrary there is no published data on damaging effects of cigarette smoke on free tissue transfer.

== Examples of perforator flaps ==
- Deep inferior epigastric perforator flap (DIEP flap)
- Thoracodorsal artery perforator (TAP) flap
- Superior gluteal (SGAP) flaps
- Inferior gluteal (IGAP) flaps

== See also ==
- Flap (surgery)
- DIEP flap
- List of plastic surgery flaps
- Breast reconstruction
- Free flap
