= Nipple prosthesis =

External breast prostheses

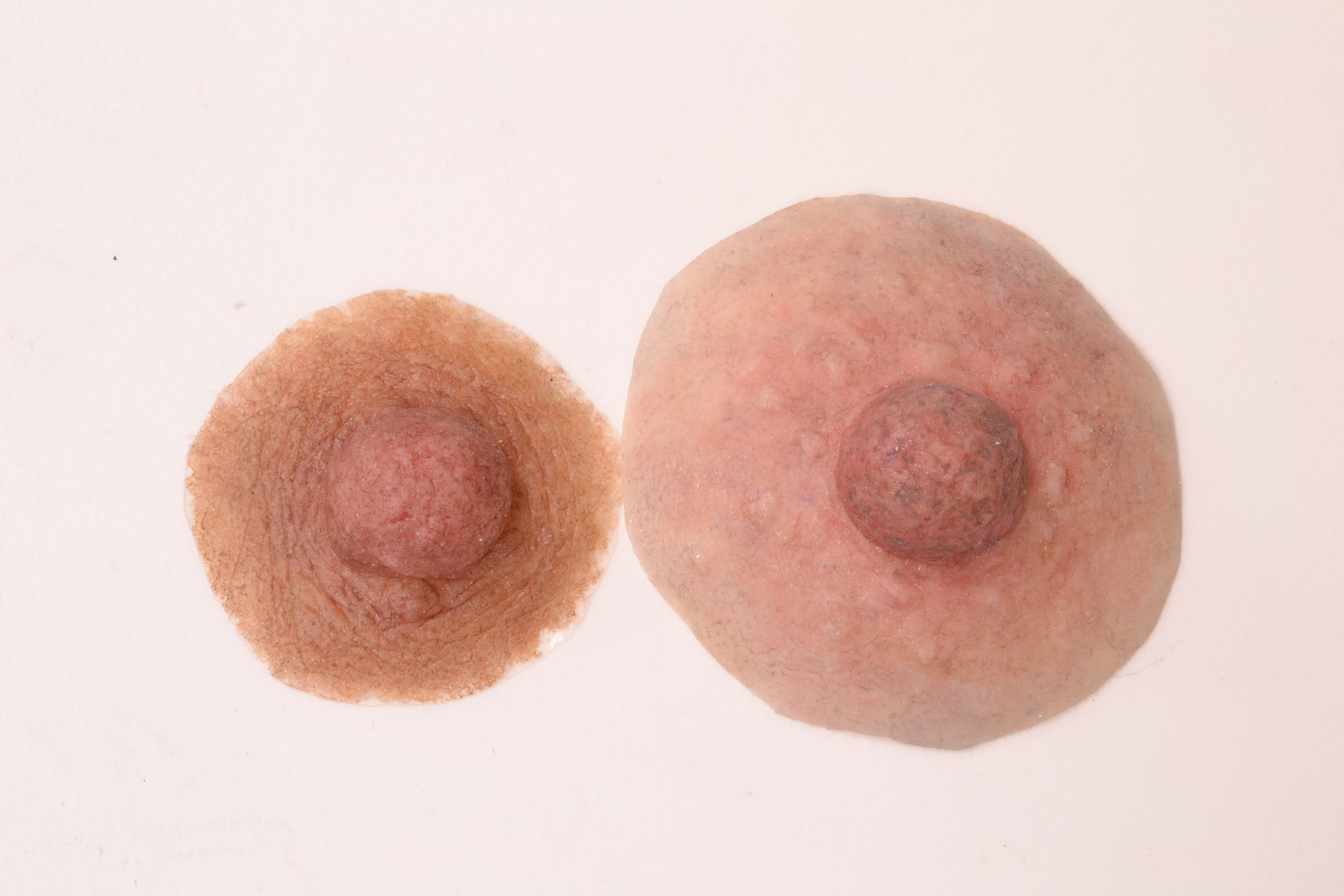
Examples of custom nipple prostheses

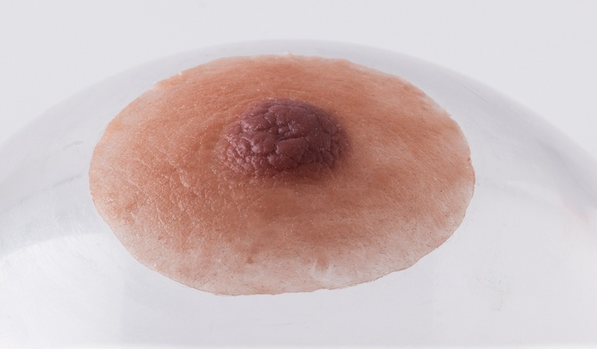
Nipple Prosthesis

Nipple/Areola prostheses (prostheses is the plural of prosthesis) are made of silicone by breast prosthesis manufacturers and anaplastologists for breast cancer survivors who were treated for breast cancer with a mastectomy. Prostheses can be worn weeks after a mastectomy, breast reconstruction, or even nipple reconstruction. As an inexpensive and convenient alternative to surgery, patients may choose to wear them anytime during treatment. Patients who ultimately find nipple prostheses thought that they should be informed of them during the consultation prior to mastectomy.

== Fabrication ==
Nipple prosthetics are made of silicone and are adhered to the skin. There are several different types of prostheses with different benefits and costs.

- Mass-produced and "semi-custom" prostheses allow women to choose from a few colors and sizes. The majority of mass-produced prostheses are self-adhering and last three months because the materials are weaker and the adhesion become weaker. Lack of projection, color match, shape, size, and texture are all among the common complaints of mass-produced prostheses. Despite these complaints, mass-produced prostheses have shown some benefit. When given to patients for a three-month period between breast mount reconstruction and surgical NAC reconstruction, some patients actually preferred using the prostheses for dress purposes rather than to undergo an additional operation. Mass-produced nipple prosthetics fail to meet satisfaction expectations in cases of single mastectomies.
- Custom prostheses can be made any size, shape, or color to the specification of the individual in need and some can last for years. In the case of a single mastectomy, a prosthetic NAC can be made to match the contralateral side. Most patients are highly satisfied with size, color, and projection. Recent improvements (circa 2010) in fabrication resolve most of the major challenges with NAC surgical outcomes, such as nipple projection and areolar color. The prosthetic nipple can be air-filled and deflate when garments such as a bra or tank top are worn, and inflate when no garments are worn. In unilateral cases, women may choose to have an exact match to their contralateral NAC, or they may have a prosthesis that covers the natural NAC and matches the prosthesis on the reconstructed breast.

== Benefits ==
The physical and emotional scars of breast cancer remain with survivors every day. Women worry less about their appearance and more about cancer recurrence and mortality. Such emotional distress can have a profound impact on living. The emotional devastation of breast cancer and a life sparring mastectomy for women can affect self-appearance, self-confidence, and most certainly intimacy. Approximately 30% of women that had a mastectomy have a decreased desire for sex, which is related to self-appearance and self-confidence, and may or may not be related to her partner's attraction. A healthy intimate relationship with a spouse resonates with posterity and creates a happy and loving environment for the family.

Although NAC prosthetics have been around for decades, few patients are informed of the option since surgeons recommend surgery for reconstruction instead of prosthetics. Many breast surgeons and plastic surgeons have yet to even see mass-produced nipple prostheses, let alone custom nipple prostheses. Reconstruction of the breast mound is very common after surgical treatment for advanced breast cancer and significantly contributes to the psychosocial well-being and rehabilitation of the breast cancer survivor. Following a mastectomy, body image is more positive with reconstruction. Breast reconstruction alone falls short of its restorative potential. The nipple-areolar complex (NAC) is extremely important to women, which is why so many women would like a nipple-sparing mastectomy even though the nipple renders insensate after surgery. Nipple prostheses can provide this benefit even in situations that nipple reconstruction and tattooing cannot. Generally speaking, women with only breast mound reconstruction do not have a difference in self-appearance with clothing compared to women with breast mound and nipple reconstruction. However, women with a reconstructed NAC are more content with their nude appearance than women with only breast mound reconstruction. These women also were happier with erotic breast sensation and tissue softness than women with only breast mounds. There is also a psychological benefit of creating the NAC after the surgical reconstruction of the breast. Women with breast mound surgery and nipple reconstruction report an overall greater satisfaction with breast reconstruction, regarding the size, softness, and sexual sensitivity of the breast. Similar benefits are achievable with nipple prosthetics.

== Challenges ==
Mass-produced nipple prostheses have been around and readily available for many years. Accessibility, for custom nipple prosthetics, remains a challenge although some manufacturers are beginning to provide services remotely using impression kits, color samples, and photographs.

In the past, the greatest complaint with prosthetics is not having secure adherence. When prostheses are not adhered securely, satisfaction of prostheses is significantly decreased. In a survey conducted approximately two years after receiving the prostheses, only 67% of respondents "benefited" and only 39% still used them. Adhesion of prostheses depends greatly on the materials and fabrication techniques. Presently common are self-adhering prostheses (mass-produced) which adhere well initially, but the adhesion weakens over a few months. Another common method of adhesion is to apply an organic based pressure sensitive adhesive to the prosthesis for each use. However, removing the adhesive is difficult and can easily tear the thin edges of the prosthesis. Most promising though is a fabrication technique where the silicone prostheses are bonded to a thin layer of polyurethane. A water-based acrylic rubber adhesive is applied to the polyurethane, and the prostheses could be adhered to the skin for up to two weeks at a time. Removing the adhesive from the prostheses is fairly simple and is done with an alcohol swab. The edges of the prostheses remain thin and durable due to the polyurethane layer. Additionally, the water-based adhesive is gentle on the skin and is indicated for irradiated skin.
