= Flat closure after mastectomy =

Medical procedure

Aesthetic flat closure after mastectomy is contouring of the chest wall after mastectomy without traditional breast reconstruction. Vernacular synonyms and related vernacular and technical terms include "going flat", "flat closure", "optimal flat closure", "nonreconstructive mastectomy", "oncoplastic mastectomy", "non-skin sparing mastectomy", "mastectomy without reconstruction", and "aesthetic primary closure post-mastectomy".

Women who have decided against traditional reconstructive surgery following mastectomy have gained media visibility in recent years. Media reports have covered patients' claims that their choices not to undergo reconstruction have been overridden by their surgeons. Recent research has characterized the "going flat" movement and patient experience going flat and described aesthetic flat closure surgical technique.

Aesthetic flat closure is the surgical work required to produce a smooth flat chest wall contour after the removal of one or both breasts, including obliteration of the inframammary fold and excision of excess lateral tissue (to avoid "dog ears.") It is defined by the National Cancer Institute as the following: "A type of surgery that is done to rebuild the shape of the chest wall after one or both breasts are removed. An aesthetic flat closure may also be done after removal of a breast implant that was used to restore breast shape. During an aesthetic flat closure, extra skin, fat, and other tissue in the breast area are removed. The remaining tissue is then tightened and smoothed out so that the chest wall appears flat."
