= Free flap =

Transfer of patient's own tissue from donor site to a recipient site

Free flap, free autologous tissue transfer or microvascular free tissue transfer is a specialized surgical flap that is autotransplanted from one site of the body to another, carrying its own set of blood supply. The term "free" implies that the flap tissue (along with its blood vessels) is completely detached (severed) from the original location (i.e. "donor site"), transferred to another location (i.e. "recipient site"), and the perfusion to the tissue re-established (revascularized) by microsurgical reanastomosis of the artery(s) and vein(s) at the new site. This is in contrast to a conventional local or regional flap where the flap remains partly attached to the donor site via a "pedicle" and simply transposed (pulled or rotated) to a new location, and the blood supply to the flap primarily comes from the same vessels that perfused it at the donor site. It is also different to a graft in that the latter does not come with its own blood supply and rely completely on neovascularization at the recipient site to stay viable.

Free flap is performed extensively in plastic and reconstructive surgery. Various types of tissue may be transferred as a "free flap" including skin with subcutaneous tissue (the latter's presence distinguishes it from a skin graft), fat, muscle, nerve, bone, cartilage (or any combination of these), lymph nodes and intestinal segments. An example of "free flap" could be a "free toe transfer" in which the great toe or the second toe is transferred to the hand to reconstruct a missing thumb.

== Indications ==
Free flaps are used to reconstruct tissue defects. Particularly when postoperative radiotherapy is indicated, vascularized free tissue is preferred over non-vascularized free tissue.

=== Anatomic regions ===
==== Head and neck ====
Free flaps are widely used in head & neck reconstruction, particularly after oncologic resection. In the trauma setting, free flap reconstruction remains viable but can present increased technical complexity due to tissue damage, vascular injury, and the need for airway / functional restoration.

When reconstructing complex head and neck defects, the reconstruction often requires bone and soft tissue from a distant donor site to be harvested. Functional reconstruction in the head and neck area often requires reconstruction of the oral cavity, the mandible (lower jaw), the oropharynx, or the pharynx in order to assist with speech and/or swallow. Free flaps may also be used to cover volume defects (eg, after orbital exenteration or maxillectomy) or to cover the great neck vessels prior to radiation (eg, to minimize risk of carotid blowout). Type of defects include:

- Reconstruction of post-traumatic defects: Some areas of the body has missing tissue either from a trauma or from some existing wound. This may include areas on the leg where bone is exposed or any other area on the body that needs soft tissue coverage.
- Reconstruction of a defect following removal of a tumor in the mouth or elsewhere: Soft tissue resection requires soft tissue reconstruction. Composite (soft tissue and hard tissue) resection requires composite reconstruction. Soft tissue flaps include the radial forearm free flap and the anterolateral thigh (ALT) free flap amongst others. Composite free flaps include the fibular free flap, the deep circumflex iliac artery (DCIA) free flap, the scapular free flap and the composite radial free flap amongst others. When the cancer resection involves a part of the lower jaw, depending on the patients age and the patients co-morbidities one composite free flap will be preferred over the others for reconstruction of the defect.
- Reconstruction of esophageal (food-pipe) continuity using segments of intestine

==== Breast ====
- Aesthetic (cosmetic) reconstruction most commonly involves creating a breast after a mastectomy. This may happen at the time of mastectomy or at a later date. Free flaps are usually only done if a TRAM flap is not possible. Plastic surgeons usually perform these surgeries.

==== Upper extremity / compound flaps ====
- Composite free flaps (containing bone and soft tissue) used in the upper limb have been compared with non-bone flaps: a meta-analysis noted higher risk of complications but also improved functional outcomes in selected indications.
- Evolution in flap techniques in upper extremities has also been described, emphasizing versatility of perforator designs in complex defect coverage.

==== Abdominal wall ====
- A 2025 systematic review (32 studies, 104 flaps) found no reports of complete flap loss, partial necrosis ~5.8 %, surgical site infection ~5.8 %, and hernia formation ~4.8 %.
- The latissimus dorsi flap is the most commonly used free flap (36%).

==== Extremity / lower limb ====
- In lower limb reconstructions, reported flap failure and return-to-OR rates vary; a 2024 systematic review challenges and refines prior estimates.
- Moreover, a meta-analysis re-evaluating the classic "Godina principle" showed that early free-flap reconstruction (versus delayed) is significantly associated with lower flap failure and infection rates (p = 0.008 and p = 0.0004, respectively).

=== Functional ===
- Reconstruction of paralyzed face or hand using functioning free muscle flaps.
- Patients with Bell's palsy can have their face re-animated using "free functioning muscle flaps".

== Preoperative considerations ==
Preoperative planning can help determine the viability of a free flap donor site. Vascular imaging and perforator mapping (e.g. CT angiography, Doppler ultrasound, UHF ultrasound) are increasingly used to improve flap planning and reduce intraoperative surprises. Automated methods (e.g. semi-automatic detection of DIEP perforators) show promise in reducing planning time and inter-observer variability.

Prior to harvesting a radial forearm free flap, the modified Allen test is commonly performed to assess the adequacy of collateral circulation to the hand via the ulnar artery. The test helps determine whether the radial artery can be safely sacrificed without risking ischemia to the hand. A positive (normal) result—demonstrated by prompt reperfusion of the hand following release of ulnar artery compression—suggests sufficient ulnar artery perfusion and supports proceeding with flap harvest. In cases of abnormal or equivocal results, further vascular imaging (e.g., Doppler ultrasound or angiography) may be warranted to guide surgical planning.

== Surgical steps during "free autologous tissue transfer" ==
1. A defect is created surgically (either following removal of a tumor or following cleansing of a wound)
2. An incision is made over the area from where the flap will be taken.
3. The flap is dissected and freed from the surrounding tissue.
4. At least one vein and one artery (which constitutes the vascular pedicle) are dissected.
5. The vein and artery (vascular pedicle) are divided, separating the flap from the rest of the body.
6. Before the pedicle is divided, the area the flap will be re-attached to is prepared by identifying a recipient artery and vein.
7. The free flap is brought up to the defect area, and the vein and artery from the flap (vascular pedicle) are anastomosed (re-connected) to the vein and artery identified in the wound. The anastomosis is done using a microscope or a "loupe", hence it is termed "microsurgery"
8. The free flap is sutured to the defect, while it is monitored to ensure the blood vessels remain patent (i.e. the vessels have good blood flow).
9. The donor site area is closed primarily. Sometimes a Split Thickness Skin graft (STSG) may be performed and placed on top of the defect site and/or the donor site.

== Postoperative complications/sequelae ==
=== Flap failure ===
The most common serious complication of a free flap is loss of the venous outflow (e.g. a clot forms in the vein that drains the blood from the flap). Loss of arterial supply is serious too and both will cause necrosis (death) of the flap. Close monitoring of the flap both by nurses and by the surgeon is mandatory following the completion of the operation. If detected early, loss of either the venous or arterial blood supply may be corrected by operative intervention. Many times an implantable Doppler probe or other devices can be installed during surgery to provide better monitoring in the post-operative period. The Doppler probe can be removed before discharge from the hospital.

An institutional review of 5,000 free flaps over 10 years reported a mean take-back rate of 1.53% and flap loss rate of 0.55%. In a lower-volume center over 20 years (136 flaps), the overall success rate was ~92.6 %, improving to ~96 % in later years. The take-back rate was ~16 %, with ~60 % flap salvage on re-exploration.

=== Donor site morbidity ===
Usually the harvest of a "free flap" is performed in such a fashion to cause the least amount of disability. Despite this some disability may occur following removal of this tissue from the "donor site".

=== Other ===
Other complications/sequalae which may occur with any surgery are also possible, including infection and pain.

== Recent advances / future directions ==
Supermicrosurgery — defined as anastomoses of vessels ≤ 0.8 mm — is increasingly used in soft-tissue free flaps. In a systematic review, its flap success rate was ~96.6 %.

Flap thinning techniques and superthin flap designs are evolving to improve contour and reduce bulk, particularly in aesthetic regions (e.g. facial, intraoral) — though balanced carefully against vascular risk.

Techniques to minimize donor-site morbidity, reduce muscle sacrifice, and preserve function are active areas of innovation.

== See also ==
- Flap (surgery)
- Rotation flap
- TRAM flap
- Microsurgery
- List of plastic surgery flaps
- Perforator flaps

== Bibliography ==
- Dolan, Robert (2003). Facial, Plastic, Reconstructive, and Trauma Surgery. Informa Healthcare. ISBN 0-8247-4595-7.
- Ip, David (2008). Orthopedic Traumatology - A Resident's Guide. Springer. ISBN 978-3-540-75860-0.
- Myers, Eugene N.; Michael R. Smith; Jeffrey Myers; Ehab Hanna (2003). Cancer of the Head and Neck. Saunders. ISBN 0-7216-9480-2.
- Baker, Shan R. (2007). Local Flaps in Facial Reconstruction. Mosby. ISBN 978-0-323-03684-9.
- Wolff, K.-D.; Hölzle, R. (2005). Raising of Microvascular Flaps: A Systematic Approach. Springer. ISBN 3-540-21849-1.
