= Reconstructive surgery =

Surgery to restore form and function

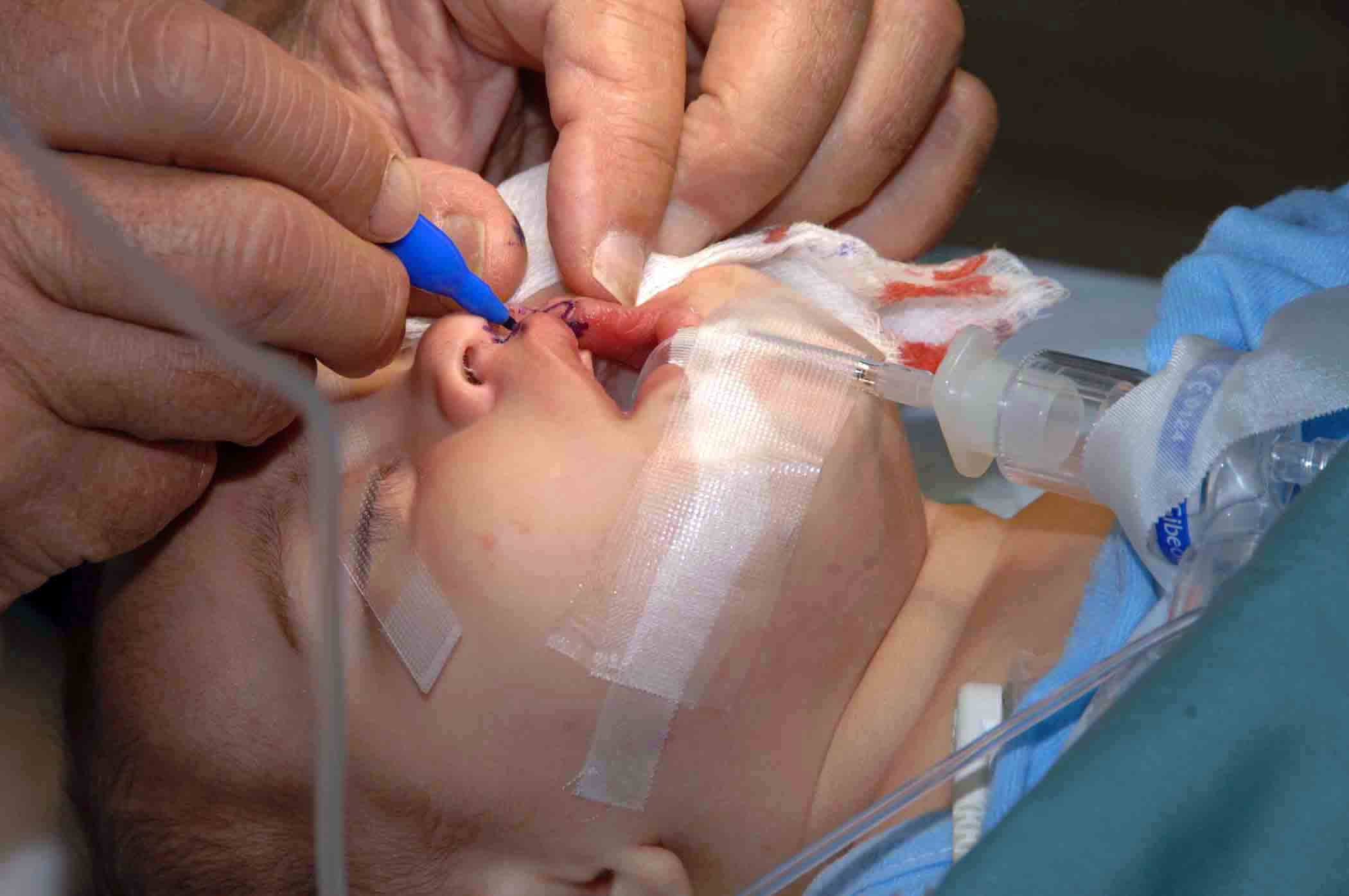
US Navy 090704-A-0566T-023 Operation Smile staff member Dr. Hal Rosenfeild begins reconstructive surgery for a cleft lip on a three-month-old infant aboard the Military Sealift Command hospital ship USNS Comfort (T-AH 20)

Reconstructive surgery is surgery performed to restore normal appearance and function to body parts malformed by a disease, medical condition, or injury. The field of reconstructive surgery includes a wide range of sub-specialties including plastic surgery, craniofacial surgery, oral and maxillofacial surgery, hand surgery, reconstructive microsurgery, and surgical treatment of burns and scars.

== Description ==
Reconstructive surgery is a term with training, clinical, and reimbursement implications. It has historically been referred to as synonymous with plastic surgery. In regard to training, plastic surgery is a recognized medical specialty and a surgeon can be a "board-certified" plastic surgeon by the American Board of Plastic Surgery. However, general reconstructive surgery is not a specialty itself, and there are no board-certified reconstructive surgeons.

More accurately, reconstructive surgery should be contrasted with cosmetic surgery. Reconstructive surgery is performed to

1. Improve/restore to normal function.
2. Restore to a normal appearance of "abnormal" or "malformed" body parts caused by the disease or condition and/or
3. Improve the patient's quality of life.

Separately, the patient must be healthy enough so that the benefits of the procedure outweigh the risks of complications or death. A procedure could be considered reconstructive but not medically necessary due to the risk to the patient.

In addition, Section 1862(a) (1) (A) of the Social Security Act directs the following: "No payment may be made under Part A or Part B for any expenses incurred for items or services not reasonable and necessary for the diagnosis or treatment of illness or injury or to improve the functioning of a malformed body member." Therefore, outside clinical interpretation and carrier guidelines, there is a federal statute that "improving functionality and restoring appearance" are covered as reconstructive and medically necessary.

This definition is contrasted with cosmetic surgery performed to improve aesthetics or the appearance of a body part. A plastic surgeon can perform both reconstructive and cosmetic procedures. Some procedures, such as a panniculectomy (a.k.a. tummy tuck) can be considered as cosmetic by one insurance company and reconstructive by another. The surgeon may not be using the Medicare or reimbursement criteria when referring to a procedure as reconstructive or cosmetic. Plastic surgeons, maxillo-facial surgeons and otolaryngologists do reconstructive surgery on faces to correct congenital defects, after trauma and to reconstruct the head and neck after cancer.

Another good example is repair of a cleft palate, or cheiloplasty, which surgically corrects abnormal development, restores function to the lips and mouth and produces a more normal appearance. This meets the definition of reconstructive surgery and is mandated by state laws in at least 31 states, but could be denied as cosmetic by individual insurance companies in the remaining states.

Other branches of surgery (e.g., general surgery, gynecological surgery, pediatric surgery, plastic surgery, podiatric surgery) also perform some reconstructive procedures.

Reconstructive surgery represents a small but critical component of the comprehensive care of cancer patients. Its primary role in the treatment of cancer patients is to extend the ability of other surgeons and specialists to more radically treat cancer, offering patients the best opportunity for cure.

Reconstructive surgeons use the concept of a reconstructive ladder to manage increasingly complex wounds. This ranges from very simple techniques such as primary closure and dressings to more complex skin grafts, tissue expansion, and free flaps.

Reconstructive surgery procedures include breast implant removal, reduction mammoplasty, breast reconstruction, surgical correction of birth anomalies, congenital nevi surgery, and liposuction for lipedema. Cosmetic surgery procedures include breast enhancement, reduction and lift, face lift, forehead lift, upper and lower eyelid surgery (blepharoplasty), laser skin resurfacing (laser resurfacing), chemical peel, nose reshaping (rhinoplasty), reconstruction liposuction, Nasal reconstruction using a paramedian forehead flap, as well as tummy tuck (abdominoplasty).

=== Facial plastic and reconstructive surgery ===
Facial plastic and reconstructive surgery (FPRS) is a surgical subspecialty focused on improving both the functional and aesthetic aspects of the face, head, and neck.

== Use of implants and biomaterials ==
Recent literature in medline also has noted implementation of barbed suture in these procedures.

Biomaterials are, in their simplest form, plastic implants used to correct or replace damaged body parts. Biomaterials were not used for reconstructive purposes until after World War II due to the new and improved technology and the tremendous need for the correction of damaged body parts that could replace transplantation. The process involves scientific and medical research to ensure that the biomaterials are biocompatible and that they can assume the mechanical and functioning roles of the components they are replacing.

A successful implantation can best be achieved by a team that understands not only the anatomical, physiological, biochemical, and pathological aspects of the problem, but also comprehends bioengineering. Cellular and tissue engineering is crucial to know for reconstructive procedures.

An overview of the standardization and control of biomedical devices has recently been gathered by D. G. Singleton. Papers have covered in depth the U.S. Food and Drug Administration (FDA) Premarket Approval Process (J. L. Ely) and FDA regulations governing Class III devices. Two papers have described how the National Institute of Standards and Technology, American Dental Association, National Institute of Dental and Craniofacial Research, and private dental companies have collaborated in a number of important advances in dental materials, devices, and analytical systems.
