= Tibia shaft fracture =

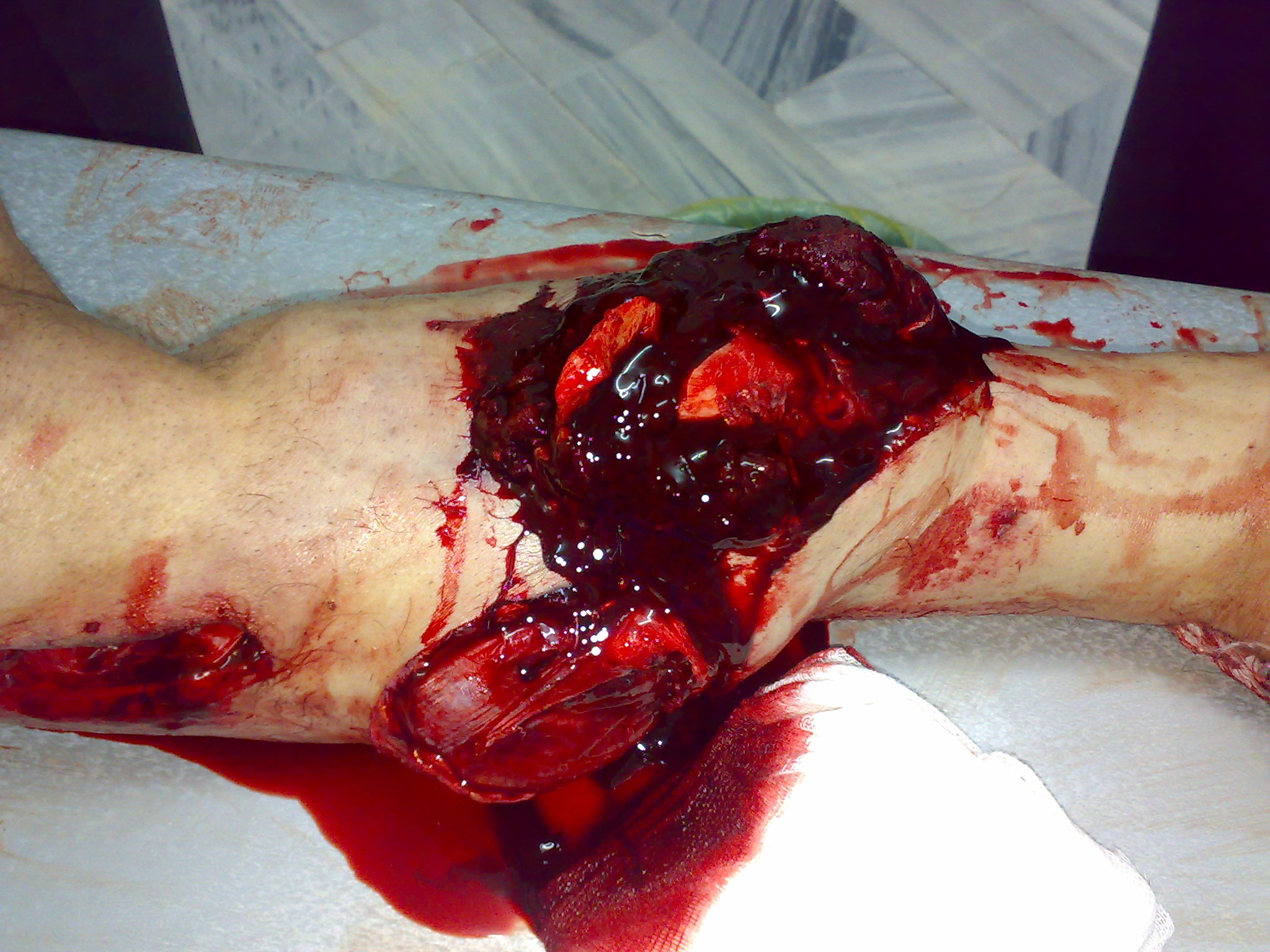
- Open fracture of the shaft of the tibia.
- Specialty: Orthopedic surgery

Tibia shaft fracture is a fracture of the proximal (upper) third of the tibia (lower leg bone). Due to the location of the tibia on the shin, it is the most commonly fractured long bone in the body.

== Epidemiology ==
Tibial shaft fractures are some of the most common long bone fractures in humans. They account for approximately 17% of lower extremity fractures. They also account for approximately 4% of fractures among Medicare patients. Tibial shaft fractures occur more often in males than females. The age distribution of these fractures is bimodal, with peaks in younger (20's) and older adults (50's-60's). Younger patients often sustain tibial shaft fractures from high energy trauma mechanisms such as motor vehicle accidents and sports injuries. In older adults, low-energy mechanisms like falls are most common. Tibial shaft fractures can be anatomically categorized by diaphysial location. Fractures of the midshaft are most frequent. Proximal and distal third fractures are less common.

== Mechanism of injury ==
Low energy tibial shaft fractures usually result from indirect torsional forces such as falls from standing heights, twisting injuries, or rotational forces applied to the leg. These mechanisms create rotational stress along the diaphysis. This typically results in a spiral fracture pattern. Spiral tibial fractures from these mechanisms are often associated with a fibular fracture at a different level. They also involve less severe soft tissue injury compared with high-energy mechanisms.

High energy fractures result from direct trauma such as motor vehicle accidents, falls from significant heights, or severe sports injuries. These mechanisms usually produce wedge or short oblique fractures with comminution. They are often associated with a fibular fracture at the same level. High energy fractures have a higher likelihood of severe soft tissue injuries, having associated compartment syndrome, and of being open fractures.

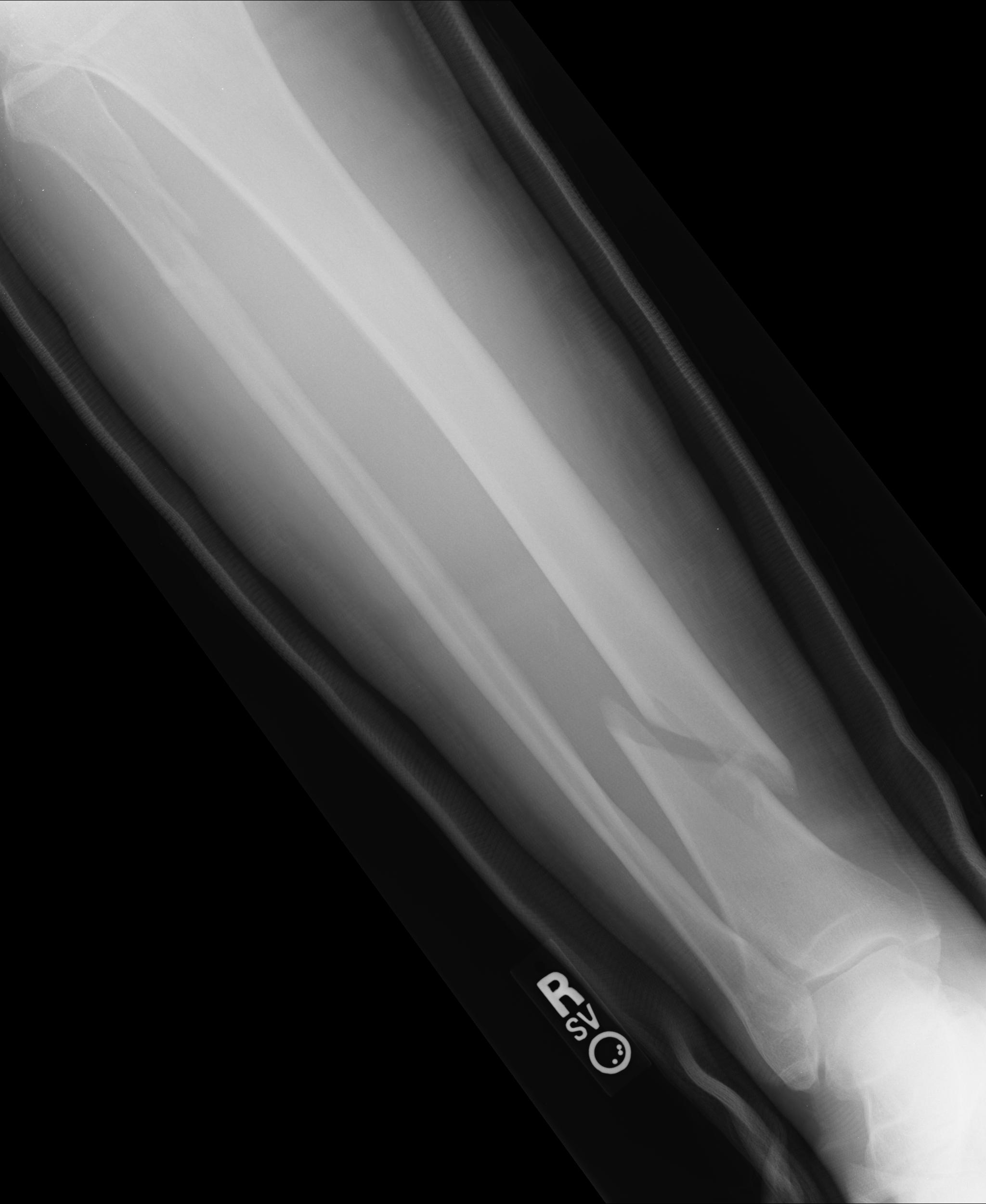

== Anatomic location ==
Proximal third fractures necessitate thorough assessment of the knee to exclude extension into the tibial plateau. Articular involvement may be difficult to detect on x-ray and in such instances may require a CT scan. Due to deforming muscular forces, proximal third fractures are prone to valgus and procurvatum malalignment during intramedullary nailing. In particular, the procurvatum results from the gastrocnemius pulling the distal fragment in to flexion while the patellar tendon pulls the proximal fragment in to extension. Valgus malalignment results from the per anserinus pulling the proximal fracture fragment in to varus.

Spiral distal third tibial shaft are more commonly associated with posterior malleolar fractures. Extension to the posterior malleolus can affect syndesmotic stability. Careful evaluation of the ankle is thus required when such fracture patterns are present. CT scan may be warranted if X-ray findings are equivocal.

Around 5% of all tibial fractures are bifocal, meaning there are 2 separate fractures of the tibia.

== Clinical evaluation ==
Clinical evaluation of tibial shaft fractures should begin with a thorough neurovascular assessment. This is essential in all cases and especially important in open injuries. Distal perfusion should be assessed by palpating the dorsalis pedis and posterior tibial pulses. Neurologic examination should include careful assessment of the common peroneal and tibial nerves. The soft tissue envelope should be evaluated. Fracture blisters may delay or contraindicate early operative reduction, particularly for periarticular fractures.

Patients should be closely monitored for compartment syndrome with these fractures. Pain out of proportion to the injury serves as the most reliable clinical indicator. But compartment pressure measurements may assist in diagnosis. A differential between diastolic blood pressure and compartment pressure less than 30 mm Hg is indicative of compartment syndrome. Deep posterior compartment pressures can be elevated even when superficial compartments appear soft. There is an 8.1% risk of compartment syndrome in diaphyseal fractures, compared to proximal (1.6%) and distal (1.4%) fractures.

== Classification ==
Gustilo and Anderson Classification of open fractures

Type	Description
Type I	Clean skin opening of <1 cm, usually a “poke hole” from inside to outside; minimal muscle contusion; simple spiral or short oblique fractures
Type II	Laceration >1 cm long, with extensive soft tissue damage; minimal-to-moderate crushing component; simple transverse or short oblique fractures with minimal comminution
Type III	Extensive soft tissue damage greater than 10 cm in length, including muscles, skin, and neurovascular structures; often a high-energy injury with a severe crushing component
IIIA	Extensive soft tissue laceration, adequate soft tissue coverage; segmental fractures, gunshot injuries, minimal periosteal stripping
IIIB	Extensive soft tissue injury with periosteal stripping and bone exposure requiring soft tissue flap closure; usually associated with massive contamination
IIIC	Vascular injury requiring repair

=== Tscherne classfication of closed fractures ===
- classifies soft tissue injury in closed fractures

Grade	Description
Grade 0	Injury from indirect forces with negligible soft tissue damage
Grade I	Closed fracture caused by low-moderate energy mechanisms, with superficial abrasions or contusions of soft tissues overlying the fracture
Grade II	Closed fracture with significant muscle contusion, with possible deep, contaminated skin abrasions associated with moderate to severe energy mechanisms and skeletal injury; high risk for compartment syndrome
Grade III	Extensive crushing of soft tissues, with subcutaneous degloving or avulsion, with arterial disruption or established compartment syndrome

== Treatment ==
=== Nonoperative treatment ===
This may be appropriate for isolated, closed, low-energy injuries with minimal displacement and comminution, or for patients not able to undergo surgery. Treatment typically consists of fracture reduction followed by application of a long leg cast with progressive weight bearing. When casting, the knee should be positioned in approximately 0 to 15 degrees of flexion to facilitate early mobilization. Patients may begin weight bearing with crutches as tolerated. Progressing to full weight bearing should be considered by the second to fourth week. After three to six weeks, the long leg cast can often be transitioned to a patella-bearing cast or functional fracture brace. Union rates with nonoperative treatment are high, reaching up to 97%. But delayed weight bearing may occur in cases of delayed union or nonunion. Hindfoot stiffness is a notable limitation.

Acceptable alignment following reduction includes less than 5 degrees of varus or valgus angulation, less than 10 degrees of anterior or posterior angulation (with under 5 degrees preferred), and less than 10 degrees of rotational deformity, with external rotation generally better tolerated than internal rotation. Shortening should be limited to less than 1 cm, as even 5 mm of distraction can significantly delay healing. At least 50% cortical contact is recommended. These are essentially the non-operative tolerances. Surgery is recommended for any fracture reduction that exceeds these parameters. Clinically, overall alignment can be assessed by ensuring collinearity of the anterior superior iliac spine, the center of the patella, and the base of the second proximal phalanx.

Time to fracture union is approximately 16 ± 4 weeks but varies widely depending on fracture pattern and the degree of soft-tissue injury. Delayed union is typically defined as healing beyond 20 weeks. Nonunion is characterized by loss of healing potential, evidenced by persistent fracture gaps, sclerotic fracture ends, and lack of radiographic progression on serial imaging rather than time alone.

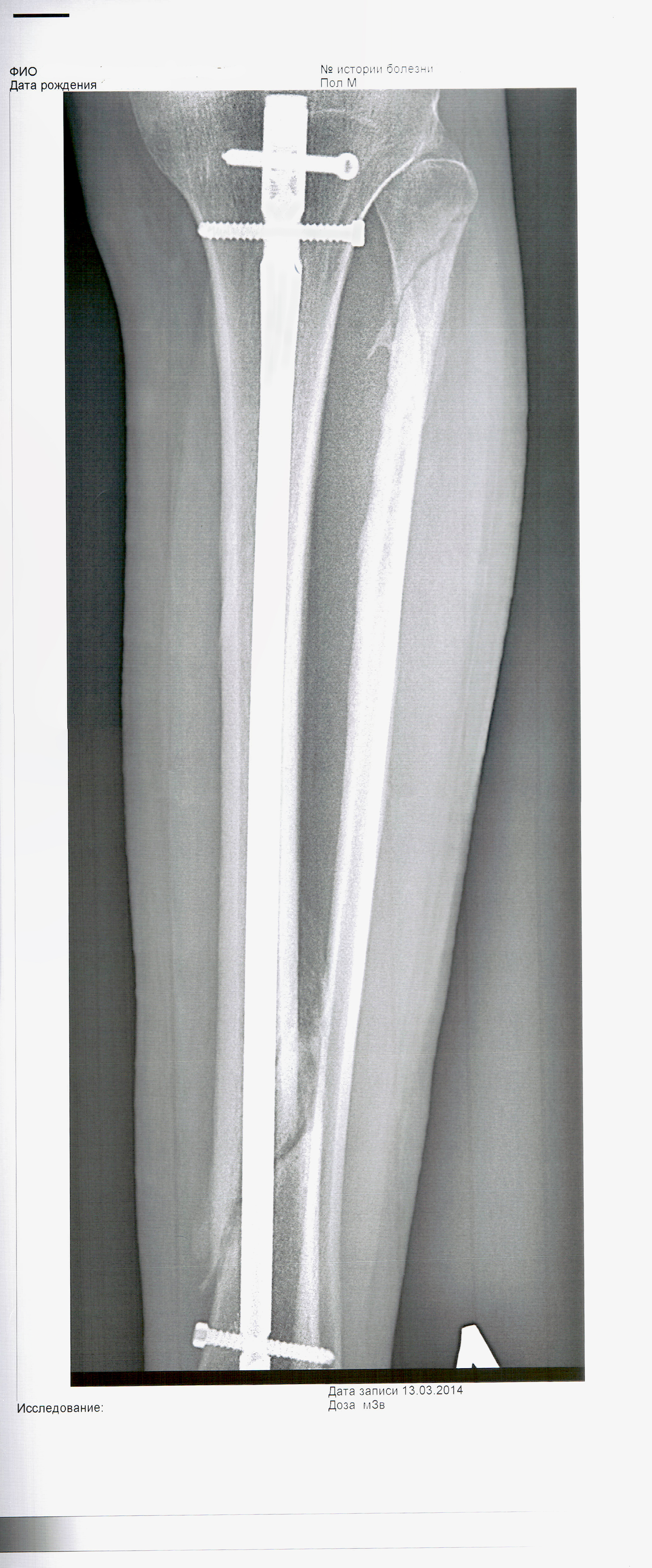
X-ray of an intramedullary nail.

=== Operative treatment ===
Operative management of tibial shaft fractures most commonly involves intramedullary nailing. This offers several biological and biomechanical advantages. This technique preserves the periosteal blood supply, minimizes additional soft-tissue disruption, and provides reliable control of fracture alignment, translation, and rotation. This makes it suitable for the majority of fracture patterns.

Intramedullary nails may be locked or unlocked. Locked nails provide rotational stability and effectively prevent shortening in comminuted fractures or those with bone loss. Interlocking screws may be removed later to dynamize the fracture site if healing is delayed. In contrast, nonlocked nails allow axial impaction with weight bearing but offer poor rotational control and are therefore used infrequently.

Nails may also be reamed or unreamed. Reamed intramedullary nailing is indicated for most closed and many open fractures. It allows placement of a larger, stronger nail with improved resistance to bending forces. It also affords enhanced intramedullary stability and increases periosteal blood flow. Unreamed nailing has traditionally been favored in some open fractures to preserve remaining endosteal blood supply and reduce operative time. But more recent evidence suggests it is also acceptable in closed fractures. Hardware failure is more closely related to implant size than reaming technique.

Nail insertion can be performed through either an infrapatellar or suprapatellar approach. Suprapatellar nailing performed in a semiextended position has been associated with reduced postoperative knee pain, improved sagittal alignment, decreased fluoroscopy time, and may facilitate reduction of proximal tibial fractures.

== Complications ==
=== Malunion ===
Malunion refers to fracture healing outside acceptable alignment parameters. It is most commonly seen with nonoperative treatment and in metaphyseal fractures where maintaining reduction is more difficult.

=== Nonunion ===
Nonunion is associated with high-energy trauma, open fractures (especially Gustilo grade III), infection, inadequate fixation, and significant initial displacement. An intact fibula may also contribute by limiting fracture compression.

=== Infection ===
Infection occurs most frequently after open tibial fractures. Risk increases with higher-grade soft-tissue injury, contamination, and delayed wound management.

=== Soft-tissue loss ===
Soft-tissue compromise is common in severe tibial fractures. Delaying wound coverage beyond 7 to 10 days increases infection risk. Some patients require rotational or free flap coverage to achieve closure.

=== Knee and ankle stiffness ===
Stiffness of the knee or ankle may develop particularly with prolonged immobilization. This complication is more commonly seen with nonoperative management.

=== Knee pain ===
Anterior knee pain is the most common complication following intramedullary tibial nailing. Symptoms may persist long term and affect functional outcomes.

=== Hardware breakage ===
Implant failure depends on nail size and material. Larger reamed nails with larger locking screws fail less often, while unreamed nails with smaller screws have higher breakage rates.

=== Thermal necrosis of the tibial diaphysis ===
Thermal injury to bone has been described as a theoretical risk of intramedullary reaming. Recent basic science studies have not supported tourniquet use as a cause.

=== Complex regional pain syndrome ===
Complex regional pain syndrome may occur after prolonged cast immobilization. It presents with pain and swelling followed by limb atrophy. There may also be radiographic demineralization and ankle deformity. Treatment includes compression, early weight bearing, physical therapy, and adjunctive interventions when needed.

=== Fat embolism ===
Fat embolism results from marrow fat entering the circulation. Clinical findings include respiratory distress, neurologic changes, anemia, fever, and petechial rash. Severe cases may lead to systemic inflammation and organ dysfunction.

== Signs and symptoms ==
Patients with tibial shaft fractures present with pain and localized swelling. Due to the pain they are unable to bear weight. There may be deformity, angulation, or malrotation of the leg. Fractures that are open (bone exposed or breaking the skin) are common.

== Mechanism ==
Since approximately one third of the tibia lies directly beneath the skin, open fractures are common compared to other long bones. These open fractures are most commonly caused by high velocity trauma (e.g. motor vehicle collisions), while closed fractures most commonly occur from sports injuries or falls. Osteoporosis can be a contributing factor. Skiing and football (soccer) injuries are also common culprits.

== Diagnosis ==
=== Examination ===
Prior to realignment and splinting an assessment is performed to ensure there are no open wounds, soft-tissue contusions, or neurovascular injuries.

=== Radiography ===
Anteroposterior (AP) and lateral radiographs the include the entire length of the lower leg (knee to ankle) are highly sensitive and specific for tibial shaft fractures.

=== Classification ===
Two systems of fracture classification are commonly used to aid diagnosis and management of tibia shaft fractures:

- Oestern and Tscherne Classification
- Gustilo-Anderson Classification

Management is dependent on the determination of whether the fracture is open or closed.

== Management ==
=== Nonoperative treatment ===
Nonsurgical treatment of tibia shaft fractures is now limited to closed, stable, isolated, minimally displaced fractures caused by a low-energy mechanism of injury. This treatment consists of application of a long-leg cast.

=== Operative treatment ===
Surgical treatment is typically indicated for high-energy trauma fractures. Intramedullary nailing is a common technique, but external fixation may have equivalent outcomes and be preferred under certain patient conditions that may preclude intramedullary nailing, such as the presence of a total knee arthroplasty.

== Epidemiology ==
Tibia shaft fractures are the most common long bone fractures. They account for accounting for 1.9% of all fractures in adults and approximately 4% of the fractures seen in the Medicare population. Tibia shaft fractures are particularly common injuries in certain sports, such as in MMA, where a successful check against an incoming low kick (a defensive technique in which the receiver's shin is used to block the low kick) can result in the practitioner of the kick fracturing their own shin.
