= Mollie Lentaigne =

British artist and Red Cross nurse (1920–2024)

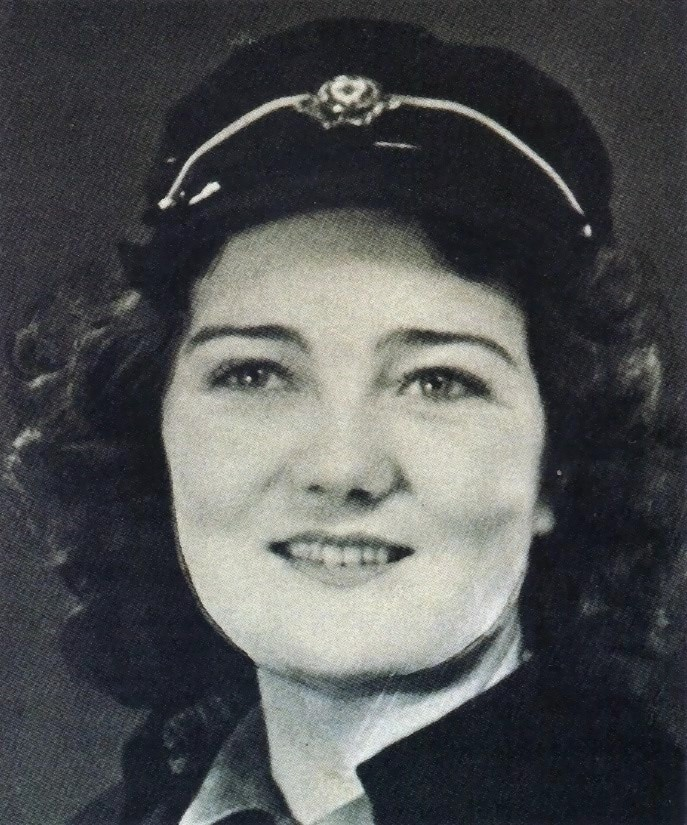
- Lentaigne, c. 1940
- Born: Mary Evelyn Lentaigne; 6 May 1920; Simla, British India
- Died: 29 April 2024 (aged 103); Harare, Zimbabwe
- Occupations: Medical artist, Red Cross Voluntary Aid Detachment nurse
- Years active: World War II
- Known for: Illustrations of surgical procedures performed on injured servicemen
- Spouse: Timothy Lock (m. 1955)
- Children: 6
- Parents: Edward Charles Lentaigne (father); Cecilia Mary Lentaigne (mother)

Mary Evelyn Lentaigne (6 May 1920 – 29 April 2024) was a British medical artist and Red Cross Voluntary Aid Detachment nurse who worked at the Queen Victoria Hospital, England, during the Second World War. She is known for the drawings she made there of the surgical procedures of New Zealand plastic surgeon Archibald McIndoe who was working on injured servicemen. Around 300 of her drawings are held by the East Grinstead Museum where they form the Mollie Lentaigne Collection.

== Early life and family ==
Lentaigne was born on 6 May 1920, the elder daughter of Lt. Col. Edward Charles Lentaigne DSO and Cecilia Mary Lentaigne (née Bunbury) in Simla, British India. Her brother, second lieutenant John Wilfred O'Neill Lentaigne MC of the Rifle Brigade, died in 1942 at El Alamein. In 1955, she married Timothy Ingram Lock in Harare, then Salisbury, Rhodesia. They had four sons and two daughters.

Lentaigne came from a family with several distinguished medical ancestors. These include her grandfather, Sir John Vincent Lentaigne (1855–1915), who was an Irish surgeon and president of the Royal College of Surgeons in Ireland between 1908 and 1910. Sir John was himself the grandson of the surgeon Benjamin Lentaigne who was born in France in 1773, but, as a Royalist and firm supporter of King Louis XVI, was forced to escape to England at the age of nineteen. He went on to earn a medical qualification in England and join the British Army. He was posted to the Dublin barracks in 1775, and was involved in the treatment of Wolfe Tone, the leader of the 1798 Irish Rebellion, during his imprisonment and the final days of his life.

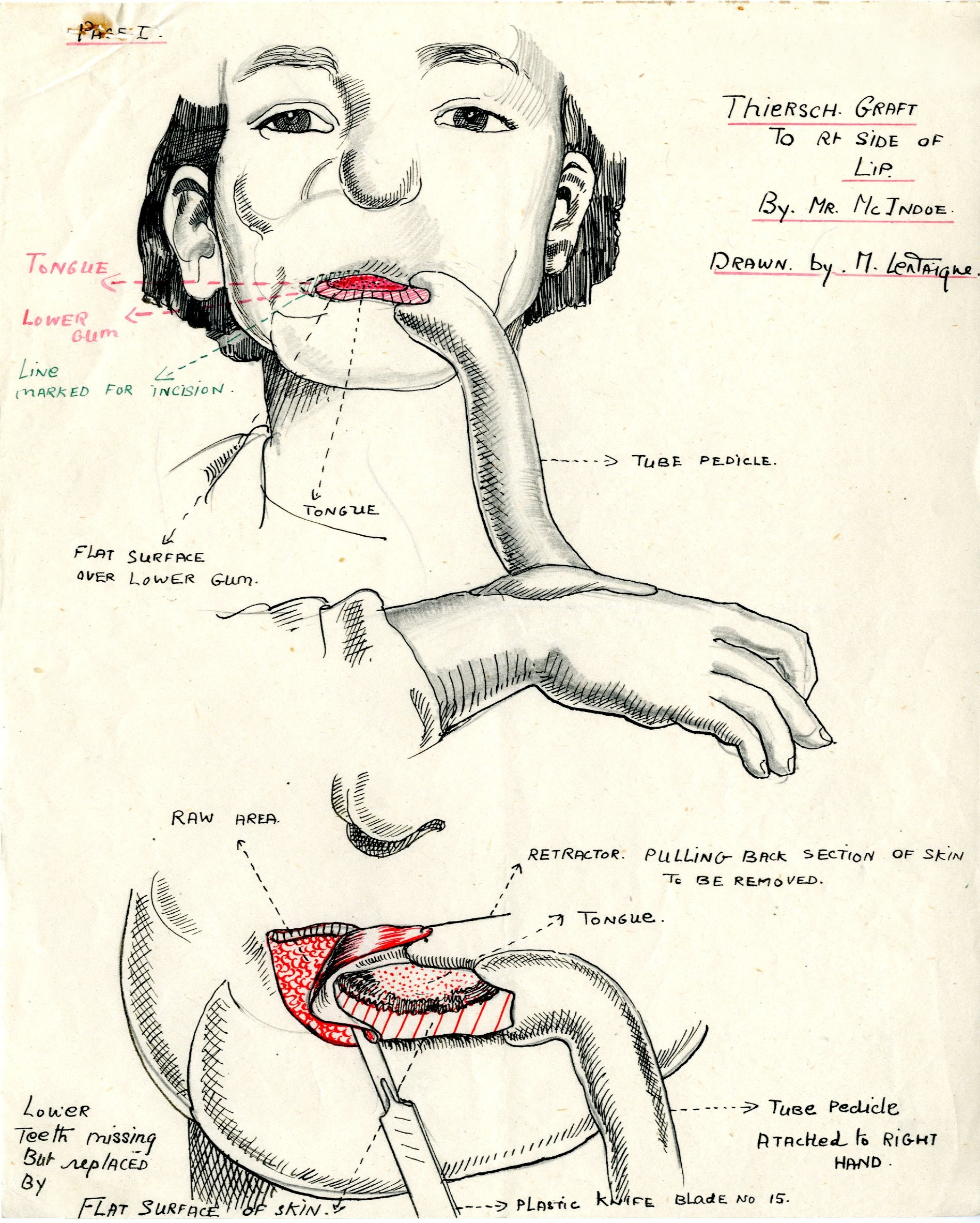
Lentaigne's drawing of a Thiersch graft to the right side of a lip

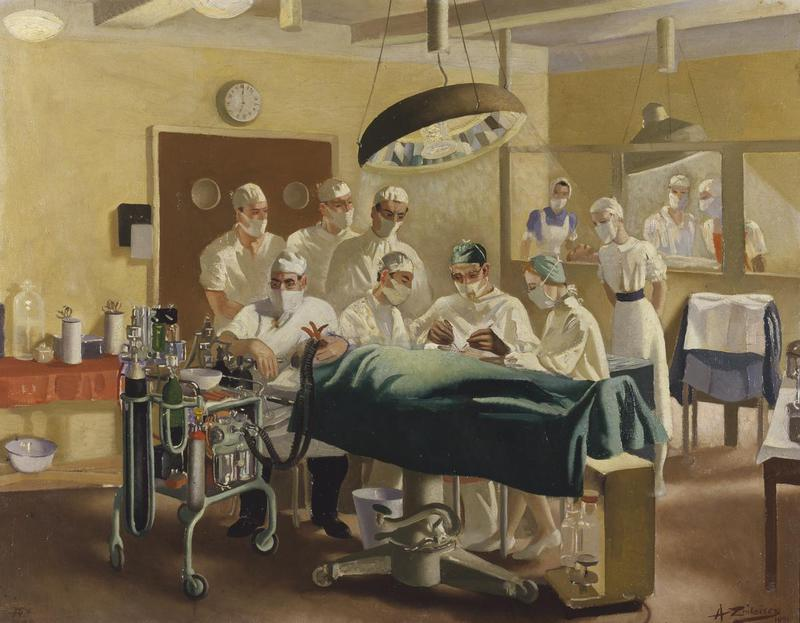
Archibald McIndoe operating at East Grinstead: painting by Anna Katrina Zinkeisen, 1944

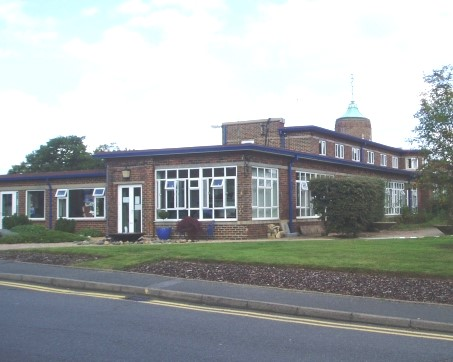
Queen Victoria Hospital in 2005

== Second World War ==
During the Second World War, Lentaigne worked as a Red Cross Voluntary Aid Detachment nurse at the Queen Victoria Hospital, East Grinstead, West Sussex, where her duties included drawing the experimental operations of Archibald McIndoe and his fellow surgeons. She needed to work quickly in the operating theatre and so used pencil but subsequently added ink and colour to some of her work.

Her drawings have uncovered material on the Guinea Pig Club, a club formed of Archibald McIndoe's surgical patients, many of whom were severely burned Royal Air Force pilots and aircrew.

== Death and legacy ==
Lentaigne died in Harare, Zimbabwe, on 29 April 2024, one week shy of her 104th birthday.

Around 300 of Lentaigne's drawings have been preserved at the East Grinstead Museum, as the Mollie Lentaigne Collection. After the surviving Guinea Pig Club members used social media to search for Lentaigne and found her living in Zimbabwe, she returned to East Grinstead in 2013 to be reunited with her work.

In 2015, the Queen Victoria Hospital NHS Foundation Trust and the West Sussex Record Office were awarded a £72,952 Wellcome Trust grant for the digitisation of over 600 Guinea Pig patient files and the accompanying drawings by Mollie Lentaigne. In 2018, Alexander Baldwin of the University of Birmingham won the Norah Schuster Prize of the Royal Society of Medicine's History of Medicine Society for an essay on the medical drawings of Mollie Lentaigne.
