= Cyril Wyche =

English lawyer and politician

The Right Honourable Sir Cyril Wyche FRS
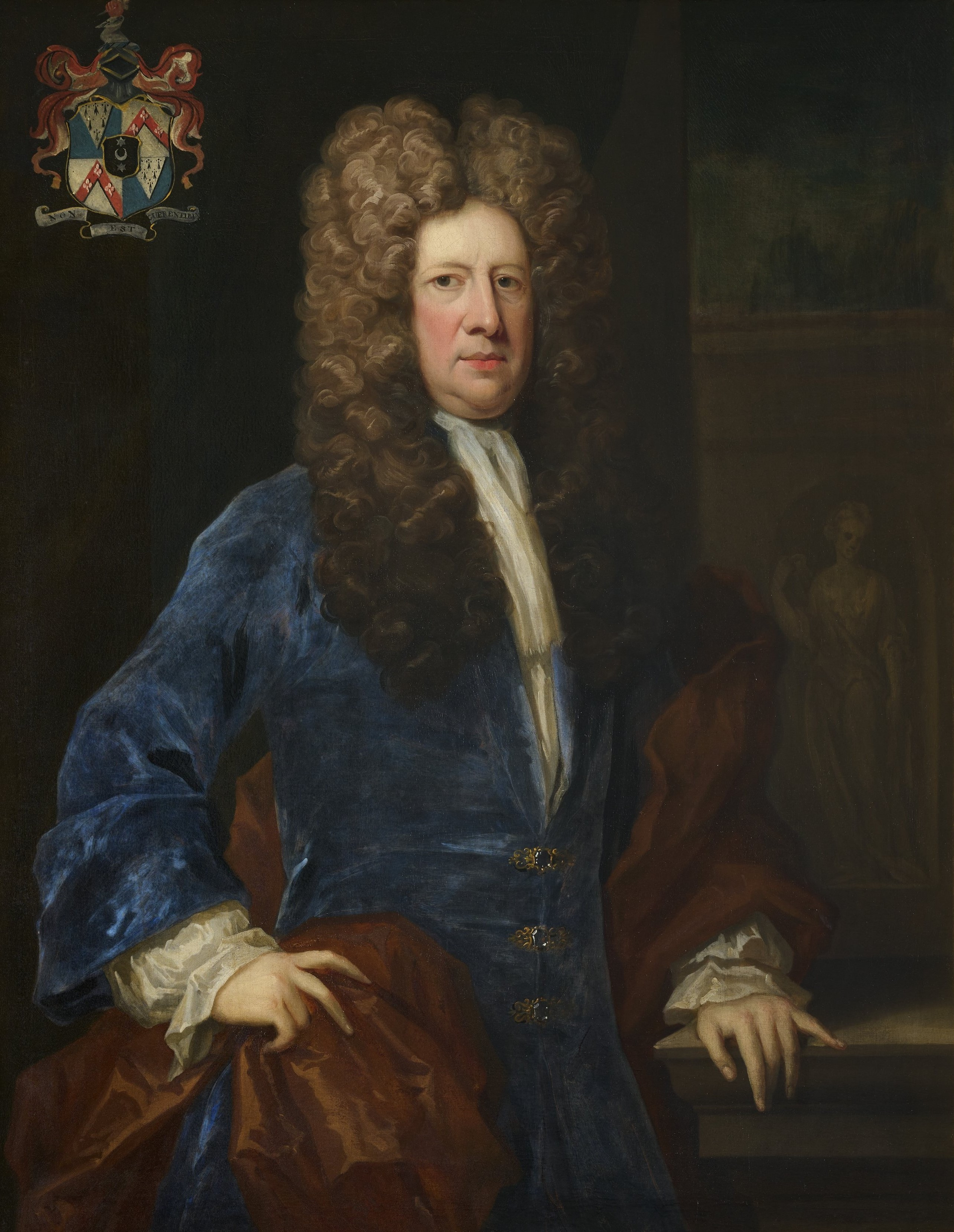
- Portrait of Wyche c. 1700

Chief Secretary for Ireland
- In office 1692–1693
- Preceded by: John Davis
- Succeeded by: Richard Aldworth
- In office 1676–1682
- Preceded by: William Harbord
- Succeeded by: Sir William Ellis

5th President of the Royal Society
- In office 1683 – 30 November 1684
- Preceded by: John Hoskyns
- Succeeded by: Samuel Pepys

Member of the English Parliament
- 1702 – 1705: Preston
- 1685 – 1689: Saltash
- 1681 – 1685: East Grinstead
- 1661 – 1678: Callington

Member of the Irish Parliament for Dublin University
- In office 1692–1693
- Preceded by: Sir John Meade, 1st Baronet; Joseph Coghlan
- Succeeded by: Richard Aldworth; William Molyneux

Personal details
- Born: 1632 Constantinople, Turkey
- Died: 28 December 1707 (aged 74–75) Hockwold cum Wilton, Norfolk
- Resting place: St Peter's Church, Hockwold
- Spouses: Elizabeth Jermyn (m. 1663) Susanna Norreys (m. 1684) Mary Evelyn (m. 1692)
- Parents: Sir Peter Wyche (father); Jane Meredith (mother)
- Education: University of Oxford (BA, MA, DCL)

Sir Cyril Wyche FRS (c. 1632 – 28 December 1707) was an English lawyer and politician. He served two terms in the Dublin Castle administration as Chief Secretary for Ireland and was a Lord Justice of Ireland from 1693 to 1695. He was the fifth President of the Royal Society, and represented several constituencies in both the House of Commons of England and the Irish House of Commons.

== Early life ==
He was born in Constantinople, then part of the Ottoman Empire, where his father, Sir Peter Wyche, was the English Ambassador. He was baptised by and named after Patriarch Cyril Lucaris, who became his godfather. Wyche was educated at Westminster School and Christ Church, Oxford, receiving a Bachelor of Arts in 1653. He received his Master of Arts (MA) in 1655 and his Doctor of Civil Law (DCL) in 1665.

He entered Gray's Inn in 1657 and was eventually called to the bar in 1670. In 1660, around the time of the Stuart Restoration, he was knighted by Charles II in The Hague, likely owing to the influence of his brother-in-law, the Earl of Bath. Shortly afterwards Wyche inherited a substantial fortune on the death of his mother, Jane Meredith, daughter of Sir William Meredith of Stansty.

== Career ==
=== 1661 to 1685 ===
Wyche was first returned to parliament as the Member of Parliament for Callington in 1661, having been elected on the interest of John Coryton. Between 1662 and 1675 he was one of the six clerks in Chancery, and by 1664 was listed as a firm supporter of the court faction. After resigning from the Chancery, he sold his inherited properties in Sussex and constructed a new, grand townhouse on Lord St Albans' development on St James's Square.

In August 1676, Wyche was appointed secretary to the lord lieutenant of Ireland, the Earl of Essex, on the recommendation of the Earl of Bath. He remained in post under the new lord lieutenant, the Duke of Ormonde, the following year. His administrative abilities were highly valued by both lords lieutenant and Essex described Wyche as "a very discreet understanding man". Upon becoming secretary he was appointed to the Privy Council of Ireland. He continued to contribute to parliamentary sessions in England during this period and was commissioned to examine Edward Colman in Newgate Prison during the Popish Plot in 1678. Wyche declined to stand for re-election 1679, but two years later he was elected to represent East Grinstead on the interest of the Earl of Dorset. He attended the Oxford Parliament, during which he was likely an opponent of the Exclusion Bill.

One of the original members of the Royal Society from 1663, between 1683 and 1684 he served as the society's fifth President. In 1684 he was elected a fellow of the Dublin Philosophical Society. Throughout this period he remained Ormonde's secretary for Irish affairs, but without a salary. Wyche complained to Ormonde that "I am the only man I think almost that ever was in my station without any salary from the crown", but the duke refused him a pension.

=== 1685 to 1705 ===
Wyche lost his secretarial office with Ormonde's retirement on the accession of James II in 1685. That year he was elected as the MP for Saltash. Despite his shock at the new king's ostentatious attendance at Roman Catholic mass, he continued to be a court supporter in parliamentary proceedings. Nonetheless, in 1688 he welcomed the Glorious Revolution and in 1690 he was appointed a gentleman of the Privy Chamber by William III.

In 1692 he again became involved in Irish affairs with his appointment as secretary to Viscount Sydney. Wyche was elected to the Irish House of Commons as the MP for Dublin University in 1692 Irish parliament. In 1693 he played a leading role in the revival of the Dublin Society, serving as the society's president in that year. That year he was appointed one of three Lords Justices of Ireland following the removal of Sydney as lord lieutenant. Wyche, however, disagreed with his fellow Lord Justice, Lord Capell of Tewkesbury, over the correct policy for Ireland in relation to money bills. Capell, who had the backing of the Whig Junto in England, ensured that Wyche was removed from office in May 1695.

Returning to England, Wyche was rumoured to be under consideration for appointment as ambassador to Constantinople, but the appointment never materialised. He remained out of crown employment until June 1700, when he was made chairman of the trustees for the Irish forfeitures, and returned to Ireland until 1703. In 1702 he was elected to represent Preston, but was not re-elected in 1705.

== Personal life ==
He married three times; firstly in 1663, Elizabeth, the youngest daughter of Sir Thomas Jermyn of Rushbrooke, Suffolk, with whom he had two sons (one of whom predeceased him) and two daughters; secondly in 1684 Susanna, the daughter of Sir Edward Norreys of Weston on the Green, Oxfordshire and the widow of Sir Herbert Perrott of Wellington; and thirdly in 1692 Mary, the daughter of George Evelyn of Wotton, Surrey. Mary was the niece of John Evelyn, the diarist.

Around 1690 he purchased Hockwold Hall (then called The Poynings) at Hockwold cum Wilton, Norfolk. He died there on 28 December 1707 and a monument to him can be found in St Peter's Church, Hockwold. He was succeeded by his eldest son, Jermyn Wyche, whose inheritance was valued at over £100,000.

Parliament of England
Preceded by Sir Hugh Pollard; Sir John Coryton	Member of Parliament for Callington; 1661–1678; With: Allen Brodrick 1661; Sir Henry Bennet 1661–1665; Samuel Rolle 1665–1678	Succeeded by Samuel Rolle; Sir John Coryton
Preceded by Goodwin Wharton; William Jephson	Member of Parliament for East Grinstead; 1681–1685; With: Henry Powle	Succeeded by Simon Smith; Thomas Jones
Preceded by Sir John Davie; Bernard Granville	Member of Parliament for Saltash; 1685–1689; With: Edmund Waller	Succeeded by John Waddon; Bernard Granville
Preceded by Henry Ashhurst; Thomas Molyneux	Member of Parliament for Preston; 1702–1705; With: Charles Zedenno Stanley	Succeeded by Francis Annesley; Edward Rigby
Parliament of Ireland
Preceded by Sir John Meade, Bt; Joseph Coghlan	Member of Parliament for Dublin University; 1692–1693; Served alongside: William Molyneux	Succeeded by Richard Aldworth; William Molyneux
Political offices
Preceded by William Harbord	Chief Secretary for Ireland; 1676–1682	Succeeded by Sir William Ellis
Preceded by John Davis	Chief Secretary for Ireland; 1692–1693	Succeeded by Sir Richard Aldworth
Professional and academic associations
Preceded by John Hoskyns	5th President of the Royal Society; 1683–1684	Succeeded by Samuel Pepys
