= John Waddon =

John Waddon may refer to:

- John Waddon (Parliamentarian) (1591–?), MP for Plymouth during the English Civil War
- John Waddon (died 1695) (1649–1695), his grandson, English MP for Saltash, Vice-Warden of the Stannaries and Governor of Pendennis Castle
