= Jermyn Wyche =

British Tory politician

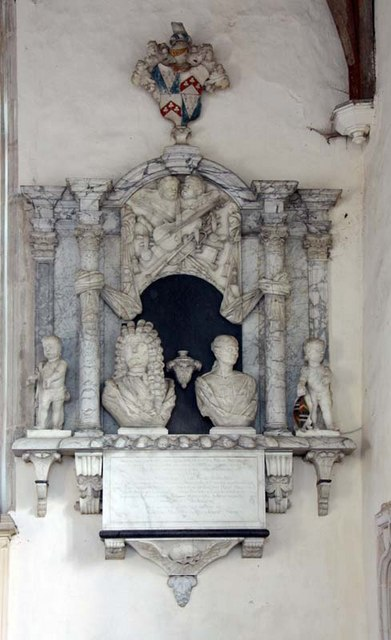
The memorial to Jermyn Wyche and his wife, Mary, in St Peter's Church, Hockwold

Jermyn Wyche (c.1670 – 7 January 1720) was a British Tory politician.

Wyche was the eldest surviving son of Sir Cyril Wyche by his first wife, Elizabeth, the youngest daughter of Sir Thomas Jermyn. He was educated at Harrow School before entering Gonville and Caius College, Cambridge on 1 May 1688. In 1698, his father obtained for him the position of Lieutenant-General of the Ordnance in Ireland. He succeeded his father in 1707 to an estate reputedly worth £100,000, but he was subsequently involved in a protracted legal dispute with Sir John Pakington, 4th Baronet over property Wyche had inherited from his step-mother.

In 1713, Wyche was returned as the Member of Parliament for the rotten borough of Fowey on the interest of his distant relation, Lord Lansdowne. He was an inactive member, but was recorded in a list by Worsley as a Tory. He did not stand for re-election in 1715.

On 27 August 1699 he married Mary, the daughter and heriess of John Hungerford, by whom he had one son and two daughters.

Parliament of Great Britain
Preceded by Bernard Granville; Henry Vincent	Member of Parliament for Fowey; 1713–1715; With: Henry Vincent	Succeeded by Jonathan Elford; Henry Vincent
