= Dublin Philosophical Society =

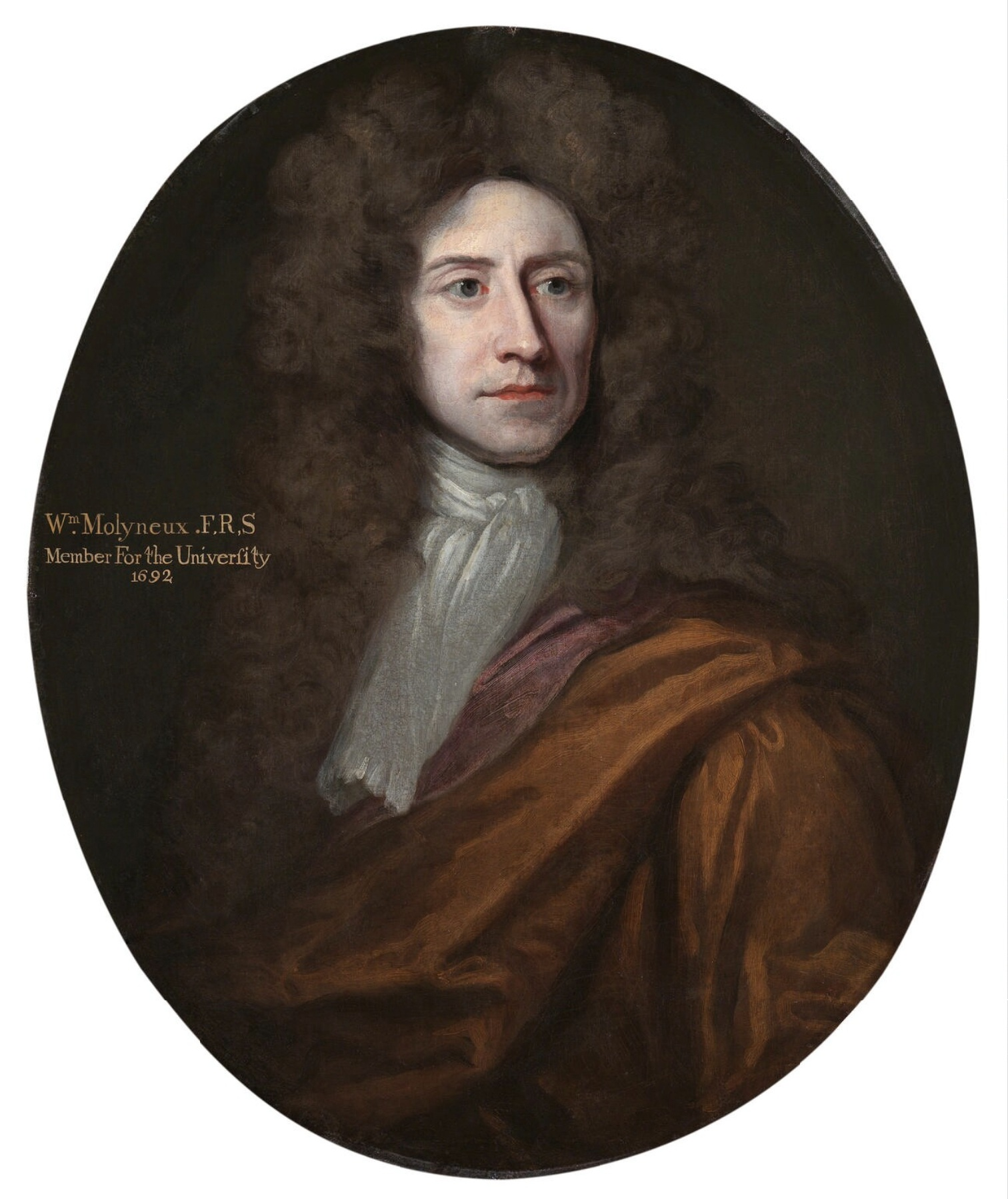
William Molyneux, a founding member of the society

The Dublin Philosophical Society was founded in 1683 by William Molyneux with the assistance of his brother Sir Thomas Molyneux and the future Provost and Bishop St George Ashe. It was intended to be the equivalent of the Royal Society in London (with which it maintained cultural ties) as well as the Philosophical Society at the University of Oxford. Whilst it had a sometimes close connection with the Royal College of Physicians of Ireland, its closest institutional connection was with Trinity College Dublin.

== Society ==
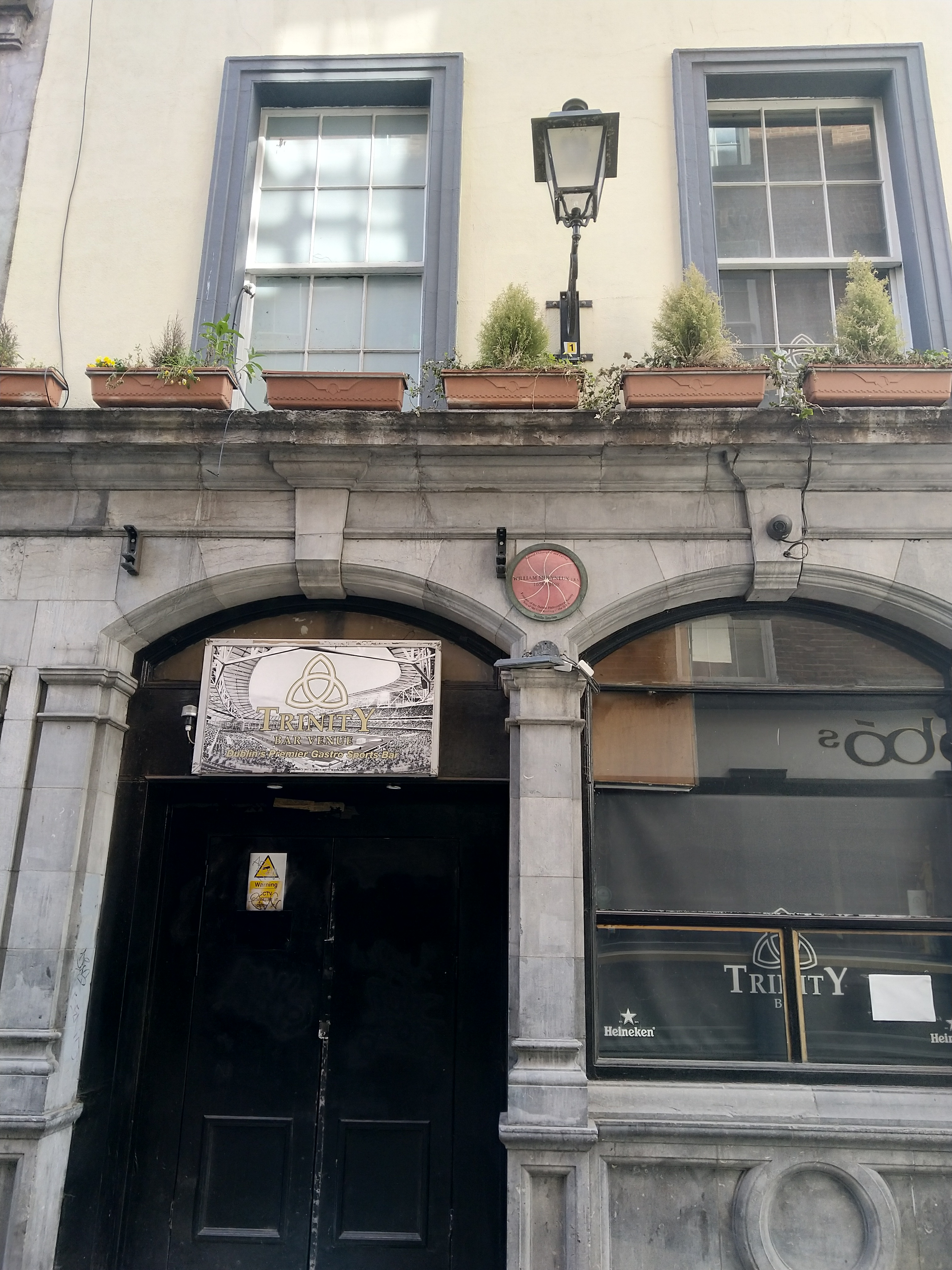
Circular plaque (in red, on the right-hand side of the door) marking the site of the first meeting of the Dublin Philosophical Society

The society was originally intended to be a paper reading society, however it also included many demonstrations of the latest science and mathematical endeavour of the time. Members would meet regularly within Trinity College Dublin and at Crow Street, Temple Bar, Dublin at a location commonly referred to as "The Crow's Nest". This location housed the society's garden and laboratory, as well as containing a large meeting room and a small repository for the society's belongings. Among its most prominent members were William Petty, Archbishop Narcissus Marsh, Archbishop William King and Bishop George Berkeley. The majority of its members were graduates of Trinity College, Dublin, a number of whom were Fellows, including the then current and later Provost of the college. Although it played a small role in intellectual Dublin life, it inspired the foundation of the Dublin Society founded in 1731 (which became the Royal Dublin Society in 1820) and the Royal Irish Academy in 1785. Whilst at the time no particular precedent existed for Trinity College, Dublin to recognise it, it can be considered the college's first such society.

== History ==
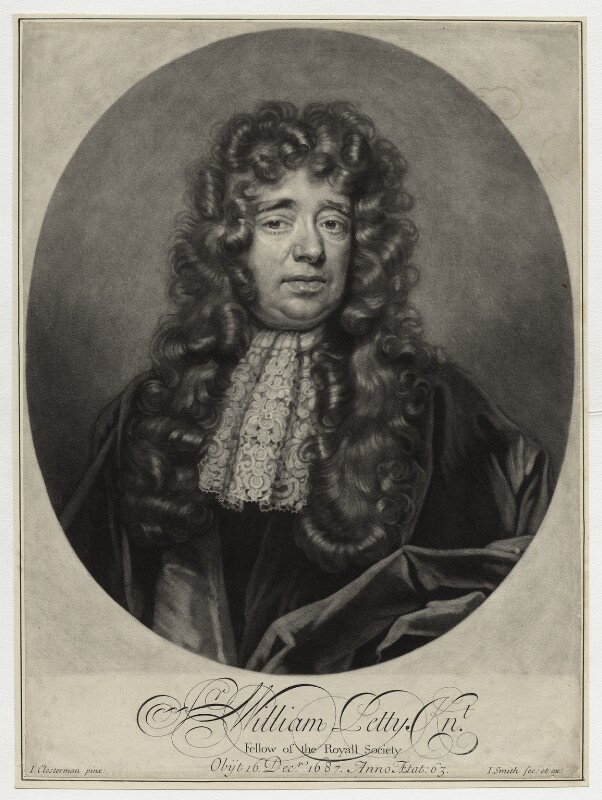
William Petty, first elected President of the Society.

The Dublin Philosophical Society had a somewhat tumultuous existence. It held its first meeting on 15 October 1683 within the Provost's lodgings at Trinity College Dublin, however it is thought to have existed from sometime in September 1683. It existed most prominently from 1683 until 1698, 1701 until 1731.

Having garnered a significant reputation of studious diligence, on 18 December 1683, then Provost Robert Huntington acting on behalf of the society wrote to Robert Plot of the Royal Society asking for assistance in printing the papers of its members. Hereafter the relationship between both societies became cemented, with many papers being printed in Philosophical Transactions and for a number of years the society flourished, circulating papers from various academic fields. From then on, the Provost played a vital role in protection and assistance of the society, becoming its Senior Patron, a role the position still holds.

Provisionally Dr Charles Willoughby was placed in charge of the society. On 1 November 1684 William Petty was duly elected the first president of the society, with William Molyneux elected as the first secretary.

The appointment of Richard Talbot as Lord Deputy of Ireland impeded some work of the society to a small degree, having earlier petitioned James II to deny the society of a royal charter in 1686.

The society struggled greatly during the Revolution of 1688, a time which during few meetings took place, but papers were still presented to members. Finally struggling on until the year 1698, when, due to political upheaval the society was forced to adjourn for almost ten years, sometimes meeting sporadically from some time after the Battle of the Boyne. During this time William Molyneux died and the society did not recommence activity until 1701 when his son Samuel Molyneux was elected Secretary.

Sir Thomas Molyneux is recorded as having been a continued member of society in all its incarnations and most likely continued to be until his death in 1733.

== Council and Members of the Dublin Philosophical Society ==
Having been at what seems the centre of learned culture in 17th century Dublin, the society boasted many historically famous members. Many of these were members, fellows, professors of Trinity College Dublin, clergymen, medical practitioners and members of the judiciary.

=== Council ===
Dating of the society's sessions are counted from 1 November 1684, due to the first elections of officers taking place at that time.

Senior Patron	Robert Huntington, Provost of Trinity College.
Officers of the Dublin Philosophical Society, 5th Session
President	Sir William Petty
Director	Dr. Charles Willoughby
Treasurer	William Pleydall
Secretary	William Molyneux

=== Members of the Society ===
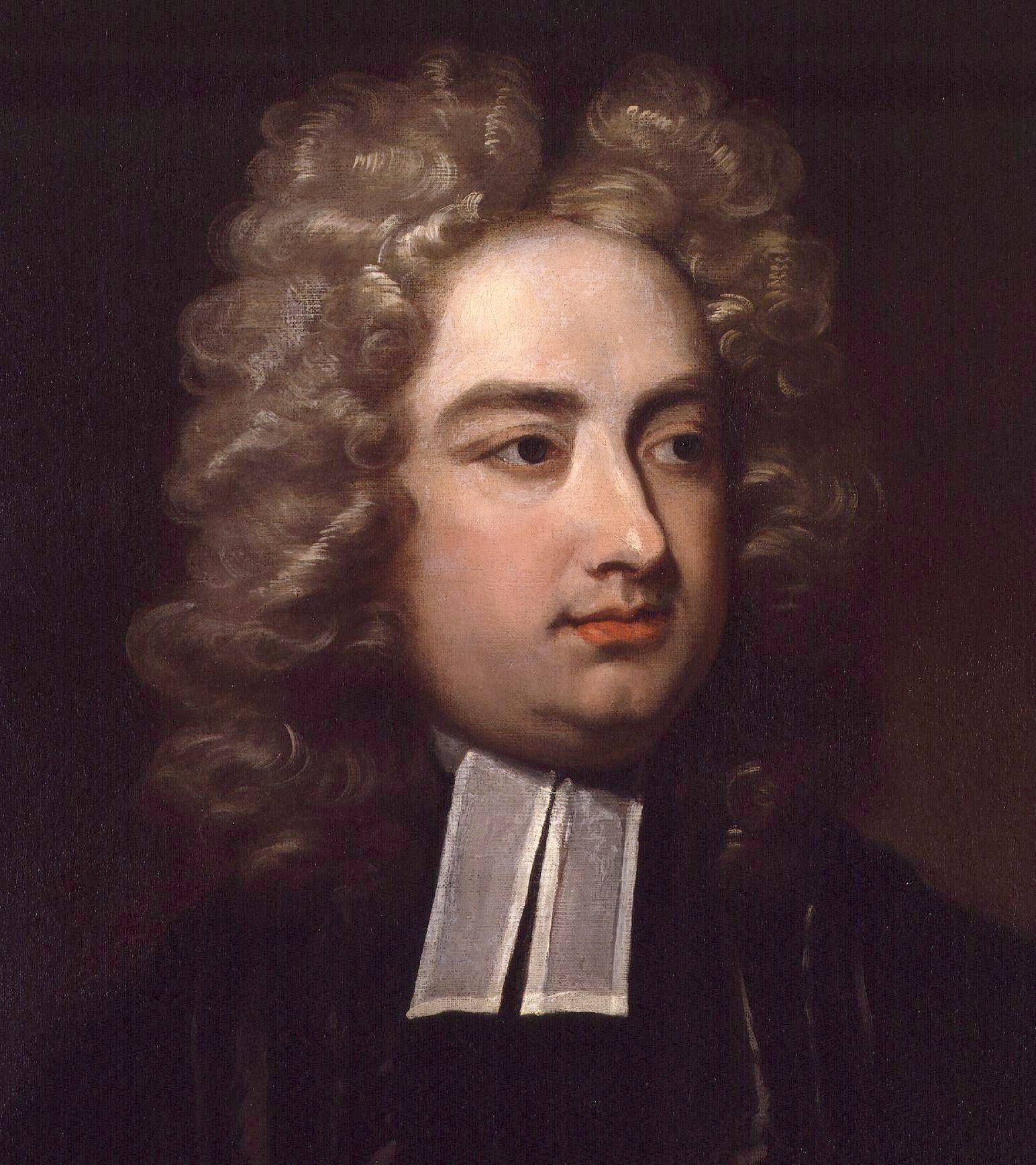
Jonathan Swift, member of the society.

What follows is a complete list of known members of the society.

- William Stewart, 1st Viscount Mountjoy.
- Robert Reading, first and last Baronet Reading.
- George Berkeley, Anglo-Irish philosopher.
- Cyril Wyche, Chief Secretary for Ireland.
- Sir Richard Bulkeley, 2nd Baronet, Fellow of Trinity College.
- Samuel Foley, Bishop of Down and Connor, one of the earliest members of the society.
- Dudley Loftus, Vicar General of Ireland, Judge of the Prerogative Court of Ireland, Senior Master of Chancery and great-grandson of Adam Loftus.
- Allan Mullen, eminent Irish anatomist.
- William King, Archbishop of Dublin, Scholar of Trinity College Dublin.
- Thomas Herbert, 8th Earl of Pembroke, Lord President of the Council and Lord Lieutenant of Ireland.
- St George Ashe, Bishop of Cloyne, Fellow, Provost of Trinity College Dublin.
- Jonathan Swift, Anglo-Irish satirist, essayist, political pamphleteer.
- William Palliser, Professor of Divinity at Trinity College Dublin, Bishop of Cloyne and Archbishop of Cashel.
- Sir Thomas Molyneux, 1st Baronet, Irish physician and Fellow of the Royal Society.
- Samuel Molyneux, son of William Molyneux, elected secretary of the society in 1706.

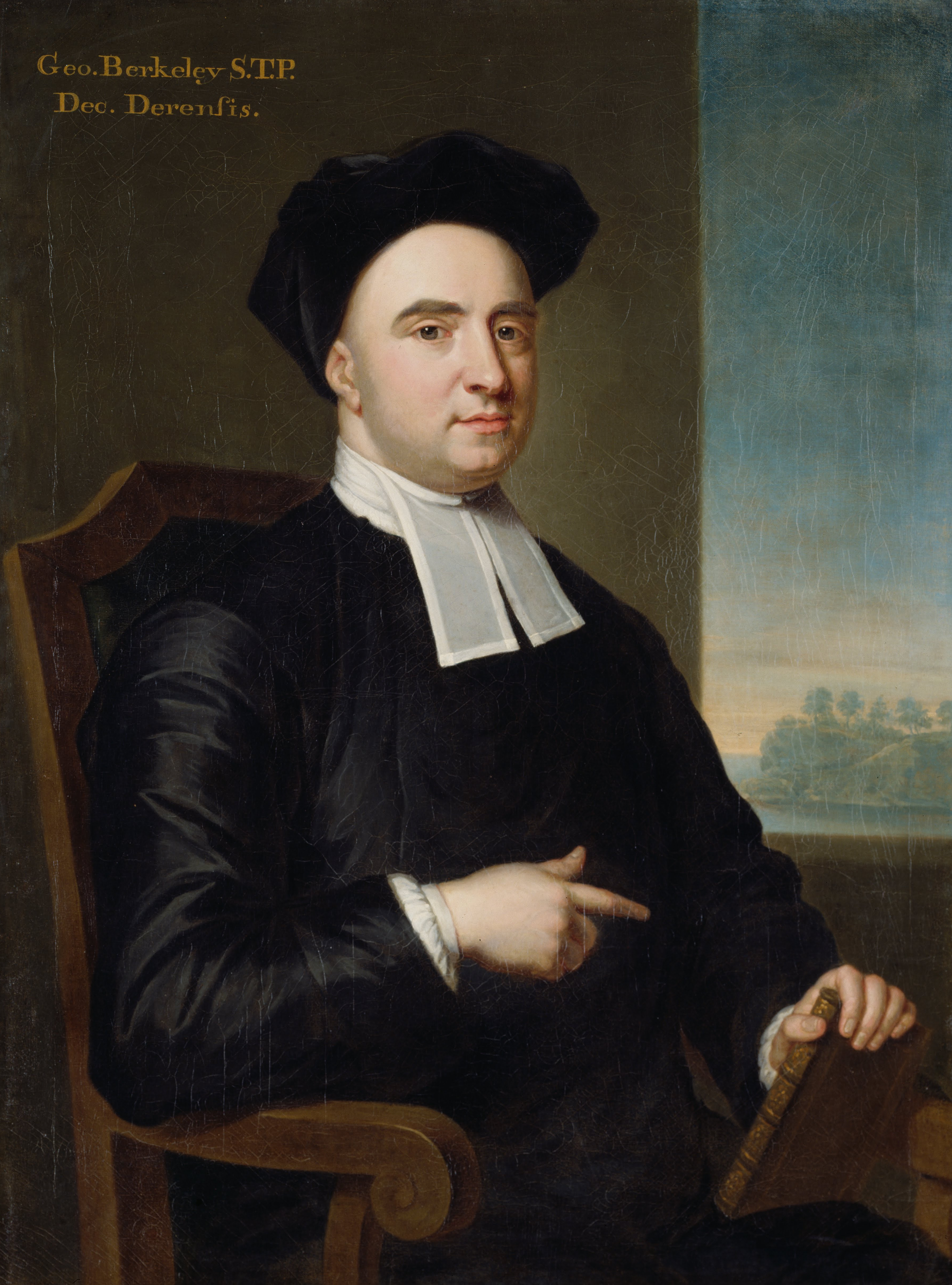
George Berkeley, who presented a paper entitled "Of Infinites", in November 1707.

- John Madden, father of Samuel Madden who co-founded the Royal Dublin Society.
- John Bulkeley (most likely brother of Sir Richard Bulkeley, 2nd Baronet).
- Robert Clements, father of Irish politician and financial figure Nathaniel Clements.
- Francis Cuff, friend of William Molyneux who lived in Peter's Place.
- Dr. Sir Christopher Dominick, father of Elizabeth Dominick who was grandmother of Augustus FitzGerald, 3rd Duke of Leinster and for whom Dominick Street is named.
- Edward Smyth, Professor, Fellow of Trinity College, Dublin and Bishop of Down and Connor.
- John Worth, Dean of St. Patrick's Cathedral.
- Richard Acton, Fellow of Trinity College.
- Dr. Richard Chamberlin.
- John Baynard, Archdeacon of Connor.
- Sir Patrick Dun, physician, and president of the Royal College of Physicians of Ireland.
- Henry Eenerly.
- J. Finglass.
- Mark Baggot.
- Dr. Daniel Houlaghan.
- John Keogh

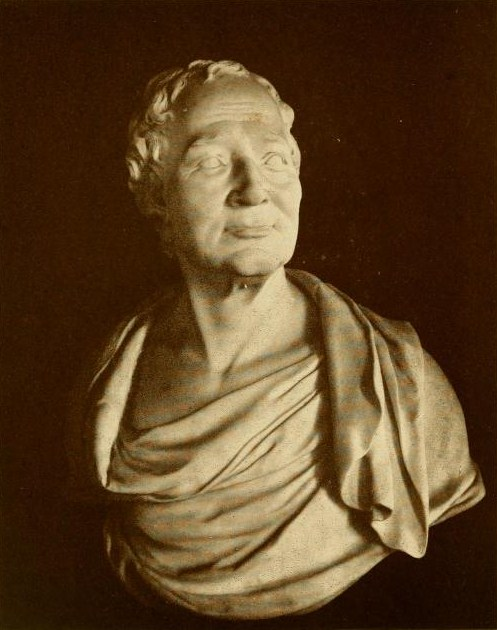
Thomas Prior, member after the society's revival in the early 18th Century.

- John Stanley.
- Jacobus Silvius.
- Samuel Walkington, Archdeacon of Ossory, elected to the society in 1693.
- Paul Rieaut.
- Sir John Hely, Chief Baron of the Irish Exchequer and Chief Justice of the Irish Common Pleas.
- Sir Richard Cox, Lord Chancellor of Ireland and Lord Chief Justice of the Queen's Bench for Ireland
- Bryan Robinson, physician, academic and writer.
- Richard Helsham, physician, fellow of Trinity College, Dublin, and first to hold the professorship of natural philosophy on the foundation of Erasmus Smith.
- Thomas Prior, author, and founder of the Royal Dublin Society.
- Samuel Madden, author, and founder of the Royal Dublin Society.

== Continuation of the Society ==
The Dublin Philosophical Society continued under the new guise of the Medico-Philosophical Society, from 1756 until 1831. John Rutty, Dr. Hugh Hamilton (uncle to later University Philosophical Society Patron George Alexander Hamilton), David MacBride, George Cleghorn, all of whom had delivered several papers to the Dublin Philosophical Society and continued the practice of paper reading. The papers presented could cover natural history, natural philosophy, medicine, ethics, as well as politics, similar in style and subject matter to those of the Dublin Philosophical Society. Whilst a significant proportion of the members had studied at Trinity College Dublin it was predominantly aligned with Royal College of Physicians of Ireland.

While the society may have existed outside of Trinity College Dublin for the first time in seventy-three years, the tradition established by the society of having academic papers published in Philosophical Transactions continued in within the college.

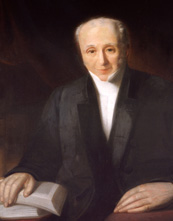
Franc Sadlier, Provost of Trinity College, and Senior Patron of the society upon its restoration.

== Inspiration for other societies ==
The society was the inspiration for the Royal Dublin Society which had its first meeting in the society's rooms in 1731.

It also inspired the cadet society, the Physio-Historical Society of the Royal College of Physicians of Ireland, lasting from 1744 until 1777.

The Royal Irish Academy founded in 1785, drew the inspiration for its creation from the society.
