= John Lentaigne =

Irish administrator, lawyer and Privy Counsellor

Rt. Hon. Sir John Francis O'Neill Lentaigne CB (21 June 1803 – 12 November 1886) was an Irish administrator, lawyer and Privy Counsellor.

== Life ==
He was born 21 June 1803 in Tallaght, Dublin. His father was physician Dr. Benjamin Lentaigne of Dominick Street, Dublin, an immigrant from France. His mother was Marie Thérèse O'Neill, daughter of John O'Neill. He was one of the first pupils to attend school at Clongowes Wood College. He graduated from Trinity College and with a medical degree.

He was a Privy Counsellor for Ireland from 1886. He served as a Justice of the Peace and Deputy Lieutenant for County Monaghan and was appointed High Sheriff of Monaghan for 1844–45. He became a member of the Prisons Board and was Inspector-General of Prisons in Ireland from 1854 to 1877 and Commissioner of National Education. He was president of the Statistical and Social Inquiry Society of Ireland between 1877 and 1878 and president of the Royal Zoological Society of Ireland.

He was invested as a Companion of the Order of the Bath and made a Knight of the Order of Pius IX.

He married Mary, the daughter and co-heiress of Francis Magan of Emoe, Westmeath, with whom he had 12 children. One son, John Vincent Lentaigne, also became a doctor.

== Arms ==
Coat of arms of John Lentaigne

Notes
Confirmed 15 September 1862 by Sir John Bernard Burke, Ulster King of Arms
Crest
A dove with wings endorsed Proper holding in its bill a fleur de lis Or and charged on the breast with a mullet Azure.
Escutcheon
Or on a chevron Azure between three martlets Sable a fleur de lis of the first a chief of the second charged with three mullets Argent.
Motto
Dieu Ayde
