= Edward Charles Lentaigne =

Lieutenant-Colonel Edward Charles Lentaigne DSO (16 June 1884 – 28 July 1962) was a British Indian Army officer of the 4th Gurkha Rifles.

He married Cecilia Mary Bunbury. His daughter was the medical artist Mollie Lentaigne and his son was second lieutenant John Wilfred O'Neill Lentaigne MC of the Rifle Brigade who died in 1942 at El Alamein during the Second World War.
