= Sciothericum telescopicum =

Sciothericum telescopicum was a sundial (sciothericum) that incorporated a telescope (telescopicum) for greater accuracy in determining exactly when noon occurred. It was invented by William Molyneux in Ireland in 1686. The device used a telescopic sight to determine the position of the center of the Sun relative to a double gnomon and could thus determine the time of noon to within 15 seconds. The improved accuracy was important for geography, navigation and astronomy calculations.
