= East Grinstead Museum =

Local history museum in East Grinstead, England

Coordinates: 51°07′28″N 0°00′23″W

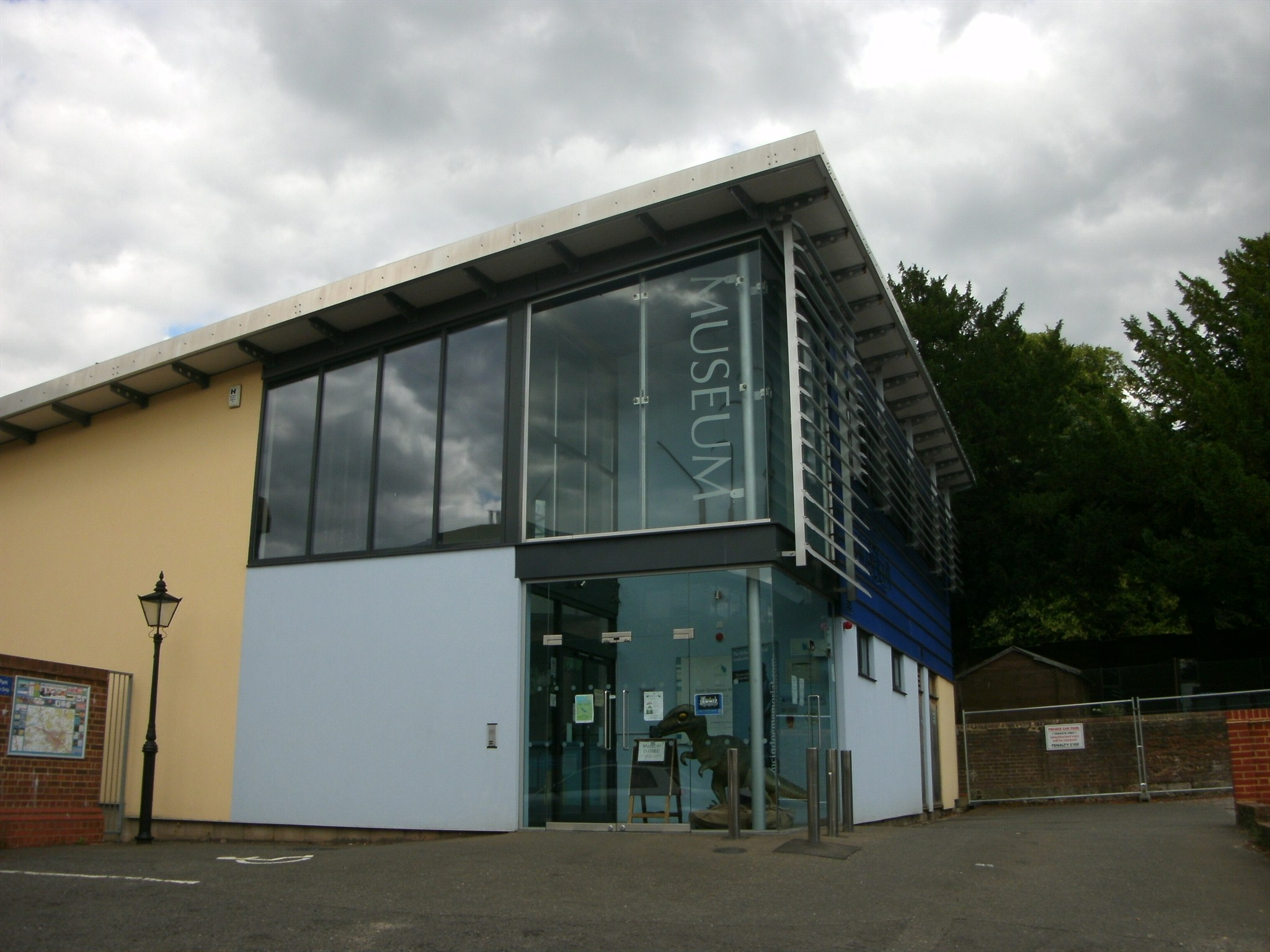
- Established: 1995
- Location: East Grinstead, West Sussex, England
- Type: Local history museum
- Website: eastgrinsteadmuseum.org

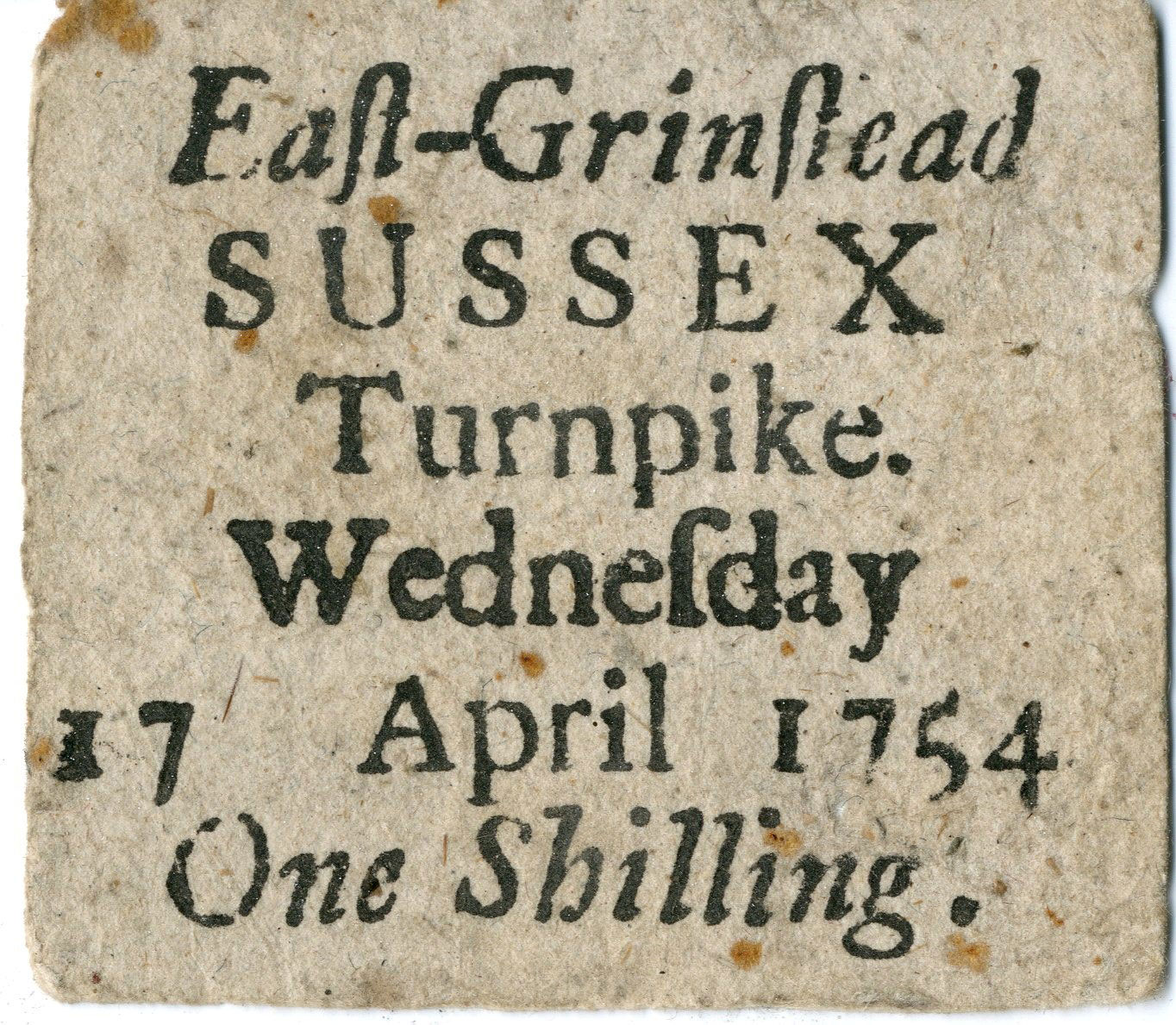
East-Grinstead Sussex Turnpike ticket 1754 from the museum's collection.

East Grinstead Museum is located at Cantelupe Road in East Grinstead, West Sussex, England.

It was established in 1995 in a purpose-built museum constructed with funding from the Heritage Lottery Fund and local donations. It replaced the town's first museum opened in 1926 in the St Swithun's Church tower under the supervision of the reverend Golding Golding-Bird. The first museum closed in 1955. The East Grinstead Society opened the East Grinstead Town Museum in 1976, using three rooms at East Court. The museum was accredited in 1995 and moved to a new site in September 2006.

Notable collections include material relating to the Guinea Pig Club for former plastic surgery patients of the Queen Victoria Hospital in East Grinstead during the Second World War, and the associated medical drawings of Mollie Lentaigne.
