= Dominick Street, Dublin =

Georgian street in Dublin, Ireland

Dominick Street
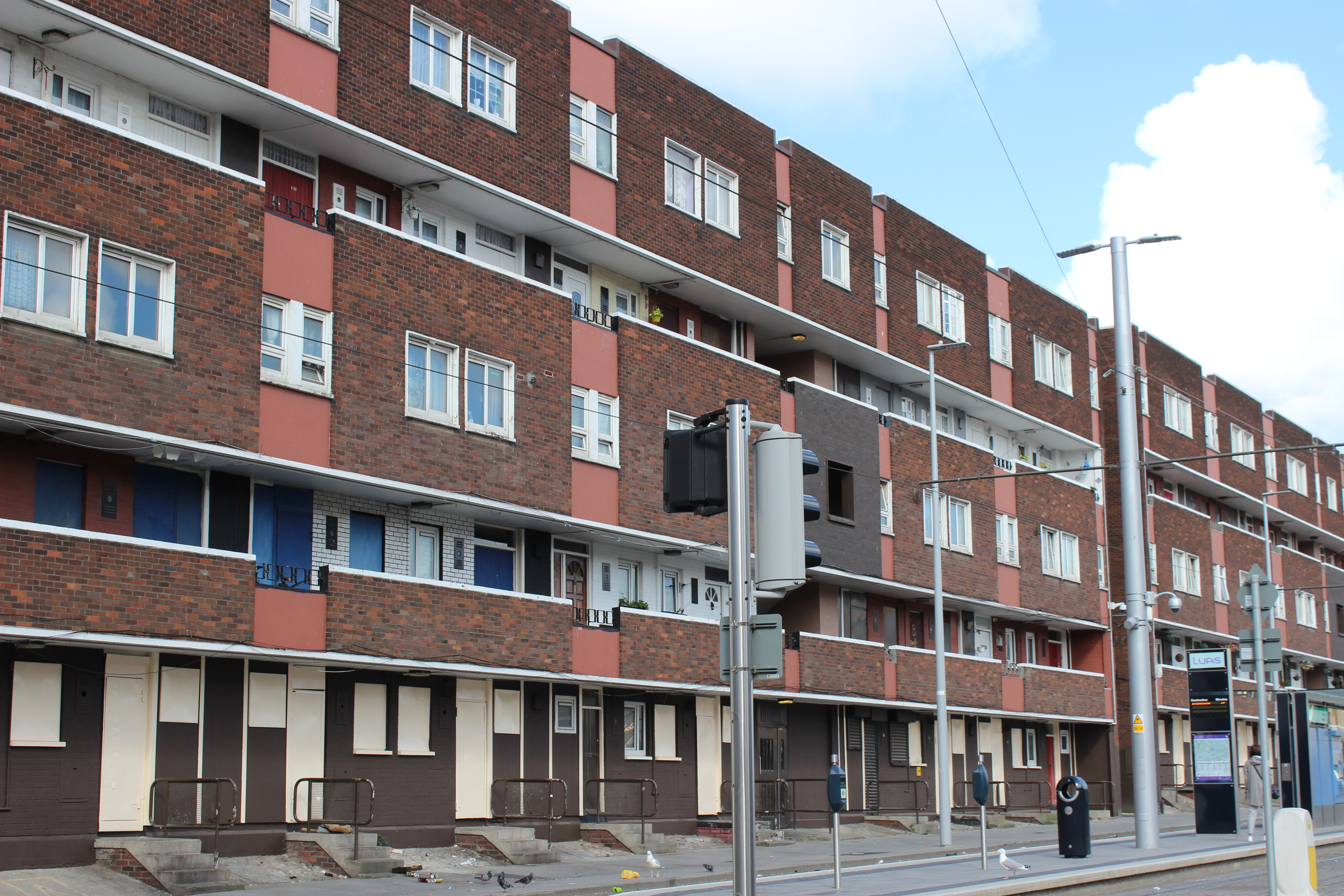
- 1960s Dublin Corporation flats on Lower Dominick Street photographed in 2019.
- Native name: Sráid Dhoiminic (Irish)
- Namesake: Christopher Dominick
- Location: Dublin, Ireland
- Postal code: D01
- North end: Broadstone
- South end: Parnell Street

Construction
- Construction start: 1740s
- Demolished: Large parts of Lower Dominick Street (1958)

Other
- Known for: Georgian houses and tenements

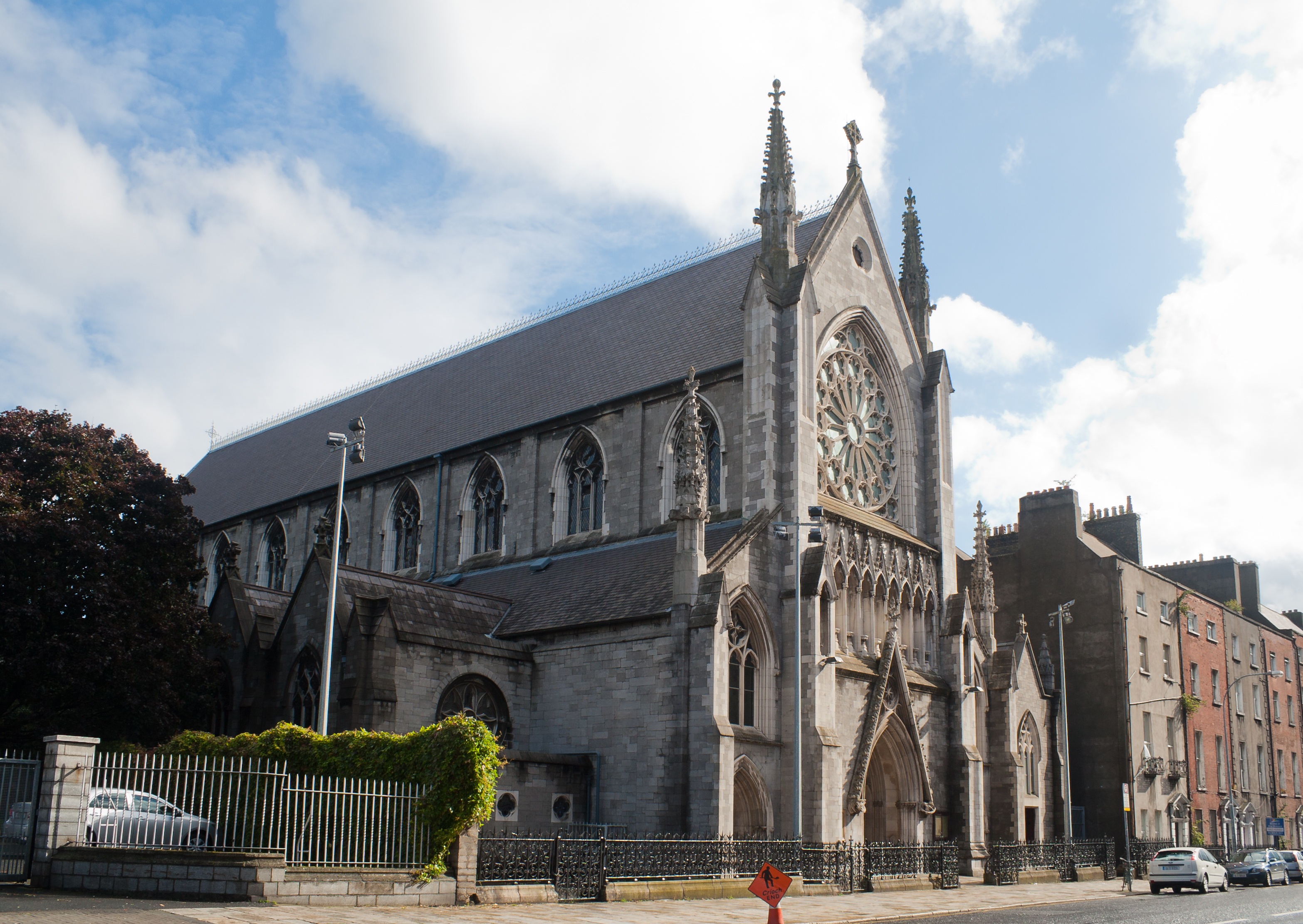
Saint Saviour's Dominican Priory Church and Georgian housing.

Dominick Street (Irish: Sráid Dhoiminic) is a street on the North side of Dublin city laid out by the physician Sir Christopher Dominick and further developed by his family after his death in 1743. The lands had originally been acquired by Dominick in 1709.

The Luas Green Line runs through part of the street and there is a Dominick Luas stop on Lower Dominick Street.

Dominick Street Lower is connected to Parnell Street at its southern end while the junction of Bolton Street and Dorset Street bisects the street before Dominick Street Upper intersects with Western Way and Constitution Hill at its Northern end near Broadstone.

== History ==
=== 18th century ===
The street was one of the earliest Georgian streets to be laid out on the North side of the city after nearby Henrietta Street had been the first in the area to be developed. It was originally only made up of what is today Lower Dominick Street and consequently is sometimes referred to as Old Dominick Street on some maps. The area began to be built on by the 1720s. The first lease is recorded in 1727 made out to Lady Alice Hume at the corner of Great Britain Street which was bounded by the house of Dominick. The area was however still shown as mainly open land on Charles Brooking's Map of Dublin of 1728.

In the early 1750s, Sir Christopher Dominick's widow and son of the same name let lots to various developers and builders along what is today Dominick Street Lower. His daughter Elizabeth assisted with this and she later married St George St George, 1st Baron St George in July 1752 around the same time.

Later Sir Christopher Dominick's sole grand daughter, Emily Olivia, would marry William FitzGerald, 2nd Duke of Leinster with their new home on the street remaining in family ownership as their city residence up to its replacement in the 1950s by social housing.

The street is featured on John Rocque's Map of Dublin in 1756 with no buildings along its sides. The street soon became a fashionable upmarket address for members of the gentry and aristocracy.

At the time of its development, the street was one of the finest and most fashionable Georgian streets in Dublin. As of 2025, some notable rococo stucco work by Robert West can still be seen in the interior of 20 Lower Dominick Street, the largest remaining and originally one of the finest houses on the street which marked a high point in the late baroque interiors of Georgian Dublin which lasted from around 1740-75.

In the 1780s, whilst the Royal Canal was still in planning stage, it was initially envisaged that a harbour be located at the intersection of Dominick Street and Bolton Street, until the price of land prevented this location, and the harbour was relocated to Broadstone instead. Later, in the 1840s, Broadstone Railway Station was built alongside the canal basin.

=== 19th century ===
Upper Dominick Street was opened later around 1808 and consequently was sometimes referred to as New Dominick Street. The houses were significantly more modest in their design.

After the Acts of Union 1800, both ends of the street fell gradually into decline. In the first half of the century, the houses continued to be owned or leased by members of the middle and merchant classes such as the legal profession, owing to the streets proximity to the King's Inns and the Four Courts. Towards the end of the century, residents began selling their houses on the street or leasing them to other residents as tenements.

In 1853, St Saviour's Priory began to be constructed on the lower section of the street near the junction with Dorset Street. It was designed by James Joseph McCarthy, with a planned tower and spire not built.

Between 1875 and 1880 a number of social housing blocks named the Temple Buildings were constructed on the street to a design by Thomas Newenham Deane.

=== 20th century ===
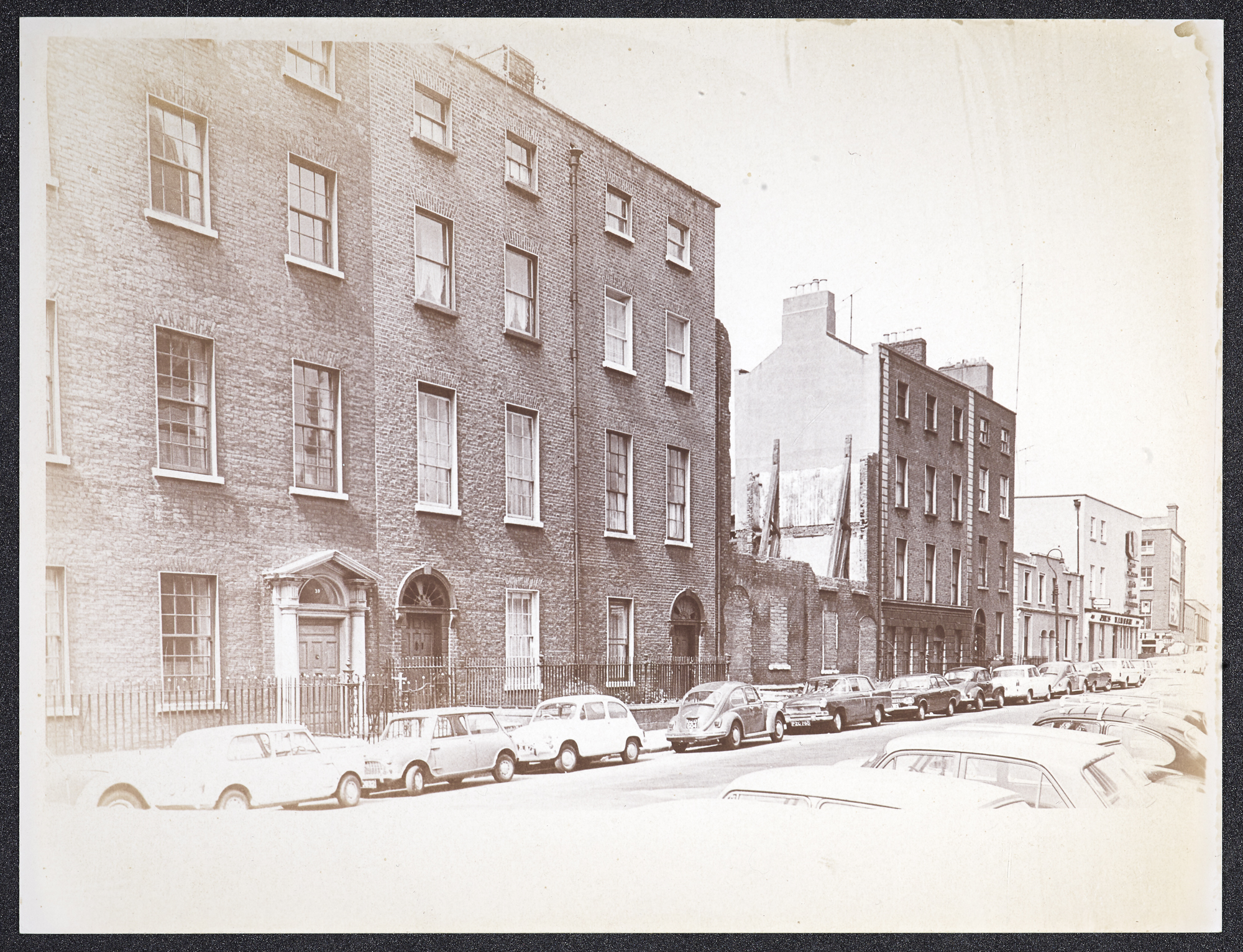
Lower Dominick Street, Dublin (1968)

Most of the original Georgian houses on the street became tenements between the late 19th and mid 20th century and were demolished or fell into ruin from the 1950s to the early 1990s.

In the census of 1911, 40 people were recorded as living in 16 Lower Dominick Street alone while there were 372 combined in the first 8 houses on the street.

In 1958 large parts of Lower Dominick Street were cleared with the space later replaced with Dublin Corporation flats designed by Desmond FitzGerald in the 1960s.

In 1949, the modernist Hendron's garage was constructed towards the end of Upper Dominick Street.

=== 21st century ===
Between 2018 and 2022, a new block of 72 social housing apartments named Dominick Hall were constructed as part of a larger regeneration scheme for the street.

As of 2023, only 10 of the original Georgian houses remain, with all listed on the record of protected structures.

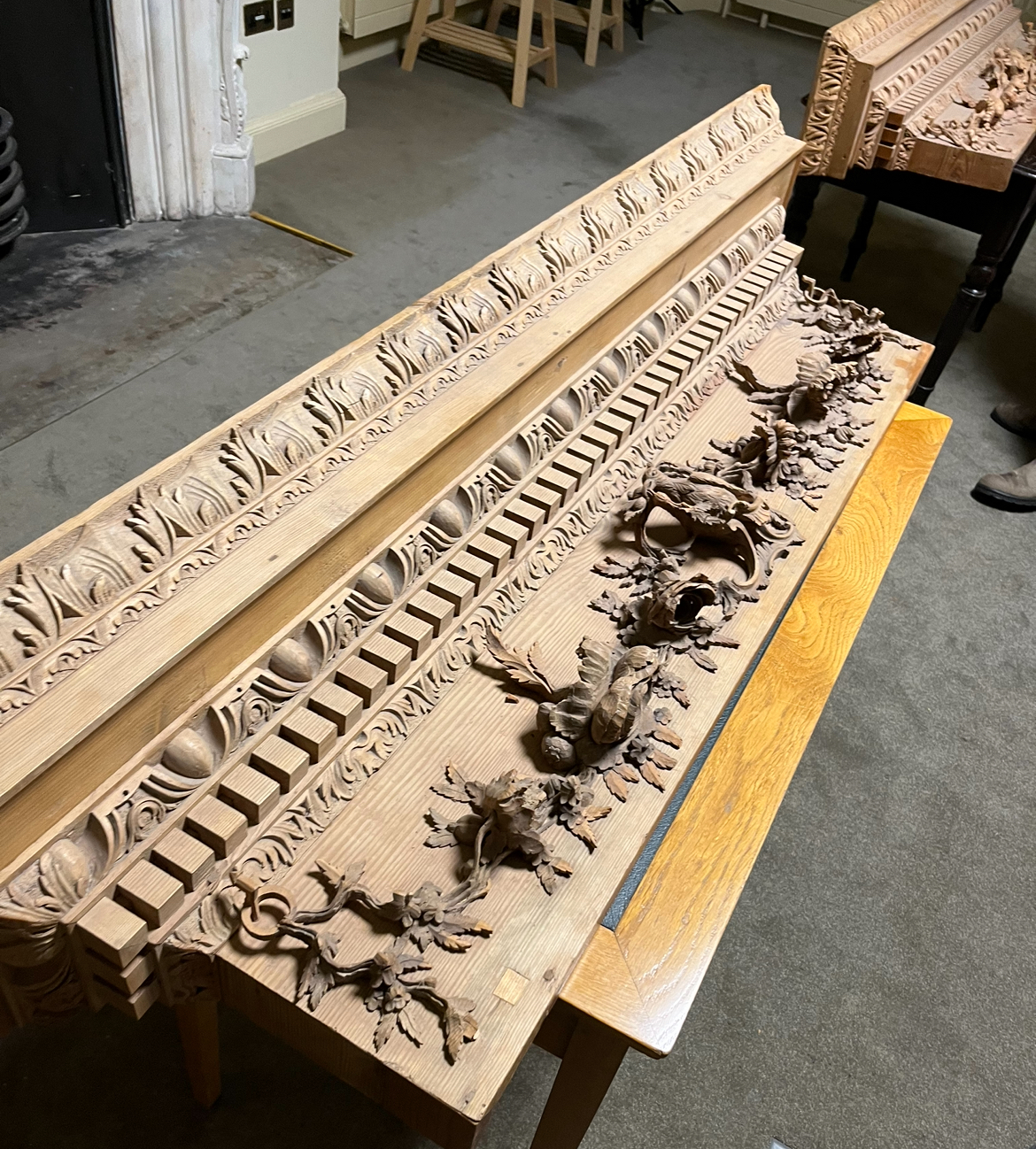
Over door entablature and frieze taken from 20 Dominick Street

== Notable owners and residents ==
Various notable owners and residents lived on the street, particularly during the late 18th century.

- William Connolly & Son contractors to the catholic church were located at 37-39 Upper Dominick Street
- Tony Felloni, 1980s Dublin drug dealer
- Edward FitzGerald, 7th Duke of Leinster, inherited 13 Lower Dominick Street, the Leinster Estate office. The building was later demolished in 1958.
- Sir William Fownes, 2nd Baronet, granddaughter Marianne-Caroline Hamilton and their cousin Sarah Ponsonby, one of the Ladies of Llangollen lived at number 40
- Arthur Griffith was born at 61 Upper Dominick Street
- William Rowan Hamilton lived at 29 Dominick Street, later renumbered to 36
- The Earls of Howth owned number 41
- Sheridan Le Fanu born in number 52
- Benjamin Lentaigne and his son John Lentaigne
- Leonard McNally lived at 57
- Sydney, Lady Morgan partially resided at the Fetherstonhaugh house on the street for a period
- Cusack Roney (1781–1849), Irish physician and President of the Royal College of Surgeons in Ireland (RCSI) in 1814 and 1828
- Catherine Rooney born in the street
- Henry Rose, politician, lived on the street
- Sir Richard Steele, 1st Baronet
- Robert West - built 20 Dominick Street, later sold to Robert Marshall circa 1758, later John Beresford and later succeeded by Sir Charles Ffrench, 1st Baron ffrench and his daughter Rose ffrench, 1st Baroness ffrench

== Sources ==
- Clarke, Peter (1993-02-17). "The Royal Canal 1789-1993". Dublin Historical Record. 46 (1). Dublin: Old Dublin Society: 46–52. JSTOR 30101021.
