= St Peter's Church, Hockwold =

Coordinates: 52.4628°N 0.5376°E

St Peter's, Hockwold
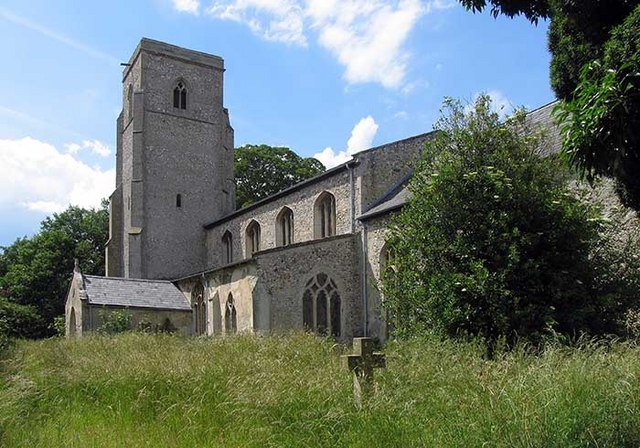

- Location in Norfolk
- OS grid reference: TL 7249188015
- Location: Hockwold cum Wilton, Norfolk
- Denomination: Anglican
- Website: Churches Conservation Trust

Architecture
- Functional status: Redundant
- Heritage designation: Grade I
- Designated: 8 July 1959

Specifications
- Materials: Flint with ashlar dressings

St Peter's Church is a redundant Anglican church in the village of Hockwold cum Wilton in Norfolk, England. It is recorded in the National Heritage List for England as a designated Grade I listed building, and is under the care of the Churches Conservation Trust.

== History ==
St Peter's was formerly the parish church of Hockwold, before that village joined with neighbouring Wilton to form Hockwold cum Wilton. The nave and the tower date from the mid-14th century. A chancel was added in the 15th century. The church underwent restoration in 1857. Up until the 17th century, the parishes of St Peter, Hockwold, and St James, Wilton were separate but from 1666 they shared a rector and services alternated between the two churches. Eventually, St Peter's became redundant. In 1959 the church was designated a Grade I listed building by English Heritage. The Grade I listing is for buildings "of exceptional interest, sometimes considered to be internationally important". It is now cared for by the Churches Conservation Trust.

== Architecture ==
=== Exterior ===
The church is constructed in flint with ashlar dressings; the roofs are slate. Its plan consists of a nave with a south aisle, chancel, south porch and south-west tower. The tower is of two stages with stepped angled buttresses. It is decorated with freestone quoins. There are two-light belfry windows and the window in the west wall of the tower also has two lights and is reticulated. The bell-ringing chamber has rounded lancets. In 1805, the tower contained three bells. The church windows include three-light clerestory windows with supermullions and a three-light east window in the Perpendicular style below a quatrefoil oculus.

=== Interior ===
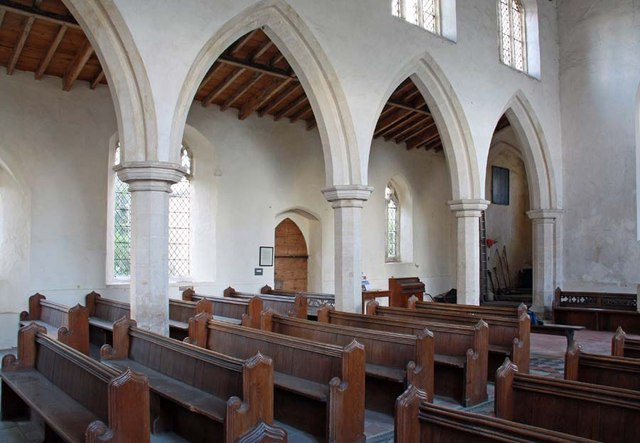
The south arcade of St Peter's church

Internally, the nave measures approximately 14 metres (46 ft) by 11 metres (36 ft). The roof has alternating tie beams and false hammer beams. The south aisle is separated from the nave by a four-bay arcade which has octagonal piers and double chamfered arches. The aisle contains a bench sedile and a piscina. The chancel measures approximately 11 metres (36 ft) by 7 metres (23 ft). The south wall has three stone ogeed arches indicating the position of sedilia for the bishop, priest and deacon. There is also an ogeed piscina; both these features of the chancel date from the 19th century. To the left of the east window is a wall monument to Sir Cyril Wyche who died in 1780. Sir Cyril was one of the first members of the Royal Society.

=== Churchyard ===
The churchyard of St Peter's contains a monument which has been given a Grade II listing by English Heritage. Lying 3 metres (9.8 ft) south of the church tower, the monument is a square headstone of ashlar.

== See also ==
- Grade I listed buildings in Norfolk
- List of churches preserved by the Churches Conservation Trust in the East of England
