= Richard Aldworth (MP for Dublin University) =

Anglo-Irish politician and official

Sir Richard Aldworth

Chief Secretary for Ireland

Member of the [[Irish House of Commons Parliament]] for Dublin University
- In office 1693–1696
- Preceded by: Sir Cyril Wyche
- Succeeded by: William Palmer
- In office 1695–1699
- Preceded by: Sir Cyril Wyche
- Succeeded by: Sir William Robinson / Edward Southwell

Personal details
- Born: 1646
- Died: 1707 (aged 60–61)
- Occupation: Politician, Official

Sir Richard Aldworth (1646 – 1707) was an Anglo-Irish politician and official in the Dublin Castle administration in Ireland.

Aldworth was the Chief Secretary for Ireland from 1693 to 1696, and in 1695 he was made a member of the Privy Council of Ireland. He was a Member of Parliament for Dublin University in the Irish House of Commons between 1695 and 1699.

Political offices
Preceded by Sir Cyril Wyche	Chief Secretary for Ireland; 1693–1696	Succeeded by William Palmer
Parliament of Ireland
Preceded by Sir Cyril Wyche; William Molyneux	Member of Parliament for Dublin University; 1695–1699; With: William Molyneux (1695–1698); William Crow (1698–1699)	Succeeded by Sir William Robinson; Edward Southwell
