= Allan Mullen =

Allan Mullen, FRS, M.D. (also Mullin, Moulin, Molines) (died 1690) was an Irish anatomist.

== Life ==
He was born in the north of Ireland, and was educated at Trinity College Dublin, where he graduated B.A. and M.B. in 1676, and M.D. in 1684. In the latter year he was apparently elected fellow of the College of Physicians in Ireland.

He attempted original research in anatomy, and became a prominent member of the Dublin Philosophical Society, to which he contributed valuable papers on human and comparative anatomy. The most important was that in which he described the vascularity of the lens of the eye, to the discovery of which he appears to have been led by the dissection of an elephant. On 18 July 1683 he was elected a Fellow of the Royal Society.

A discreditable love affair obliged him to remove to London in 1686, and thence he went with William O'Brien, 2nd Earl of Inchiquin, in 1690 to the West Indies, hoping to improve his fortunes by the discovery of some mines there. He died soon after landing at Barbados from the effects of intoxication.

== Works ==
Mullen published 'An Anatomical Account of the Elephant accidentally burnt in Dublin on 17 June 1681; together with a Relation of new Anatomical Observations on the Eyes of Animals. By A. M.,' &c., 2 pts. 4to, London, 1682.

His examination was made with such accuracy that his descriptions have been quoted by writers down to the present time. The 'Philosophical Transactions' for 1685 contain an account of his dissection of a 'monstrous double cat' (xv. 1135). In the volume for 1687, he gave a close estimate of the quantity of blood contained in the body (xvi. 433). His experiments 'On the Injection of Mercury into the Blood' (xvii. 486), 'On a Black shining Sand brought from Virginia' (xvii. 624), and 'Anatomical Observations on the Heads of Fowls' (xvii. 711) are also recorded. His discovery of several structures in the tunics of the eye is acknowledged by Albrecht von Haller.
