= Chief Secretary for Ireland =

Political office of the Dublin Castle administration (1566–1922)

- Arms of the Kingdom of Ireland
- Style: The Right Honourable as a member of the Privy Council
- Residence: Chief Secretary's Lodge (from 1776)
- Appointer: The Lord Lieutenant
- Term length: At the pleasure of the Lord Lieutenant
- Inaugural holder: Edward Waterhouse
- Formation: 20 January 1566
- Final holder: Sir Hamar Greenwood
- Abolished: 19 October 1922

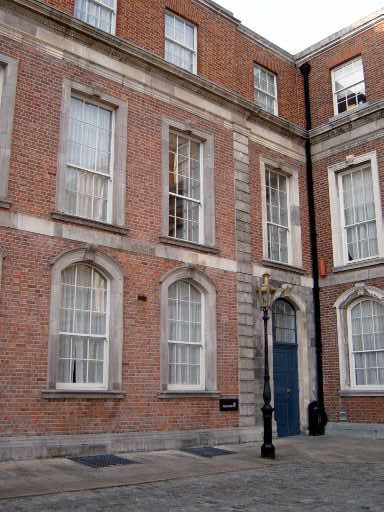
The Chief Secretary's office in Dublin Castle. The Chief Secretary's residence was the Chief Secretary's Lodge in the Phoenix Park, next to the Viceregal Lodge.

The Chief Secretary for Ireland was a political office in the Dublin Castle administration. Nominally subordinate to the Lord Lieutenant of Ireland, and officially the "Chief Secretary to the Lord Lieutenant", from the early 19th century until 1921 he was effectively the government minister with responsibility for governing Ireland, roughly equivalent to the role of a Secretary of State, such as the similar role of Secretary of State for Scotland. Usually it was the Chief Secretary, rather than the Lord Lieutenant, who sat in the Cabinet of the United Kingdom. The Chief Secretary was ex officio President of the Local Government Board for Ireland from its creation in 1872.

British rule in Ireland came to an end through most of the island as a result of the Irish War of Independence, which culminated in the establishment of the Irish Free State. In consequence, the office of Chief Secretary was abolished, as well as that of Lord Lieutenant. Executive responsibility within the Irish Free State and Northern Ireland was effectively transferred to the President of the Executive Council (i.e. the prime minister) and the Prime Minister of Northern Ireland respectively. Northern Ireland affairs became the responsibility of the Secretary of State for Dominion Affairs and Home Secretary.

== History of the office ==
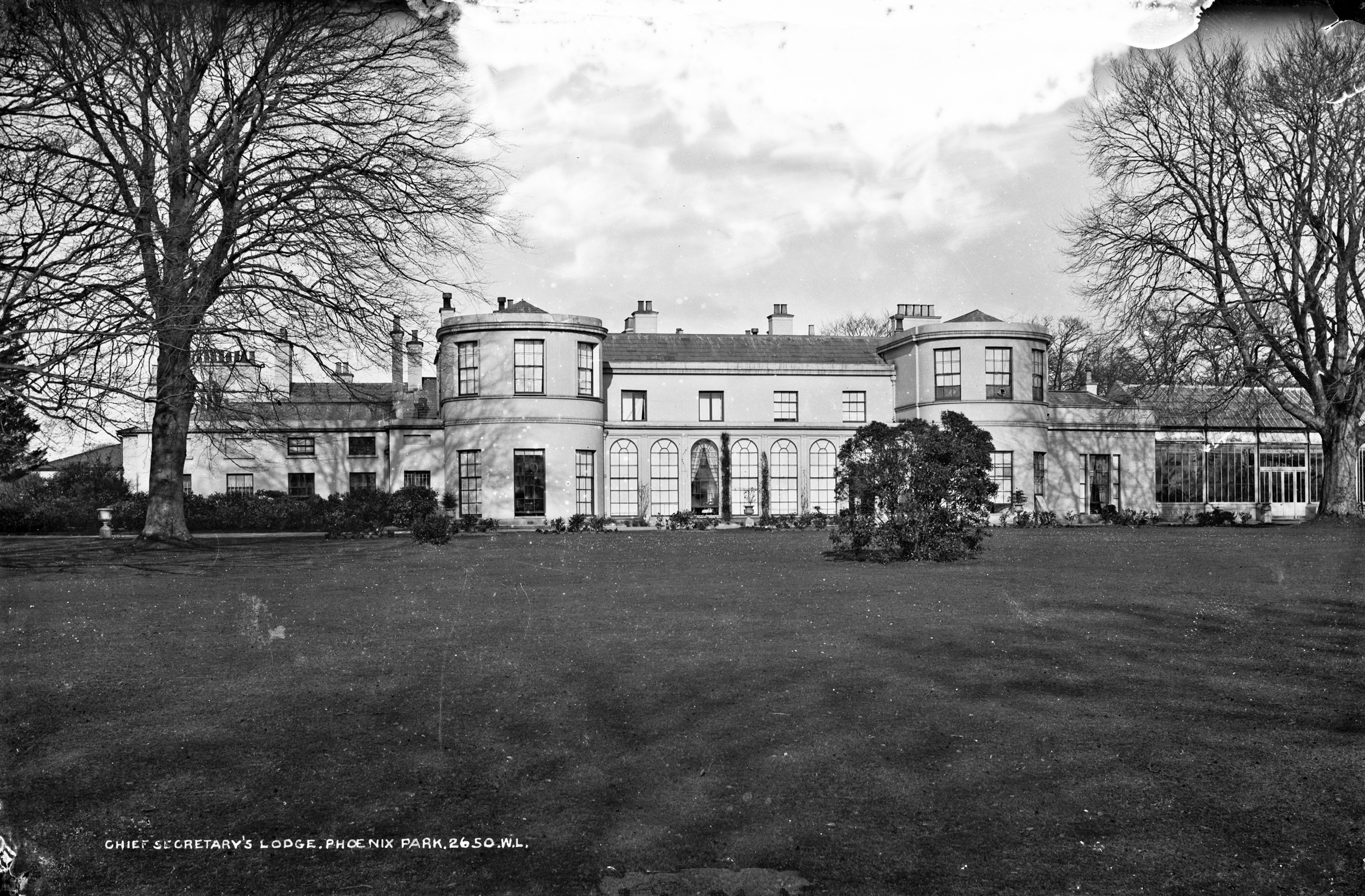
Chief Sectretary's Lodge, Phoenix Park, now the Deerfield Residence of the U.S. Ambassador

The dominant position of the Lord Lieutenant at Dublin Castle had been central to the British administration of the Kingdom of Ireland for much of its history. Poynings' Law in particular meant that the Parliament of Ireland lacked the right of initiative, and the Crown kept control of executive authority in the hands of officials sent from London, rather than ministers responsible to the Irish parliament.

In 1560, Queen Elizabeth I of England and Ireland ordered the Lord Lieutenant, the Earl of Sussex, to appoint John Challoner of Dublin as Secretary of State for Ireland "because at this present there is none appointed to be Clerk of our Council there, and considering how more meet it were, that in our realm there were for our honour one to be our Secretary there for the affairs of our Realm". The appointment of a Secretary was intended to both improve Irish administration, and to keep the Lord Lieutenant in line. The role of Secretary of State for Ireland and Chief Secretary of Ireland were originally distinct positions, Thomas Pelham being the first individual appointed to both offices concurrently in 1796.

Over time, the post of Chief Secretary gradually increased in importance, particularly because of his role as manager of legislative business for the Government in the Irish House of Commons, in which he sat as an MP, making the person a sort of ersatz Prime Minister. While the Irish administration was not responsible to the parliament, it nevertheless needed to manage and influence it in order to pursue certain reforms involving the passage of local legislation.

Chief Secretary Viscount Castlereagh played a key role in the enactment of the Act of Union which passed the Irish Parliament on a second attempt in 1800 — through the exercise of patronage and direct bribery. Upon the Union on 1 January 1801, the Kingdom of Ireland merged into the United Kingdom of Great Britain and Ireland and the Irish parliament ceased to exist. However, the existing system of administration in Ireland continued broadly in place, with the offices of Lord Lieutenant and Chief Secretary retaining their respective roles.

The last Chief Secretary to represent an Irish constituency while in office was Chichester Parkinson-Fortescue, MP for County Louth, who served from 1868 to 1871.

The last Chief Secretary was Sir Hamar Greenwood, who left office in October 1922. The Irish Free State, comprising the greater part of Ireland, would become independent on 6 December 1922. In Northern Ireland, a new Government of Northern Ireland was established, led by a Prime Minister of Northern Ireland. This government operated from 1921 until 1972, and the position of Secretary of State for Northern Ireland was created as a position in the cabinet of the United Kingdom in London. Relations with the Northern Ireland government, treated as a sort of internal quasi-Dominion, was put under the purview Secretary of State for Dominion Affairs; the Northern Ireland Department of the Home Office was responsible for Northern Ireland matters not under the purview of the Belfast authorities.

== List of chief secretaries for Ireland ==
This list includes holders of a key political office in the British administration in Ireland. Nominally subordinate to the Lord Lieutenant, from the late 18th century until the end of British rule he was effectively the government minister with responsibility for governing Ireland; usually it was the Chief Secretary, rather than the Lord Lieutenant, who sat in the British Cabinet. There were two periods during which this was not the case: first, from 29 June 1895 to 8 August 1902, when the Lord Lieutenant Lord Cadogan sat in the Cabinet while Chief Secretary Gerald Balfour (until 9 November 1900) was not a member, and (from 9 November 1900) while Chief Secretary George Wyndham also sat there; and secondly, from 28 October 1918 to 2 April 1921, when both the Lord Lieutenant Lord French and a succession of Chief Secretaries (Edward Shortt, Ian Macpherson and Sir Hamar Greenwood) sat in the Cabinet.

=== Kingdom of Ireland ===
==== 1566–1660 ====
Name	Portrait	Term of office		Served under
Edward Waterhouse		20 January 1566	9 October 1567	Sir Henry Sidney
Edward Waterhouse (second time)		28 October 1568		Sir Henry Sidney
Edmund Tremayne		15 July 1569	31 March 1571	Sir Henry Sidney
Philip Williams		post March 1571	17 September 1575	Sir William Fitzwilliam
Edmund Molyneux		18 September 1575		Sir Henry Sidney
Edmund Spenser		7 September 1580	30 August 1582	The Lord Grey de Wilton
Philip Williams		21 June 1584	10 August 1594	Sir John Perrot; Sir William FitzWilliam
Richard Cooke		11 August 1594	21 May 1597	Sir William Russell
Philip Williams		22 May 1597	13 October 1597	The Lord Burgh
Henry Wotton		15 April 1599	4 September 1599	The Earl of Essex
Francis Mitchell		28 February 1600	March 1600	The Lord Mountjoy
George Cranmer		March 1600	Died 16 July 1600	The Lord Mountjoy
Fynes Moryson		14 November 1600	31 May 1603	The Lord Mountjoy
John Bingley		1 June 1603	2 February 1605	Sir George Carey
Henry Piers		3 February 1605	10 February 1616	Sir Arthur Chichester
Henry Holcroft		30 August 1616	3 May 1622	Sir Oliver St John
Sir John Veele		8 September 1622	25 October 1629	The Viscount Falkland
George Lane		21 January 1644	April 1646	The Marquess of Ormonde
==== 1660–1701 ====
Name	Portrait	Term of office		Served under
Matthew Locke		1660	1660	The Lord Robartes
Sir Thomas Page		1662	1669	The Duke of Ormonde: The Earl of Ossory
Henry Ford		1669	1670	The Lord Robartes
Sir Ellis Leighton		1670	1672	The Lord Berkeley of Stratton
Sir Henry Ford		1672	1673	The Earl of Essex
William Harbord		1673	1676	The Earl of Essex
Sir Cyril Wyche		1677	1682	The Duke of Ormonde
Sir William Ellis		1682	1685	The Duke of Ormonde
Sir Paul Rycaut		1686	1687	The Earl of Clarendon
Thomas Sheridan		1687	1688	The Earl of Tyrconnell
Bishop Patrick Tyrrell		1688	1689	The Earl of Tyrconnell
John Davis		1690	1692	
Sir Cyril Wyche		1692	1693	The Viscount Sydney
Sir Richard Aldworth		1693	1696	The Lord Capell
William Palmer		1696	1697	
Matthew Prior		1697	1699	
Humphrey May		1699	1701	
==== 1701–1750 ====
Name	Portrait	Term of office		Served under
Francis Gwyn		1701	1703	The Earl of Rochester
Edward Southwell Sr.		1703	1707	The Duke of Ormonde
George Dodington		1707	1708	The Earl of Pembroke
Joseph Addison		1708	1710	The Earl of Wharton
Edward Southwell Sr.		1710	1713	The Duke of Ormonde
Sir John Stanley, Bt		1713	1714	The Duke of Shrewsbury
Joseph Addison		1714	1715	The Earl of Sunderland
Martin Bladen and Charles Delafaye		1715	1717	
Edward Webster		1717	1720	The Duke of Bolton
Horatio Walpole		1720	1721	The Duke of Grafton
Edward Hopkins		1721	1724	The Duke of Grafton
Thomas Clutterbuck		1724	1730	The Lord Carteret
Walter Cary (also spelt 'Carey')		1730	1737	The Duke of Dorset
Sir Edward Walpole		1737	1739	The Duke of Devonshire
Thomas Townshend		1739	1739	The Duke of Devonshire
Hon. Henry Bilson Legge		1739	1741	The Duke of Devonshire
Viscount Duncannon		1741	1745	The Duke of Devonshire
Richard Liddell		1745	1746	The Earl of Chesterfield
Sewallis Shirley		1746	1746	The Earl of Chesterfield
Edward Weston		1746	1750	The Earl of Harrington
==== 1750–1801 ====
Name	Portrait	Term of office		Served under
Lord George Sackville (Note: Styled "Lord" as a courtesy.)		1750	1755	The Duke of Dorset
Hon. Henry Seymour Conway		1755	1757	The Duke of Devonshire
Richard Rigby		1757	1761	The Duke of Bedford
William Gerard Hamilton		1761	1764	The Earl of Halifax; The Earl of Northumberland
The Earl of Drogheda		1764	1765	The Earl of Northumberland
Sir Charles Bunbury		1765	1765	The Viscount Weymouth
Viscount Conway		1765	1766	The Earl of Hertford
Hon. Augustus Hervey		1766	1767	The Earl of Bristol
Theophilus Jones		1767	1767	The Earl of Bristol
Lord Frederick Campbell		1767	1768	The Viscount Townshend
Sir George Macartney		1769	1772	The Viscount Townshend
Sir John Blaquiere		1772	1776	The Earl Harcourt
Sir Richard Heron		1776	1780	The Earl of Buckinghamshire
William Eden		1780	1782	The Earl of Carlisle
Hon. Richard FitzPatrick		1782	1782	The Duke of Portland
William Grenville		1782	1783	The Earl Temple
William Windham		1783	1783	The Earl of Northington
Hon. Thomas Pelham		1783	1784	The Earl of Northington
Thomas Orde		1784	1787	The Duke of Rutland
Alleyne FitzHerbert		1787	1789	The Marquess of Buckingham
Hon. Robert Hobart		1789	1793	The Marquess of Buckingham; The Earl of Westmorland
Sylvester Douglas		1793	1794	The Earl of Westmorland
Viscount Milton		1794	1795	The Earl FitzWilliam
Hon. Thomas Pelham		1795	1798	The Earl Camden
Viscount Castlereagh		1798	1801	The Marquess Cornwallis

=== United Kingdom ===
==== 1801–1852 ====
Name	Portrait	Term of office		Political party
Charles Abbot; MP for Helston		1801	1802	Tory
William Wickham; MP for Cashel		1802	1804	Tory
Sir Evan Nepean, Bt; MP for Bridport		1804	1805	Tory
Nicholas Vansittart; MP for Old Sarum		1805	1805	Tory
Charles Long; MP for Wendover		1805	1806	Tory
William Elliot; MP for Peterborough		1806	1807	Whig
Sir Arthur Wellesley; MP for Tralee (1807); MP for Mitchell (1807); MP for Newport (1807–09)		1807	1809	Tory
Robert Dundas; MP for Midlothian		1809	1809	Tory
William Wellesley-Pole; MP for Queen's County		1809	1812	Tory
Robert Peel; MP for Chippenham (1812–17); MP for Oxford University (1817–29)		1812	1818	Tory
Charles Grant; MP for Inverness-shire		1818	1821	Tory
Henry Goulburn; MP for West Looe (1818–26); MP for Armagh City (1826–31)		29 December 1821	29 April 1827	Tory
William Lamb; MP for Bletchingley		29 April 1827	21 June 1828	Whig
Lord Francis Leveson-Gower; MP for Sutherland		21 June 1828	30 July 1830	Tory
Sir Henry Hardinge; MP for St Germans		30 July 1830	15 November 1830	Tory
Edward Smith-Stanley; MP for Windsor (1831–32); MP for North Lancashire (1832–44)		29 November 1830	29 March 1833	Whig
Sir John Hobhouse, Bt; MP for Westminster		29 March 1833	May 1833	Whig
Edward Littleton; MP for South Staffordshire		May 1833	14 November 1834	Whig
Sir Henry Hardinge; MP for Launceston		16 December 1834	8 April 1835	Conservative
Viscount Morpeth; MP for West Riding of Yorkshire		22 April 1835	30 August 1841	Whig
Lord Eliot; MP for East Cornwall (Note: Styled "Lord" as a courtesy until 19 January 1845, when he inherited his father's earldom and thus became disqualified from the House of Commons.)		6 February 1841	1 February 1845	Conservative
Sir Thomas Fremantle, Bt; MP for Buckingham		1 February 1845	14 February 1846	Conservative
The Earl of Lincoln; MP for Falkirk Burghs from 2 May 1846		14 February 1846	June 1846	Conservative
Henry Labouchere; MP for Taunton		6 July 1846	22 July 1847	Whig
Sir William Somerville, Bt; MP for Drogheda		22 July 1847	21 February 1852	Whig
==== 1852–1900 ====
Name	Portrait	Term of office		Political party
Lord Naas; MP for Coleraine		1 March 1852	17 December 1852	Conservative
Sir John Young, Bt; MP for County Cavan		6 January 1853	30 January 1855	Peelite
Edward Horsman; MP for Stroud		1 March 1855	27 May 1857	Whig
Henry Arthur Herbert; MP for County Kerry		27 May 1857	21 February 1858	Whig
Lord Naas; MP for Cockermouth		4 March 1858	11 June 1859	Conservative
Edward Cardwell; MP for Oxford		24 June 1859	29 July 1861	Liberal
Sir Robert Peel, Bt; MP for Tamworth		29 July 1861	7 December 1865	Liberal
Chichester Parkinson-Fortescue; MP for County Louth		7 December 1865	26 June 1866	Liberal
The Earl of Mayo; MP for Cockermouth (Note: Became disqualified as an MP in 1867 when he inherited his father's earldom.)		10 July 1866	29 September 1868	Conservative
John Wilson-Patten; MP for North Lancashire		29 September 1868	1 December 1868	Conservative
Chichester Parkinson-Fortescue; MP for County Louth		16 December 1868	12 January 1871	Liberal
Marquess of Hartington; MP for Radnor		12 January 1871	17 February 1874	Liberal
Sir Michael Hicks-Beach, Bt; MP for East Gloucestershire		27 February 1874	15 February 1878	Conservative
James Lowther; MP for City of York		15 February 1878	21 April 1880	Conservative
William Edward Forster; MP for Bradford		30 April 1880	6 May 1882	Liberal
Lord Frederick Cavendish; MP for West Riding of Yorkshire North		6 May 1882	6 May 1882	Liberal
George Trevelyan; MP for Hawick Burghs		9 May 1882	23 October 1884	Liberal
Henry Campbell-Bannerman; MP for Stirling Burghs		23 October 1884	9 June 1885	Liberal
Sir William Hart Dyke, Bt; MP for Mid Kent		25 June 1885	23 January 1886	Conservative
William Henry Smith; MP for Strand		23 January 1886	28 January 1886	Conservative
John Morley; MP for Newcastle-upon-Tyne		6 February 1886	20 July 1886	Liberal
Sir Michael Hicks Beach, Bt; MP for Bristol West		5 August 1886	7 March 1887	Conservative
Arthur Balfour; MP for Manchester East		7 March 1887	9 November 1891	Conservative
William Jackson; MP for Leeds North		9 November 1891	11 August 1892	Conservative
John Morley; MP for Newcastle-upon-Tyne		22 August 1892	21 June 1895	Liberal
Gerald Balfour; MP for Leeds Central		1895	1900	Conservative
==== 1900–1922 ====
Name	Portrait	Term of office		Political party
George Wyndham; MP for Dover		9 November 1900	12 March 1905	Conservative
Walter Long; MP for Bristol South		12 March 1905	4 December 1905	Conservative
James Bryce; MP for Aberdeen South		10 December 1905	23 January 1907	Liberal
Augustine Birrell; MP for Bristol North		23 January 1907	3 May 1916	Liberal
Henry Duke; MP for Exeter		31 July 1916	5 May 1918	Conservative
Edward Shortt; MP for Newcastle upon Tyne West		5 May 1918	10 January 1919	Liberal
Ian Macpherson; MP for Ross and Cromarty		10 January 1919	2 April 1920	Liberal
Sir Hamar Greenwood, Bt; MP for Sunderland		2 April 1920	19 October 1922	Liberal

== See also ==
- Secretary of State for Northern Ireland, similar position in the British cabinet from 1972.

== Bibliography ==
- British Historical Facts 1760–1830, by Chris Cook and John Stevenson (The Macmillan Press 1980) ISBN 0-333-21512-5 (includes list of Chief Secretaries on page 31)
- British Historical Facts 1830–1900, by Chris Cook and Brendan Keith (The Macmillan Press 1975) ISBN 0-333-13220-3 (includes list of Chief Secretaries on pages 52–53)
- Twentieth-Century British Political Facts 1900–2000, by David Butler and Gareth Butler (Macmillan Press, Eighth edition 2000) ISBN 0-333-77222-9 paperback (includes list of Chief Secretaries on page 61)
