= Edmund Molyneux =

English biographer and politician

Edmund Molyneux (fl. 1587) was a biographer and Secretary to the Lord Lieutenant of Ireland.

== Family ==
He was the third son of Sir Edmund Molyneux, a justice of the Court of Common Pleas by Jane, daughter of John Cheney of Chesham Bois, Buckinghamshire.

== Career ==
Thomas Tanner, citing 'Cabala; mysteries of state, in letters of the great ministers of K. James and K. Charles' ed. 1663, p. 140, identifies him as 'one Moleneux,' who, after being in the employ of Sir William Cecil and 'misusing' him, sought in August 1567 the post of secretary to Sir Henry Norris, the English ambassador to France. An Edmund Molyneux was admitted of Gray's Inn in 1574. Edmund Molyneux became secretary to Sir Henry Sidney, and accompanied him to Ireland, where he acted as clerk of the council. Sidney did his best to advance Molyneux' interests at court. On 20 September 1576, he wrote a long letter in his favour to Burghley, and in November 1576 vainly asked the privy council to appoint Molyneux, along with another, supervisor of the attorneys, who had 'grown very crafty and corrupt'. In September 1578 Molyneux was sent by Sidney to London to report upon the state of Ireland. On 31 December 1579 he petitioned the privy council for his 'despatch and payment after long suit'.

Molyneux furnished an account of Sir Henry, Sir Philip, Sir Robert, and Thomas Sidney to Holinshed's Chronicles (ed. 1587, iii. 1548-56), in which he complained that Sir Henry Sidney, however he might strive, never succeeded in obtaining for him a comfortable office or reward of any kind. The enmity of Burghley probably retarded his advancement.

== Notes ==
Political offices
| Preceded by Philip Williams | Chief Secretary for Ireland; 1575-? | Succeeded by Edmund Spenser |
