= John Waddon (died 1695) =

John Waddon (c. 1649 – 25 August 1695) was an English politician who sat in the House of Commons of England in from 1689 to 1690.

Waddon was the son of Thomas Waddon of Plymouth and his wife Honor Ley, daughter of John Ley or Kempthorne of Tonacombe and was baptised on 18 January 1649. His grandfather John Waddon was MP for Plymouth during the English Civil War. He was at Exeter College, Oxford. He was Vice-Warden of the Stannaries and Deputy Lieutenant for Cornwall and governor of Pendennis Castle. Waddon lived at Moditonham House where in 1689 John Granville, 1st Earl of Bath held a meeting with the representatives of the Prince of Orange concerning the surrender of Pendennis and Plymouth Castles.

In January 1689, Waddon was elected Member of Parliament for Saltash and held the seat until March 1690.

Waddon married Mary Herle daughter of Edward Herle of Prideaux Castle. They had no children.

Parliament of England
Preceded by Cyril Wyche; Edmund Waller	Member of Parliament for Saltash; 1689–1680; With: Bernard Granville	Succeeded by Sir John Carew, 3rd Baronet; Richard Carew
