= Hockwold cum Wilton =

Village in Norfolk, England

Coordinates: 52.465°N 0.542°E

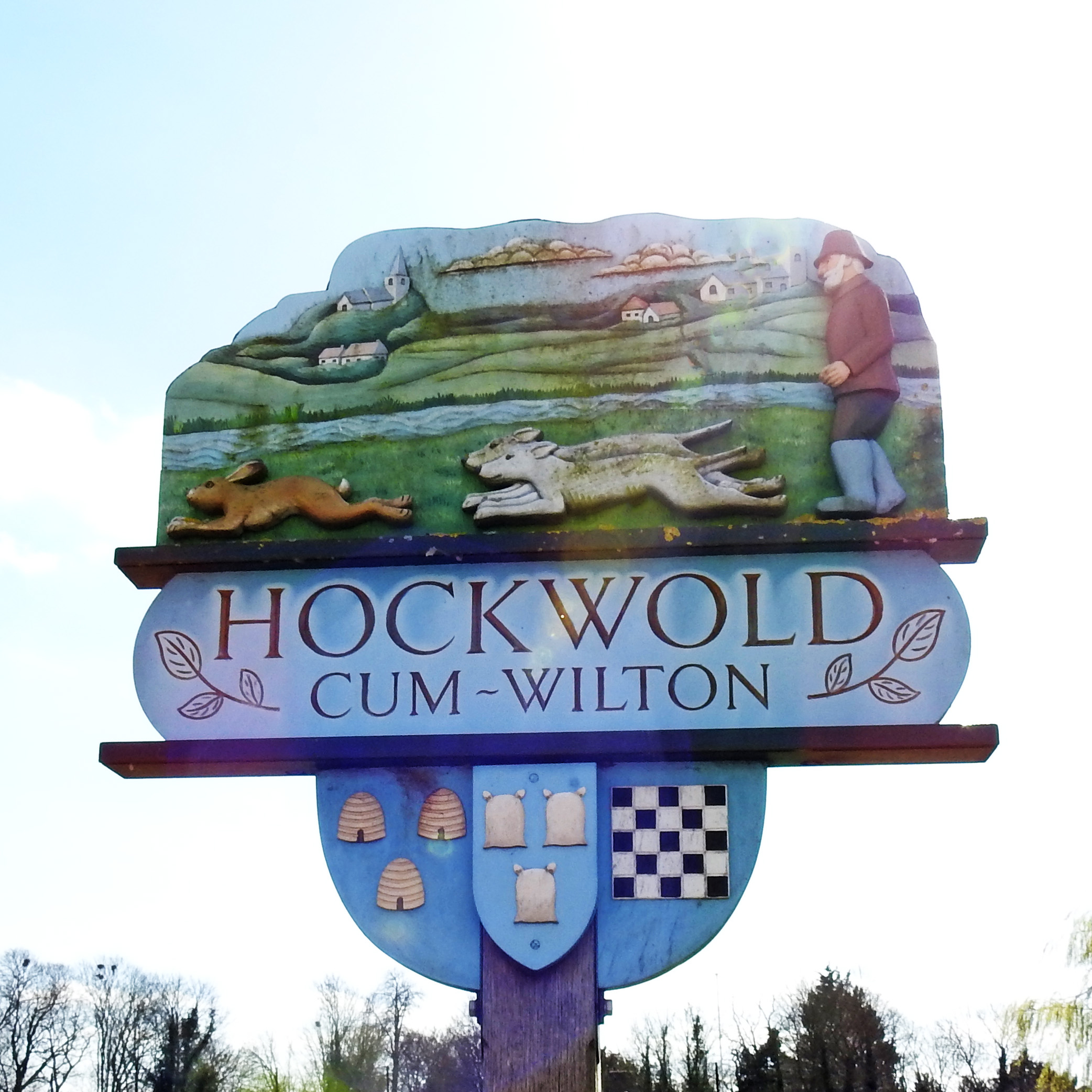
- Hockwold cum Wilton Village Sign

- Location within Norfolk
- Area: 11.99 sq mi (31.1 km^{2})
- Population: 1,304 (2021 census)
  - Density: 109/sq mi (42/km^{2})
- OS grid reference: TF615205
- District: King's Lynn and West Norfolk
- Shire county: Norfolk
- Region: East
- Country: England
- Sovereign state: United Kingdom
- Post town: THETFORD
- Postcode district: IP26
- Dialling code: 01842
- UK Parliament: South West Norfolk

Hockwold cum Wilton is a civil parish and village in the English county of Norfolk.

Hockwold is located 10 miles (16 km) west of Thetford and 34 miles (55 km) south-west of Norwich.

== Etymology ==
Hockwold cum Wilton's name is of Anglo-Saxon origin and derives from the Old English for the hock forest and willow-tree farmstead.

== History ==
Several Roman buildings have been found in Hockwold cum Wilton including a former temple in Sawbench Woods. In 1962, a hoard of silver cups were found in the parish which are currently held by the British Museum. Among local discoveries is a cultic site active from the mid-2nd to late 4th century AD. It consists of a circular building with a chalk floor, plastered and painted walls, and a thatched roof. It likely functioned as a favissa, where votive objects, including coins and regalia such as crowns and diadems, were deposited.

In the Domesday Book of 1086, Hockwold cum Wilton is recorded as a settlement of 12 households in the hundred of Grimshoe. In 1086, the village was part of the East Anglian estates of William de Warenne.

The only pilgrim badge of Saint Andrew to be found outside of Scotland and London was found in the parish in the 1980s.

== Geography ==
According to the 2021 census, Hockwold cum Wilton has a population of 1,304 people which shows an increase from the 1,195 people listed in the 2011 census.

== St. James' Church ==
Hockwold cum Wilton's parish church is dedicated to Saint James the Great and dates from the Fourteenth Century. St. James' is located on Church Lane and has been Grade I listed since 1959. The church holds intermittent Sunday service.

== St. Peter's Church ==
There is another derelict church dedicated to Saint Peter in Hockwold cum Wilton which dates from the Fourteenth Century. St. Peter's is located on Station Road and has been Grade I listed since 1959. The church is no longer open for Sunday service and is in the care of the Churches Conservation Trust.

The church features several stained-glass windows designed by Clayton and Bell depicting the Crucifixion, the Resurrection and the Ascension.

== Hockwold Hall ==
Hockwold Hall is an Elizabethan house on the site of an earlier manor. The manor of Hockwold is mentioned in the Domesday Book of 1086. Hockwold Hall, with origins in the late 15th century, is a Tudor manor house with a substantial extension built by a Royal Prince at the end of the 19th century.

Sir John Tyndale (Tyndall), Baron Tyndale of Thetford, Governor of The Tower of London, KB (1475–1539) was born at Hockwold Cum Wilton Manor as was his son Sir Thomas Tyndale (Tyndall) 1505–1583, who also died there. Sir John's brother, William Tyndale (Tyndall) (1484–1536), a 16th-century scholar and linguist died a martyr for translating the scriptures from Greek and Hebrew into vernacular English so that commoners could read the Bible for themselves, rather than having to depend on the church hierarchy to interpret the official Latin Vulgate. The Tyndale Bible was the basis for the King James Bible and it survived book burners, but he did not survive. Tyndale was tied to a stake, strangled with a rope and torched outside a castle near Brussels on October 6, 1536.

The royalist Arthur Heveningham lived at the Hall until 1657. His brother, William Heveningham, was one of the regicides of Charles I, and his daughter Abigail married John Digby, 1st Earl of Bristol. Sir Cyril Wyche, a founder member of the Royal Society, took over the estate in 1688 and lived there until 1707. Prince Victor Duleep Singh, the eldest son of the last Maharaja of Lahore, a godson of Queen Victoria, came to live at Hockwold Hall in 1895.

The gates to the hall are reputedly haunted by a white lady who supposedly unnerves drivers.

== Governance ==
Hockwold cum Wilton is part of the electoral ward of Feltwell for local elections and is part of the district of King's Lynn and West Norfolk.

The village's national constituency is South West Norfolk which has been represented by Labour's Terry Jermy MP since 2024.

== Notable people ==
- Edward Palmer (1829–1911), botanist and archaeologist

== War Memorial ==
Hockwold cum Wilton War Memorial is an obelisk memorial in St. James' Churchyard. The Second World War part of the memorial was unveiled in 1947 by Brig-Gen. Henri de Lotbiniere and the Reverend N.R.M. Hawthorn. The memorial lists the following names for the First World War:

Rank	Name	Unit	Date of death	Burial/Commemoration
LCpl.	George Stokes	5th Bn., Dorsetshire Regiment	6 Oct. 1917	Dozinghem Cemetery
AS	Charles A. Rayner	HMS Hawke (Cruiser)	15 Oct. 1914	Chatham Naval Memorial
Gnr.	Percy Jacob	14th Bde., Royal Horse Artillery	24 Aug. 1918	Saint-Amand Cemetery
Pte.	Albert W. Harrison	4th Bn., Bedfordshire Regiment	27 Aug. 1918	Vis-en-Artois Memorial
Pte.	Charles E. Trudgill	2nd Bn., Border Regiment	19 Apr. 1916	Thiepval Memorial
Pte.	J. William Cooper	8th Bn., East Surrey Regiment	28 Oct. 1918	Roisel Cemetery
Pte.	Alfred A. Hicks	1st Bn., Essex Regiment	13 Aug. 1915	Helles Memorial
Pte.	George W. Harrod	10th Bn., Essex Regt.	22 Oct. 1918	Le Cateau Cemetery
Pte.	Frank Arnold	1st Bn., Norfolk Regiment	19 May 1916	Faubourg Cemetery
Pte.	Frank S. Arnold	1st Bn., Norfolk Regt.	15 Jan. 1916	Carnoy Military Cemetery
Pte.	Herbert Fincham	1st Bn., Norfolk Regt.	4 Jun. 1916	Arras Memorial
Pte.	Elijah Johnson	1st Bn., Norfolk Regt.	1 May 1915	Boulogne Eastern Cem.
Pte.	Walter Arnold	2nd Bn., Norfolk Regt.	26 Mar. 1916	Basra Memorial
Pte.	Victor J. T. Malling	2nd Bn., Norfolk Regt.	2 May 1916	Basra War Cemetery
Pte.	Kent Palmer	7th Bn., Norfolk Regt.	1 Oct. 1915	Loos Memorial
Pte.	Reginald Arnold	8th Bn., Norfolk Regt.	19 Jul. 1916	Thiepval Memorial
Pte.	Frank Green	8th Bn., Norfolk Regt.	10 Nov. 1917	Harelbeke Cemetery
Pte.	Robert Burgg	9th Bn., Norfolk Regt.	26 Sep. 1915	Loos Memorial
Pte.	Reginald Mayes	9th Bn., Norfolk Regt.	15 Sep. 1916	Guillemont Road Cem.
Pte.	Zachariah Harrison	2nd Bn., Suffolk Regiment	28 Mar. 1918	Arras Memorial
Pte.	Arthur R. Carpenter	11th Bn., Suffolk Regt.	1 Jul. 1916	Thiepval Memorial
Pte.	George Kemp	15th Bn., West Yorkshire Regiment	15 May 1918	Bergen Cemetery

The following names were added after the Second World War:

Rank	Name	Unit	Date of death	Burial/Commemoration
FO	Jack W. Walters DFC	No. 7 Squadron RAF (Lancaster)	20 May 1944	Runnymede Memorial
LCpl.	Frederick W. Green	1 Coy., Corps of Military Police	5 Sep. 1944	Gradara War Cemetery
Pte.	John E. Jarred	5th Bn., Royal Norfolk Regiment	7 Nov. 1943	Kanchanaburi War Cemetery
