= John Vincent Lentaigne =

Irish surgeon

Sir John Vincent Lentaigne
- Born: 19 July 1855; Dublin, Ireland
- Died: 13 January 1875

Sir John Vincent Lentaigne (1855 – 30 March 1915) was an Irish surgeon and president of the Royal College of Surgeons in Ireland between 1908 and 1910.

== Life ==
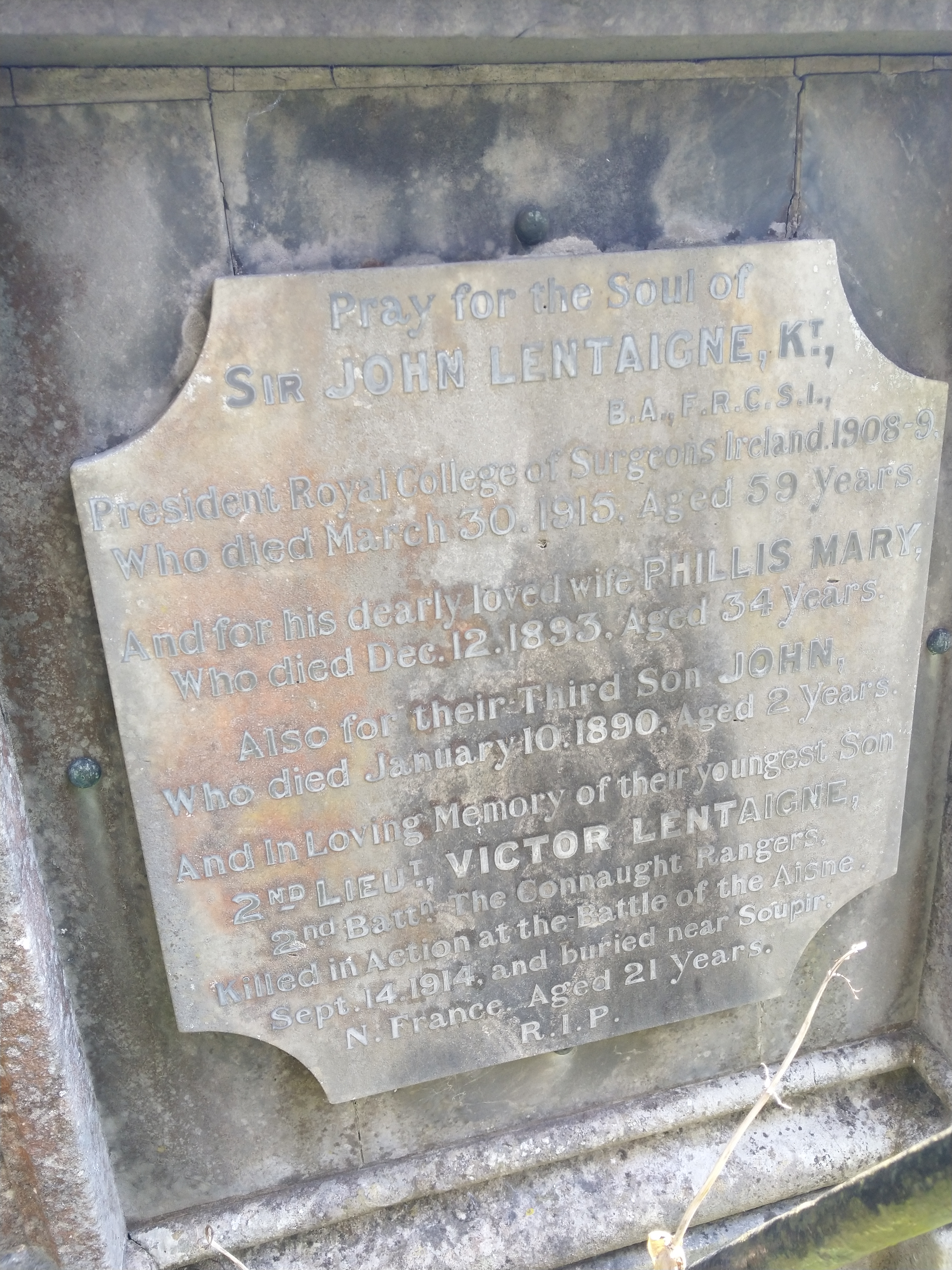
Grave of Lentaigne in Drumcondra

John Vincent Lentaigne was born on 19 July 1855 in Dublin. His parents were Mary (née Magan) and John Francis O'Neill Lentaigne. He had 6 brothers and 4 sisters. Lentaigne was educated at Clongowes Wood College, and at Vannes, Brittany. He later entered the Catholic University of Ireland, and Trinity College Dublin in 1880, and the RCSI. He was appointed resident surgeon at the Richmond Hospital in 1882, later moving to the Mater Misericordiae Hospital in 1886. He was elected fellow of the RCSI in 1886, and served as vice -president in 1906, and president in 1908 to 1909. In 1911 he was appointed surgeon general to the household of the lord lieutenant of Ireland. He was knighted in 1910.

He married Phyllis Mary Coffey in February 1882, and they had 2 daughters and 3 sons. Lentaigne died at his home in Dublin on 30 March 1915.
