= Benjamin Lentaigne =

Benjamin Lentaigne was born in France in 1773, but, as a Royalist and firm supporter of King Louis XVI, was forced to escape to England at the age of nineteen.

== Biography ==
He went on to earn a medical qualification in England and join the British Army, being appointed to the 5th Dragoon Guards. He was posted to the Dublin barracks in 1795, and was involved in the treatment of Wolfe Tone, the leader of the 1798 Irish Rebellion, during his imprisonment and the final days of life. Lentaigne treated Tone just hours before he was due to be hanged and a pamphlet published in Latin by the doctor some years after Tone's official "suicide" refers to an unusual neck wound suffered by an unnamed patient which indicated that "a bullet passed through his throat". This has led to speculation that Tone may have been shot.

His son was John Lentaigne. He died in 1847.
