= Terence George Ward =

British Surgeon

Sir Terence George Ward (16 January 1906 – 30 September 1991) was an oral and maxillofacial surgeon who played a substantial role in establishing Oral and Maxillofacial Surgery as an autonomous specialty within the United Kingdom and internationally.

Early in his career as an RAF dental surgeon, he treated facial injuries sustained by aircrew and became acquainted with and inspired by dental surgeon Sir William Kelsey Fry and plastic surgeon Sir Archibald McIndoe who were both involved with World War II facial injuries. Ward later led the Maxillofacial Unit at the Queen Victoria Hospital in East Grinstead from 1945 to 1981, contributing to its reputation as a centre of clinical excellence. He was significantly involved in the formation of the British Association of Oral Surgeons and International Association of Oral and Maxillofacial Surgeons.

== Early life, education and training ==
Terence George Ward was born in Dartmouth, Devon, on 16 January 1906, the son of a schoolteacher. Shortly after his birth, his family relocated to Edinburgh, where he attended the Royal High School. Due to limited financial means, Ward initially entered dentistry through an apprenticeship as a dental mechanic. At the time, completing an apprenticeship in what was then called dental mechanics could grant an exemption from the practical technical laboratory components of the university dental curriculum. This shortened the university course.

Ward subsequently matriculated at the University of Edinburgh, pursuing dual qualifications in medicine and dentistry. He qualified as a dental surgeon (LDS) and received his medical licentiate (LRCP, LRCS Edinburgh) in 1928. Thereafter he gained another medical diploma from the Royal College of Physicians and Surgeons of Glasgow (LRFPS) in 1930.

== Career ==
=== Dental practice ===
In October 1931, he married a fellow dental student Elizabeth (Betty) Wilson and they moved to Hastings, where Ward spent the next nine years in general dental practice. In Hastings he developed an interest in surgery and undertook sessions at the local hospital where he treated patients referred by other practitioners. His dual qualification in both medicine and dentistry was probably a factor in encouraging these local referrals for more complex cases. This interest was the foundation for his later specialisation in Oral and Maxillofacial Surgery during World War II.

During their years in Hastings, Ward and his wife had two children, a daughter and a son.

=== Royal Air Force ===
Ward joined the dental branch of the Royal Air Force, as a Pilot Officer, in 1940 and was initially based in Hastings. Having established a reputation for expertise in oral surgery, he was regarded as a specialist dental officer. He was promoted to Flying Officer in 1941 and later to Squadron Leader when he was moved to RAF Cosford in Shropshire to work in the maxillofacial unit. Here he met with Archibald McIndoe, a plastic surgeon who was based at East Grinstead treating burned airmen.

Also, while in the RAF, Ward came under the influence of William Kelsey Fry, a civilian advisor to the RAF who was impressed by Ward. Kelsey Fry had worked with Harold Gillies on facial injuries at the Cambridge Military and Sidcup hospitals in WWI and was working with McIndoe at East Grinstead. Later Kelsey Fry and Ward were to co-author The Dental Treatment of Maxillo-facial Injuries which was published in 1956. Ward was demobilised in 1945 and awarded an MBE (Mil) in recognition of his contribution to the war wounded.

After his formal service ended, Ward retained strong links with all three armed services. He served as a consultant Oral Surgeon to the RAF and the Royal Navy, and as an emeritus surgeon to the Army, actively supporting the training of military surgeons well into his retirement.

=== East Grinstead ===
Kelsey Fry ensured Ward was appointed as a consultant at the Queen Victoria Hospital in East Grinstead when Kelsey Fry returned to work at Guy's Hospital. When the National Health Service was established in 1948, Ward's position was formalised as a Consultant Oral Surgeon. Under his leadership, the unit at East Grinstead evolved into a centre of clinical excellence for the specialty.

He was an innovative operator who designed many of his own surgical instruments, such as a double-ended third molar flap retractor and a periosteal elevator, some of which remained in use for decades. He achieved a reputation as a teacher, and his unit became a destination for aspiring young surgeons from across the UK and overseas, particularly from Australia and New Zealand.

He helped facilitate a teratology research unit at Downe in Kent and used East Grinstead as a base for professional development, hosting the first scientific meeting of the British Association of Oral Surgeons there in 1962.

=== British Association of Oral Surgeons ===
Ward was one of the drivers behind the creation of the British Association of Oral Surgeons (BAOS), now the British Association of Oral and Maxillofacial Surgeons (BAOMS).

Ward and his colleagues founded BAOS in 1962 because they were dissatisfied with being treated as second-class citizens within the British Association of Plastic Surgeons, where they held only associate membership without full voting rights. The BAOS gave the specialty its own autonomous voice and corporate pride.

Ward was elected the association's first President in 1962. He hosted the first scientific meeting of the association at the Queen Victoria Hospital in East Grinstead in October of that year.

Under his leadership and influence, the BAOS was placed on an equal footing with other specialty societies within the Royal College of Surgeons in London. He used his influence and political acumen to advance the status of the specialty both nationally and internationally.

In the same year that the BAOS was founded, Ward was instrumental in establishing the International Association of Oral and Maxillofacial Surgeons and served as its first Secretary-General and later its president.

=== Nigeria ===
The Nigerian Civil War secondment programme was a major initiative initiated by Ward to treat the vast number of facial injuries resulting from the conflict between the Nigerian government and the Republic of Biafra [1,5,7].

The programme began in 1968 after Ruben Shamia, a former East Grinstead house surgeon, who was working for the Colonial Dental Service in Nigeria, became overwhelmed by war casualties and turned to Ward for assistance. After a brief exploratory visit to Nigeria, Ward recommended providing support and sent his senior registrar, Michael Awty, to set up a maxillofacial unit in Kaduna. Awty worked with the Nigerian Army and an RAF dental team to establish a 70-bed facility.

Later upon returning to England, Awty persuaded the Overseas Development Department (now Administration) to formalise a secondment scheme. The programme sent senior registrars from the Queen Victoria Hospital in East Grinstead to Kaduna for six-month attachments. To ensure trainees were sufficiently grounded, they were only allowed to go once they had completed a full year of senior training in the UK. While primarily an East Grinstead rotation, the programme eventually included surgeons from other units.

The team's efforts were highly regarded, and the dental team was subsequently awarded the prestigious Wilkinson Sword of Honour for their service.

== Character and presence ==
Ward was known as a determined and sometimes difficult taskmaster who demanded high commitment and inspired loyalty and teamwork among his ‘acolytes’. Many senior registrars who trained under him at East Grinstead went on to become prominent consultants in the field. He was a colourful and persuasive figure who had a formidable presence; he was dedicated and worked long hours.

But he was also a "private person" who rarely opened-up about his family or personal feelings. He could be formidable but also generous with those he felt deserved it, often helping juniors in ways that were never made public. He was indifferent to all social barriers treating kings and local patients with the same care.

While many revered him, some junior colleagues held less favourable views. Sir Paul Bramley declined a training job with him because he estimated Ward to be a pirate and noted that Ward's lectures sometimes featured material he had never actually touched himself. His operating technique he described as ‘cut first, think later, if at all’. He regarded the department at East Grinstead as his fiefdom; he had bullying tendencies and he was susceptible to flattery. Another recalled him as being blunt and rude at times.

== Honours, awards and offices ==
Throughout his career, Ward received honours and held leadership positions within national and international surgical bodies:

- Appointed a Member of the Order of the British Empire (MBE, Mil) for his service in the Royal Air Force.
- Became a Founding Fellow of the Faculty of Dental Surgery, Royal College of Surgeons of England.
- Appointed a Commander of the Order of the British Empire (CBE).
- 1965–1968**: Served as Dean of the Faculty of Dental Surgery, Royal College of Surgeons of England.
- 1971 Made a Knight Bachelor.
- Served as a Council Member for both the Royal College of Surgeons of England and the Royal College of Surgeons in Ireland.
- Delivered the Charles Tomes Lecture (1961) and the McIndoe Lecture (1974) at the Royal College of Surgeons of England.
- Ward was one of the early recipients of the Down Surgical Prize from the BAOS. This was, and remains, the highest honour awarded by the association for those who have made a 'major contribution to oral and maxillofacial surgery in its widest sense'.

== Retirement and death ==
Ward retired from clinical practice in 1981. He died at the age of 85 on 30 September 1991 in Bexhill-on-Sea. He was survived by his second wife, Sheila, and a son and daughter from his first marriage.

Following his death, there were several professional memorials to honour his legacy. The eleventh International Conference on Oral and Maxillofacial Surgery, held in Buenos Aires, was dedicated to Ward and the other two founders of the international association.

Professional journals published formal appreciations and obituaries detailing his life and contributions, in particular the British Journal of Oral and Maxillofacial Surgery.

== Selected publications ==
- Moore, F.T.; Ward, T.G. (1949) Complications and sequelae of untreated fractures of the facial bones and their treatment. British Journal of Plastic Surgery. 1949 Jan;1(4):257-67.
- Ward, T.G. (1956) The split bone technique for removal of lower third molars. British Dental Journal Vol. 101, pp. 297–304
- Kelsey Fry, W; Ward, T.G (1956) The Dental Treatment of Maxillo-facial Injuries. Blackwell Scientific Publications.
- Ward, T.G. (1961) Surgery of the mandibular Joint. Annals of the Royal College of Surgeons of England Mar;28(3):139-52.
- Ward, T.G.; Cohen, B. (1963) Squamous Carcinoma in a Mandibular Cyst. British Journal of Oral Surgery. Jul;1:8-12.
- Ward, T.G. (1967) The dental profession and cancer of the mouth and jaws. Annals of the Royal College of Surgeons of England. 1967 Summer;41(Suppl):128-31.
- Ward, T.G. (1975) The maxillofacial unit. Annals of the Royal College of Surgeons of England. Aug;57(2):67-73.
- Ward, T.G. (1980) A Century of Achievement in Oral Surgery. British Dental Journal. 1;149(1):25-7.
- Ward, T.G. (1989) Asymptomatic expansion of the mandible. Journal of the American Dental Association. Jul;119(1):169-70.
