= Loneliest Tommies =

British soldiers with facial disfigurements from World War I

The "loneliest Tommies" were British soldiers who suffered catastrophic facial disfigurements during World War I. Named after the common British soldier slang "Tommy", these veterans faced profound social isolation. When venturing out in public, they sat on bright blue benches so civilians could avoid looking at them.

In 1915, Harold Gillies, a New Zealand born surgeon working in England, established a special ward for facial wounds at the Cambridge Military Hospital in Aldershot. In 1916 Gillies had established The Queen’s Hospital at Frognal House for facial reconstruction.
