= Norman Lester Rowe =

British oral and maxillofacial surgeon (1915–1991)

Norman Lester Rowe CBE
- Born: 15 December 1915; Stroud
- Died: 1991 (aged 75–76)
- Education: Malvern College; Guy's Hospital
- Occupations: Oral and maxillofacial Surgeon
- Years active: 1948 - 1980
- Known for: Maxillofacial surgery; President of the British Association of Oral Surgeons; President of the European Association for Maxillofacial Surgery
- Medical career
- Institutions: Rooksdown House, Park Prewitt Hospital, Basingstoke.; Queen Mary's Hospital, Roehampton; Westminster Hospital.; Eastman Dental Hospitals.
- Sub-specialties: Surgery of facial fractures and deformity
- Notable works: Fractures of the Facial (1955)

Norman Rowe (15 December 1915 – 4 August 1991), was a British oral and maxillofacial surgeon who was a defining influence in the development of oral and maxillofacial surgery in the United Kingdom.

He became a consultant first at the WWII Emergency Medical Service Hospital at Rooksdown House, Park Prewitt, Basingstoke in 1948 and later at Queen Mary's Hospital, Roehampton, from 1959 to 1980. He was also a consultant at the Westminster Hospital and the Eastman Dental Hospitals and was one of the original founders of the British Association of Oral and Maxillofacial Surgeons. He helped to establish oral and maxillofacial surgeons as leaders in the treatment of facial injuries by publishing Fractures of the Facial Skeleton in 1955 with his colleague and friend Homer Killey and inspired and trained generations of budding surgeons at his department at Roehampton as well as lecturing worldwide.

== Early life and education ==
Norman Rowe was born in 1915 in Stroud, Gloucestershire, to Arthur William Rowe and Lucy Adams. He was educated at Malvern College but left school prematurely in 1932 but managed to gain admission to Guy's Hospital Dental School from where he qualified as a dental surgeon in 1937.

== Career ==
After qualification he worked in dental practice and between 1941and 1946, during the Second World War as a captain in the Royal Army Dental Corps, gained experience with the 86th General Hospital in Normandy and the Baltic. After the war he returned to Guy's Hospital as a medical student and subsequently gained a medical degree. Specialist training followed at Hill End Hospital, a psychiatric hospital near St Albans which was used as an Emergency Medical Services hospital in WWII for plastic surgery and jaw injuries. There he worked under the direction of dental surgeon Ben Fickling and plastic surgeon Rainsford Mowlem.

In 1948 Rowe was appointed as a consultant at Rooksdown House, Park Prewitt Hospital, in Basingstoke, another psychiatric hospital used as an Emergency Medical Services WWII hospital. There he worked with plastic surgeon Harold Gillies who continued to operate after his official retirement. Initially Rowe only assisted Gillies operate on patients with facial deformity but he often planned the surgery in some great detail and eventually took on doing this type of surgery.

Soon after his appointment Rowe was joined by his friend Homer Killey as a consultant. Together they produced Fractures of the Facial Skeleton, a textbook that became the defining text on the management of facial injuries and remained so for many years. It was first published in 1955 with a second edition in 1968. Later he co-authored Maxillofacial Injuries with his former trainee John Williams which was broader in scope and detail and was published in 1985.

Following his appointment as a consultant, Rowe established an oral surgery service throughout the South West Thames Metropolitan Regional Hospital Authority travelling on his Francis Barnett motorbike to Croydon, Epsom, Dorking, Chertsey, Aldershot, Haslemere, Woking and as far away as Chichester.

In 1959 the plastic and oral surgery service closed at Rooksdown House, Park Prewitt Hospital and the department moved to Queen Mary's Hospital, Roehampton. From 1960 to his retirement in 1980 he also worked at the Westminster Hospital with some additional work at the Eastman Dental Hospital.

Norman Rowe became a popular teacher to his own trainees at Roehampton and the Westminster to whom he was affectionately known as ‘Uncle’. He also travelled widely abroad teaching and lecturing. His Wednesday teaching clinics were attended by visited surgeons from all over the world who he had met on his travels and who he had extended invitations to should they visit England.

At Roehampton Rowe was a pioneer in the treatment of facial deformity using multi-stage operations planned on models with the assistance of Brian Conroy his chief maxillofacial technician. He was also innovative in the development of the treatment of facial injuries, particularly around the eye using models constructed by Conroy and developing new surgical instruments.

In addition to his clinical and training work Rowe took on several administrative roles within oral and maxillofacial surgery. He was one of the founding fathers of the British Association of Oral and Maxillofacial Surgeons (then called the British Association of Oral Surgeons). He chaired the steering committee for its formation and was the first Secretary from 1962 – 1966 and its president in 1969. He sat on the council of the International Association of Oral and Maxillofacial Surgeons (then called the International Association of Oral Surgeons) and became the Secretary General. He sat on the Council and became Vice President of the European Association for Cranio Maxillofacial Surgery (then called the European Association for Maxillo-Facial Surgery) 1974–1976. He was a member of the Board of the Faculty of Dental Surgery of the Royal College of Surgeons of England 1956-1974 and Vice Dean 1968. He was Webb-Johnson lecturer at the Royal College of Surgeons in 1970 and an examiner for the final exam for the Fellowship in Dental Surgery from 1965 – 1971 and 1973–1967. He was a civilian Consultant to the Royal Navy 1955-80 and to the Army 1969 – 1980.

== Awards and honours ==
Rowe was awarded honorary fellowships by the Royal Colleges of Surgeons and was made Commander of The Most Excellent Order of the British Empire in 1976.

== Death ==
He died in 1991.

== Selected publications ==
=== Books ===
- Fractures of the Facial Skeleton 1969 NL Rowe HC Killey 1955 2nd Edition 1969
- Maxillofacial Injuries by N.L. Rowe and J.Ll. Williams 1985. A second edition was published after his death in 1994.

=== Articles ===
- Rowe, N. L. (1985). "Maxillofacial injuries - current trends and techniques". Injury. 16 (8): 513–525. doi:10.1016/0020-1383(85)90076-2. PMID 4066010.
- "Direct skeletal fixation". Transactions International Conference Oral Surgery: 287–291. 1967.
- Rowe, N. L. (1968). "Fractures of the facial skeleton in children". Journal of Oral Surgery. 26 (8): 505–515. PMID 5243132.
- Rowe, N. L. (1972). "Surgery of the temporomandibular joint". Proceedings of the Royal Society of Medicine. 65 (4): 383–388. doi:10.1177/003591577206500438. PMC 1644207. PMID 5024527.
- GILLIES H; ROWE NL (1954). "Osteotomy of the maxilla with special reference to total harelip". Revue Stomatol. 55 (8–9): 545–552. PMID 15444651.
