= Thomas Kilner =

English plastic surgeon

Thomas Pomfret Kilner was an early plastic surgeon. One of the four who continued to practice in Britain between the world wars after training at the Queen's Hospital, Sidcup with Harold Gillies. Kilner continued to practice until 1957 The others were Harold Gillies, Arthur Rainsford Mowlem, and Archibald McIndoe. He took a special interest in repairing cleft lips and palate and was appointed in 1944 as Nuffield Professor of Plastic Surgery at the University of Oxford. He occupied this chair until 1957 when he retired.

Born, educated and trained in Manchester Kilner saw active service in the R.A.M.C. during the First World War. In 1918 he was stationed at Sidcup alongside Sir Harold Gillies. In 1921 they became the only two surgeons specializing in plastic surgery in Britain until joined later by Archibald McIndoe and Rainsford Mowlem. Kilner later became consulting plastic surgeon to a large number of hospitals. He served in the Second World War as a consulting plastic surgeon and worked at Roehampton which developed into Stoke Mandeville Hospital . Kilner was President of the British Association of Plastic Surgery in 1948 and 1955. .

== Early life ==
Kilner was born on 17 September 1890, the son of a schoolmaster at Manchester Grammar School. He attended Queen Elizabeth's Grammar School, Blackburn. He studied medicine at Manchester University. Here he won the Dauntesey Scholarship and the Sidney Renshaw Exhibition, as well as medals in anatomy and physiology. He qualified in 1912, with distinctions in surgery and pathology.

== Career ==
Following graduation in 1912, he demonstrated in anatomy and then became a house surgeon. His intended to join Dr Bateman of Blackburn in general practice, but when the First World War intervened he was enlisted in the R.A.M.C.

He rose to the rank of captain, and by 1918 was following general surgery as a career. At the armistice he was in charge of an orthopedic unit for patients with fractured femurs. His was advised he might gain an appointment with Major Harold Gillies in a new hospital unit where a new of specialty, "Plastic Surgery." was being practiced. Though not knowing what this was, Kilner was appointed to the hospital at Sidcup.

== Personal life ==
In 1915 Kilner had married Olive Brown. Their son, Hugh, was born in date. Olive Kilner died when Hugh was an infant of an acute abdominal catastrophe. Hugh qualified in medicine at St Thomas's Hospital but died during service with the Medical Branch of the Royal Air Force. In 1926 Kilner married Florence Brennan (née O'Neill), who survived him. They had one daughter together and brought up Hugh (young "Pomf") together along with their other boys, Peter and Michael, both of whom survived their father.

== Death ==
He died in 1964 having seen the profession go from 1939 when only three London teaching hospitals had appointed consultant surgeons to there being hardly a teaching hospital in the British Isles without a plastic surgeon on the permanent staff on his death.

== Selected publications ==
- Shiell RC, Kossard S (May 1990). "Problems associated with synthetic fibre implants for hair replacement ("NIDO" process)". The Medical Journal of Australia. 152 (10): 560. doi:10.5694/j.1326-5377.1990.tb125379.x. PMC 2338937. PMID 2338937.
- Olsen HS, Cochrane AW, Dillon PJ, Nalin CM, Rosen CA (August 1990). "Interaction of the human immunodeficiency virus type 1 Rev protein with a structured region in env mRNA is dependent on multimer formation mediated through a basic stretch of amino acids". Genes & Development. 4 (8): 1357–64. doi:10.1101/gad.4.8.1357. PMC 2227413. PMID 2227413.
- Tarazov PG, Ryzhkov VK, Markochev AB, Noskov AA (30 June 1928). "[Palliative treatment of angiosarcoma of the liver using roentgeno-endovascular occlusion of the hepatic artery]". Voprosy Onkologii. 34 (6): 744–6. PMC 2455945. PMID 2455945.
- Kilner TP (November 1931). "Some Selected Cases of Reconstructive Surgery in the Orbital Region". Proceedings of the Royal Society of Medicine. 25 (1): 58–70. doi:10.1177/003591573102500138. PMC 2183514. PMID 19988401.
- Gillies H, Kilner T (1932). "Hare-Lip: Operations for the Correction of Secondary Deformities". The Lancet. 220 (5704): 1369–1375. doi:10.1016/s0140-6736(01)28181-1.
- Kilner TP (May 1934). "The Thiersch Graft. Its Preparation and Uses". Postgraduate Medical Journal. 10 (103): 176–81. doi:10.1136/pgmj.10.103.176. PMC 2532410. PMID 21312883.
- Opper FH, Isaacs KL, Warshauer DM (December 1990). "Esophageal obstruction with a dietary fiber product designed for weight reduction". Journal of Clinical Gastroenterology. 12 (6): 667–9. doi:10.1097/00004836-199012000-00014. PMC 2176230. PMID 2176230.
- Mann I, Kilner TP (January 1943). "Deficiency of the Malar Bones with Defect of the Lower Lids: With Notes of a Similar Case, Treatment and Suggestions". The British Journal of Ophthalmology. 27 (1): 13–20. doi:10.1136/bjo.27.1.13. PMC 510292. PMID 18169892.
- Gillies HD, Kilner TP, Stone D (1 April 1927). "Fractures of the Malar-zygomatic compound: With a description of a new X-ray position". British Journal of Surgery. 14 (56): 651–656. doi:10.1002/bjs.1800145612. S2CID 72080297.
- Kilner TP (February 1958). "The management of the patient with cleft lip and/or palate". American Journal of Surgery. 95 (2): 204–10. doi:10.1016/0002-9610(58)90503-8. PMID 13487941.
