= Nasal reconstruction using a paramedian forehead flap =

Medical surgery technique for nasal defects

Nasal reconstruction using a paramedian forehead flap within oral and maxillofacial surgery, is a surgical technique to reconstruct different kinds of nasal defects. In this operation a reconstructive surgeon uses skin from the forehead above the eyebrow and pivots it vertically to replace missing nasal tissue. Throughout history the technique has been modified and adjusted by many different surgeons and it has evolved to become a popular way of repairing nasal defects.

The tint of forehead skin so exactly matches that of the face and nose that it must be first choice. Is not the forehead the crowning feature of the face and important in expression? Why then should we jeopardize its beauty to make a nose? First, because in many instances, the forehead makes far and away the best nose. Second, with some plastic juggling, the forehead defect can be camouflaged effectively.

— Sir Harold Gillies and D. Ralph Millard

== History ==
Probably the first nasal reconstructions using a forehead flap were performed by Sushruta in India during 600 to 700 BC. The method was introduced in Europe in the 15th century. The first English description of the Indian midline forehead rhinoplasty was published in the Madras Gazette in 1793 and later Carpue, an English surgeon, published his experience with two successful median forehead flaps in 1816. The classic median forehead flap supplied by paired supratrochlear vessels was popularized in the United States by Kazanjian in 1947, however, this flap was not optimal because it was not long enough. To solve the problem of the short median forehead flap, its design was modified so that central forehead tissue could be transferred on a unilateral paramedian blood supply.

== Indications ==
A forehead flap is usually required if the nasal defect is larger than 1.5 cm, requires replacement of support or lining, or if it is located within the infratip or columella. If the defect is small and superficial it can be resurfaced with a skin graft or it can heal by secondary intention. Limited alar defects can be resurfaced using a nasolabial flap, however, the amount of tissue available from the nasolabial area is limited and the flap is thicker, less vascular, and hair bearing in males.

Nasal defects mostly result from excision of (malignant) skin tumours as basal cell carcinoma, squamous cell carcinoma, melanoma, keratoacanthoma, lentigo maligna, lymphoma, and sweat gland carcinoma. Other acquired nasal defects are usually caused by trauma, burns or sepsis.

The forehead flap is known as the best donor site for repairing nasal defects because of its size, superior vascularity, skin color, texture and thickness. Especially the color and texture of the forehead skin matches exactly with the skin of the nose. This is why the forehead flap is used so much for nasal reconstruction.

== Principles ==
=== Vascularisation ===
Vascularisation of the scalp and forehead is supplied by the supraorbital, supratrochlear, superficial temporal, postauricular and occipital vessels. All these vessels are lined vertically and permit safe and effective transfer of the forehead flap on multiple individual vascular pedicles. The pedicle is the anatomic part that resembles the stem of the flap. The perfusion of the paramedian forehead flap comes from three sources: randomly, through the frontalis muscle and through the supratrochlear artery. Because the forehead flap is an axial flap with a pedicle containing its dominant vessel, the pedicle can safely be narrowed to 1 to 1.2 cm.

=== Flap design ===
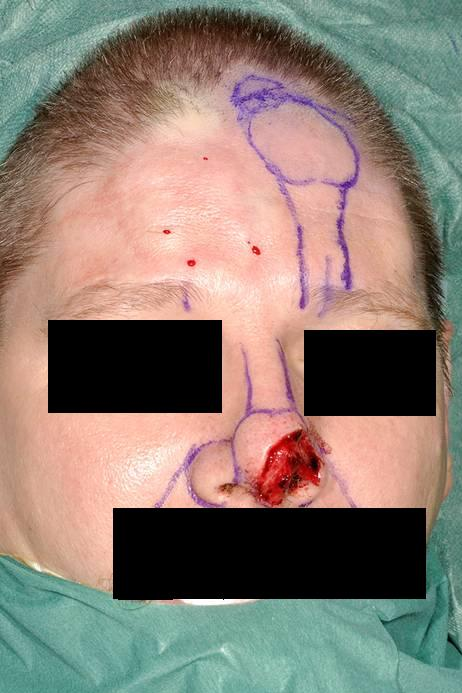
Figure 1. Example of a paramedian forehead flap design

Four types of flap design are historically described in literature: the median forehead flap, oblique forehead flap, sickle flap and vertical paramedian forehead flap. However, the vertical paramedian forehead flap based on the ipsilateral or contralateral supratrochlear vessels has become standard, because it has a low turning point, making it easy to reach the defect without using hair-bearing scalp. Also, primary closing of the proximal forehead is possible as a result of the narrow pedicle.

Lateral nasal defects are usually closed with an ipsilateral paramedian forehead flap. Central nasal defects can be reconstructed using either a right- or left-sided forehead flap. The ipsilateral pedicle is closer to the defect than the contralateral pedicle, therefore the flap can be made shorter when using the ipsilateral side. Some experts suggest that a contralateral flap is easier to rotate, but this difference is minimal. The only problem with the contralateral flap is the extra length needed, not the difficulty of the technique.

Most foreheads are at least 5 cm long, when measured from eyebrow to hairline. This is usually enough to resurface the entire nose using a vertical paramedian forehead flap design. Still, there are some short foreheads. A forehead is called short when it is shorter than 4.5 cm. When using the forehead flap on a short forehead, there are multiple ways to get the length that is needed. First, the turning point of the flap can be moved down, so that the base of the flap is closer to the nasal defect and a shorter flap can be used to reach the nasal defect. Second, the distal end of the flap can be placed within the hairline. The reconstructed nose will then have some hair on it, but it can be plucked, depilated or lasered.

=== Principles of aesthetic regional unit repair ===
Aesthetic regions are used to describe the normal features of the face. These regions (forehead, cheeks, eyelids, lips, nose and chin) are defined by skin quality, border outline, and three-dimensional contour. The nose has nine aesthetic subunits, which are most important for reconstruction of the nose. These subunits are: the tip, dorsum, alae, sidewalls, columella, and soft triangles. For an optimal aesthetic result, scars should be positioned between nasal subunits. If enlarging the defect will make the aesthetic result better, normal tissue within the subunit can be safely removed.

For reconstructing any nasal defect, the contralateral side should be used as a guide. Templates of the defect should be made based on the healthy contralateral side. This is important for defining dimension, outline, and landmark position. If more than 50% of a convex nasal subunit (tip, ala nasi) is missing, resurfacing the entire nasal subunit is better than only resurfacing the defect. Ideally, nasal reconstruction is performed on a stable platform. Support and shaping by soft tissue sculpting should be accomplished before pedicle division. Concha, septum or rib cartilage grafts should be used for creating enough support and a good shape.

A second repair can sometimes be required; causes are recurrence of cancer, new cancer or new trauma. A second flap can be harvested from the contralateral forehead after a prior vertical flap. If an oblique or angled flap was used during the first surgery, the second repair becomes more difficult. On one side the pedicle is destroyed and on the other side the forehead is scarred. This is another reason to use the unilateral paramedian forehead flap design.

=== Donor site closing ===
The donor defect after using a paramedian forehead flap is limited to the central-lateral forehead. The defect is closed as much as possible using a T-shaped scar. The adjoining tissues are pulled together vertically and horizontally. Often there is a persisting defect depending on the size of the flap. Any possible resultant defect is high in the forehead and left to heal by secondary intention. Eyebrow malformation can occur, but is usually avoided if this method is used correctly.

== Technique ==
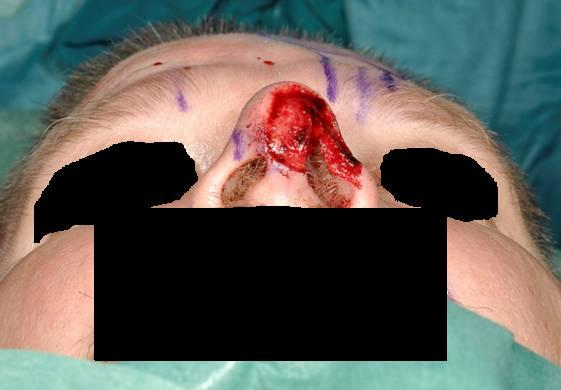
Figure 2. The nasal defect after adjustment to the aesthetical subunits

Figure 3. The full-thickness forehead flap is sutured into the recipient site during stage one

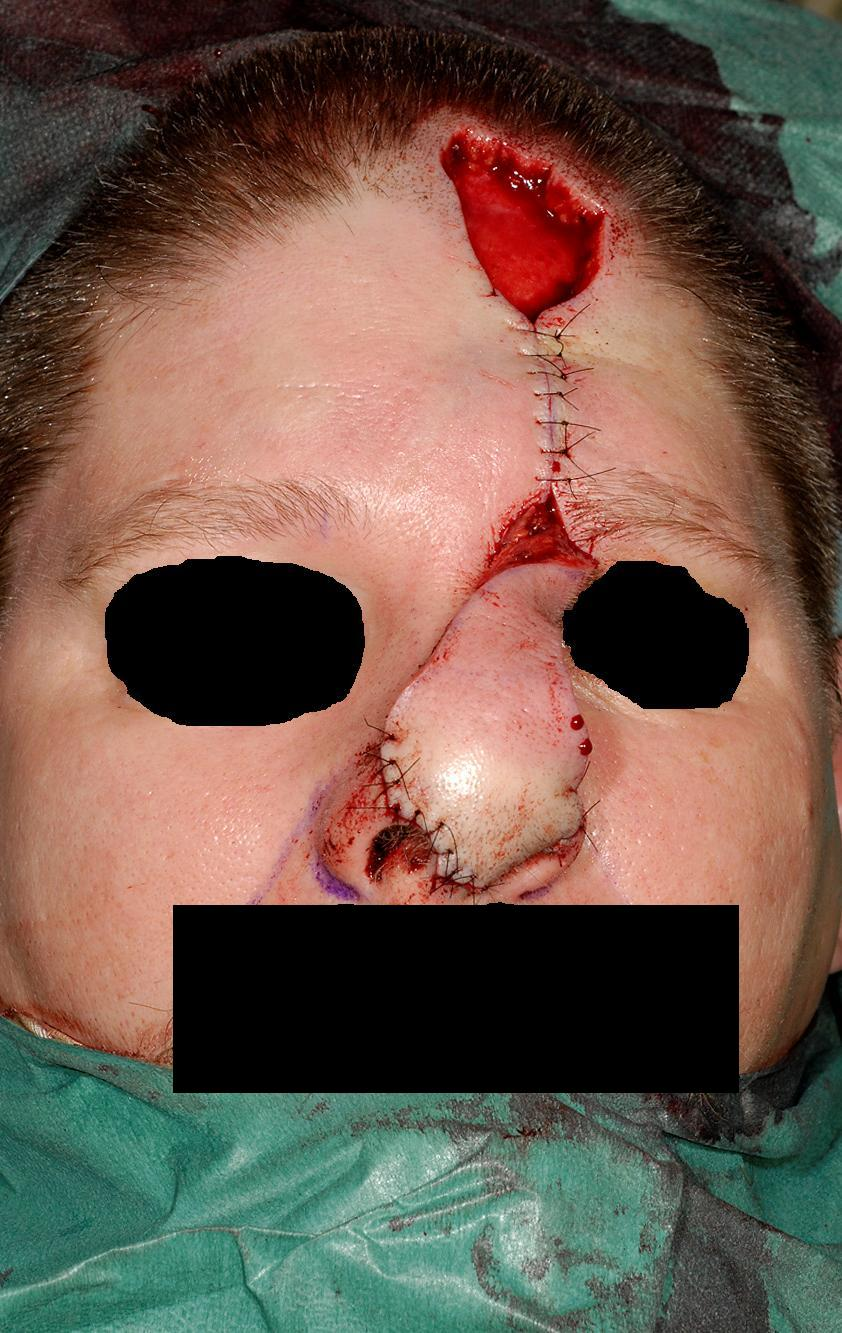
Figure 4. The result after stage 1, without initial thinning of the flap

Figure 5. Situation before the second stage of reconstruction

Figure 6. Elevation and thinning of the flap during stage 2

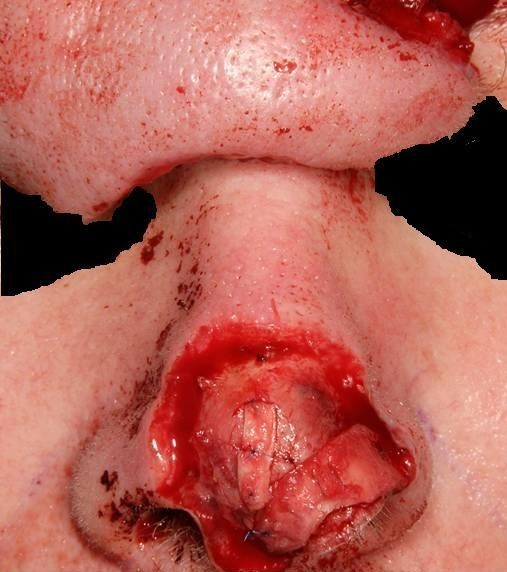
Figure 7. The healed excess soft tissue and cartilage have been sculpted to improve contour

Figure 8. The thinned forehead skin is returned to the contoured recipient

Figure 9. The result after a three-stage forehead flap

The two most used forehead flap techniques are the two stage and three stage forehead flap. The forehead consists of multiple layers; skin, subcutaneous tissue, frontalis muscle with fascia and a thin areolar layer. Traditionally, the forehead flap is transferred in two stages, where the flap is thinned during the first stage to improve the aesthetic result, possibly jeopardizing its vascularity and increasing chance for flap necrosis. To overcome this problem, Menick described a three-stage forehead flap technique, where initially the flap is transferred containing all tissue layers, making it an extremely safe technique. Only during the second stage, the flap - which now acts as a delayed flap - can safely be thinned aggressively according to aesthetic needs. During the final stage the pedicle is severed, the flap is thinned further and pedicle and flap are trimmed and inset. This three stage flap is especially useful for reconstructing large defects, complex contour deformations, or lining defects, while the two stage flap is used for smaller and superficial defects.

Before surgery all important landmarks and reference points must be identified and marked. Important landmarks are the hairline, frown lines, location of the supratrochlear vessels, outline of the defect, nasal and lip subunits. Then templates are made using the intact side of the nose to make a precise symmetric reconstruction of the nose. The template resembling the defect is placed just under the hairline and the vascular pedicle is drawn downwards into the medial eyebrow. The pedicle is based on the supratrochlear vessels and can be 1.2 cm wide. This way the flap design has been made.

=== Two-stage flap ===
==== First stage ====
The flap is incised and elevated from distal to proximal. Distally, the frontalis muscle and subcutaneous tissue are excised, this is done for 1.5 to 2 cm. Then more downwards the disscection goes through the muscle and over the periosteum. When reaching the brow, all of the skin borders are incised and the flap is carefully released. As soon as the flap reaches the defect without tension further incision of the flap is stopped and the flap is inset into the area of the defect. This is done using a single layer of fine suture.

==== Second stage ====
The second stage is three to four weeks later, when the flap is well healed at the recipient site. At this stage the pedicle is divided, the inferior forehead is reopened and the proximal pedicle replaces the medial brow by an inverted V. The nose side of the pedicle is elevated superiorly with 2 mm of subcutaneous fat. If needed the recipient site can be altered to reach a better aesthetic result. The scar is eventually sculpted between the nasal subregions to create a satisfying aesthetic result.

=== Three stage flap ===
==== First stage ====
The flap is incised and elevated over the periosteum from distal to proximal. The flap consists of skin, subcutaneous tissue, fat and frontalis muscle and is not thinned. When reaching the brow, all of the skin borders are incised and the flap is carefully released. The full-thickness flap is then sutured into the defect without tension.

==== Second stage ====
Three to four weeks later, when the full thickness forehead flap is well healed at the recipient site, the second stage begins. The skin of the flap and 3–4 mm of subcutaneous fat is elevated. The underlying excess of soft tissue is then excised and the remaining healed tissue is sculpted in an ideal nasal subunit. The flap is then resutured to the recipient site.

==== Third stage ====
This stage is completely identical to the second stage of the two stage forehead flap.

=== Revision ===
For an optimal aesthetic result a difficult nose reconstruction is often followed by revision surgery. There are different types of revisions: minor revisions, major revisions and reoperations. Revisions are done not sooner than eight months after completion of the primary forehead flap technique.

== Results ==
The goal of nasal reconstruction is to look as normal as possible after reconstruction. The results of nasal reconstruction using the paramedian forehead flap are quite good, although some patients report functional difficulties. Airway passage difficulties, mucosal crusts, dry mucosa, and difficulties with smelling are uncommon. A minority of the patients reported snoring more often or having a spontaneous nose bleed more often. Difficulties with phonation are not likely to occur. The majority of patients are satisfied with function of the nose after reconstruction.

Ideally, standardized semistructered interviews are used to assess aesthetic outcome after nasal reconstruction. Studies using these interviews showed that generally patients are very satisfied with the result although they reported aggravating of their nasal appearance compared to before surgery. Patients were especially satisfied with flap color match and shape of the nasal tip. Remarkably, patients scored subjective aesthetic outcome significantly higher compared to a professional panel.

In comparison to the two stage flap, the three stage flap technique has shown better results, lower revision rates and more possibilities for use of skin grafts for lining. Most likely this is because of the reliable vascularisation of the three stage flap.

== Complications ==
=== Flap necrosis ===
Because of the flap's rich perfusion, flap necrosis is unlikely to occur. If it happens the result of severe ischemia is normally caused by excessive tension on the flap, a misidentification of past injury, nearby scar formation, fanatic inset to the recipient site or exaggerated flap thinning. To solve the problem, to keep the underlying cartilage from infecting and to stop the situation from getting worse, it is better to excise dead tissue at an early stage than to wait watchfully allowing the injury to heal secondarily

=== Infection ===
It is unlikely for the operation area to get infected. In this situation failure in aseptic techniques or necrosis of the lining are the main causes. Early discovery of infection is very important so complete debridement can take place before underlying cartilage is exposed. Chronically infected cartilage is cured by reelevating the flap and excising the infected parts.

=== Recurrence/ inadequate initial reconstruction ===
In some patients a new tumor develops in the skin injured by the sun or an old cancer can redevelop. In a few cases the result of the first reconstruction was not good enough. When this takes place the next step is to take away the old flap and redo the reconstruction. A second flap can be taken from the contra lateral side in most instances

=== Eyebrow malposition ===
The defect created at the donor site is usually positioned at the central/lateral forehead. The defect can be closed by pulling the different sides of the wound together in vertical and horizontal direction. If there is a resulting defect after closure it is situated high in the forehead and it closes by secondary healing. In spite of the fact that, as a result, the eyebrow could be distorted, this is usually avoided. As a result of a large initial defect, the flap has to be larger and the bigger the forehead defect will be. When there is a large resultant forehead defect it logically lies closer to the eyebrow. That is why there is a significant risk of superior eyebrow malposition, especially if a horizontal or oblique oriented forehead flap is used. Then the solution is to close the remaining defect with a skin graft. However a skin graft is esthetically inferior and will always look like a shiny, irregularly pigmented, mismatched piece of skin. Alternatively, secondary placement of a tissue expander in the forehead can be used to correct the eyebrow malposition and to excise the skin graft and primarily close the forehead defect.

== See also ==
- Cosmetic surgery
- Orthognathic surgery
- Oral and maxillofacial pathology
- Craniofacial surgery
- Cranio-maxillofacial trauma
- Otorhinolaryngology
- Plastic surgery
