= Roberta Cowell =

British racing driver (1918–2011)

- Roberta Cowell in Paris, early 1950s
- Born: 8 April 1918; Croydon, London, England
- Died: 11 October 2011 (aged 93); Hampton, London, England
- Education: University College London
- Occupations: Racing driver, pilot, business owner
- Spouse: Diana Margaret Zelma Carpenter (1941–1952; divorced)
- Children: 2
- Parents: Sir Ernest Marshall Cowell; Dorothy Elizabeth Miller
- Military career
- Allegiance: United Kingdom
- Branch: Royal Air Force
- Service years: 1942–1945
- Rank: Pilot officer
- Conflicts: Second World War

Roberta Elizabeth Marshall Cowell (born Robert Marshall Cowell; 8 April 1918 – 11 October 2011) was a British racing driver and Second World War fighter pilot. She was the first known British trans woman to undergo gender-affirming surgery in 1951.

== Early life ==
Cowell was born on 8 April 1918 in Croydon, London, one of three children of Major-General Sir Ernest Marshall Cowell KBE CB (1886–1971) and Dorothy Elizabeth Miller Cowell, Lady Cowell (1886–1962).

Cowell attended Whitgift School, a boys' public school in Croydon and was an enthusiastic member of the school's Motor Club, along with John Cunningham, who would later be famous as an RAF night fighter ace and test pilot. (Note: Her autobiography does not name her school, but states Cunningham was a fellow pupil. Whitgift was the school Cunningham attended.) Towards the end of her school days, she visited Belgium, Germany, and Austria with a school friend. At the time, one of her hobbies was photography and filmmaking, and she was briefly arrested in Germany for shooting a cine film of a group of Nazis drilling. She secured her release by agreeing to destroy the film, but was able to substitute unused film stock, and keep the original footage.

Cowell left school at the age of 16 to join General Aircraft Limited as an apprentice aircraft engineer, but soon left to join the Royal Air Force, becoming an acting pilot officer on probation on 4 August 1936; Cowell began training, but was discharged because of airsickness.

In 1936, Cowell began studying engineering at University College London. Also in that year, she began motor-racing, winning her class at the Land's End Speed Trial in a Riley. She gained initial experience of the sport by sneaking into the area where cars were serviced at the Brooklands racing circuit, wearing mechanic's overalls, and offering help to any driver or mechanic who wanted it. By 1939, she owned three cars and had competed in the 1939 Antwerp Grand Prix.

== Second World War ==
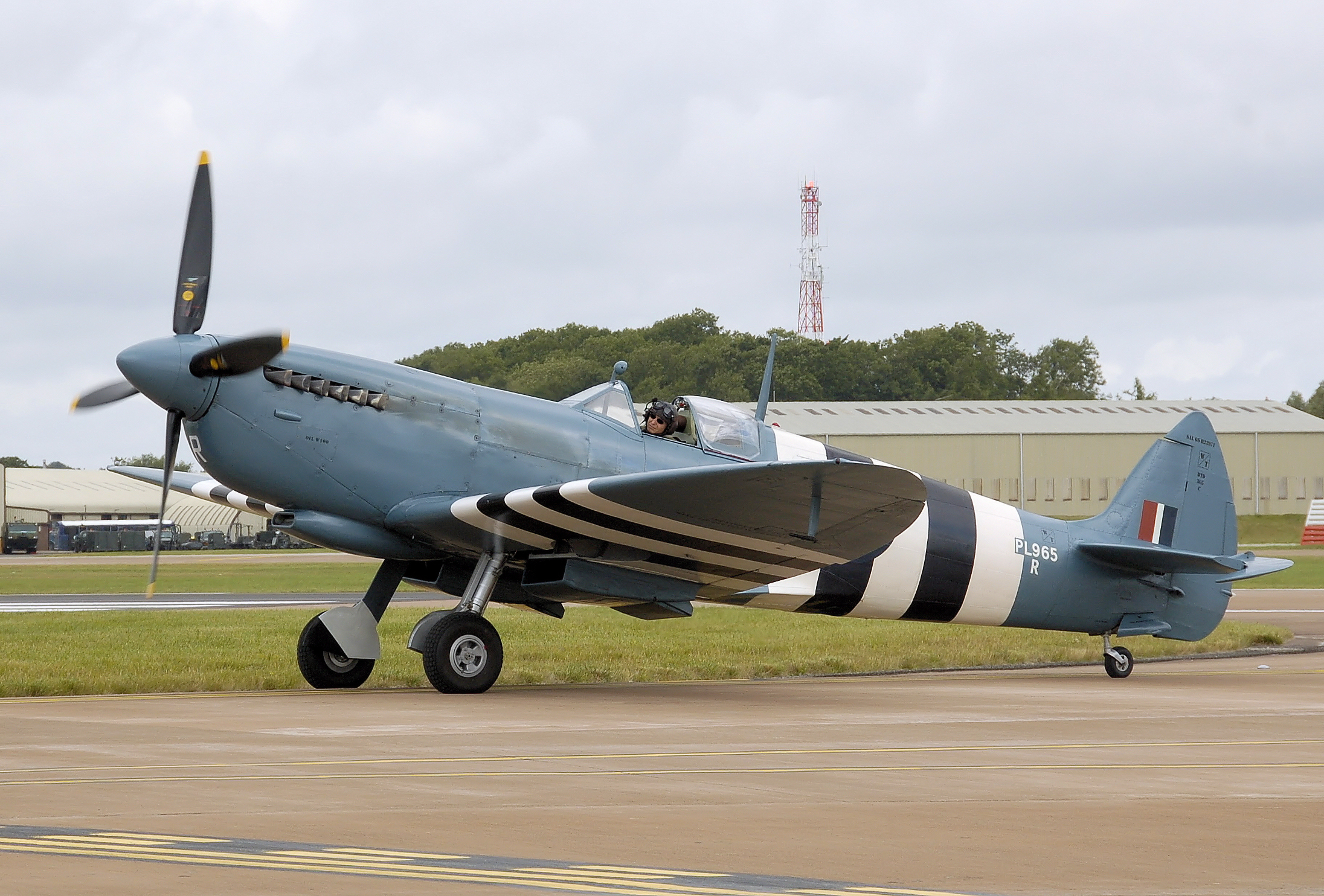
A preserved, photo-reconnaissance Spitfire PR. XI (2008)

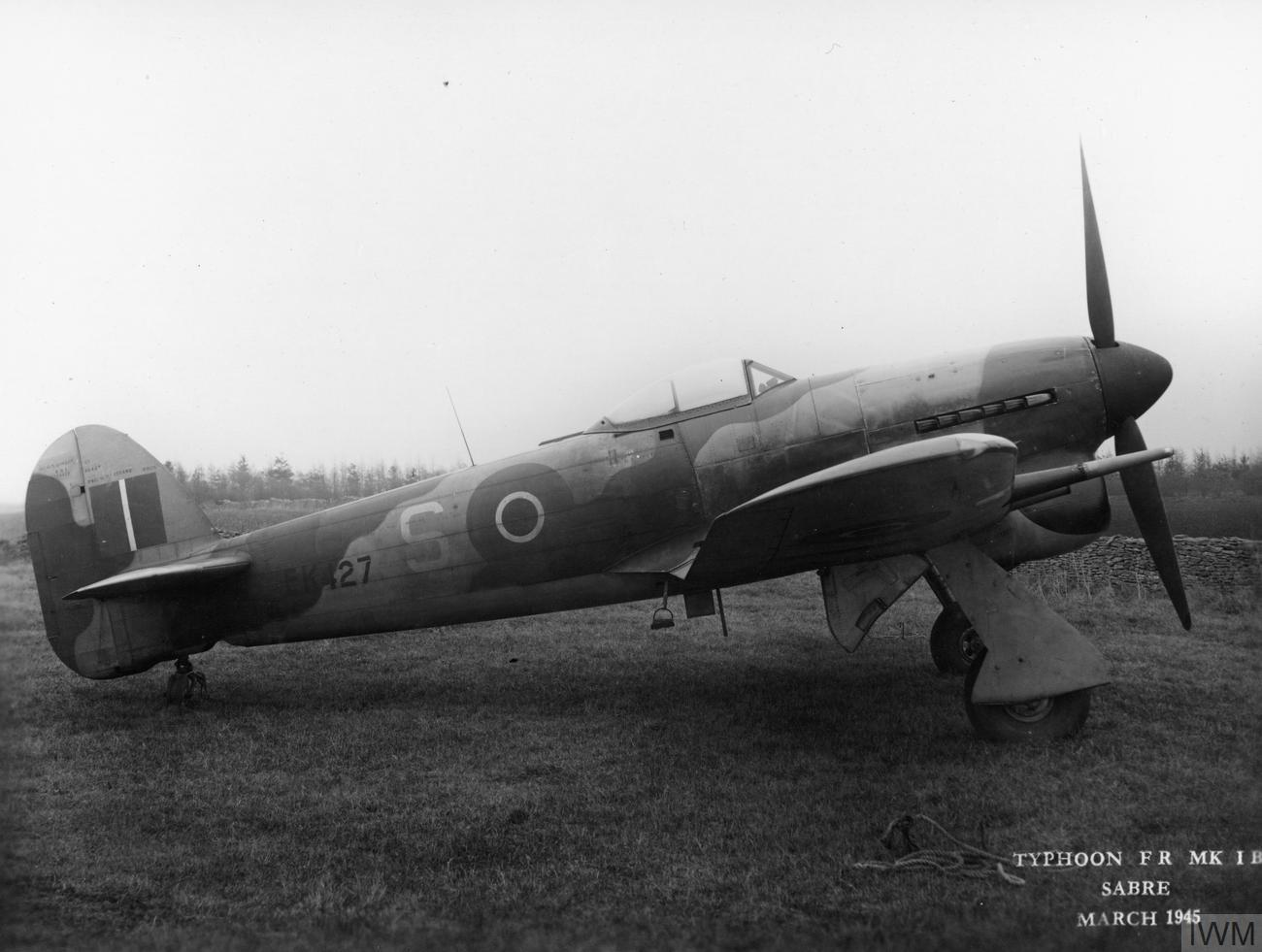
Hawker Typhoon FR IB, number EK427; this aircraft was flown by 4 Squadron (March 1945)

On 28 December 1940, Cowell was commissioned into the Royal Army Service Corps as second lieutenant. In June 1941, she married, before transferring from the Army to the RAF on 24 January 1942 with the rank of pilot officer (temporary). She had obtained a private pilot's licence before the war and completed RAF flying training at RAF Ansty.

Cowell served a tour with a front-line Spitfire squadron (Note: Unnamed in her autobiography.) and then briefly as an instructor. By June 1944, she was flying with No. 4 Squadron RAF, a squadron assigned to the task of aerial reconnaissance. During the course of the war the squadron had flown a variety of aircraft types but by mid–1944 it was flying the Spitfire PR. XI, an unarmed, camera-equipped version of the Supermarine Spitfire. Shortly before the D-Day landings, on 4 June 1944, she had a lucky escape when the oxygen system of her Spitfire malfunctioned at 31,000 feet (9,400 m) over Fruges, France. She passed out but the aircraft continued flying on its own for around an hour over German-occupied France while being subjected to German anti-aircraft fire, she regained semi-consciousness at low altitude and was able to fly back to the squadron's base at RAF Gatwick.

By October 1944, 4 Squadron was based at Deurne, Belgium, on the outskirts of Antwerp and its Spitfires were supplemented by an allocation of Hawker Typhoon FR IBs, a photo-reconnaissance version of the Hawker Typhoon fighter-bomber. (Note: Built in small numbers, the FR IB was intended for photo-reconnaissance at very low level and was intended to complement the Spitfire reconnaissance aircraft, which were operated at high altitude. Unlike the Spitfire, it was armed – one of the Typhoon's four cannon was removed and three F24 cameras were fitted in its place, one pointing forwards and two down. However, although the Typhoon was well regarded as a combat aircraft, the reconnaissance version was unpopular with pilots and unsatisfactory in this role – inherent engine and airframe vibrations invariably blurred the photographs.) On 18 November 1944, Cowell was piloting one of a pair of Typhoons (Note: She was flying Typhoon number EK429,see: Franks (2000). The other aircraft was flown by Flt. Lt. Draper.) on a low-level sortie near Bocholt, Germany. South east of Kessel, Cowell attacked targets on the ground, but her aircraft's engine was knocked out and its wing holed by German anti-aircraft fire. Cowell was flying too low to bail-out and instead jettisoned the cockpit canopy and glided her Typhoon to a successful deadstick crash-landing. She was able to contact her companion by radio and confirm she was unhurt before being captured by German troops. Cowell made two escape attempts, reasoning that the chances of success were greatest if the attempt was made quickly, while still close to the front–line. However, the attempts failed and she was taken further into Germany, spending several weeks in solitary confinement at an interrogation centre for captured Allied aircrew, before being moved to the prisoner-of-war camp Stalag Luft I.

Cowell remained a prisoner for around five months, occupying the time by teaching classes in automotive engineering to fellow inmates. In her biography, she describes the situational sexual behaviour shown by some of the camp's Allied prisoners, and her discomfort at being propositioned by prisoners who assumed she also wanted to take part in this. She was offered the part of a woman in a camp theatrical production but turned it down, as she thought this would make her appear homosexual in the eyes of other prisoners. Towards the end of the war, food became short at the camp; Cowell lost 50 pounds (23 kg) in weight, and later described killing the camp's cats and eating them raw because of hunger.

By April 1945, the advancing Red Army was approaching. The initial German intention was to evacuate the camp, but the prisoners refused to leave. After negotiations between the senior American officer and German Kommandant, the Germans guarding Stalag Luft I abandoned it and evacuated towards the west, leaving the prisoners behind. The unguarded and undefended camp was reached by the Red Army on the night of 30 April 1945. Commonwealth personnel were flown back to the United Kingdom some two weeks later, between 12 and 14 May, by aircraft of the United States Army Air Forces. (Note: Known as Operation Revival, the repatriation of prisoners used American transport aircraft for the sick and wounded, and Boeing B-17 Flying Fortress bombers for the healthy. Wooden floor–boards were installed in the B–17s' bomb-bays, to make an extemporized passenger compartment and as many as 30 men were crammed into each bomber. Commonwealth ex-prisoners were flown to the United Kingdom, American ex-prisoners were flown to Camp Lucky Strike near Le Havre, France, for return to the United States by sea. The Western Allies were anxious to quickly remove their personnel from areas under Soviet control, for fear they might be used as hostages.: Howland, John (21 March 2004). "Operation Revival: Rescuing the POWs from Stalag Luft 1" (PDF). 91st Bomb Group Memorial Association. Archived (PDF) from the original on 25 November 2011.)

== Postwar and personal life ==
In June 1941, Cowell married Diana Margaret Zelma Carpenter (1917–2006), who also had been an engineering student at UCL with an interest in motor racing. (Note: Diana Carpenter was the first woman to graduate from UCL with an engineering degree.)

After demobilisation, Cowell was engaged in a number of business ventures until, in 1946, she founded a motor-racing team and competed in events across Europe, including the Brighton Speed Trials and the Grand Prix at Rouen-Les-Essarts. However her autobiography describes this as a time of great distress and clinical depression. She also experienced traumatic flashbacks when watching the film Mine Own Executioner, in which the hero is shot-down by anti-aircraft fire while flying a Spitfire.

Diana and Roberta had two daughters (born July 1942 and August 1944), but the marriage was unhappy. Cowell later wrote: "there had been an underlying air of falseness about it. It is difficult and painful for me to say much about this marriage. But it must be clear from the way we lived — our house was at Hove, in Sussex, and I worked 53 miles away, commuting by car seven days a week, with a weekly trip to Manchester, 290 miles away, thrown in—that the two paths of marriage never joined for very long in our case, and that the rocks between them were very high indeed. By 1948, we had separated, although the divorce decree was not made absolute until 1952". Diana won the divorce on grounds of desertion, and later remarried. The children went to live with relatives.

After the separation, Cowell continued to suffer from depression. She sought out a leading Freudian psychiatrist of the time, but was unsatisfied by the help he offered. Sessions with a second Freudian psychiatrist, described in her biography only as a Scottish man with a less orthodox approach to his profession, gradually revealed, in her own words, that her "unconscious mind was predominantly female" and "feminine side of my nature, which all my life I had known of and severely repressed, was very much more fundamental and deep-rooted than I had supposed".

== Transition and surgery ==
By 1950, Cowell was taking large doses of estrogen, but was still living as a man. She had become acquainted with Michael Dillon, a British physician who was the first trans man to get a phalloplasty, after reading his 1946 volume Self: A Study in Endocrinology and Ethics. This work proposed that individuals should have the right to change gender, to have the kind of body they desired. The two developed a close friendship. Dillon subsequently carried out an inguinal orchiectomy on Cowell. Secrecy was necessary for this as the procedure was then illegal in the United Kingdom under so-called "mayhem" laws and no surgeon would agree to perform it openly.

Cowell then presented herself to a private Harley Street gynaecologist and was able to obtain from him a document stating she was intersex. This allowed her to have a new birth certificate issued, with her recorded sex changed to female. She had a vaginoplasty on 15 May 1951. The operation was carried out by Sir Harold Gillies, widely considered the father of plastic surgery, with the assistance of American surgeon Ralph Millard. Gillies had operated on Michael Dillon, but phalloplasty was then an entirely novel procedure, which Gillies developed using his experience of reconstructing penises of soldiers who had endured injuries from explosive blasts. The name on her birth certificate was changed on 17 May of that year, on production of a statutory declarations by Cowell and Charles Eugene Dusseau, who was a Canadian doctor.

=== Public and press reaction ===
According to the Sydney Daily Telegraph in March 1954, the British press were sceptical that a sex change had occurred, reporting that medical experts consulted by them had debunked the claim that Cowell had changed her sex, after she had sold her story to Picture Post for £20,000. It reported that Dusseau had said that the certificate that allowed the patient to reregister as a female was not meant to prove that Cowell had become a physiologically complete female. "It was rather in the nature of a working certificate to enable plastic surgeons to carry out their operations."

However The Daily Telegraph also reported "Publicity resulting from the Cowell case has brought forward an astonishing number of men who want to emulate Cowell's example. One British doctor reported this week that he had received 456 demands for similar operations".

== Later life and death ==
By 1954, her two business ventures, a racing car engineering company (Leacroft of Egham) and a clothing company had both ceased trading and her change of legal gender had made it impossible for her to continue Grand Prix motor racing. However, in March 1954, news of her gender reassignment broke, gaining public interest around the world. In the United Kingdom, her story was published in the magazine Picture Post, and Cowell received a fee of around £8,000 from the magazine (equivalent to £190,000 in 2025, when adjusted for inflation). Cowell's biography was published soon after this, earning a further £1,500 (£35,700 in 2025).

In the United States, the widespread sensation caused by the news stories about Christine Jorgensen in 1952 had introduced the American public to the concept of changing sex, and the press had continued to print a steady stream of stories about others who had done so, mostly trans women. Such reports tended to conflate the concepts of sexual orientation and gender identity, so transsexuality had become closely associated in the public mind with male homosexuality (during this period, highly taboo) and effeminacy amongst men. Cowell's story consequently appeared confusing as it disrupted this narrative. Her marriage, her parenting of children, her wartime combat service and her association with motor racing were, during this period, perceived as strong markers of heterosexual masculinity; these aspects of her life were described repeatedly in press reports.

She continued to be active in motor racing and attracted some publicity for winning the 1957 Shelsley Walsh Speed Hill Climb. In November 1958, she acquired an ex-RAF de Havilland Mosquito (number TK-655, civil registration G-AOSS). Her intention was to use the aircraft for a record-breaking flight over the South Atlantic. However, the project fell through due to a lack of suitable engines and in 1958 she became bankrupt with debts totalling £12,580 (approximately £256,100 in 2025). By 1959, G-AOSS was a derelict hulk and its remains were scrapped in 1960.

Her financial difficulties continued, as she found it difficult to get employment. In later years, she largely dropped out of the public eye. However she was still an active figure in British motor racing in the 1970s. She also continued flying and by this time had logged over 1,600 hours as a pilot.

A brief interview with Sunday Times journalist Michael Bateman appeared in March 1972, when she was working on an (unpublished) second biography. In the interview, she stated she was an intersex individual with the chromosomal abnormality XX male syndrome, and that the condition justified her transition. (Note: XX-male syndrome is sometimes known as de la Chapelle syndrome, for the Finnish researcher who characterized it in, 1972; de la Chapelle A (1972). "Analytic review: nature and origin of males with XX sex chromosomes". Am J Hum Genet. 24 (1): 71–105. PMC 1762158. PMID 4622299.. Those with this condition have a female genotype, but are usually typical boys or men. However, Roberta Cowell stated in her biography she had two children, in July 1942 and August 1944 (see Cowell (1954), chapter 4), and individuals with XX-male syndrome are sterile, due to Azoospermia. Often, they only become aware of their condition when being evaluated for infertility.) She also spoke in derogatory terms of those individuals with XY chromosomes who also underwent male to female gender reassignment, saying "The people who have followed me have often been those with male chromosomes, XY. So they've been normal people who've turned themselves into freaks by means of the operation."

In the 1990s, Cowell moved into sheltered accommodation in Hampton, London, although she continued to own and drive large, powerful cars.

She died on 11 October 2011. Her funeral was attended by only six people and (on her instructions) was unpublicised; her death was not publicly reported until two years later, when a profile of her was printed in The Independent newspaper in October 2013. The New York Times published Cowell's obituary on 5 June 2020.

== See also ==
- List of transgender people
- List of transgender-related topics
