= Norman Rowe =

Norman Rowe may refer to:

- Norman Lester Rowe (1915–1991), British surgeon
- Norm Rowe (1926–2016), Canadian rower
- Normie Rowe (born 1947), Australian singer-songwriter
