= Queen Elizabeth's Grammar School, Blackburn =

Coordinates: 53.753°N 2.496°W

Location
- West Park Road; Blackburn, Lancashire, BB2 6DF; England

Information
- Type: Free school
- Motto: Disce Prodesse (Loosely translated as "Learn to be of service")
- Religious affiliation: Church of England
- Established: 1509; 517 years ago
- Founder: Thomas Stanley, 2nd Earl of Derby
- Local authority: Blackburn with Darwen
- Department for Education URN: 141165 Tables
- Ofsted: Reports
- Headteacher: Claire Gammon
- Gender: Coeducational
- Age: 4 to 18
- Houses: 6
- Colour
- Publication: Q-news, Q-review
- Former Pupils: Old Blackburnians
- School Seal: Latin: SIGILIUM COMUNE LIBERAE SCHOLAE GRAMATICALIS DNAE REGINA ELIZABETH BLACKBURNIA; Common seal of Queen Elizabeth's free grammar school Blackburn
- Website: http://www.qegsblackburn.com

Queen Elizabeth's Grammar School (QEGS) is a co-educational state-funded comprehensive free school in Blackburn, Lancashire, England. Founded in 1509 as a boys' school, it is now a co-educational all-through free school with over 1200 students from ages 4 to 18. Pupils come from a very wide geographical area, from Bolton to the south and to Colne in the east. It consists of an Infant School (Reception to Year 2), Junior School (Years 3 to 6), Senior School (Years 7 to 11) and Sixth Form.

== History ==
The school was founded in 1509, the first year of the reign of King Henry VIII, by Thomas Stanley, 2nd Earl of Derby, as a chantry school. It was situated adjacent to Blackburn Parish Church. The school survived the Reformation and in 1567 was granted a Royal Charter by Queen Elizabeth I. It thus became the “Free Grammar School of Queen Elizabeth in Blackburn in the County of Lancashire”.

In August 1819, the decision was taken to demolish the old parish church and rebuild it (the new church of St Mary the Virgin is now Blackburn Cathedral) and the school moved to a temporary home in nearby Market Street Lane until 1825. Its new site from 1825 was in the Bull Meadow area (“in the fresh air of the country”) but, as Blackburn itself expanded during the Industrial Revolution, the school there became too cramped.

In 1884, the Blackburn Grammar School, as it was then known, made one final move. The new site was on the west side of the town’s Corporation Park, close to Alexandra Meadows, the home of the East Lancashire Cricket Club and also the venue for a number of the early fixtures of the local football club Blackburn Rovers.

By the 20th century, the school was increasingly known as "Queen Elizabeth's Grammar School", its current name. It also began to outgrow its premises and began expanding. The Harrison Playing Fields at Lammack were opened in 1920. The junior department moved to its new premises known as "Horncliffe", which the junior school was known as for over half a century, and renovations on the "Big School" were completed in 1930.

The school adopted independent status under the provisions of the Education Act of 1944 and later became a direct grant grammar school until the system was abolished in 1976. QEGS chose to revert to its independent status rather than join the state sector. In conjunction with the change of status, girls were accepted into the Sixth Form for the first time.

During the 1990s, QEGS was a participating school in the Assisted Places Scheme, which saw its pupil numbers grow dramatically. When the scheme was scrapped, the school administration was forced to limit its intake. In July 2001, co-education was extended to all years.

The Good Schools Guide described the students as "bright, industrious and confident without appearing complacent or alarmingly sophisticated."

In November 2012, the school announced its intention to apply to become a free school by 2014. In June 2017, the report from Ofsted determined the school "Requires improvement". However, in October 2019, the report from Ofsted recognised the school as "Good" with "Outstanding" features in Personal Development and Early Years Development. The report commended the "broad and ambitious curriculum" that pupils study and that highlighted that pupils benefit from a "stunning range of opportunities" to enhance their personal development.

In 2016, Claire Gammon, a former Mathematics teacher at the school, was appointed headteacher, the first ever female headteacher in over 500 years of school history.

== Pastoral care ==
In February 2005, the School was commended (amongst other things) for the high standard of pastoral care offered to its pupils by the ISI inspection. Q-Plus (Extended Hours Service) offers busy parents of Infant and Junior School pupils at QEGS a safe and secure environment for their children before and after the school day. The Breakfast Club runs from 7.45am each school day and children meet at the Q-Plus Club Room in Ormerod House on the Dukes Brow side of the site.

From here, they are escorted to Big School's the main dining hall to enjoy a range of breakfast options. After school, Q-Plus offers flexible collection arrangements, with children collected from the Infant School or Junior School and escorted back to the Q-Plus After-School Club.

== Academic ==
The school has a strong track record of academic success, with nearly all pupils achieving the nationally recognised benchmark of at least five passes at GCSE grades A*-C, including English and mathematics. Over 70% of A level candidates typically obtain a place on their first choice course at their first choice university. In August 2011, it achieved a 100% passing rate in the A Levels. It is one of the few schools which offers both GCSE and A Level Classics. Pupils have several languages on offer to study including Latin, French, Spanish and German.

== Sport ==
QEGS has also received a Sportsmark Gold award with Distinction for the school's outstanding commitment to sport and its links with local sports clubs. The QEGS 1st XI football team has won the Independent Schools Football Association Cup three times, the most recent victory coming in 2004. The school is one of the only Free schools in the area to offer Saturday sport, played at Lammack every Saturday morning during term-time.

== Notable Blackburnians ==
- Gary Aspden, Adidas designer
- James Beattie, professional footballer
- Ivor Bolton, conductor
- Robert Bolton, seventeenth century clergyman and theologian
- Richard Bowker, businessman and former chief executive of National Express and the Strategic Rail Authority
- Sir Harold Derbyshire MC QC, barrister and judge
- Nick Dougherty, golfer
- Christian Fraser, BBC foreign correspondent
- John Garstang, archaeologist, as well as author of A History of the Blackburn Grammar School published in 1897
- Krishnan Guru-Murthy, television presenter and journalist
- Russell Harty, television presenter and chat show host
- James Hatton Hall, planter and soldier
- Wayne Hemingway, fashion designer
- Richard Holden, politician
- Mick Jackson, author
- Thomas Kilner, plastic surgeon
- Sir Netar Mallick, professor of renal medicine
- Gordon Manley, climatologist
- Sir Ernest Marsden, MC, nuclear physicist
- Frank Brian Mercer, inventor, director of Netlon
- Prof. Julia Newton, Clinical Professor of Ageing and Medicine and Dean of Clinical Medicine at Newcastle University
- (John) Noel Nichols, inventor of Vimto
- Arnold Pomfret, Royal Navy rear-admiral and first-class cricketer
- Sophie Scott, neuroscientist
- Paul Snowdon, philosopher
- Michael Winterbottom, film director
- Daniel Burley Woolfall , 2nd President of FIFA

== Bibliography ==
Stocks, George Alfred (1909). The Records of Blackburn Grammar School, Vols I & II. Manchester: Chetham Society. ISBN 978-1334776144.
