= Ted Polhemus =

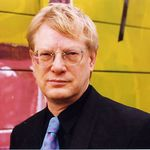
- Born: 1947; Neptune, New Jersey, United States
- Education: Temple University (BA, anthropology) University College London (M. Phil., anthropology)
- Occupations: Anthropologist, writer, and photographer
- Website: tedpolhemus.com

Ted Polhemus (born 1947 in Neptune, New Jersey, United States) is an American anthropologist, writer, and photographer who lives and works on England's south coast. His work focuses on fashion and anti-fashion, identity, and the sociology of style and of the body with the objective to explore the social and communicative importance of personal expression in style. He has written or edited more than a dozen books, and has taken many of the photographs that appear in them. He was the creator and curator of an exhibition, called "StreetStyle", at the Victoria & Albert Museum in London. One of his most popular books is "Streetstyle: From Sidewalk to Catwalk" (Thames & Hudson 1994), which he originally wrote as the book for the exhibition. Ted Polhemus wrote an updated version of Streetstyle, which PYMCA published in 2010. In 2011 he published a revised and expanded version of his early book Fashion & Anti-fashion. He also explored the social and cultural impact of the baby boom generation, culminating in the 2012 publication of BOOM! – A Baby Boomer Memoir, 1947-22.

== Bibliography ==
- Benthall, Jonathan & Ted Polhemus (editors). The Body As a Medium of Expression. Allen Lane (1975). ISBN 0-7139-0774-6.
- Polhemus, Ted. The Body Reader: Social Aspects of the Human Body. Pantheon Books (1978). ISBN 0-394-48792-3.
- Polhemus, Ted (editor). Social Aspects of the Human Body: A Reader of Key Texts. Penguin Books (1978). ISBN 0-14-080369-6.
- Polhemus, Ted & Lynn Procter. Fashion & Anti-fashion: Anthropology of Clothing and Adornment. Thames & Hudson (1978). ISBN 0-500-27118-6.
- Polhemus, Ted & Lynn Procter. Pop Styles. Vermilion (1984). ISBN 0-09-155801-8.
- Polhemus, Ted & Housk Randall. Rituals of Love: Sexual Experiments, Erotic Possibilities. Picador (1994). ISBN 0-330-33093-4.
- Polhemus, Ted. Streetstyle: From Sidewalk to Catwalk. Thames & Hudson (1994). ISBN 0-500-27794-X.
- Polhemus, Ted. Style Surfing: What to Wear in the 3rd Millennium. Thames & Hudson (1996). ISBN 0-500-27895-4.
- Polhemus, Ted. Body Art. Element Books (1998). ISBN 1-901881-24-5.
- Polhemus, Ted. Body Styles. Leonard Publishing (1998). ISBN 1-85291-008-9.
- Polhemus, Ted. Diesel: World Wide Wear. Watson-Guptill Publications (1998). ISBN 0-8230-1203-4.
- Polhemus, Ted (1998), "Mainstreaming Bike Culture: Bikes 'R' Us", in Drutt, Matthew (ed.), Motorcycle Mania; The biker book, Universe Publishing, pp. 91–97, ISBN 978-0-7893-0132-1
- Polhemus, Ted (1998), "The Art of the Motorcycle: Outlaws, Animals and Sex Machines", in Krens, Thomas; Drutt, Matthew (eds.), The Art of the Motorcycle, Harry N. Abrams, pp. 48–59, ISBN 978-0-8109-6912-4
- Polhemus, Ted & Housk Randall. The Customized Body. Serpent's Tail (2000). ISBN 1-85242-677-2.
- Polhemus, Ted. Hot Bodies, Cool Styles: New Techniques in Self-Adornment. Thames & Hudson (2004). ISBN 0-500-28500-4.
- Evans, Caroline; Suzy Menkes; Ted Polhemus; Bradley Quinn. Hussein Chayalan. NAi (2005). ISBN 90-5662-443-1.
- Mendini, Alessandro; Anna Piaggi; Ted Polhemus; Olivier Saillard; Colin McDowell. Yoox Attack. Trolley Books (2006).
- Polhemus, Ted. Streetstyle. PYMCA (2010).
- Polhemus, Ted. Fashion & Anti-fashion: Exploring adornment and dress from an anthropological perspective. lulu (2011)
- Polhemus, Ted. BOOM! – A Baby Boomer Memoir, 1947–2022. lulu (2012).
- Polhemus, Ted. Orbiting Neptune – A Baby Boomer Memoir. blurb (2012).
- Manandhar, Nina, Eve Dawoud; Ted Polhemus; Paul Gorman; Gary Aspden; Nick Jensen. What We Wore: A People’s History of British Style. Prestel (2014). ISBN 978-3-7913-4898-8.
