= Independent Schools Football Association =

Governing body of private schools football in UK

Independent Schools Football Association (ISFA) oversees football in independent schools in the United Kingdom. The ISFA is affiliated to the Football Association.

The chairman is current Headmaster of Hampton School Kevin Knibbs.

== History ==
Dick Sale, headmaster of Brentwood School and public school representative on the F.A. Council, formed the Public Schools Football Association and was its first chairman. The name was changed to the Independent Schools FA in 1986 under the chairmanship of Chris Saunders, headmaster of Eastbourne College and later Lancing College. In 2005, the Independent Schools Football Association for Girls division was formed. The current chairman is the third person to hold that post.

== Boodles ISFA Cup ==
The association organises the Boodles ISFA Cup, a knockout competition among ISFA member schools. The final usually takes place at a Football League ground, with recent finals taking place at the Stadium MK, home ground of Milton Keynes Dons.

Previous winners are:

Year	Winners	Runners-up	Score
1992–93	Forest School	Charterhouse School	2–2 [aet, pens]
1993–94	The King's School, Chester	Ardingly College	3–1
1994–95	St Bede's College, Manchester	Ardingly College	3–2 [aet]
1995–96	QEGS Blackburn	Bury Grammar School	1–0
1996–97	Lancing College	Bolton School	2–1
1997–98	Ardingly College	Bolton School	3–1
1998–99	Hampton School	Wolverhampton Grammar School	2–1
1999–00	Shrewsbury School	Charterhouse School	1–0
2000–01	QEGS Blackburn	Brentwood School	2–1
2001–02	Brentwood School	St Bede's College, Manchester	1–1 [aet, pens]
2002–03	Bolton School	Bradfield College	1–0
2003–04	QEGS Blackburn	Millfield	2–2 [aet, pens]
2004–05	Millfield	Hampton School	3–1
2005–06	The King's School, Chester	Millfield	3–1
2006–07	Hampton School	Charterhouse School	1–1 [aet, pens]
2007–08	Charterhouse School	Millfield	0–0 [aet, pens]
2008–09	Millfield	Hampton School	2–0
2009–10	Shrewsbury School	Repton School	3–0
2010–11	Charterhouse School	Eton College	2–0
2011–12	Hampton School	Millfield	2–1
2012–13	Millfield	Alleyn's School	2–0
2013–14	Millfield	Bradfield College	6–1
2014–15	Ardingly College	Hampton School	4–1
2015–16	Ardingly College	Bradfield College	1–0 [aet]
2016–17	Royal Russell School	Millfield School	2–1
2017–18	Bradfield College	Repton	3–1
2018–19	Royal Russell School	Millfield School	2–1
2019–20	Millfield School	Queen Ethelburga's Collegiate	5–4 [aet]
2021–22	Bradfield College	Rossall School	4–0
2022–23	Royal Russell School	Charterhouse School	1–0
2023–24	Bradfield College	Cheadle Hulme	3–2
2024–25	Bradfield College	Shrewsbury School	2–0
2025–26	Aldenham School	Bradfield College	3-2 [aet]

Note that the 2020–21 tournament was not played due to the COVID-19 pandemic.

== ISFA U15 Cup ==
In season 2007–08 two new cup competitions were introduced: the Investec ISFA Under-15 Cup and the Investec ISFA U13 Cup. The finals for both of these competitions have so far taken place at Burton Albion F.C.

Investec ISFA Under-15 Cup Winners:

Year	Winner	Runners-up
2007–08	Manchester Grammar School	Latymer Upper School
2008–09	Manchester Grammar School	Eton College
2009–10	Brentwood School	Repton School
2010–11	Whitgift School	Bolton School
2011–12	Hampton School	Bolton School
2012–13	Whitgift School	Brentwood School
2013–14	Ardingly College	Manchester Grammar School
2014–15	Hampton School	Manchester Grammar School
2015–16	Millfield	Brentwood School
2016–17	Whitgift School	Forest School
2017–18	Aldenham School	Cheadle Hulme School
2018–19	Aldenham School	Royal Russell School
2021–22	Cheadle Hulme School	Eton College
2022–23	Dulwich College	Moorland School

Note that the Final (Royal Russell School vs Whitgift School) of the 2019–20 tournament and the whole of the 2020–21 tournament were not played due to the COVID-19 pandemic.

== Other Competitions ==
Investec ISFA Under-13 Cup Winners:

Year	Winner	Runners-up
2007–08	Brentwood School	King's School, Chester
2008–09	The Grange School	Alleyn's School
2009–10	Bolton School	Forest School
2010–11	Whitgift School	Hampton School
2011–12	Whitgift School	Brentwood School
2012–13	Whitgift School	Priory
2013–14	Whitgift School	Chigwell School
2014–15	Whitgift School	City of London School
2015–16	Whitgift School	Bury Grammar School
2016–17	Moorland School	Whitgift School
2017–18	Whitgift School	Lochinver House School
2018–19	Whitgift School	Alleyn's School
2021–22	Dulwich College	Manchester Grammar School
2022–23	Aldenham School	Dulwich College

Note that the Final (Aldenham School vs Manchester Grammar School) of the 2019–20 tournament and the whole of the 2020–21 tournament were not played due to the COVID-19 pandemic.

The organisation also organises football in Independent Schools for Girls, and runs an Under 18 Cup competition for girls.

ISFA Under-18 Girls Cup winners:

Year	Winner	Runners-up
2007–08	ACS Cobham	Wellingborough School
2008–09	Repton School	ACS Cobham
2009–10	St. Bede's School	Stamford High School
2010–11	ACS Cobham	Stamford High School
2011–12	Stamford High School	ACS Cobham
2012–13	ACS Cobham	Stamford High School
2013–14	King's College, Taunton	Sevenoaks
2014–15	Oakham School	ACS Cobham

== ISFA Accredited Competitions ==
ISFA is accredited with these competitions:

The HUDL Independent Schools League is a league consisting of the following schools: Ardingly College, Bede's School, Bradfield College, Hampton School, Millfield School, Repton School, Royal Russel School, Shrewsbury School.

The Southern Independent Schools Lent Term League is a league run in the Lent Term consisting of the following schools: Berkhamsted School, Epsom College, Haileybury School, Harrow School, Radley College, St John's, Leatherhead, St Paul's School, Tonbridge School.

The London Independent Schools Cup is a knockout competition between 1st and 2nd XI sides from select independent schools based in London; the final 32 is the first round of the cup.

Other competitions include: Birkdale U13 North-East Tournament, Mercian Independent Schools League, South-East Girls U15 Tournament, Thames Valley League, Barry Burns Northern Eights, Thomas' Five-A-Side Football Tournaments, etc.

== Representative teams ==
ISFA also organises teams to represent Independent Schools in England at Under-14, Under-15, Under-16 and Under-18 levels. The Under-18 and Under-16 sides undertake an annual overseas tour, as well as numerous fixtures, including an annual Under-18 fixture against Scotland Independent Schools. The Under-14 and Under-15 sides play matches mainly against academy teams from various English professional clubs.

== Notable former players ==
- Olly Lee – Brentwood School
- Elliot Lee – Brentwood School
- Frank Lampard – Brentwood School
- Max Kretzschmar – Hampton School
- James Beattie – QEGS Blackburn
- Quinton Fortune – Forest School
- Nedum Onuoha – Hulme Grammar School
- Dan Harding – St. Bede's School, Hailsham
- Neil Mellor – St Bede's College, Manchester
- Adam Virgo – Ardingly College
- Andy Frampton – Lancing College
- Neil Harris – Brentwood School
- Chris Porter – QEGS Blackburn
- Robin Shroot – Alleyn's School
- Lawrie Wilson – Millfield
- Fraser Forster – Royal Grammar School, Newcastle
- Jordan Spence – Chigwell School
- Josh O'Keefe – QEGS Blackburn
- Frank Fielding – QEGS Blackburn
- Will Hughes – Repton School
- Johnny Gorman – Repton School
- Duncan Watmore – Cheadle Hulme
- Solomon March – St. Bede's School, Hailsham
