= William Kelsey Fry =

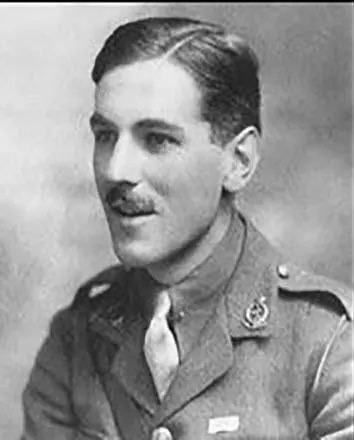
William Kelsey Fry during World War I

Sir William Kelsey Fry (18 March 1889–26 October 1963) was a British dental surgeon who, with Harold Gillies, was an important figure in the development of oral and maxillofacial surgery during World War I.

He was born in 1889 in Greenwich, the son of Kate née Kelsey and Edmund Fry, a stone merchant. He was educated at Hurstpierpoint College and in 1908 entered Guy's Hospital, obtaining the M.R.C.S. and L.R.C.P. in 1912 and L.D.S. in 1913. On qualifying as a doctor and a dental surgeon in 1914 he joined the Royal Army Medical Corps (RAMC) and served in World War I as a regimental medical officer attached to the Royal Welch Fusiliers. Fry landed in France with the 7th Division in October 1914. He was wounded during the Battle of Festubert in May 1915 while carrying out his work under heavy fire and was awarded the Military Cross. In 1916 as a Captain he married Hannah Ruby Preston. He was wounded again on 26 August 1916. Fry spent two years at the Front and tended the wounded at Neuve Chapelle, Aubers Ridge, Festubert and the Somme.

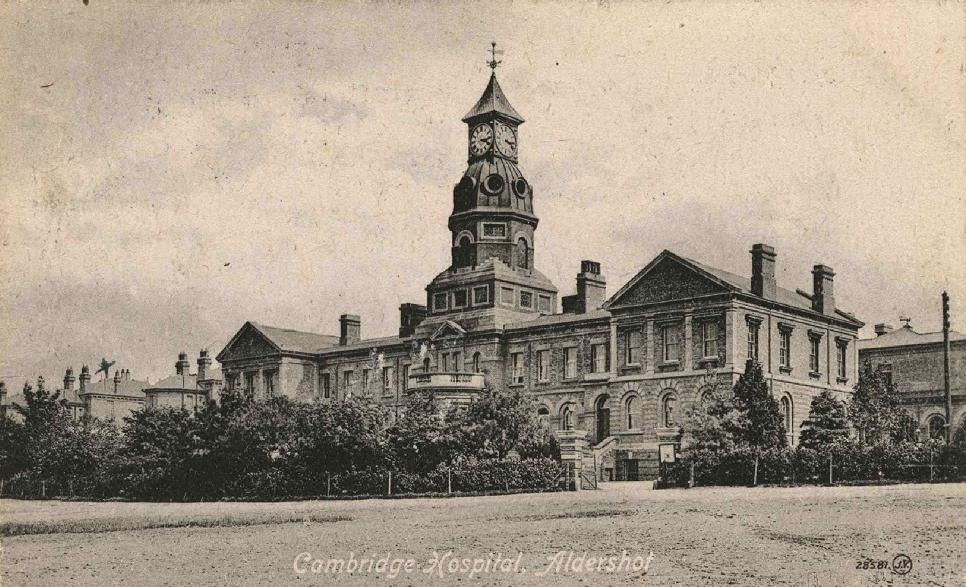
The former Cambridge Military Hospital in Aldershot in Hampshire

Later he worked with Harold Gillies, initially at the Cambridge Military Hospital in Aldershot in 1916 where they pioneered the development of oral and maxillofacial surgery. At Aldershot Gillies and Fry put together a multidisciplinary team that treated both bony and soft tissue elements in the development of this new medical specialty. In 1917 they continued this work at the newly established Queen Mary's Hospital in Sidcup, Fry's experience at this time led to his essay on "Treatment of injuries of the jaws" which was awarded the Cartwright Prize of the Royal College of Surgeons of England.

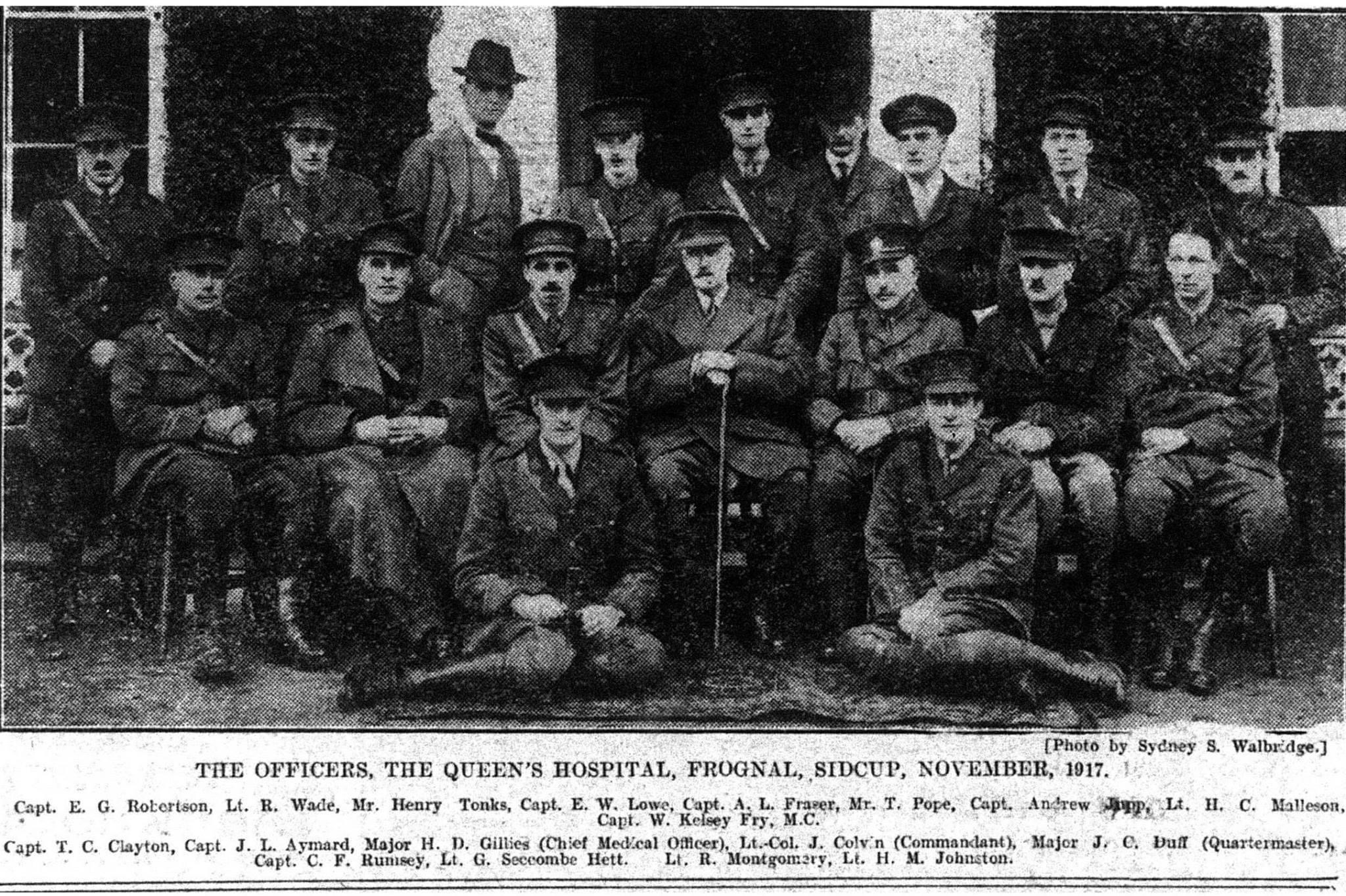
Group photograph at Queen Mary's Hospital in Sidcup (1917). Harold Gillies (seated third from left), Henry Tonks (standing third from left), and William Kelsey Fry (standing extreme right)

As plastic surgery was a newly emerging medical discipline, Harold Gillies realised that teamwork was important in facial reconstruction and he therefore worked closely with the dental surgeons. At Sidcup Fry led the team of dentists and dental technicians. He and his team had "an active role in designing the inventive dental prostheses that returned masticatory function to patients with jaw injuries." Under the direction of Fry and Gillies Queen Mary's Hospital became an international centre for training surgeons in plastic and oral surgery.

Fry returned to Guy's Hospital as a lecturer after WWI where he became established as one of the leading oral surgeons in the country. Here he developed innovative treatment techniques for patients with cleft palates and other facial deformities. He became President of the British Dental Association and his medical textbook The Dental Treatment of Maxillofacial Injuries (1942) became a leading text in the field.

During World War II Fry worked with Archibald McIndoe at the maxillofacial and plastic unit of the Queen Victoria Hospital in East Grinstead. During this time Fry was a civilian consultant in dental surgery in the E.M.S., and had a leading role in establishing treatment centres for maxillo-facial injuries throughout the United Kingdom. He was appointed a civilian consultant to the Royal Air Force and the Ministry of Health. In 1948 he was awarded the diploma FDS by the Royal College of Surgeons of England, and from that year until his death Fry was a member of the Board of Faculty of Dental Surgery there, and was Dean of the Faculty (1950-53). On his retirement from Guy's Hospital in 1949 he became a Lecturer in Oral Surgery at the Eastman Dental Institute. He was appointed CBE in 1948 and was knighted in 1951. Fry became a Fellow of the Royal College of Surgeons of England in 1953, and in 1955 he was made a D.Sc by McGill University. Until just before his death Fry served as a member of the Board of Governors of Guy's Hospital and the S.E. Metropolitan Regional Hospital Board. In his later years he was an enthusiastic golfer.

Sir William Kelsey Fry died at his home in Bexhill-on-Sea in 1963 leaving a widow, Lady Hannah Ruby Fry (1891-1979), and a son, Ian Kelsey Fry (1923-2018), who had followed him into the medical profession.

Kelsey Fry Road in Gun Hill Park in Aldershot is named to commemorate him.
