= Arnold Pomfret =

English cricketer, ophthalmologist, and Royal Navy officer

Surgeon Rear-Admiral Arnold Pomfret CB OBE
- Born: 1 June 1900; Blackpool, Lancashire, England
- Died: 3 April 1984 (aged 83); Taunton, Somerset, England
- Military career
- Allegiance: United Kingdom
- Branch: Royal Navy
- Service years: 1922–1923; 1926–1957
- Rank: Surgeon Rear-Admiral
- Conflicts: Second World War
- Awards: Order of the Bath; Order of the British Empire

Surgeon Rear-Admiral Arnold Ashworth Pomfret CB OBE (1 June 1900 – 3 April 1984) was an English first-class cricketer, ophthalmologist and Royal Navy officer.

== Life ==
The son of John Pomfret of Blackburn, Lancashire, he was educated at Blackburn Grammar School. He studied at Manchester University, graduating there in 1922, and the University of Oxford. He joined the Royal Navy in 1923 as a Surgeon Lieutenant on a short service commission. After leaving the navy to concentrate on his medical training, Pomfret rejoined as a Surgeon Lieutenant in August 1926. He was one of the first naval medical officers to specialise in ophthalmology and was the first to undertake major eye surgery.

Pomfret became a Surgeon Lieutenant Commander in 1929, and worked at the Royal Naval Hospital, Simon's Town from 1931 to 1934. He became a Surgeon Commander in August 1934 and in 1940 he was medical officer in charge of the Royal Navy Sick Quarters on Liugong Island, Wei Hai Wei, and in that capacity received a Japanese military delegation of the Wei Hai Wei occupying forces. Pomfret subsequently withdrew from Wei Hai Wei along with the remainder of British forces following the occupation. The following year he was made an OBE in the 1941 New Year Honours and was promoted to the rank of Surgeon Captain in June 1944.

He was appointed an Honorary Surgeon to the Queen in November 1953, a capacity he served in until his retirement from active service in October 1957. Pomfret retired with the rank of Surgeon Rear-Admiral, having been promoted to that rank in October 1954. He was made a Companion to the Order of the Bath in the 1957 Birthday Honours. Pomfret retired to Taunton, where he died in April 1984.

== Cricket ==
Pomfret played first-class cricket for the Royal Navy, for which he is recorded playing in 1929. His three appearances in 1929 came against the Marylebone Cricket Club (MCC), the British Army and the Royal Air Force. Against the MCC he took a five wicket haul, with figures of 6 for 39 in the MCC second-innings, which contributed to a 23 runs victory for the Royal Navy, despite having been asked to follow-on from their first-innings. A right-arm fast-medium bowler, he ended his brief first-class career with 12 wickets at an average of 24.25.

== Family ==
Pomfret married in 1928 Carlene Blundstone: they had a son and two daughters. Their daughter Jocelyn married Alexander Crawford Simpson Boswell in 1956. Carlene Pomfret's memoir Cabin Trunks & Far Horizons was published in 1991.
