= Ernest Marshall Cowell =

British military officer and surgeon (1886–1971)

Major-General Sir Ernest Marshall Cowell KBE CB DSO TD DL FRCS
- Born: 24 February 1886; Steyning, Sussex, England
- Died: 26 February 1971 (aged 85) Guernsey
- Allegiance: United Kingdom
- Branch: British Army
- Service years: 1914–1946
- Rank: Major-General
- Conflicts: World War I World War II
- Education: University of London (MD)
- Spouse: Dorothy Elizabeth Miller (1912–1962; her death)
- Children: 3 (including Roberta Cowell)

Major-General Sir Ernest Marshall Cowell KBE CB DSO TD DL FRCS (24 February 1886 – 26 February 1971) was a British military officer and surgeon. He served in the Royal Army Medical Corps during World War I and World War II and served as the director of medical services for the Allied Forces in North Africa from 1942 to 1944. He was appointed Honorary Surgeon to the King in 1944.

== Early life and education ==
Cowell was born on 24 February 1886. He was the son of Jasper Cowell of Steyning and Alice Marshall.

He was educated at Steyning Grammar School and earned his medical degree at the University of London's medical school in 1909.

== Career ==
=== Military service ===
From 1914 to 1918, during World War I, Cowell served in the Royal Army Medical Corps. On 15 June 1920, he was promoted to the rank of lieutenant colonel. On 30 April 1932, he was promoted to the rank of colonel. From 1934 to 1940, he served as the director of medical services for the 44th (Home Counties) Division.

From 1939 to 1946, during World War II, he served again in the Royal Army Medical Corps. Cowell was appointed as acting major general on 11 November 1942. A year later, on 11 November 1943, he was appointed as temporary major general. He relinquished his temporary rank of major general on 15 January 1945 and received an official promotion to the rank of major general on 11 April 1945. From 1942 to 1944, he served as the director of medical services for the Allied Forces in North Africa.

== Medical practice ==
Cowell became a Fellow of the Royal College of Surgeons in 1911.

He was hired as a surgeon at the Croydon General Infirmary in 1922 and practised medicine in Croydon for the remainder of his medical career. He became a surgeon at Mayday Hospital in 1938.

He served as chairman of the Croydon Division of the British Medical Association from 1926 to 1927 and as chairman of the Surrey branch from 1936 to 1938.

In 1944, he was appointed as an honorary surgeon to King George VI, a position in the Royal Household.

Cowell retired from medicine in 1965.

== Honours ==
Cowell was awarded the Distinguished Service Order in 1918. He was created a Commander of the Most Excellent Order of the British Empire in the 1939 Birthday Honours. During the 1940 Birthday Honours, he was made a Companion of the Most Honourable Order of Bath. Cowell was knighted, as a Knight Commander of the Order of the British Empire, during the 1944 Birthday Honours.

In 1945 he became a Freeman of Croydon and, in 1953, he became a Freeman of the City of London in the Company of Coopers. He was also a Deputy Lieutenant for Surrey.

== Personal life ==
Cowell married Dorothy Elizabeth Miller, daughter of Arthur Miller ISO, in Chipping Barnet, Hertfordshire in 1912. They had three children, including Roberta Cowell. His wife died in 1962 and, in 1966, he married his second wife, Mary.

He died on 26 February 1971 in Guernsey.
