= Ralph Millard =

American plastic surgeon (1919–2011)

- Education: Yale University; Harvard Medical School
- Occupation: Plastic Surgeon

David Ralph Millard, Jr. (June 4, 1919 – June 19, 2011) was an American plastic surgeon who developed several techniques used in cleft lip and cleft palate surgeries. He also popularized the double eyelid surgery or "Asian blepharoplasty" to "deorientalize" patients' faces while stationed in South Korea during the Korean War. He was chief of the Division of Plastic Surgery at Miller School of Medicine of the University of Miami for 28 years, and maintained a private practice in Miami.

== Early life ==
Millard was born at Barnes Hospital, St. Louis, Missouri. He attended the Asheville School in Asheville, North Carolina. He went on to Yale University, where he was on the football and boxing teams. After graduating from Yale in 1941, he went on to graduate from Harvard Medical School in 1944. Then he interned in pediatric surgery at Boston Children's Hospital.

A United States Navy veteran, he served stateside in World War II but in Korea during the Korean War, where he became interested in local children with cleft lips. After decommissioning from the Navy, he spent a year as a surgical resident at Vanderbilt University.

== The Millard repair procedure ==
The rotation-advancement procedure for cleft lip repair, also known as the Millard repair, is designed to create a softer, more natural-looking lip. Surgery performed prior to the Millard procedure involved pulling both sides of the cleft lip together resulting in a tightly closed upper lip. The Millard procedure rotates the tissue and creates a Z-shaped scar instead. The "Z" shape gives the tissue more elasticity, resulting in greater flexibility and restoration of the Cupid's bow.

The blue lines indicate incisions.

Movement of the flaps; flap A is moved between B and C. C is rotated slightly while B is pushed down. Note how the cupid's bow is created.

== Recognition ==
In 2000, Millard was nominated as one of "10 Plastic Surgeons of the Millennium" by the American Society of Plastic Surgeons. In the April 2000 issue of Plastic Surgery News, Millard was described as "the most brilliant and creative plastic surgeon we have alive. His work and publications speak for themselves." He is considered to be one of the founders of modern reconstructive facial surgery.

== Personal life ==
Millard had two sons,(Duke and Bond) a daughter (Meleney), and six grandchildren (Davey, Lindsey, Blake, Ryan, Jennifer, and Kelsey).

== Bibliography ==
- Gillies HD, Millard DR. The Principles and Art of Plastic Surgery. Butterworth. 1958.
  - Reviews: , , .
- Millard R, Pigott R, Zies P. Free skin grafting of full-thickness defects of abdominal wall. Plast Reconstr Surg. 1969
- Millard, DR, Total reconstructive rhinoplasty and a missing link. Plast. Reconstruct Surg 37:167-171, 1966.

== See also ==
- The paramedian forehead flap
