= Cambridge Military Hospital =

Former hospital in England

Coordinates: 51.253°N 0.757°W

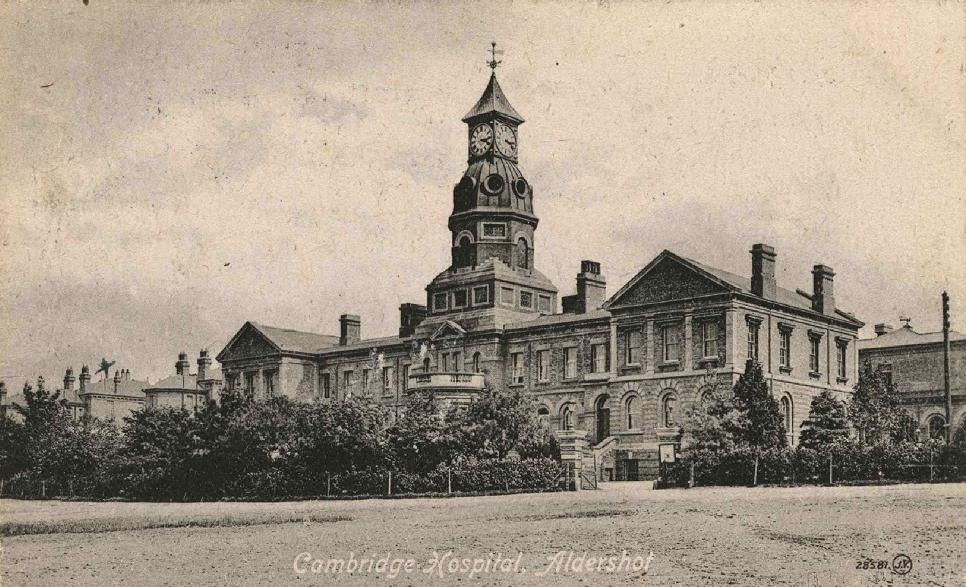
- Cambridge Military Hospital, 1891.
- Active: 1879–1996
- Country: United Kingdom
- Branch: British Army
- Type: Medical Care
- Role: Hospital
- Garrison/HQ: Aldershot, Hampshire

Cambridge Military Hospital was a hospital completed in 1879 in Aldershot Garrison, Hampshire, England which served the various British Army camps there. During World War I, the Cambridge Hospital was the first base hospital to receive casualties directly from the Western Front. It was also the first place where plastic surgery was performed in the British Empire under Harold Gillies. It is now the residential estate Gun Hill Park.

== Earlier hospitals in Aldershot ==
The first military hospital in Aldershot was a wooden hutted structure, near the garrison church. It was established for lunatics and infectious diseases as well as providing some family accommodation.

Secondly there was the Union Hospital at Wellington Lines. It was converted in the 1860s from a workhouse, the Union Poor House, which had originally been a private residence. It was small, but for the time, well-equipped. It closed shortly after the opening of the Cambridge Hospital.

Thirdly there was the Connaught Hospital at Marlborough Lines. Established in the second half of the 19th century, it was named after Prince Arthur, Duke of Connaught and Strathearn and was for a while a specialist venereal disease hospital for 300 men. It was later a dental facility before it closed on 29 September 1973.

== The new hospital ==
The Cambridge Military Hospital, built by Messrs Martin Wells and Co. of Aldershot, was located at Stanhope Lines; the design was based on that of the Royal Herbert Hospital in Woolwich. It cost £45,000, and could accommodate 450 patients. It was named after Prince George, Duke of Cambridge and opened on 18 July 1879. The Louise Margaret Hospital for military wives and children was opened alongside in 1897.

The hospital has been extended over the years. By 1893 two new angled pavilion wards were added at the ends of the main through corridor. Since 1931 many additions and alterations have been made, compromising the elegant initial design.

In the First World War, the Cambridge Hospital was the first base hospital to receive casualties directly from the Western Front. The Cambridge Hospital was also the first place where plastic surgery was performed in the British Empire. Captain Gillies (later Sir Harold Gillies), met Hippolyte Morestin, while on leave in Paris in 1915. Morestin was reconstructing faces in the Val-de-Grace Hospital in Paris. Gillies fell in love with the work, and at the end of 1915 was sent back from France to start a Plastic Unit in the Cambridge Hospital. He was assisted in this work by the dental surgeon William Kelsey Fry, who reconstructed jaws. The doctor and artist Henry Tonks worked for Harold Gillies producing pastel drawings recording facial injury cases at the Cambridge Military Hospital and the Queen's Hospital, Sidcup

After the Second World War, with the decline in importance of Britain's military commitments, civilians were admitted to the hospital. It pioneered the supply of portable operating theatres and supplies for frontline duties. The hospital also contained the Army Chest Unit.

The hospital was closed on 2 February 1996 due to the high cost of running the old building as well as the discovery of asbestos in the walls. In 2014 permission was granted for the hospital to be converted to provide housing. Subsequently, the 12-acre (4.9 ha) site was acquired by Weston Homes for conversion into residential accommodation, as part of the wider 370-acre (150 ha) Aldershot Urban Extension scheme. The main building is grade II listed.

Nearby at the top of Gun Hill is the RAMC Memorial which commemorates the 314 men of the Royal Army Medical Corps who lost their lives in the Boer War of 1899 to 1902.

== Gun Hill Park ==
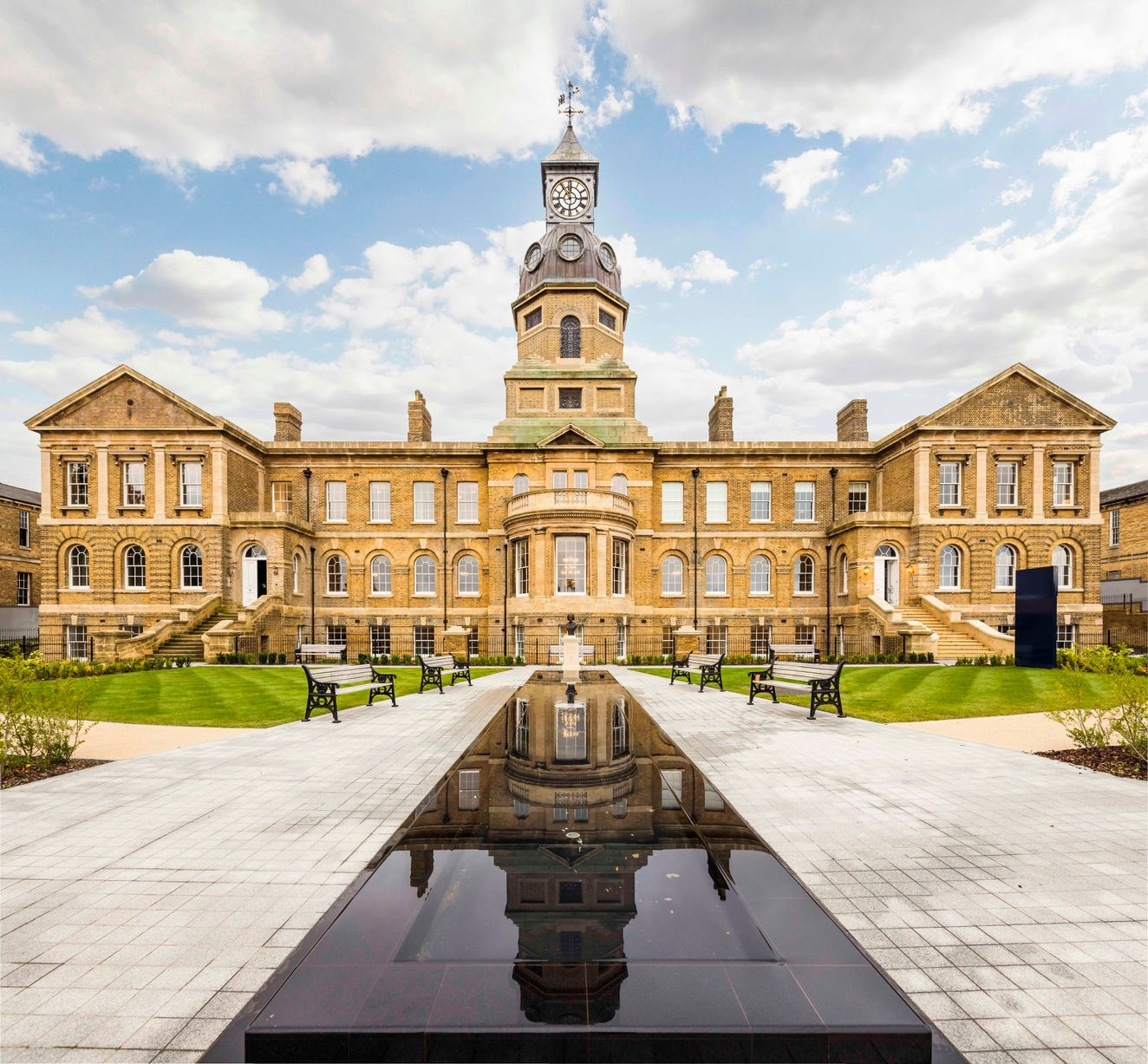
Gun Hill Park in 2021

The Grade II listed former hospital building and the 12 acre complex of Victorian and Edwardian era support buildings around it is being redeveloped at a cost of £60 million for residential use by Weston Homes as Gun Hill Park, part of the newly created Wellesley Estate in Aldershot. Acquired by Weston Homes in May 2019, the main building of 1879 has been converted to include 74 apartments with large communal foyers and spaces in addition to a large penthouse incorporating the building's clock tower. Gun Hill Park incorporates a number of new-build houses with private gardens and set in landscaped grounds.

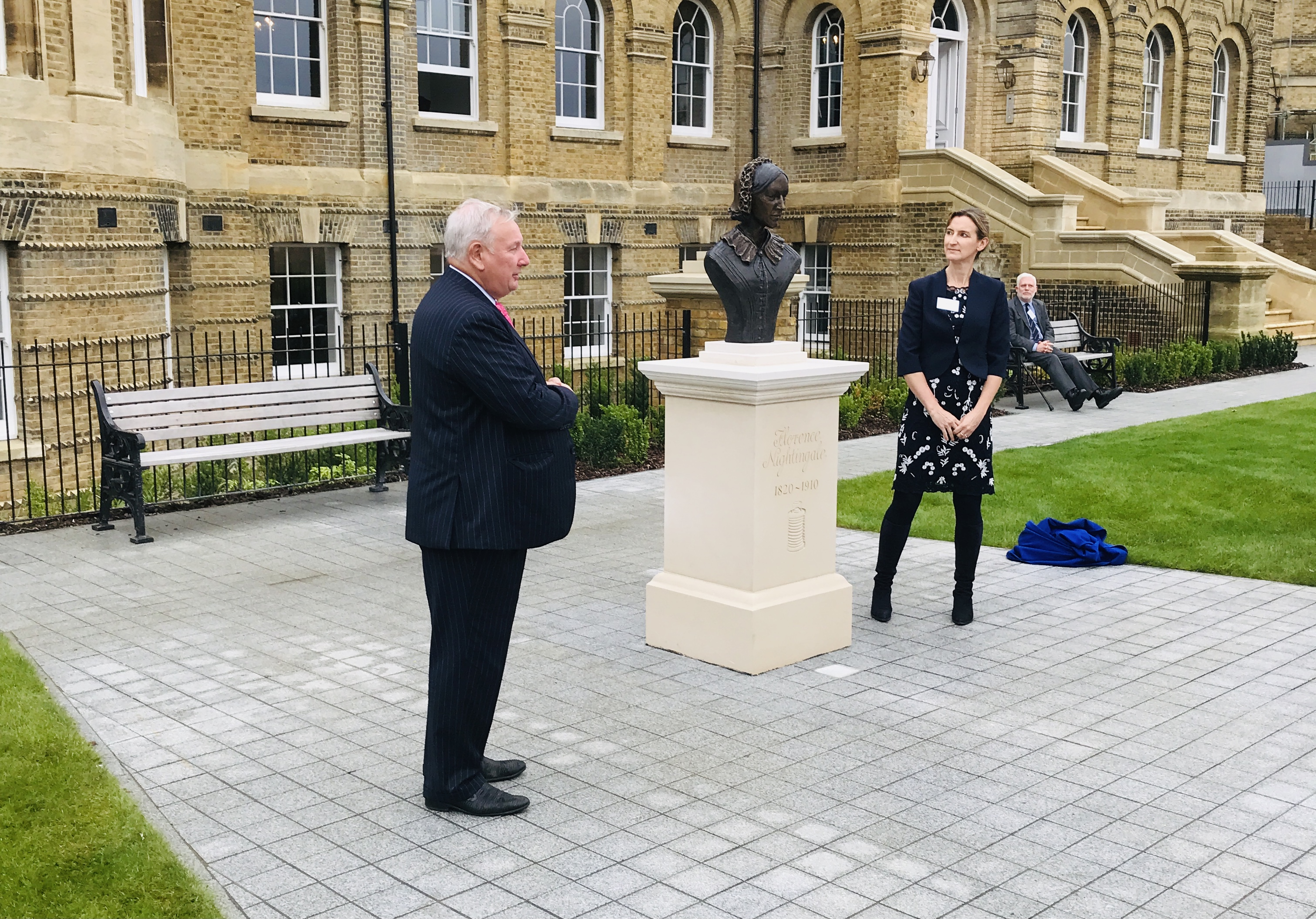
Bob Weston, CEO of Weston Homes and sculptor Amy Goodman unveil the bust of Florence Nightingale (October 2021)

In October 2021 a bronze bust of Florence Nightingale by Hampshire-based sculptor Amy Goodman was unveiled in front of the hospital building by Goodman and Bob Weston, CEO of Weston Homes. For the bust, Goodman was inspired by books about Nightingale's life and referred to photographs taken of her by William Edward Kilburn in about 1856 and that taken by Claudius Erskine Goodman in about 1858. The bust sits on a plinth of Portland stone, often used for memorials and commemorative sculpture. The inscription was hand-carved by the memorial artist Maya Martin.

== See also ==
- List of hospitals in England
