= Hippolyte Morestin =

French surgeon (1869–1919)

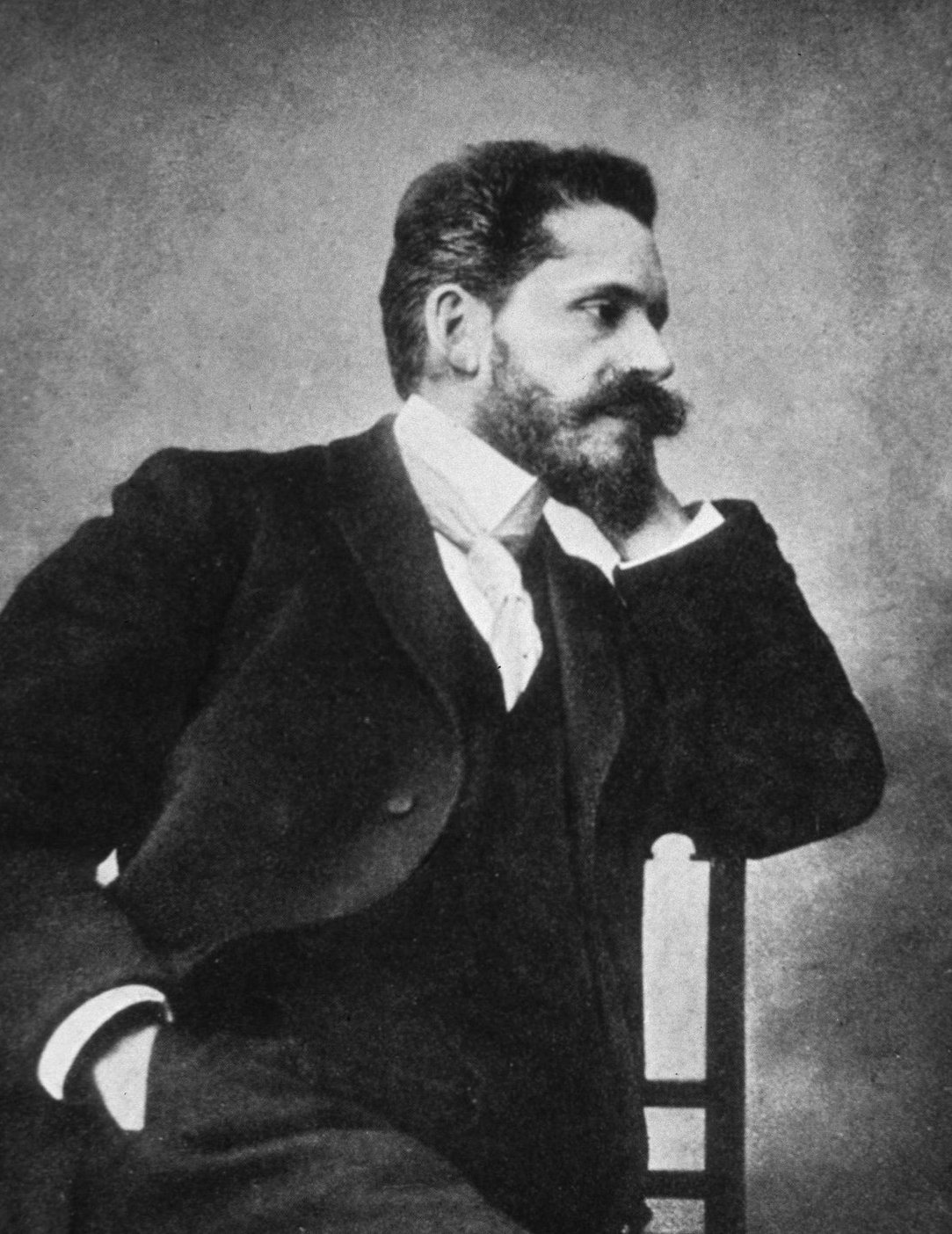

Hippolyte Morestin (1 September 1869 – 12 February 1919) was a French surgeon, and associate professor of anatomy at the University of Paris. He was one of the founders of cosmetic surgery. He was dubbed "The Father of the Mouths" after his breakthroughs in oral and maxillofacial surgery.

== Early life and education ==
Morestin was born at Basse-Pointe, a commune in the French overseas department of Martinique. His family were Béké (white creoles). His father Charles Amédée Morestin (d. 1902) was a prominent doctor who influenced both Hippolyte and his younger brother Amédée to study medicine, sending Morestin and his older brother to Paris to study at Lycée Louis-le-Grand when Morestin was 14. Both Hippolyte and Amédée dedicated their doctoral theses, defended in Paris in 1894 and 1912, respectively, to their father, and the work of Amédée used observations by Hippolyte.

== Career ==
Morestin greatly influenced the British-New Zealand surgeon Harold Gillies, who met him on leave in Paris during the First World War. Gillies was attached to the British General Hospital in Rouen. Morestin, when Gillies was observing him, removed a tumor from a patient's face, and essentially "grafted" skin by cutting and rolling it from the patient's jaw onto the wound to allow the skin to regrow.

Morestin trained other doctors, including author Georges Duhamel, neurosurgeon Thierry de Martel, and cosmetic surgery pioneers Suzanne Noël, Léon Dufourmentel and Raymond Passot.

Morestin died from a pulmonary illness during the influenza epidemic of 1918–1919.

== Works ==
From 1892 and until his death in 1919 Morestin has published more than 600 scientific works including the following

- Des opérations qui se pratiquent par la voie sacrée. Steinheil. 1894.
- Bouche, pharynx, oesophage, larynx, trachée, corps thyroïde, cou, poitrine. Baillière. 1898.
- Chirurgie générale des articulations, Paris: Doin (1907)
- Chirurgie générale des articulations. Paris: Doin. 1907.
- Traitement du Cancer de la peau. 1908.
- Nouveau traité de chirurgie clinique et opératoire: Affections chirurgicales de la face : Tumeurs et malformations. J.B. Baillière et fils. 1911.
- Affections chirurgicales de la face: tumeurs et malformations. J.-B. Baillière. 1911.
