= Arthur Rainsford Mowlem =

British surgeon

Arthur Rainsford Mowlem

Arthur Rainsford Mowlem (1902–1986), born in New Zealand, was the youngest of the four plastic surgeons who practised in between the world wars in Britain. In 1936, he joined the London-based partnership that was started by Sir Harold Gillies and included Sir Archibald McIndoe and Thomas Pomfret Kilner. He continued to practise until his retirement in 1963. During the Second World War he was involved in early bone grafting and took part in early trials for penicillin at his unit in Hill End Hospital, St Albans.

== Early life ==
Mowlem was born on 21 December 1902 in Auckland, New Zealand, the son of Judge Arthur Mowlem, born in Melbourne in 1872, and Marion Beescroft. His father's branch of the Mowlem family moved to Australia in 1851.

Mowlem was educated at Auckland Grammar School. He studied at Auckland University College and then went to the University of Otago, Dunedin to study medicine. He graduated in 1924 in medicine. In 1926, he completed his registrar year at Auckland Hospital. He then went to Britain to continue his education, having worked his passage as a ship's surgeon.

== Career ==
He spent six months in general practice in Dorking, Surrey and then as a house surgeon at the Seamen's Hospital in Greenwich. He then became Resident Surgical Officer at Queen Mary's Hospital, Stratford, he achieved his FRSC in 1929. He became one of five Resident Surgical Officers at Hammersmith Hospital. In 1930, he was packing to go home to New Zealand when he was asked to undertake locum duties in a ward where Gillies had four beds. He was increasingly impressed with the potential of plastic surgery and began to assist Gillies. He later moved with Gillies to St James' Hospital, Balham and from 1933 till the outbreak of war he was an assistant medical officer in charge of the plastic unit at St Charles Hospital, Ladbroke Grove. In 1936, he became a consultant plastic surgeon at Middlesex Hospital and joined Gillies, Kilner and McIndoe in a partnership that lasted till the war in 1939.

Mowlem was deployed to Hill End Hospital, St Albans in 1939 at the outbreak of war.

After the second world war he returned to practise as both a NHS consultant, in private practice and as adviser in plastic surgery to the Ministry of Health. He continued at Hill End till it moved to Mount Vernon in 1953 where he continued his appointment whilst continuing his post with Middlesex Hospital where he had been a consultant since 1936.

He was appointed as the fourth president of the British Association of Plastic Surgeons in 1950. He was again appointed in 1959 for a second term to preside over the International Congress in Plastic Surgery in London. He was elected to a Hunterian Professorship by the Royal College of Surgeons in 1940 for his work in the field of bone grafting. He was also awarded an honorary Doctorate of Science by Trinity College, in Hartford, Connecticut and an honorary fellowship of the American Society of Plastic and Reconstructive Surgeons in recognition of his contribution to the profession.

His team at Hill End Hospital are seen as one of the first to introduce pin fixation methods to enable stabilization of fractures to the lower jaw.

== Mowlem Estate ==
Mowlem inherited Mowlem Estate in the town of Swanage on the Isle of Purbeck, given to his ancestor Durandas de Moulham by William the Conqueror, from his great Uncle John Ernest Mowlem (1868-1946). In 1990 the residue of the Mowlem Estate, was gifted to the town of Swanage by his grandson John Philip Mowlem.

== Later life ==
On retirement, he moved with his wife, Margaret, to Mijas, Andalusia, Spain. He died in Spain in 1986.
