= Julia Newton =

Medical doctor, professor

Julia L. Newton FRCP
- Citizenship: United Kingdom
- Scientific career
- Fields: Medicine; autonomic nervous system; primary biliary cirrhosis; POTS; ME/CFS
- Institutions: Newcastle University; Royal Victoria Infirmary

Julia L. Newton is Clinical Professor of Ageing and Medicine and Dean for Clinical Medicine at the School of Clinical Medical Sciences of Newcastle University in Newcastle upon Tyne, England. She is Director of MD Studies in the Faculty of Medical Sciences at Newcastle, and a member of the Pharmacogenomics & Complex Disease Genetics Research Group

She has worked on a wide range of research programmes. Her published research has been chiefly on the autonomic nervous system and its relation to disease especially in primary biliary cirrhosis. Newton's current interests are focused on how fatigue develops, and she proposes "postural orthostatic tachycardia syndrome" as significant in a subset of patients with ME/CFS. She has also worked to establish a link between autonomic dysfunction and muscle fatigue linking POTS with abnormal muscle PH and proton efflux.

== Biography ==
She received her MB, BS with Honours in 1990, and a Diploma of Medical Science: 1995. Her PhD was awarded in 1998. She obtained certification in CCST Geriatric Medicine and General Internal Medicine: 2000, and became a Fellow of the Royal College of Physicians FRCP(UK) in 2003.

She was previously

- 2000 to 2006: Consultant Geriatrician, Royal Victoria Infirmary, Newcastle and Honorary Senior Lecturer in General and Geriatric Medicine, University of Newcastle
- 1998 to 2000: Specialist Registrar in Geriatric and General Internal Medicine, Northern Deanery
- 1995 to 1998: Clinical Research Associate, Department of Physiological Sciences, University of Newcastle

== Memberships ==
- Secretary of the British Geriatric Society Special Interest Group in Gastroenterology and Nutrition.
- Fellow of the Royal College of Physicians

== Honours ==
- European Association for the Study of the Liver, Travel Fellowship, 2002.

== Selected scientific publications ==
- Jones, D.E.J.; Watt, F.E.; Grove, J.; Newton, J.L.; Daly, A.K.; Gregory, W.L.; Day, C.P.; James, O.F.W.; Bassendine, M.F. (1999). "Tumour necrosis factor-α promoter polymorphisms in primary biliary cirrhosis" (1999)". Journal of Hepatology. 30 (2): 232–236. doi:10.1016/s0168-8278(99)80067-1. PMID 10068101.
- Newton, J.L.; Allen, A.; Westley, B.R.; May, F.E.B. (2000). "The human trefoil peptide, TFF1, is present in different molecular forms that are intimately associated with mucus in normal stomach" (2000)". Gut. 46 (3): 312–320. doi:10.1136/gut.46.3.312. PMC 1727855. PMID 10673290.
- Newton, J.; Francis, R.; Prince, M.; James, O.; Bassendine, M.; Rawlings, D.; Jones, D. (2001). "Osteoporosis in primary biliary cirrhosis revisited" (2001)". Gut. 49 (2): 282–287. doi:10.1136/gut.49.2.282. PMC 1728382. PMID 11454807.
- Newton, J.; Brown, M.A.; Milicic, A.; Ackerman, H.; Darke, C.; Wilson, J.N.; Wordsworth, B.P.; Kwiatkowski, D. (2003). "The effect of HLA-DR on susceptibility to rheumatoid arthritis is influenced by the associated lymphotoxin α-tumor necrosis factor haplotype" (2003)". Arthritis and Rheumatism. 48 (1): 90–96. doi:10.1002/art.10719. PMID 12528108.
- Hoad, A.; Spickett, G.; Elliott, J.; Newton, J. (2008). "Postural orthostatic tachycardia syndrome is an under-recognized condition in chronic fatigue syndrome" (2008)". QJM. 101 (12): 961–965. doi:10.1093/qjmed/hcn123. PMID 18805903.
- Newton, JL (May 2008). "Fatigue in primary biliary cirrhosis". Clin Liver Dis. 12 (2): 367–83. doi:10.1016/j.cld.2008.02.010. PMID 18456186.
- Newton JL, Allen J, Kerr S, Jones DE. "Reduced heart rate variability and baroreflex sensitivity in primary biliary cirrhosis.
- Hollingsworth, K.G.; Newton, J.L.; Taylor, R.; McDonald, C.; Palmer, J.M.; Blamire, A.M.; Jones, D.E.J. (September 2008). "Pilot study of peripheral muscle function in primary biliary cirrhosis: potential implications for fatigue pathogenesis". Clin Gastroenterol Hepatol. 6 (9): 1041–8. doi:10.1016/j.cgh.2008.04.013. PMID 18691944.
- Legge, H.; Norton, M.; Newton, J.L. (September 2008). "Fatigue is significant in vasovagal syncope and is associated with autonomic symptoms". Europace. 10 (9): 1095–101. doi:10.1093/europace/eun164. PMID 18550509.
