= Gary Aspden =

English consultant

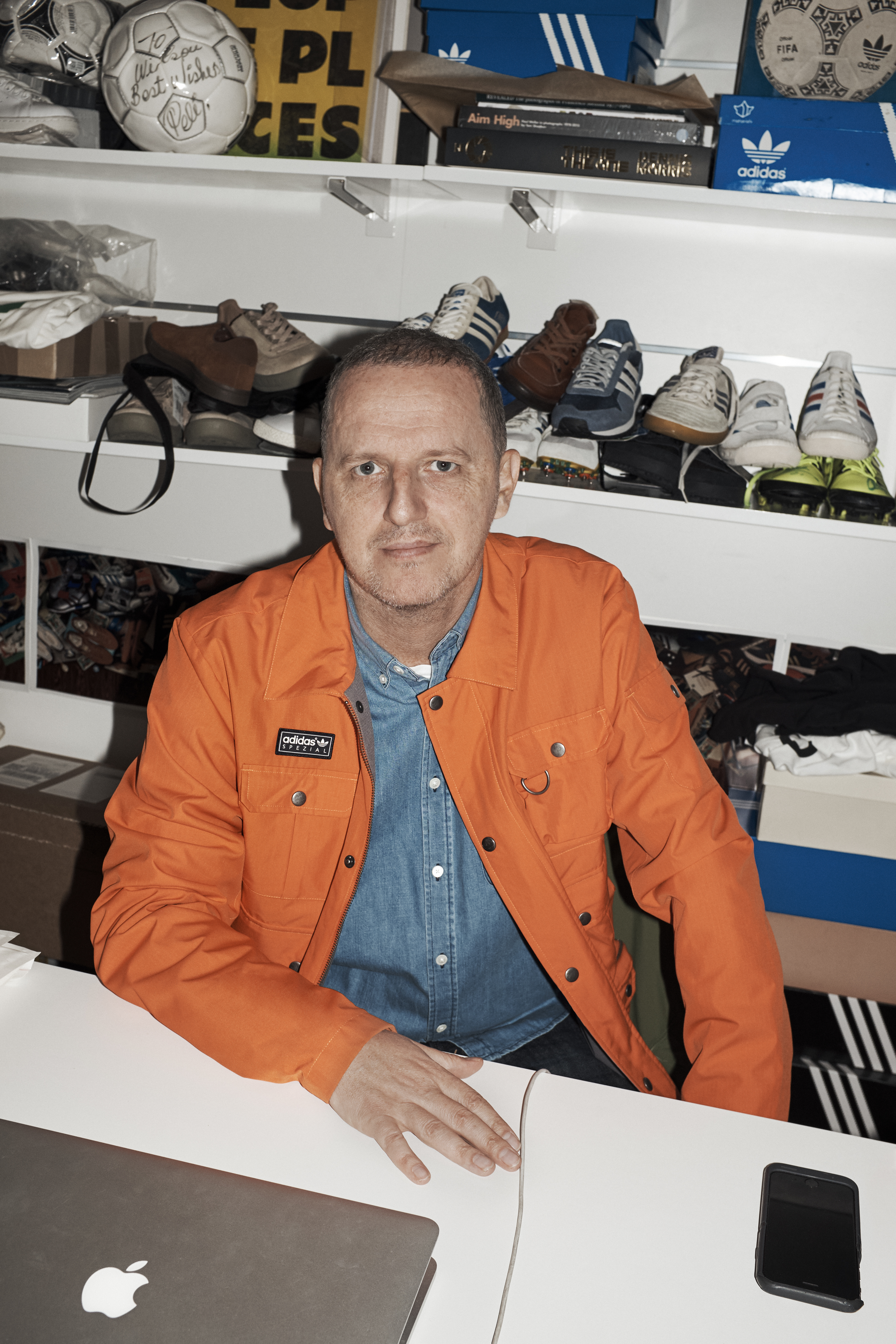
- Promotional shot for 'Office' magazine
- Born: Gary Lee Aspden; 27 September 1969 (age 57); Darwen, Lancashire, England
- Occupation: Fashion Designer
- Years active: 1990–present

Gary Lee Aspden (born 27 September 1969) is an English brand consultant and designer notable for his association with adidas. In 2014, He curated the adidas Spezial range after the head of adidas in the UK met with him and asked him who the brand should collaborate with. He proposed a range that was "somewhere between a sub-brand and a collaboration". Spezial has released a variety of trainers, apparel and accessories and has collaborated with artists such as Goldie, New Order, Liam Gallagher and Noel Gallagher.

He was born in Darwen, Lancashire, and attended Queen Elizabeth's Grammar School.

Aspden began collaborating with adidas in the 1990s, and gained prominence through successful outreach with celebrities while working for the entertainment marketing team. After nine years with adidas UK, he founded his own consulting agency, Darwen Design, but is the chief curator of adidas' Spezial line, which he created in 2013.

In October 2019, he held an exhibition of more than 1,000 trainers in Blackburn as part of the British Textile Biennial.

In July 2024, a section of Knott Street in Darwen, Lancashire, was renamed Gary Aspden Way.
