= British Association of Oral and Maxillofacial Surgeons =

- Abbreviation: BAOMS
- Formation: 1962
- Type: Professional body
- Legal status: Non-profit company and registered charity
- Purpose: Oral and maxillofacial surgery in the UK
- Headquarters: Lincoln's Inn Fields, London, WC2
- Region served: UK
- Members: 1400 medical professionals
- Main organ: BAOMS Council
- Parent organization: Royal College of Surgeons of England
- Affiliations: American Association of Oral and Maxillofacial Surgeons
- Website: BAOMS

The British Association of Oral and Maxillofacial Surgeons is the British medical association for oral and maxillofacial (mouth, jaws and face) surgeons - dual qualified surgeons, qualified in both medicine and dentistry.

== History ==
Oral and maxillofacial surgery developed as a surgical development in dentistry to treat servicemen injured in World War 2.

The British Association of Oral Surgeons was formed in February 1962. In 1985 the organisation changed to its present name. In 1994 the field of surgery was recognised as one of the nine surgical specialities.

Since 1995, to gain entrance to the Specialist Register for the Speciality of Oral & Maxillofacial Surgery, a surgeon must have qualifications in dentistry and medicine - be a registered dentist and registered medical practitioner and surgeon, according to the European Specialist Medical Qualification Order 1995. This recognition comes from both the General Medical Council and General Dental Council. Oral surgeons do not need to be a medical doctor.

It is a charity, and became a company limited by guarantee in 1997.

== Structure ==
It is based at the Royal College of Surgeons of England, north of the London School of Economics, in the London Borough of Camden.

== Function ==
It publishes the British Journal of Oral and Maxillofacial Surgery eight times a year.
