= Harold Gillies =

Father of plastic surgery (1882–1960)

Sir Harold Gillies CBE FRCS
- Born: Harold Delf Gillies; 17 June 1882; Dunedin, New Zealand
- Died: 10 September 1960 (aged 78); Marylebone, London, England
- Education: Gonville and Caius College, Cambridge
- Occupations: Otolaryngologist, plastic surgeon
- Years active: c. 1910–1960
- Known for: Plastic surgery, sex reassignment surgery
- Spouse: Kathleen Margaret Jackson (m. 1911)
- Relatives: Robert Gillies (father); Mick Gillies (son); Daniel Gillies (descendant); Archibald McIndoe (cousin)

Sir Harold Delf Gillies (17 June 1882 – 10 September 1960) was the father of modern plastic surgery for the techniques he devised to repair the faces of wounded soldiers returning from World War I. He initially trained as an otolaryngologist and subsequently developed reconstructive techniques that culminated in the advent of plastic surgery.

== Early life ==
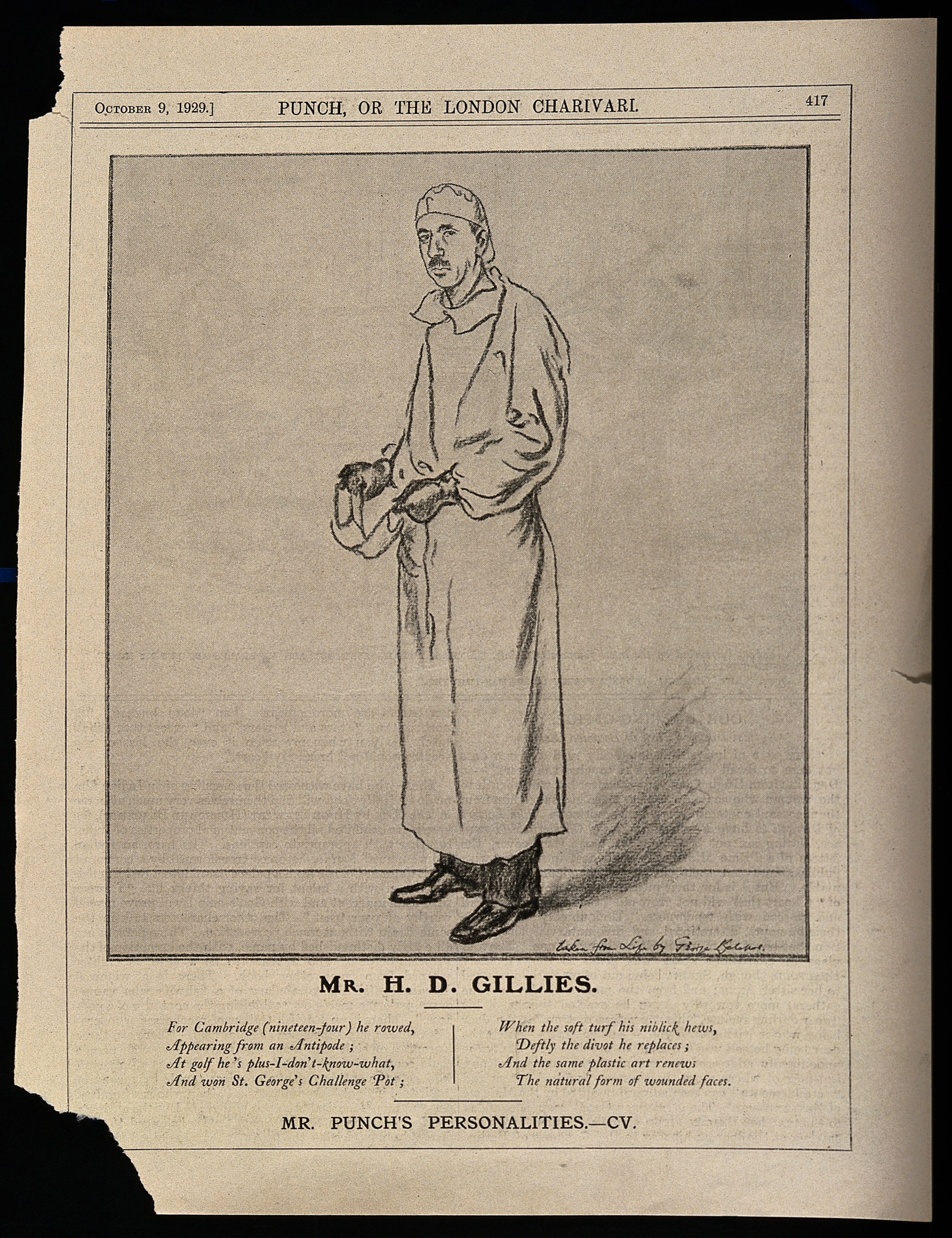
Gillies caricatured in Punch's Personalities by George Belcher, 1929

Gillies was born in Dunedin, New Zealand, the son of Member of Parliament in Otago, Robert Gillies. He attended Whanganui Collegiate School and studied medicine at Gonville and Caius College, Cambridge. Despite a stiff elbow from a childhood accident at home, he was an excellent sportsman. He was a golf blue in 1903, 1904 and 1905 and also a rowing blue, competing in the 1904 Boat Race. At Caius he became a freemason and rose to be Master of Caius Lodge. Gillies was a student at St Bartholomew's Hospital and won the Luther Holden Research Scholarship in 1910. He was also lecturer on plastic surgery in that medical school.

== Career ==
=== World War I ===
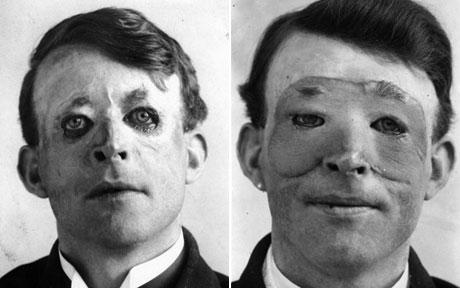
Walter Yeo, a sailor injured at the Battle of Jutland, is assumed to be the first person to receive plastic surgery in 1917. These photographs shows him immediately following (right) the flap surgery by Sir Harold Gillies, and after healing (left).

Following the outbreak of World War I he joined the Royal Army Medical Corps. Initially posted to Wimereux, near Boulogne, he acted as medical minder to a French-American dentist, Auguste Charles Valadier, who was not allowed to operate unsupervised but was attempting to develop jaw repair work. Gillies, eager after seeing Valadier experimenting with nascent skin graft techniques, then decided to leave for Paris, to meet the renowned oral surgeon Hippolyte Morestin. He saw him remove a tumour on a patient's face, and cover it with jaw skin taken from the patient. Gillies became enthusiastic about the work and on his return to England persuaded the army's chief surgeon, William Arbuthnot-Lane, that a facial injury ward should be established at the Cambridge Military Hospital, Aldershot.

The ward rapidly proved inadequate for the increasingly large number of patients in need of treatment, and a new hospital devoted to facial repairs was developed at Sidcup. The Queen's Hospital opened in June 1917, and with its convalescent units provided over 1,000 beds.

There, Gillies and his colleagues developed many innovative plastic surgery techniques; more than 11,000 operations were performed on over 5,000 men.

For his war services, Gillies was appointed an Officer of the Order of the British Empire in 1919, and promoted to Commander of the Order of the British Empire the following year. He was knighted in the 1930 Birthday Honours. Sir William Arbuthnot Lane, 1st Baronet, commented, "Better late than never".

=== Private practice ===
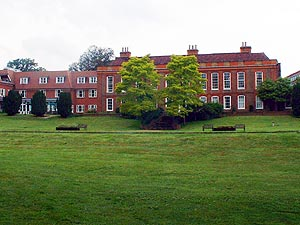
Frognal House, formerly Queen Mary's Hospital, in 2002

Between the wars Gillies developed a substantial private practice with Rainsford Mowlem, including many famous patients, and travelled extensively, lecturing, teaching and promoting the most advanced techniques worldwide.

In 1930 Gillies invited his cousin, Archibald McIndoe, to join the practice, and also suggested he apply for a post at St Bartholomew's Hospital. This was the point at which McIndoe became committed to plastic surgery, in which he too became pre-eminent.

=== World War II ===
During World War II Gillies acted as a consultant to the Ministry of Health, the RAF and the Admiralty. He organised plastic surgery units in various parts of Britain and inspired colleagues to do the same, including pioneering plastic surgeon Stewart Harrison who founded the plastic surgery unit at Wexham Park Hospital, Berkshire.

His own work continued at Rooksdown House, part of the Park Prewett Hospital, Basingstoke. During this period, and after the war, he trained many doctors from Commonwealth nations in plastic surgery.

Gillies also carried out lecture tours on plastic surgery across South America between 1941 and 1942 alongside British colour photographer Percy Hennell.

=== Pioneering gender-affirming surgery ===
Instead of retiring at the end of the Second World War Gillies had to keep working as he had insufficient savings.

In 1946, he and a colleague carried out one of the first male gender-affirming surgeries on Michael Dillon. In 1951, he and colleagues carried out one of the first modern female gender-affirming surgeries, on Roberta Cowell, using a flap technique, which became the standard for 40 years. On his work for Cowell and Dillon, Gillies remarked: “If it gives real happiness, that is the most that any surgeon or medicine can give.”

Gillies made a visit to New Zealand in 1956 after an absence of 51 years.

== Death ==
Gillies suffered a cerebral thrombosis at the age of 78 while undertaking a major operation on the damaged leg of an 18-year-old girl on 3 August 1960.

Gillies died on 10 September 1960 at The London Clinic, at 20 Devonshire Place, Marylebone. Despite earning an estimated £30,000 per year between the First and Second World Wars he left an estate of only £21,161.

== Personal life ==
Gillies married Kathleen Margaret Jackson on 9 November 1911, in London. They had four children.

Gillies was an amateur golfer. He played in the Amateur Championship every year from 1906 to 1931 and represented England in their annual match against Scotland in 1908, 1925, 1926 and 1927. He won the 1913 St. George's Grand Challenge Cup and was runner-up in the 1914 Golf Illustrated Gold Vase, behind Harold Hilton. He won the President's Putter in 1925.

For many years his home was at 71 Frognal, Hampstead, London. A blue plaque on the front of that house now commemorates his life and work.

In Cambridge, in 2015, Gonville and Caius College built twelve houses and named the road "Gillies Close" (postcode CB5 8ZD) in his honour.

Gillies Lane at Gun Hill Park in Aldershot, the former Cambridge Military Hospital, similarly commemorates him.

== Selected publications ==
- Gillies HD. Plastic Surgery of the Face. Henry Frowde. 1920, 1983. ISBN 0-906923-08-5
- Gillies HD, Millard DR. The Principles and Art of Plastic Surgery. Butterworth. 1958.

== Bibliography ==
External videos
- Q&A interview with Leslie Fitzharris on The Facemaker, 11 July 2022, C-SPAN

- Fitzharris, Lindsey (2022). The Facemaker: A Visionary Surgeon's Battle to Mend the Disfigured Soldiers of World War I (Hardback). New York: Farrar, Straus & Giroux. ISBN 9780374282301.
- Meikle, Murray C. (2013). Reconstructing Faces: The Art and Wartime Surgery of Gillies, Pickerill, McIndoe and Mowlem. Dunedin: Otago University Press. ISBN 978-1-877578-39-7. OCLC 870975648.
- Pound, Reginald (1964). Gillies: Surgeon Extraordinary (Hardback). Michael Joseph.
- Slevin, Tom (2008). "The Wound and the First World War: 'Cartesian' Surgeries to Embodied Being in Psychoanalysis, Electrification and Skin Grafting". Body and Society. 14 (2): 39–61. doi:10.1177/1357034X08090697. S2CID 144441785.
- Seymour, Miranda (23 July 2010). "Carrying on". The New York Times (Sunday Book Review). New York.

=== Reviews ===
- Davis, A. D. (1957). "The Principles and Art of Plastic Surgery". California Medicine. 87 (1): 67. PMC 1512094.
