= Passing (gender) =

Ability to be perceived as the gender one identifies as

In the context of gender, passing is someone being perceived as a gender they identify as or are attempting to be seen as, especially when that is not their sex assigned at birth. Historically, this was common among women who served in occupations from which women were ordinarily prohibited, such as in combat roles in the military. For transgender people, it is a term used for a person being perceived as a cisgender person of their gender instead of the sex they were assigned at birth. For example, a transgender man is passing if he is perceived as a cisgender man.

The appropriateness of the term passing, and the desirability of blending into society, are debated within the transgender community. A trans person who is perceived as cisgender may face less prejudice, harassment, and risk of violence, as well as better employment opportunities. This is sometimes termed passing privilege.

== Terminology ==
=== Gender attribution ===
Gender attribution is the process by which an observer decides which gender they believe another person to be. In most interactions, one cannot observe others' physical gender characteristics, such as their genitals, and instead use other phenotypical cues to discern another's gender, such as body shape, clothing, and voice. Once an observer makes an attribution of the person's gender, it can be difficult for the observer to change their mind and see the person as another gender. Gender attribution can be an obstacle for those seeking to pass if their physical appearance leads them to be seen as a gender different than how they wish to present.

=== Passing ===
Passing typically involves a mixture of physical gender cues, for example, hairstyle or clothing, and certain behavioral attributes that tend to be culturally associated with a particular gender.

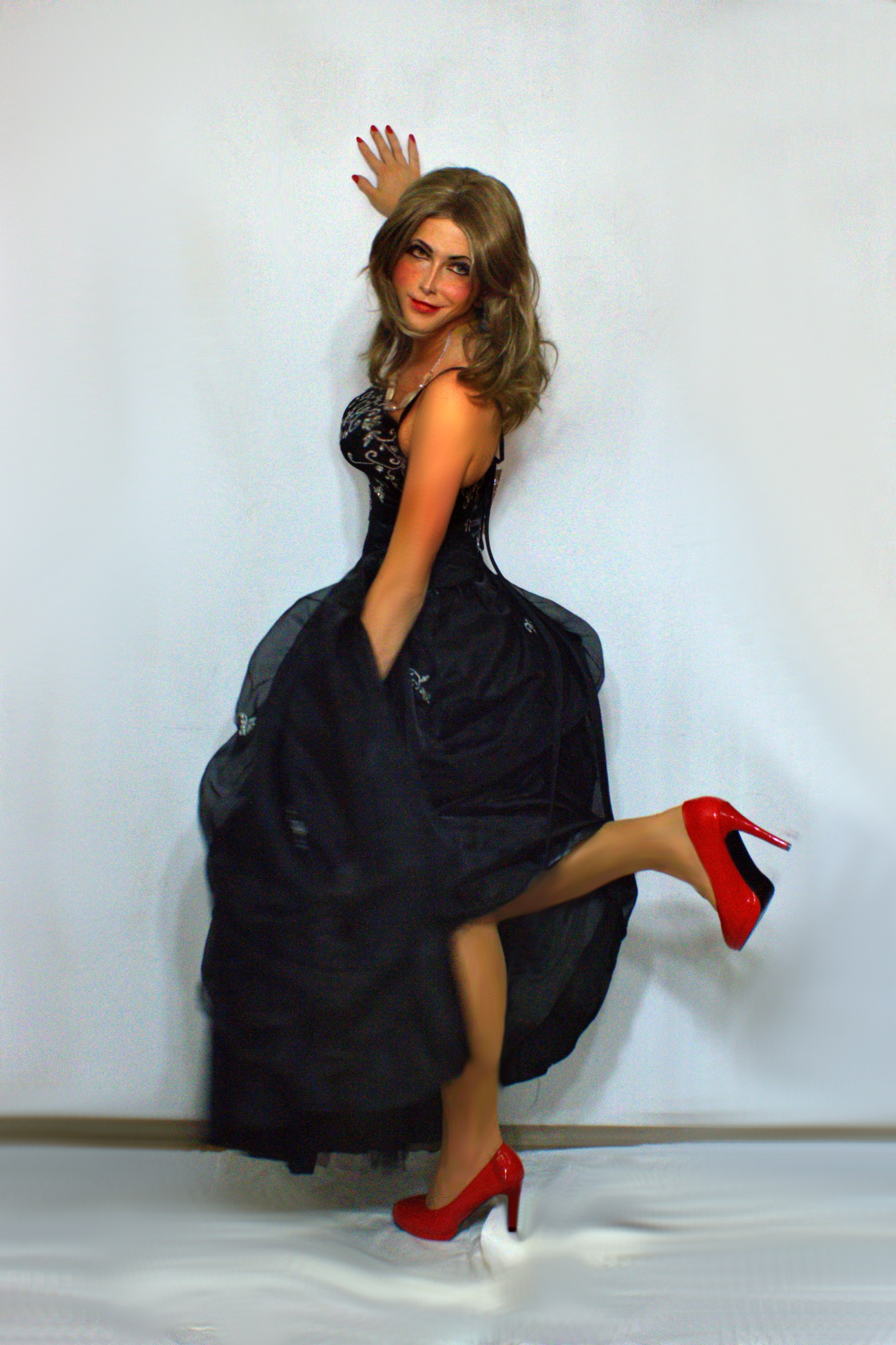
Crossdresser in a prom dress

=== Being clocked ===
Being clocked is a term for a transgender person being identified as transgender by observers, usually while trying to pass as cisgender.

=== Stealth ===
The term stealth refers to trans people who effectively pass as cisgender and do not disclose their gender history.

People may also choose to be stealth in some parts of their lives and not others, such as being stealth at work but openly transgender amongst friends. Being stealth can be chosen as a protective measure against discrimination or violence. According to Gillian Branstetter from the National Center for Transgender Equality, "People privilege the rights of others based off of how they look". People may feel safer being able to appear as a non-transgender person than if their gender identity was more easily identifiable.

== Passing privilege ==
Passing privilege is the concept that transgender people face less prejudice when they are perceived as cisgender, including less risk of harassment and violence, as well as better employment opportunities. There is a lack of research about the impact that passing has on an individual's societal experience. One study showed that passing can reduce one's likelihood of experiencing homelessness, as well as improve one's experience with homeless shelters; the study found that 11.4% of its transgender/gender non-conforming sample group stated that they had experienced homelessness directly related to their gender identity, and 16.3% indicated they needed to seek new or short-term living arrangements due to their identity. Among those dealing with direct homelessness, those who lacked the ability to pass were more likely to experience a variety of difficulties including harassment from staff and other visitors, difficulties being accepted to and staying in the shelters themselves, and being less likely to seek assistance from shelters in the first place.

=== Effects of passing and not passing ===
The risks of not fully passing for the gender one is presenting as can vary depending on the circumstances. There is a significant difference between drag queens, or those who otherwise dress for performances, and transgender persons. Risks tend to be much higher for those concerned with passing on a fairly constant basis as opposed to those attempting to pass in the context of a public or semi-public performance.

Transgender people face high rates of harassment and violence, including sexual, physical, and verbal violence and harassment, sexual objectification, and social stigmatization. Job insecurity is a risk for transgender people as well, with a 2022 US transgender survey finding that 11 percent of respondents were fired, laid off, forced to resign, or lost a job due to their gender expression or gender identity. Some trans people may stealth as cisgender for the sake of safety and/or security. Additionally, being outed by one's physical attributes as a transgender or gender non-conforming individual can negatively impact one's cultural experience, resulting in neglect, abuse, or being disowned by one's community.

Passing and choosing whether or not to be stealth can contribute to emotional stress. A study of 24 transgender and gender expansive (TGE) physicians found that "they reported a tension between wanting to be 'stealth'... and being out because of a sense of obligation to be visible for TGE patients and colleagues." Passing can lead to a sense of dissonance with the LGBT+ community and limit in-group solidarity.

Additionally, passing can result in confrontation and violence due to observers feeling tricked. DJ and transgender woman Infiniti says, "I was always upfront [about being transgender]...there were several instances where men would be like, 'You were trying to trick me' [and] getting violent."

== Methods ==
=== Passing as female ===
Passing can involve altering the face and body to appear feminine. These alterations fall into two categories: temporary items that are applied or worn, and medical alterations.

For people assigned male at birth, passing as female typically involves wearing a wig or styling hair in a manner typical of women in their culture, removing or disguising facial hair, and wearing makeup to make the face appear like that of a cisgender woman. Feminine clothing and accessories can be used as well.

Other temporary alterations shape the body to appear more stereotypically feminine. Breast prostheses are sometimes used to create the appearance of a female chest. If the clothing being worn will reveal breast cleavage, cleavage enhancement techniques can be used if there is not sufficient breast tissue to form cleavage. A feminine waist–hip ratio is created by either reducing the waist size with a corset and/or enlarging the hips and buttocks with padding.

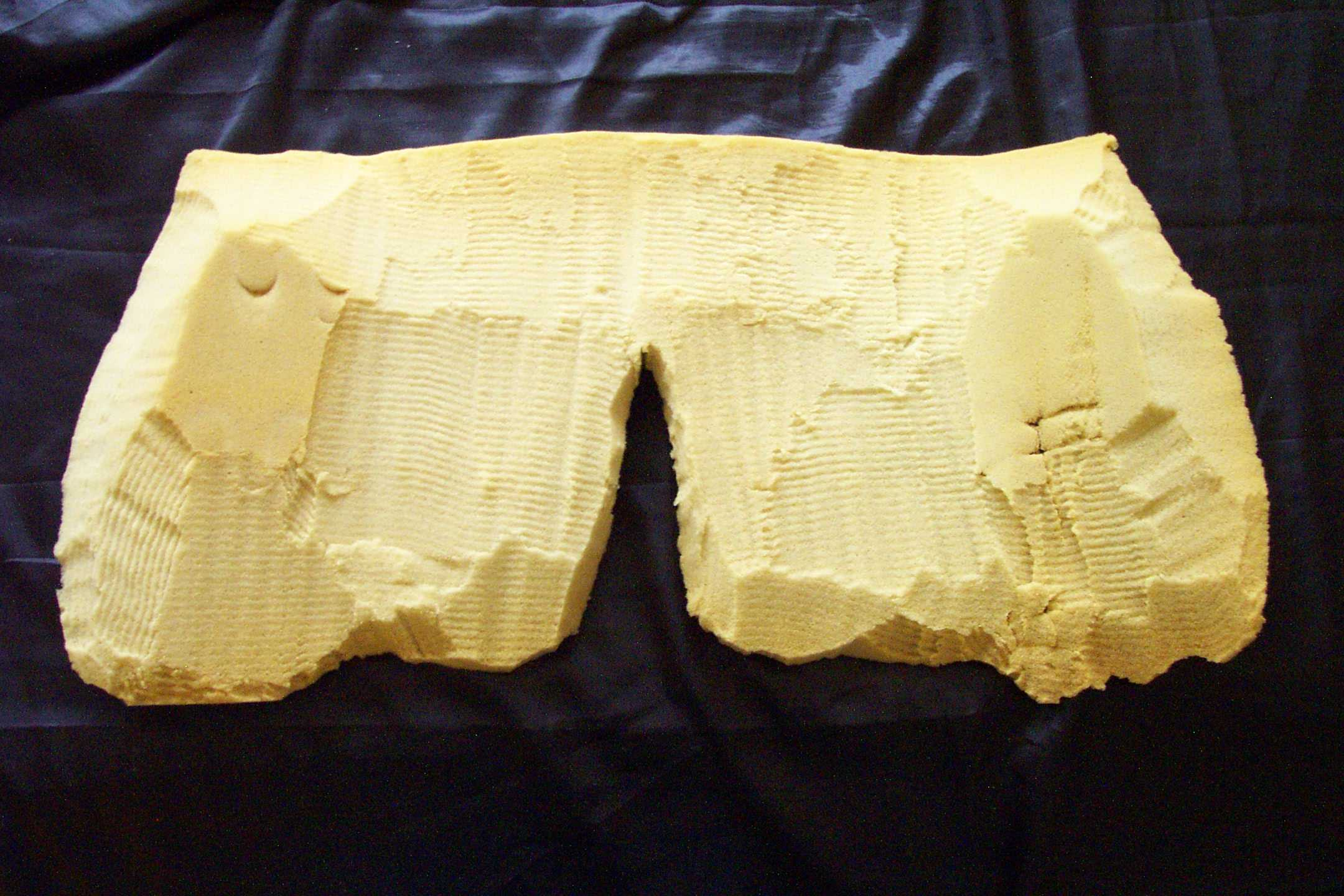
Hip and butt foam padding

Tucking, the practice of hiding the penis and testicles so that they are not visible through tight clothing, can further contribute to passing as female. The most effective method of tucking involves pushing the testicles up into the inguinal canal. Once this is done, the penis is pulled back between the legs and a tight pair of panties, a gaff, or another tight garment is then worn on top to hold everything in place. Tucking is often utilized when wearing more revealing clothing such as leggings or swimwear. For those who have not undergone or do not want to undergo sex reassignment surgery, the penile crotch protrusion (sometimes known by the slang terms moose knuckle or bulge) can be a sign of their birth sex.

Hormone replacement therapy is a medical intervention that further contributes to a female appearance by causing more feminine body fat distribution, the development of breasts, and lower waist-hip ratio. For more permanent bodily changes cosmetic surgeries can be used.

Cosmetic surgery procedures often used by transgender women include breast augmentation, liposuction and buttock augmentation, in addition to facial feminization surgery (FFS). FFS is not necessarily one individual procedure, but often many different procedures performed at the same time. FFS includes many procedures a patient can choose, such as rhinoplasty, brow lift, jaw reduction, chin augmentation, cheek implantation and lip augmentation.

Passing typically involves changes in the person's voice as well. Cisgender women typically speak with an average fundamental frequency of 165–255 Hz (E_{3}–C_{4}), while cisgender men typically speak in a fundamental frequency range of 85–155 Hz (F_{2}–D♯_{3}). In addition, the timbre of a male voice is typically different from that of a female one. This is due to male puberty typically enlarging the vocal cords, larynx, and sinus cavities. These changes are typically not reversible without voice feminization surgery, such as cricothyroid approximation or Wendler glottoplasty, as the changes of male puberty on the vocal tract cannot be undone with feminizing hormone therapy. Many transgender women are successful at feminizing their voice through self-training or transgender voice therapy.

=== Passing as male ===
For transgender men, drag kings, or any person trying to pass as male, this may include binding the breasts to create a flat-chested appearance, getting a short haircut, taking on a more masculine demeanor, and wearing masculine clothing. Baggy or loose clothing is usually preferred because it hides characteristics such as breasts and rounded hips.

Packing creates the appearance of having a penis through stuffing objects in one's crotch region. This appearance is sought out in order to pass while wearing varied clothing styles, particularly more revealing clothing, to achieve the appearance of a crotch protrusion, sometimes called a bulge. This is done on a daily basis for transgender men, sometimes for their entire lives; for other transgender men or cross-dressing women, packing is done on an as-needed basis for reasons including personal comfort and for drag performances.

Types of packers include soft packers, stand-to-pee packers, 3-in-1 packers, and pack and plays. Soft packers serve only to create the look of a bulge, and stand-to-pee packers enable the wearer to urinate while standing. Pack and plays, otherwise known as 2-in-1 packers, serve the additional purpose of sexual use and 3-in-1 packers accommodate both sexual use and standing urination. Packers are held in place with tight underwear, harnesses, or fabric pouches with Velcro to adhere to underwear. Some prosthetic packers can stay in place using surgical glue as well.

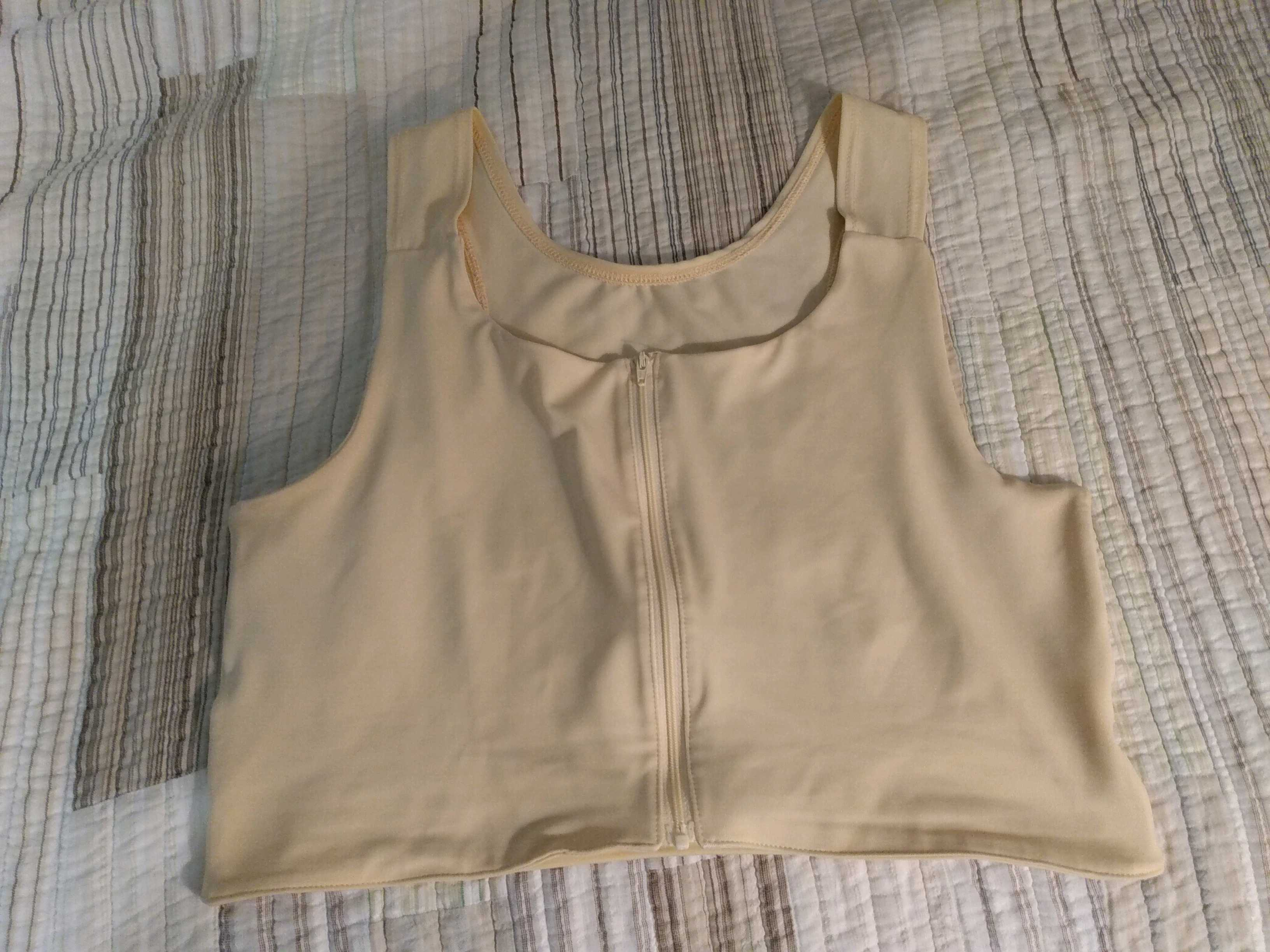
Commercially sold chest binder

Another common part of passing is chest binding to flatten one's chest. This is done with commercial binders, sports bras, or other compression athletic wear. Other methods such as duct tape, elastic bandages, and plastic wrap are advised against due to their ability to restrict blood flow and breathing as well as damage skin. It is also advised to take days off from wearing a binder when possible, wear properly sized binders, avoid sleeping in binders, and avoid wearing binders for more than 8 hours per day.

Masculinizing hormone therapy can contribute to a more male presentation by creating a more masculine physique and lowering one's voice. Transgender men undergoing cross-sex hormone therapy develop a more masculine body fat distribution and reduced hip circumference. Testosterone therapy lengthens the vocal tract and reduces fundamental frequency when speaking. If this does not bring the voice into a passable speaking range, transgender voice therapy and voice masculinizing surgery are available.

== History ==
Historically, there have been circumstances wherein people have impersonated the opposite sex for reasons other than gender identity. The most common reasons for women disguising themselves as men – often called "Passing Women" – were so that they could go into battle as soldiers, or in order to work in male-dominated professions that would not hire women.

=== Wartime ===
Hannah Snell, who disguised herself as a man and joined the British Army in 1745

Reports exist of women passing as men in both the American Revolutionary War and the American Civil War. Examples include Mary Anne Talbot and Hannah Snell.

Two of the most famous examples from earlier eras are Hua Mulan, who, according to legend, took her elderly father's place in the Chinese army, and Onorata Rodiani (1403–1452), an Italian mercenary who served as a cavalry soldier, disguised in male clothing and with a male name.

A Spaniard named Eleno de Céspedes began identifying as and dressing as a man. After a first failed attempt, he was accepted into the army to then serve for several years successfully.

Catalina de Erauso was a Spanish woman, originally a nun, who grew increasingly dissatisfied with religious life and in turn decided to dress as a man and flee to a new life. Joining the army a few years later, she did remarkably well in the military. According to source material, "After serving in several campaigns against the Indians of Chile and Peru, she distinguished herself sufficiently to be promoted to the rank of ensign." She reportedly earned a reputation of "courage and daring" while involved in campaigns. Outside of combat she was known to cause trouble frequently. Known for brawling, gambling, fighting, and killing people on a few occasions, her issues with violence would eventually lead her to reveal her true sex at what she thought at the time was the end of her life. Her female identity was revealed later in life, yet she maintained her masculine appearance until her death.

Hannah Gray was a part of the British army under the name James Gray. Due to various circumstances and issues regarding the revealing of her gender, Hannah eventually ended up joining the Royal Marines instead. She was noted to have "proved to be not only a brave warrior but a good drinking companion as well and was accepted by her mates as a man", engaging in the construct of masculinity and successfully appearing to have masculine gender.

=== Working-class passing women ===
In Stone Butch Blues, Leslie Feinberg wrote about working class, butch lesbians in the 1960s who chose to pass as men in order to find jobs that would enable them to support their families. While the 1993 novel is fiction, there are women, including Feinberg, who took testosterone in this era for these reasons. Factory jobs, in particular, usually only paid men a living wage that could also support a partner and children. Some of these passing women later identified as transgender men, while others stopped taking hormones and returned to a butch female presentation once gains made by feminists allowed for better employment opportunities.

=== Upper-class passing men ===
Cases of male impersonation by women appear to be more historically common than those of female impersonation by men. Outside of artistic expression, men who attempt to pass as women are not only less common but less socially accepted as a result. Many known male to female cross dressers are those from the upper class who do not face the same socioeconomic risks in repercussion to their cross-dressing.

Henry III of France was a historic cross-dresser, noted to dress as the opposite sex at grand parties and events. He was reported to have "dressed as an Amazon" or "wearing a ball gown, makeup, earrings, and other jewelry, and attended by his so called mignons, or homosexual favorites".

=== Musicians ===
American band leader Billy Tipton had a successful career as a jazz musician from the 1930s through the 1970s and was from the conservative Midwest. The world at large only discovered Tipton was assigned female at birth after his death.

To maintain anonymity while in Bahrain, pop star Michael Jackson wore women's clothes when out in public.

== Modern context ==
In the context of gender, passing refers to transgender people being perceived as the gender they identify as and/or being perceived as cisgender. Passing can be important for mental health and, for some transgender people, their safety.

Other transgender people, including non-binary people, have different attitudes towards passing. For example, they might not try to pass at all, they may engage in genderfuck (sending consciously mixed signals), or they might be able to pass, but do not hide the fact that they are transgender. Personal views on passing and the desire or need to pass are independent of whether an individual has had medical treatment or has legally changed their gender.

== Controversy ==
The term passing is widely used within the transgender community, but is also a subject of debate within the same community due to its perceived implication of dishonesty or deception. Trans writer Janet Mock says that the term is "based on an assumption that trans people are passing as something that we are not" and that, in reality, a trans woman who is perceived as a woman "isn't passing; she is merely being". The GLAAD Media Guide advises that "it is not appropriate" for mainstream media to use the term passing except in direct quotes. GLAAD instead recommends using a phrase such as "not perceived as transgender".

== See also ==
- Closeted
- Gender expression
- Outline of transgender topics
- Mimicry#Inter-sexual mimicry
- Minority stress
- Passing (racial identity)
- Pronoun game
- Sexism
- Social construction of gender
