= Gender transition =

Changing gender presentation to accord with gender identity

Gender transition is the process of affirming and expressing internal sense of gender, rather than the sex assigned at birth. It is a recommended course of treatment for persons experiencing gender dysphoria, providing improved mental health outcomes in the majority of people.

A social transition may include coming out as transgender, (Note: While the label Transgender is used here, people of diverse gender identities may socially or medically transition.) using a new name and pronouns, and changing one's public gender expression. This is usually the first step in a gender transition. People socially transition at almost any age, as a social transition does not involve medical procedures. It can, however, be a prerequisite to accessing transgender healthcare in many places.

In transgender youth, puberty blockers are sometimes offered at the onset of puberty to allow the exploration of their gender identity without the distress of irreversible pubertal changes. Upon reaching the age of consent, they become eligible to pursue a medical transition if it is still desired.

A medical transition may include gender-affirming hormone therapy (GAHT), transgender voice therapy, and gender-affirming surgery. The ability to start a medical transition is typically offered after a diagnosis of gender dysphoria, a form of medicalization. In recent years, there has been a push for an informed consent model of transgender healthcare which allows adults to access HRT without a formal diagnosis.

Transitioning is a process that can take anywhere from several months to several years, and may affect any or all of the gendered aspects of a person's life, which include aesthetics, social roles, legal status, and biological aspects of the body. Details of an individual's transition may vary based on gender identity, body image, personality, finances, the attitudes of others and culturally specific views of gender.

== Terminology ==
This page uses topic-specific vocabulary, defined below:

- Gender identity is a person's internal sense of their own gender. It may correlate with the gender assigned at birth or differ from it. In most individuals, gender identity is congruent with their assigned gender - these individuals are cisgender. Those who do not identify with their birth gender may identify as transgender.
- Cisgender is an adjective that refers to people who identify the gender assigned to them at birth. Cisgender people may have any sexual orientation or gender expression.
- Transgender is an adjective that refers to people who identify with a gender that differs from the one assigned to them at birth. Transgender people may have any sexual orientation or gender expression.
- Assigned gender at birth (AGAB) is a term that refers to the sex or gender assigned to people when they are born. Assigned a gender at birth is based on physical characteristics, and does not account for internal gender identity.
- Gender expression refers to the external presentation of gender identity. Typically, a person's gender expression is thought of in terms of masculinity (a tomboy, a butch lesbian, a drag king) or femininity (an effeminate male, a 'femboy', a drag queen), but an individual's gender expression may incorporate both feminine and masculine traits, or neither. One may express their gender through clothing, behavior, hair styling, voice, etc. It is not necessarily related to one's gender identity.
- Gender euphoria is the positive feeling experienced when one's gender is affirmed. It is often considered the opposite of gender dysphoria.
- Gender dysphoria is the distress a person experiences from a mismatch between their internal gender identity and their gender assigned at birth. People who suffer from gender dysphoria may transition in order to alleviate this distress.
- Non-binary is a gender identity described as neither entirely male nor female (not one of the two binary sexes). Non-binary people may suffer from gender dysphoria, and may consider themselves transgender. Non-binary people may have any sexual orientation or gender expression.
- Transitioning refers to the process of affirming and expressing one's internal sense of gender, as opposed to the gender assigned to them at birth. There are two major facets of gender transitioning: a social transition, and a medical transition; almost all transgender people will socially transition, and many will undergo some degree of medical transition.
- Detransitioning (sometimes also known as re-transitioning) is the cessation of transgender identity, a transition to a different gender or both, often to the natal gender.

== Social transition ==
Social transitioning is the process of changing the way one presents their gender to others. The social process of transitioning can begin with 'coming out', where others are told that one does not identify with their birth sex. The newly out trans person may adopt a new name, ask to be referred to with a new set of pronouns, and change their presentation to better reflect their identity.

Social transition is usually reversible, and as such, it is many people's first step in transitioning. While socially transitioning does not involve medical intervention or gender affirming surgery, it may be a prerequisite to access transgender healthcare in some regions.

People may socially transition at any age, with documented cases of children as young as 5, or adults as old as 75. While many of those who socially transition will pursue a medical transition, not everyone can access gender affirming care, and not all may wish to pursue it.

=== Passing ===
Passing refers to the perception and recognition of trans people as their desired gender identity by outsiders who may not know they are transgender. For many trans people, passing is a very important aspect of their transition often seen as an 'end goal'. Passing can greatly alleviate gender dysphoria. Failure to pass can cause serious repercussions for trans people's psychological well-being and safety, including but not limited to: poor mental health, discrimination, increased barriers to medical care, harassment, fetishization, ostracization, increased risk of homelessness, and targeted violence due to increased visibility of one's transgender status. Going 'full-time' refers to the act of living everyday life as one's identified gender. People who go full-time may or may not fully pass, and may or may not keep their transgender identity a secret.

Going 'stealth' refers to the act of living as one's identified gender without revealing oneself to be transgender. In some countries, being stealth may be a safety necessity, due to health, safety, and wellbeing risks of being openly transgender.

=== Legal aspects ===
Transgender people in many parts of the world can legally change their name to something consistent with their gender identity. Some regions also allow one's legal sex marker changed on documents such as driver licenses, birth certificates, and passports. The exact requirements vary from jurisdiction to jurisdiction; some require sex reassignment surgery, while many do not. In addition, some states that require sex reassignment surgery will only accept 'bottom surgery', or a genital reconstruction surgery, as a valid form of sex reassignment surgery, while other states allow other forms of gender confirmation surgery to qualify individuals for changing information on their birth certificates. In some U.S. states, it is also possible for transgender individuals to legally change their gender on their drivers license without having had any form of qualifying gender confirmation surgery. Also, some U.S. states are beginning to add the option of legally changing one's gender marker to X on legal documents, an option used by some non-binary people.

=== Social repercussions ===
A person's ideas about gender in general may change as part of their transition, which may affect their religious, philosophical or political beliefs. In addition, personal relationships can take on different dynamics after coming out. For instance, what was originally a lesbian couple may become a heterosexual one as a partner comes out as a trans man - or parents of a boy may become parents of a girl after their child comes out as a trans woman.

Over the course of a gender transition, people who are close to the transitioning individual may experience a sense of loss and work through a grieving process. This type of loss is an ambiguous loss, characterized by feelings of grief where the item of loss is obscure. Family members may grieve for the gendered expectations that their loved one will no longer follow, whereas the transgender person themself may feel rejected by their relatives' need to grieve. Feelings that arise are described as a way of seeing the person who is transitioning as the same, but different, or both present and absent.

== Medical transition ==
Physical aspects of gender transition can go along with social aspects; as well as wearing gender affirming clothing, transgender people often hide features from their natal puberty; for example, transgender men binding their breasts and transgender women shaving. Other physical aspects of transitioning require medical intervention, such as gender-affirming hormone therapy or gender-affirming surgery.

Most transgender individuals will receive few, if any, surgeries throughout their lifetimes and some may never receive HRT. Barriers to accessing medical transitioning can include: a lack of financing, a lack of desire, or a lack of accessibility.

=== Puberty blockers ===
Puberty blockers / hormone blockers are medications used to block natal sex hormones. For transgender youth, hormone blockers may be offered at the onset of puberty to allow the exploration of their gender identity without the distress of irreversible pubertal changes. Puberty blockers are considered reversible and their use is deemed safe and effective as treatment for gender dysphoria in gender-diverse children and for precocious puberty in cisgender children; their use may be discontinued at any time if natal puberty-blocking is no longer desired, or if cross-sex hormone replacement therapy is initiated. For transgender adults, hormone blockers may be offered in a course with cross-sex hormone replacement therapy in order to treat gender dysphoria.

=== Hormone replacement therapy ===
Gender-affirming hormone therapy (GAHT) is a medical treatment that replaces the primary sex hormones in the body, in order to develop the secondary sex characteristics of the opposite sex. Typically, masculinizing GAHT uses the male sex hormone testosterone, while feminizing GAHT uses the female sex hormone estrogen and sometimes progesterone, as well as testosterone blockers.

=== Voice training ===
Voice therapy (or 'voice training') is non-surgical gender-affirming treatment for the masculinization or feminization of the voice. Transfeminine people will not experience any impact on voice pitch from feminizing hormone therapy (unless their natal puberty was sufficiently blocked), so voice training is very often undergone in order to learn how to speak in a higher and more feminine register. Transmasculine people, on the other hand, will experience a marked lowering in pitch from masculinizing HRT (testosterone) to a cisgender male level, so vocal masculinization training is not as typical as vocal feminization training. Irrespectively, vocal masculinization training can help one learn to speak in a lower and more masculine register.

=== Surgery ===
Voice surgery refers to a surgical treatment that allows for the masculinization or feminization of one's vocal pitch. Transfeminine people can undergo voice surgery to surgically increase their pitch range. Transmasculine people very uncommonly undergo voice surgery, as masculinizing HRT (testosterone) often lowers voices to a cisgender male pitch. Irrespectively, vocal masculinization surgery can be underwent to surgically decrease their pitch range.

Facial surgery is gender-affirming surgery underwent on the face, usually facial masculinization or facial feminization.

Top surgery refers to gender affirming surgeries of the breasts. In transmasculine and/or nonbinary individuals, this may be a double mastectomy (removal of breast tissue), and/or a ''chest reconstruction'. In transfeminine and/or nonbinary individuals, this may be a breast augmentation. Top surgery requires the ability to give informed consent to the medical procedure. The individual getting the procedure will have to understand the legal requirements and prerequisites to get top surgery. They will also have to understand the aftercare procedure given by the doctor. The specifics of the procedure will vary depending on what the individual wants done and the specializations of the doctor doing the procedure. The different types of top surgery available are listed below:

- Double incision top surgery with nipple grafts: Procedure where the nipples and breast tissue are removed, then the nipples are repositioned and re-attached. The incisions are made along the left and right side of the chest. The nipples may be reshaped and reduced before re-attachment, and lose sensation after the procedure. This procedure is typically chosen for those who want a more masculine look.
- Periareolar top surgery: Breast tissue is removed through a small incision under the nipple. Also known as 'keyhole top surgery'. This type of surgery is used to remove smaller breasts for a more masculine chest.
- Inverted-T top Surgery: Uses the same horizontal incisions as double incision surgery, but adds a vertical incision to the nipple to preserve the blood supply and sensation in the nipple. The nipple stalk is not severed, so more sensation is maintained.
- Breast augmentation: An implant is inserted under the chest tissue to create the look of breasts.

Bottom surgery refers to gender affirming surgeries performed on the genitalia. In transmasculine and/or nonbinary individuals, this may be a hysterectomy (removal of the uterus), a oophorectomy (removal of the ovaries), or both. A penis can be constructed through metoidioplasty or phalloplasty, and a scrotum through scrotoplasty. In transfeminine and nonbinary individuals, this may be a penectomy (removal of the penis), orchiectomy (removal of the testicles), vaginoplasty (construction of a vagina), or a vulvoplasty (construction of a vulva).

== See also ==
- List of transgender-related topics
