= Voice dysphoria =

Subtype of gender dysphoria

Voice dysphoria is the distress a person experiences due to inconsistency between their gender identity and their voice. It is a specific type of gender dysphoria that concerns voice/speech patterns that may deviate from their internal gender identity and gender expression. Voice dysphoria is not formally recognized in the DSM-5 or ICD-11, and voice dysphoria is not a criterion for diagnosis with gender dysphoria.

Not all transgender people have voice dysphoria, although it is estimated that upwards of 70% of transgender people experience voice dysphoria to some extent. Treatment for voice dysphoria includes gender-affirming care such as puberty blockers (for preadolescents), hormone replacement therapy (for transgender men), voice therapy, or voice surgery to alter the overall tone and quality of one's voice. Complications from untreated voice dysphoria may include poorer quality of life or mental health concerns, such as anxiety or depression.

Voice dysphoria is distinct from voice confrontation, in which a person does not like the sound of their own voice when played back from audio recording, which is primarily attributed to cognitive dissonance between a person's perception and expectation for the sound of their own voice. While people with voice dysphoria may also experience voice confrontation, discomfort experienced from voice confrontation is temporary and may resolve with familiarity with hearing one's voice through recording frequently. Distress experienced from voice dysphoria is attributed to gender incongruence, is long-lasting, and often does not resolve without some form of intervention.

It is also distinct from voice dysphonia, which describes when one's voice involuntarily sounds breathy, raspy, or strained. Voice dysphonia is a clinical voice disorder marked by abnormal voice quality due to structural, functional, or neurological problems with the vocal folds or larynx.

== Causes and contributing factors ==
Voice dysphoria primarily arises from a perceived mismatch between an individual's gender identity and the gendered characteristics of their voice, such as pitch, resonance, intonation, and prosody, which are often shaped by puberty and hormone exposure. In transgender women, endogeneous testosterone produced during male puberty causes growth in the larynx (or voice box), leading to vocal deepening that may be incongruent with feminine vocal pitch. In contrast, lack of growth in the larynx typical of female puberty may contribute to voice dysphoria in transgender men, as higher vocal pitch may be incongruent with masculine vocal pitch.

Sociocultural norms about gendered voices—such as expectations of lower pitch and darker resonance for masculine voices—strongly shape the experience of voice dysphoria by reinforcing what sounds "correct" for a given gender. Incongruence with sociocultural vocal norms may also contribute to instances of misgendering and increase both voice and gender dysphoria in transgender and gender non-conforming people.

== Assessment and diagnosis ==
Voice dysphoria is not an independent diagnostic category in manuals like the DSM-5 and ICD-11. Clinicians assess voice dysphoria primarily through self-reported measures of distress, voice satisfaction, functional impairment (e.g., avoidance of speaking situations), and perceived gender congruence of vocal traits. In many cases, transgender people will seek voice therapy with speech–language pathologists spontaneously.

== Management and intervention ==
=== Puberty blockers ===
For transgender youth, the use of puberty blockers in transgender women can be used to prevent or stop progression of male pubertal changes like the thickening of the vocal cords. This prevents (further) deepening of the voice and maintains prepubertal vocal resonance and pitch, but cannot reverse existing changes to the voice and thus are no longer effective past Tanner stage 2.

=== Gender-affirming hormone therapy ===
For transgender men, the use of masculinizing hormone therapy raises serum testosterone levels comparable to cisgender men. Pubertal effects begin to occur once serum testosterone levels are consistently above normal adult female levels for several months, including the thickening of the vocal cords and deepening of the voice. Thus, transgender men often see significant reductions in voice dysphoria and greater satisfaction with their voices following HRT and are less likely to seek out future treatment for voice dysphoria than transgender women. For some, however, masculinization achieved by HRT is not adequate to resolve voice dysphoria.

For transgender women, the use of feminizing hormone therapy cannot reverse pubertal vocal deepening.

=== Voice therapy ===
Transgender voice therapy is any non-surgical vocal therapy technique used to improve or modify the human voice to allieviate gender dysphoria. This type of therapy, often performed by speech-language pathologists, can help transgender patients modify certain voice characteristics to align with their internal gender identity, and transgender people who have undertaken voice therapy have shown strong reductions in voice dysphoria. Most clinicians encourage starting with voice therapy, and often, voice surgery is considered when non-surgical methods fail to achieve the desired outcome.

=== Voice surgery ===
In severe cases, transgender people may undergo voice surgeries used to modify the human voice by surgically altering the vocal folds. These can include elongation of the vocal cords (cricothyroid approximation), shortening of the vibrating length of the vocal folds (Wendler glottoplasty), or altering the size of the larynx (laryngoplasty). While voice surgery can be pursued alone, it is generally recommended that transgender people considering transgender voice surgery continue to go to voice therapy both before and after surgical interventions.
