= Feminization laryngoplasty =

Surgery to increase voice pitch

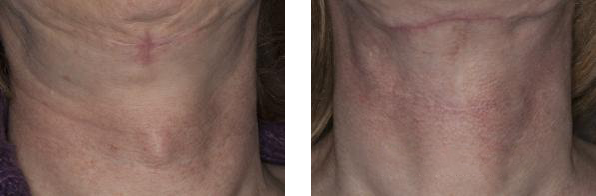
- Before and after images of a feminization laryngoplasty patient
- Pronunciation: /ləˈrɪŋɡəˌplæsti/
- Other names: FemLar
- Specialty: Laryngology
- MeSH: D058753

Feminization laryngoplasty (also known as FL or FemLar/Femlar) is a reconstructive surgery surgical procedure that attempts to increase the baseline pitch of a patient, making the voice sound higher and more feminine. It is a heavily modified Type 4 thyroplasty that is distinct in critically avoiding a cricothyroid approximation. Instead, as a form of open laryngoplasty a partial laryngectomy of the anterior portion of the larynx is removed, diminishing the diameter of the larynx to cisgender female proportions. The surgery can be categorized into two main steps: Incision and vocal fold modification followed by thyrohyoid elevation. A reduction in larynx diameter modifies vocal weight or resonance quality of the voice while allowing more vocal range access than a type 4 thyroplasty usually allows, as the function of cricothyroid muscle is preserved. Risks and complications include granuloma, dysphonia and tracheostomy. Patients are recommended to follow perioperative management such as voice rest and antibiotics to hasten recovery.

The operation will also diminish the masculine neck profile caused by "Adam's apple" after the removal of anterior cartilage, achieving a more feminine neck appearance. This effect is more pronounced than the reduction that can be typically achieved with a tracheal shave as it explicitly goes further than a tracheal shave and removes tissue that should be avoided by the surgeon during a tracheal shave. Thus, if a patient opts for this procedure, they will typically not need a tracheal shave.

The procedure is less popular and well-known than other forms of voice feminization surgery and is currently performed by a limited set of surgeons due to the need for specialized sutures and training. This includes, but is not limited to several surgeons in the US, Thailand, and Australia. There are doctors using this term (FemLar) generically to describe their suite of voice and larynx feminization procedures, that do not perform this particular procedure, but rather other procedures such as glottoplasty, cricothyroid approximation, and tracheal shaves.

== Background ==
=== Transgender women ===
During puberty, testosterone, causes the diameter of the larynx to increase and the vocal folds to thicken and lengthen. This change is irreversible even with the help of feminizing hormone therapy. The fundamental and resonant frequency of their voice decreases and they no longer match to the desired vocal range that suits their gender identity.

=== Nonbinary people and cisgender women ===
Cisgender women with an abnormally low voice and gender nonconforming individuals may also seek feminization laryngoplasty. However, the target pitch for nonbinary people may be different from people who identify solely as women. For instance, some would hope to achieve an androgynous voice rather than a completely feminine voice. Therefore, laryngologists should work closely with patients to tailor to their personal needs to maximize satisfaction.

=== Voice therapy ===
Individuals who sought vocal alterations are first recommended to undergo voice therapy to generate a desirable vocal pitch and resonance. Some individuals could substantially achieve a more feminine voice by adapting to a new habitual coordination of muscles in their vocal cords. However, results vary greatly from person to person and often require an active effort to maintain. A persistent effort of using a more feminine voice could lead to straining and other pathological issues in vocal cords. Surgical means of voice feminization such as feminization laryngoplasty can be an alternative to vocal therapy when effects from training alone are unsatisfactory, allowing patients to permanently modify their comfortable speaking pitch and resonance.

It is estimated that about 1% of transgender women have opted for a surgical procedure of voice feminization, while a larger proportion of transgender women (14%) opted for non-surgical means of voice feminization (i.e. voice therapy).

== History ==
Transgender surgery in general has gained its initial momentum in the early 1950s after the attention brought by American transgender woman Christine Jorgensen. Sexual reassignment surgeries have seen an exponential increase in public awareness during that period of time. However, it was not until a few decades ago had voice feminization garnered its own recognition from public audience.

=== History of voice feminization ===
Previously, gender affirmation surgery has put great emphasis on genital conformation only. In the last few decades, as the interpretations of gender identity in society shifts, gender affirmation surgery has expanded to the territories of secondary sex characteristics, in a way that voice feminization has seen unprecedented attention. Study notes that throughout the decades, there has been an increasing trend of emphasis on social recognition (i.e. interacting with other people in the community under their own preferred gender identity) rather than sexual recognition alone. Several cosmetic surgeons have claimed that most of their patients are satisfied with alterations on secondary sexual characteristics and are not tempted to seek additional genital surgery.

=== Traditional techniques ===
The first experimental study to surgically raise the speaking pitch was performed by Japanese otorhinolaryngologist Kazutomo Kitajima and his colleagues in 1979. They together discovered the inverse linear relationship between the vocal pitch and the distance between the thyroid cartilage and cricoid cartilage. Based on this principle, the first surgical procedure for voice feminization, cricothyroid approximation (CTA) was developed to achieve pitch increase by reducing the separation between the two cartilages. This procedure remains the most well known among transgender women seeking surgical voice feminization. However the results are often unsatisfactory with CTA due to the unnatural falsetto quality of the voice. Other surgical solutions were also developed, including Wendler (Web) Glottoplasty (also known as anterior web glottal formation, newer versions of this surgery are also occasionally referred to as VFSRAC, Vocal Fold Shortening with Retrodisplacement of the Anterior Commissure), and a variant of it, laser reduction glottoplasty (LRG), as well as laser tuning, including laser assisted voice adjustment (LAVA) and vocal fold muscle reduction (VFMR). The glottoplasty and laser tuning options do not have this falsetto issue, unlike CTA. However, they generally have a longer and more complex recovery.

=== Modern technique ===
The concept of feminization laryngoplasty originated from the open laryngoplasty technique proposed by cosmetic surgeon Somyos Kunachak. The first operation was then performed by James P. Thomas in 2003. Compared to other surgeries, feminization laryngoplasty could be undergone as one single surgery for thyroid chondroplasty to reduce the prominence of the "Adam's apple", while the other solutions had to perform chondroplasty separately.

== Modern procedure ==
=== Presurgical management ===
Before the operation, antibiotics such as clindamycin and ceftriaxone are administered intravenously to reduce surgical infection. Dexamethasone is also given to reduce edema.

To better analyze the change in voice pitch and quality after the surgical operation, voice recordings are also taken before and after the laryngoplasty.

=== Incision and vocal fold modification ===
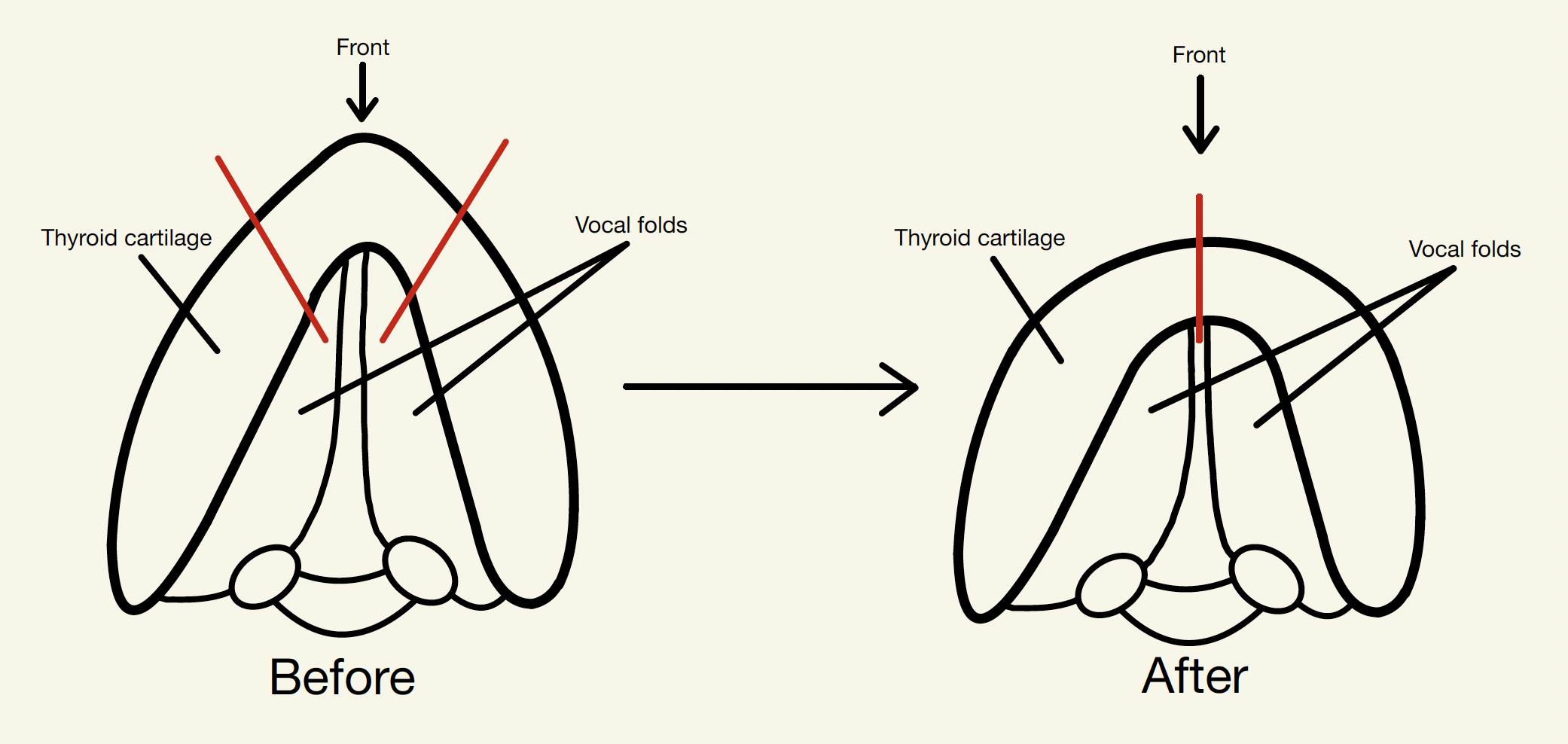
The horizontal cross section of thyroid cartilage before and after feminization laryngoplasty. The thyroid cartilage is cut along the red line (left), with the part in between the lines removed and the remaining parts sutured together (right).

General anesthesia would be administered beforehand. A 5 cm long horizontal incision would then be made at a skin crease above the thyroid notch, allowing the postoperative scar to be hidden under the crease. After flaps have been created under the platysma, the strap muscles would be separated along the midline to expose the thyroid cartilage. This allows a strip of the anterior thyroid cartilage to be removed to effectively reduce the contour of the Adam's apple and the diameter of the laryngeal opening.

A quarter of the anterior false folds would also be removed to further reduce the diameter of the upper larynx and to provide a better view of the true vocal folds. Subsequently, up to 50% of the anterior vocal folds is removed and the length of pharynx is shortened to raise the speaking pitch. The overall size of glottal region is also reduced, which diminishes the thyroid notch.

=== Thyrohyoid elevation ===
By elevating the thyrohyoid muscle, the distance between the thyroid cartilage and the hyoid bone can be decreased. This may be further facilitated by removing upper thyroid alae in the operating room to provide additional room to elevate the larynx.

At last, eight holes are drilled on the thyroid cartilage and hyoid bone for the placement of sutures and screws, securing and suspending the structure of the larynx higher in the neck, but still allowing it to move up and down to facilitate functions such as swallowing. The strap muscles are then reattached and the skin is closed with sutures.

=== Postsurgical management ===
Following surgery completion, patients are prescribed acetaminophen with narcotic pain medication for pain relief and cefpodoxime or levofloxacin for 7 days to minimize infection.

== Risks and complications ==
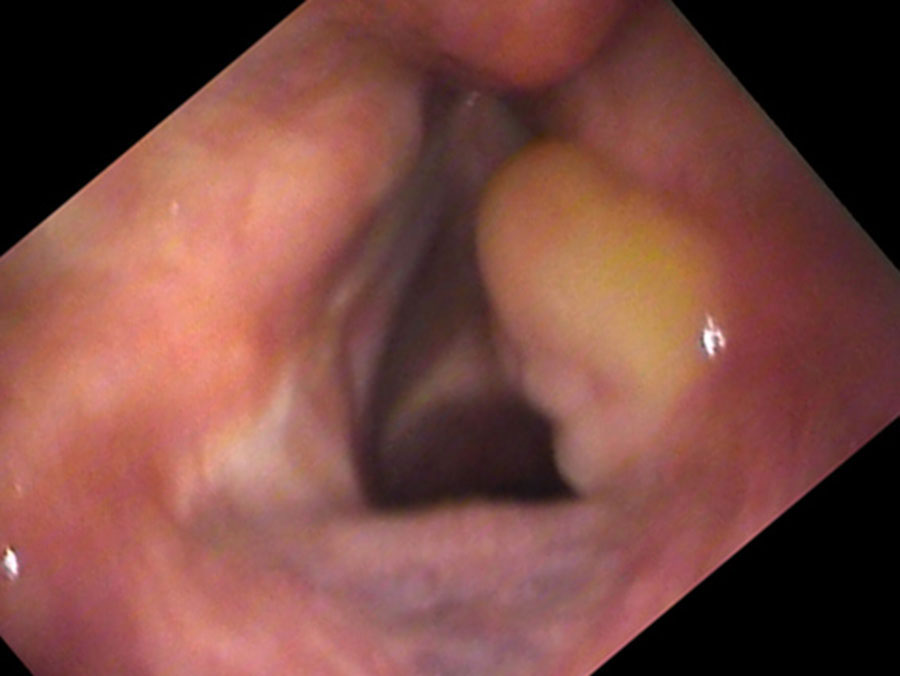
Granuloma of the vocal cord

After feminization laryngoplasty, most patients would experience a drop in voice volume and some may experience a decreased vocal pitch. Continuity of range might also be negatively affected. Therefore, the surgery might be less suited for vocal performance professionals. Vocal Fold Muscle Reduction, a standalone laser tuning procedure, can also be considered for professional voice users as well.

Granuloma in the vocal cords is also a possible complication, which may cause a soft and whispery voice. The granuloma should eventually be coughed out, or in some case be removed manually. Dysphonia is another common symptom in the first two months of recovery, but the issue gradually resolves in most patients. Further treatment or revision surgery might be needed for some patients with serious unresolved sound hoarseness after extended periods of recovery. If the vocal cords heal with asymmetrical tension, laser treatment is generally required to correct the defect.

In some rare cases, severe swelling could lead to difficulty in breathing, which may require tracheostomy to bypass the area of obstruction.

== Post-operative care ==
Following feminization laryngoplasty, patients are usually discharged without the need for overnight stay. Exceptions would be made when complications have occurred, during which the patient would have to stay in a hospital for up to a week.

Complete voice rest after the surgery is also necessary for fast healing as the vocal cords are only supported by a few sutures. Those who have undergone the procedure are advised to have vocal rest for at least 2 weeks, no aerobic activity for 3 weeks and no weight lifting for a month to give time for scar tissue to develop and support the larynx. It is also advised to refrain from having surgery requiring intubation for at least 6 months.

To maximize the effects of the surgery and to adapt to the new feminine voice, patients are also highly recommended to undergo vocal therapy, during which patients could learn to feminize their voice intonation, volume, resonance and non-verbal communication such as gesture and articulation.

For patients who are still unsatisfied with the pitch increase after the surgery, revision surgery or laser tuning could be considered to improve results. However, a revision is generally not recommended to patient with medical records of voice surgery prior to feminization laryngoplasty.

== See also ==
- Transgender voice therapy
- List of transgender-related topics
- Adrenogenital syndrome
- Speech pathology
