= Moose knuckle =

Moose knuckle or mooseknuckle may refer to:

- slang for the visible outline of a, usually male, crotch bulge through clothing
- The keratinized hoof of a moose; or a track left by one
- Moose Knuckle, a 2012 CD release by musician Zachariah Selwyn
- Mooseknuckle, a fictional town in the animated series Iggy Arbuckle

== See also ==
- or
- or
- Camel toe
- Gaff (clothing)
