= VFS =

The initialism VFS can mean:

- Marikina Valley Fault System, a dextral strike-slip fault in the Philippines.
- Vancouver Film School, a school in Vancouver, British Columbia, Canada
- Vancouver Film Studios, a film production centre in Vancouver, British Columbia
- Viafiers federalas svizras, Swiss Federal Railways
- Versioning file system, a file system which provides for the concurrent existence of several versions of a file
- Vertical Flight Society, a United States based society for the advancement of vertical flight
- Vertical formation skydiving, is a subcategory of formation skydiving using high-speed body positions normally associated with freeflying
- Virtual file system, a file system acting as an abstraction layer on top of a more concrete file system
- Visa Facilitation Services, an organization in India for processing visa applications
- VinFast, a Vietnamese automotive company (Nasdaq symbol: VFS)
- Voice feminization surgery, term for gender-affirming surgery to raise the pitch of the voice
