= Chondroplasty =

Surgery of the cartilage

Chondroplasty is surgery of the cartilage, the most common being corrective surgery of the cartilage of the knee.

Surgery known as thyroid chondroplasty (or tracheal shave) is used to reduce the visibility of the Adam's apple in transgender women.
