= Medialization =

Medialization may refer to:

- Mediatization (media), how mass media influence other sectors of society
- Laryngoplasty, vocal fold surgery
