= Trans woman =

Woman assigned male at birth

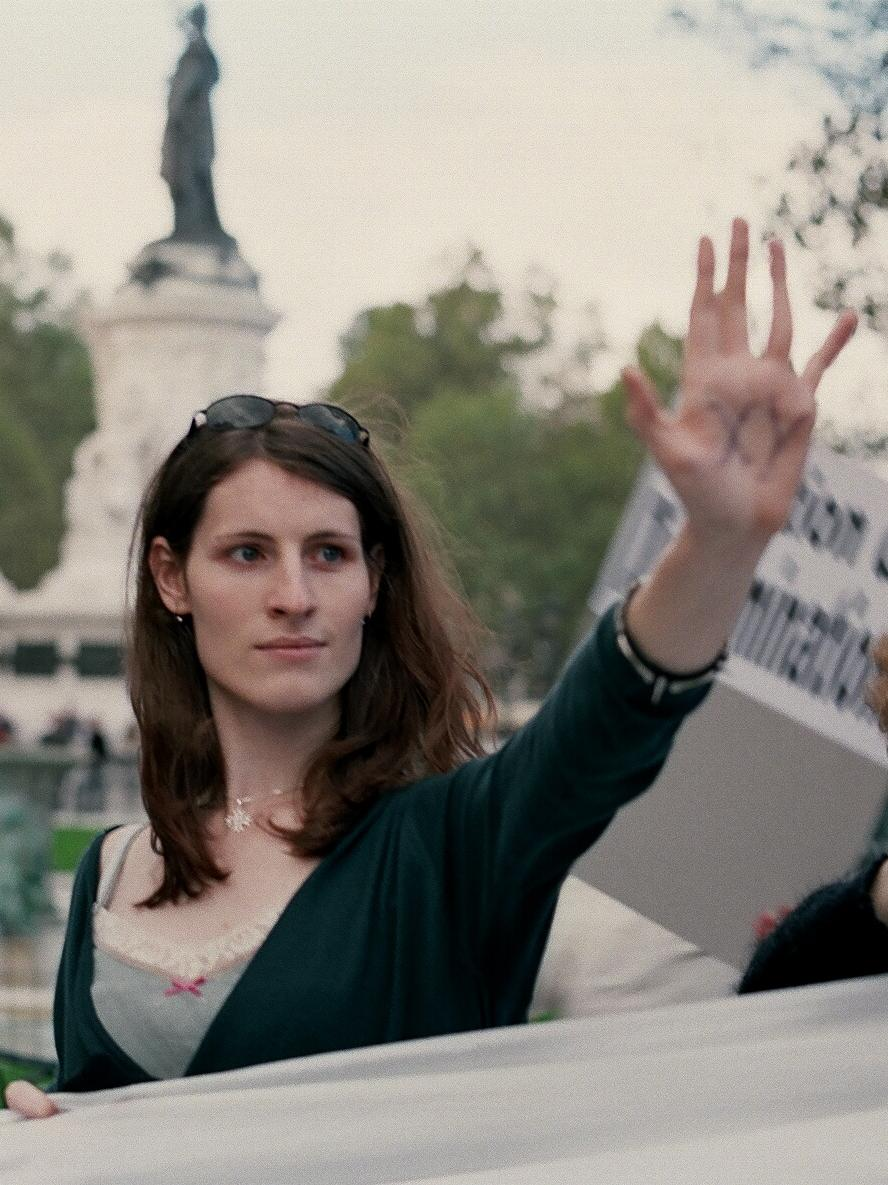
A trans woman in Paris, France, October 2005, at Existrans, an annual event to generate attention for the rights of trans and intersex people.

A trans woman or transgender woman is a woman who was assigned male at birth. Many trans women experience gender dysphoria, the distress that can arise from incongruence between their gender identity and their physical sex characteristics or the social expectations associated with their sex assigned at birth. Gender transition can reduce this incongruence and the associated distress.

The term trans woman is sometimes used interchangeably with the earlier medical term male-to-female transsexual, though the latter refers specifically to those who have undergone medical transition, and is generally considered outdated. Someone assigned female at birth with a male gender identity is called a trans man. The opposite of transgender is cisgender. Trans women may have any sexual and romantic orientation, including being straight (attracted to men), lesbian (attracted to women), or bisexual.

As part of social transition, trans women often adopt a more feminine gender expression with the goal of being perceived as female, for example taking on a new name, hairstyle, clothing style, and voice which affirm one's identity. Many trans women also transition medically through gender-affirming medical treatment, in order to develop female sexual characteristics. A major component of this is feminizing hormone therapy, which stimulates the development of breasts. Some also undergo feminizing surgeries, including breast augmentation, facial feminization, vocal feminization, and vaginoplasty. Relatively few transgender people are able to access surgery, due to legal and financial obstacles.

Trans women face significant discrimination (called transmisogyny) in many areas of life—including employment and housing. In the United States, discrimination is particularly severe against non-white trans women, who experience the intersection of transphobia, misogyny and racism, and are at heightened risk of physical and sexual violence and hate crimes. Historically, media portrayals of trans women have overwhelmingly relied on common tropes and stereotypes, though this has changed somewhat in the 21st century alongside transgender rights activism.

== Terminology ==
Transgender (commonly abbreviated to trans) is an umbrella term for people whose gender identity or gender expression are different from those typically associated with members of the sex they were assigned at birth. Transgender women are women who were assigned the male sex at birth (AMAB), but who identify and live as women.

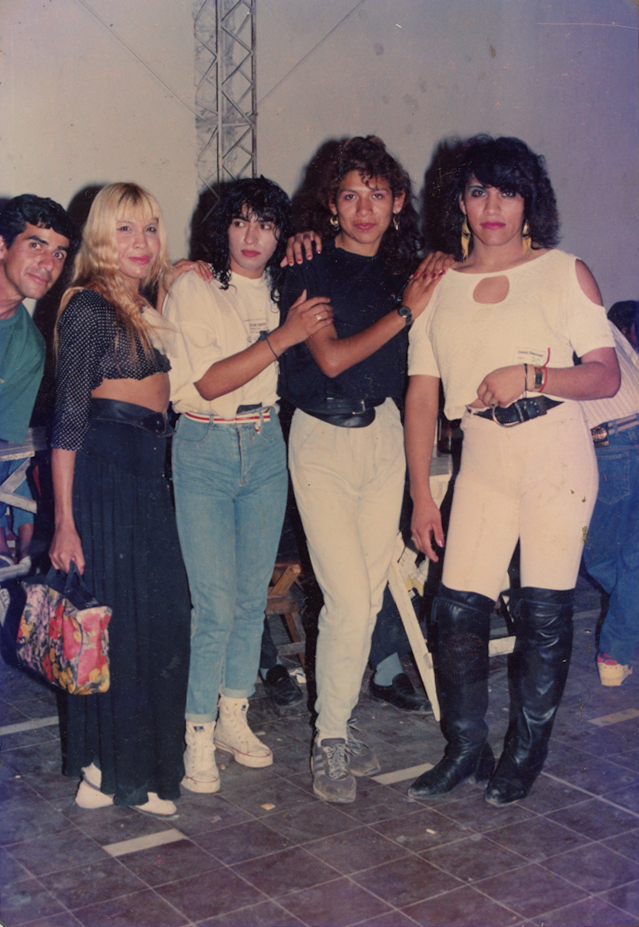
Travestis in Salta, Argentina, in 1988.

The older term transsexual refers to the subset of trans people who desire to medically transition. The term originated in medicine and psychology in the 1960s, and was largely displaced by transgender. It is now typically considered outdated, though some trans women still identify as transsexual in addition to or instead of transgender.

Transfeminine (commonly abbreviated to both transfem and transfemme) is a broader umbrella term for AMAB people with a predominantly feminine identity or gender expression. This includes trans women, but also some AMAB non-binary people, whose identity may be feminine but not entirely female.

The closed compound (one word) spelling transwoman is sometimes used interchangeably with trans woman, but is often associated with the gender-critical or anti-trans belief that trans women are not women, and thus require a separate word to describe them. For this reason, many transgender people find the spelling offensive. Some prefer to omit trans, and be called simply women. Older terms sometimes still seen are male-to-female (MTF, M2F), but these are outdated.

=== In other languages ===
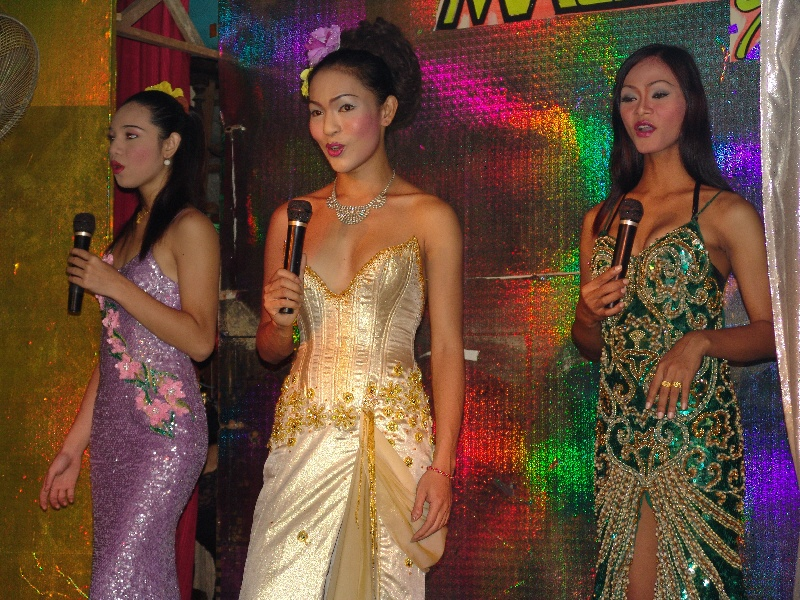
Kathoeys on the stage of a cabaret show in Pattaya

In several Latin American countries, the word travesti is sometimes used to designate people who have been assigned male sex at birth, but develop a female gender identity. The use of travesti precedes transgender in the region; its distinction from trans woman is controversial and can vary depending on the context, ranging from considering it a regional equivalent to a third gender.

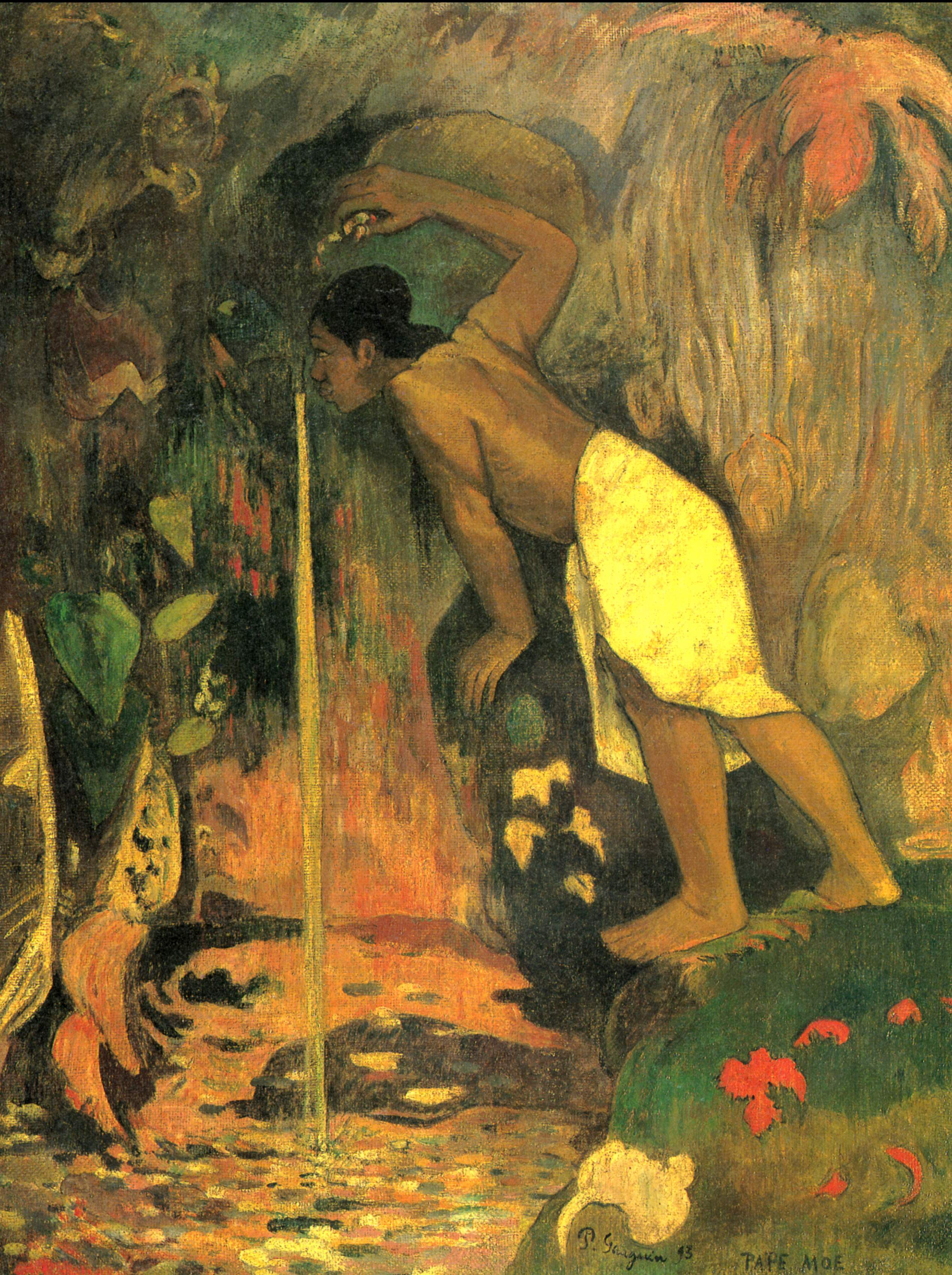
Papa Moe (Mysterious Water), an oil painting by Paul Gauguin from 1893. It depicts a māhū in Tahiti drinking from a waterfall.

In Thailand, kathoey refers to a transfeminine individual, though the term "transgender" is infrequently used to refer to those with this identity. The term is sometimes translated to "ladyboy" in English. Most transfeminine Thai individuals simply referred to themselves as women, or phuying praphet song, meaning "another type of woman."

Amongst Native Hawaiians and Tahitians, māhū are people of a third gender who possess spiritual and social roles. The term has historically been applied to people assigned male at birth, but now may refer to a large variety of gender identities. The term is sometimes seen as disparaging or a pejorative, similar to faggot.

== Sexuality ==
Trans women vary greatly in terms of sexual and romantic orientation. A survey of roughly 3,000 American trans women showed 31% of them identifying as bisexual, 29% as "gay/lesbian/same-gender", 23% as heterosexual, 7% as asexual, as well as 7% identifying as "queer" and 2% as "other." A 12-month survey of trans women in Europe found that 22% identified as heterosexual, 10% were attracted almost exclusively to men, 3% were mostly attracted to men, 9% were bisexual, 7% were mostly attracted to women, 23% were almost attracted exclusively to women, and 20% were lesbian. A smaller 2013 study of Italian trans women found that 82% identified as heterosexual.

The European study found that sexual orientation did not change over the 12 months. A 2018 study found that the most common sexual partner for trans women was cisgender women prior to transitioning. Trans women who had been transitioning for ten years or more were more likely to report a shift in their sexual orientation.

In a 2008 study, no statistically significant difference in libido was detected between trans women and cisgender women. As in males, female libido is thought to correlate with serum testosterone levels (with some controversy) but the 2008 study found no such correlation in trans women. Another study, published in 2014, found that 62.4% of trans women reported their sexual desire had decreased after sexual reassignment therapy.

== Healthcare ==
=== Gender-affirming care ===
Gender-affirming care for trans women may include feminizing hormone therapy, transgender voice therapy, and gender-affirming surgery (often referring to vaginoplasty, but may also include tracheal shave, orchiectomy, facial feminization surgery, breast augmentation, and vulvoplasty).

==== Feminizing hormone therapy ====
Feminizing hormone therapy is a type of hormone therapy focused on turning the secondary sex characteristics of a person from masculine to feminine. Feminizing hormone therapy often includes a mix of estrogens, antiandrogens, progestogens, and gonadotropin-releasing hormone modulator, though the most common approach is an estrogen in combination with an antiandrogen. Feminizing hormone therapy can induce effects including breast development, softening of the skin, redistribution of body fat towards a gynoid fat distribution, decreased muscle mass/strength, and changes in mood.

==== Feminizing voice therapy ====
Some trans women may seek to feminize their voice through transgender voice therapy, as hormone therapy does not significantly affect the voice of trans women. The aim of voice therapy (in the context of transitioning) is frequently to change the fundamental frequency, resonant frequency, and phonatory pattern to reflect that of cisgender women. This can be accomplished through speech therapy, or surgeries (including feminization laryngoplasty). Throughout multiple studies, voice therapy has generally been shown to increase vocal satisfaction of the patient and a greater listener perception of a feminine voice.

==== Gender-affirming surgery ====
Trans women may undergo a variety of gender-affirming surgeries as part of their transition process. These surgeries may include vaginoplasty, vulvoplasty, orchiectomy, breast augmentation, and facial feminization surgery.

=== Fertility ===
While the relationship is not completely understood, feminizing hormone therapy appears to reduce the ability to produce sperm. Individuals who have been on hormone therapy for an extended period of time have been shown to have a lower total sperm count than males not on hormone therapy. Cessation of hormone replacement therapy has been associated with a renewed level of fertility.

Tucking is also associated with lower quality sperm production because of the increased temperature of the testicles, causing premature sperm death.

Trans women may elect to undergo fertility preservation through semen cryopreservation.

== Discrimination ==
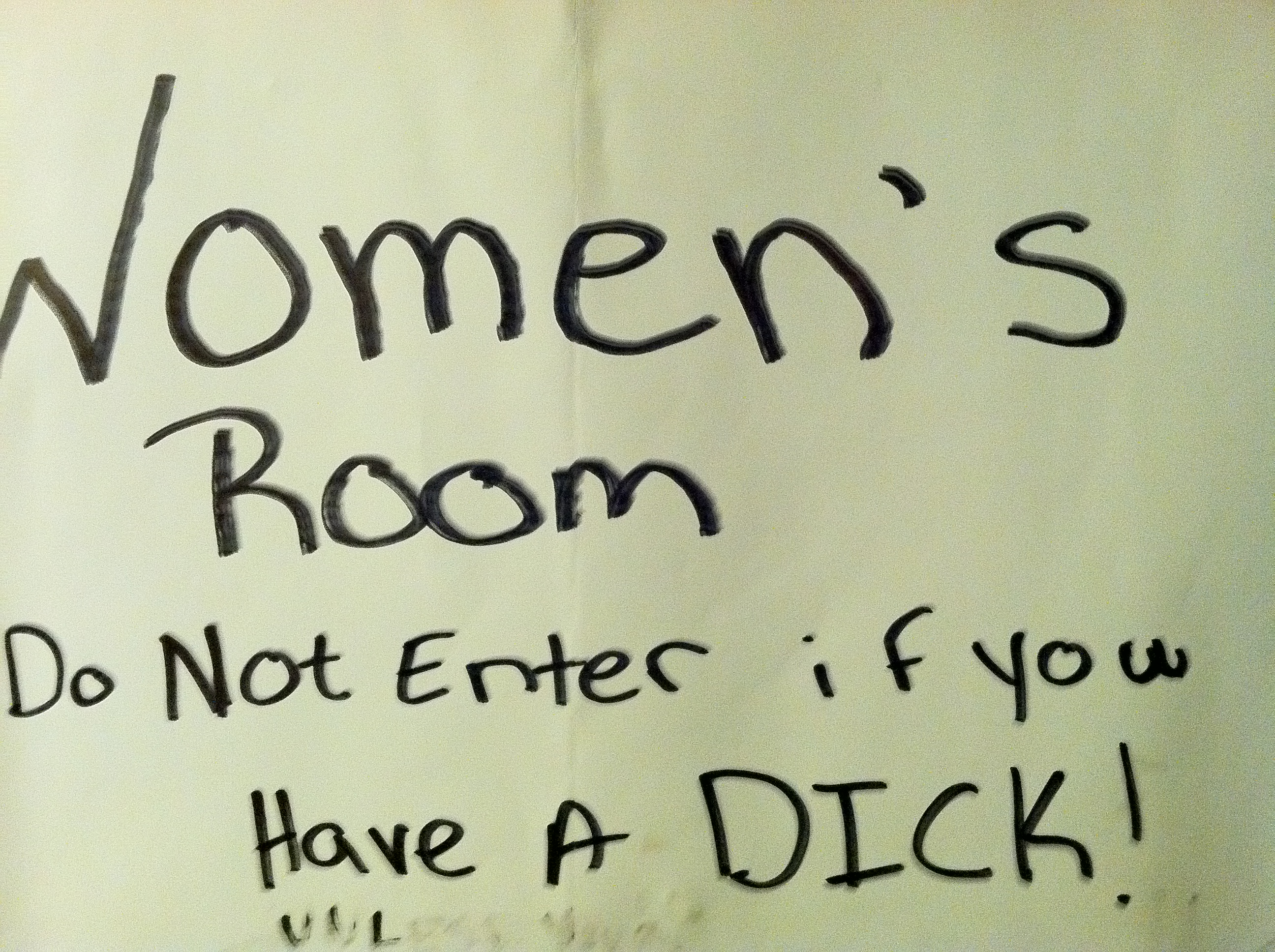
Transmisogynistic graffiti in Springfield, Missouri, 2011

Like all gender variant people, trans women often face discrimination and transphobia, particularly those who are not perceived as cisgender. A 2015 survey from The Williams Institute found that, of 27,715 transgender respondents, 52% whose families had rejected them attempted suicide, as did 64.9% of those who were physically attacked in the past year.

A 2011 survey of roughly 3000 trans women living in the United States, as summarized in the report "Injustice at Every Turn: A Report of the National Transgender Discrimination Survey", found trans women reported that:

- 36% have lost their job due to their gender.
- 55% have been discriminated against in hiring.
- 29% have been denied a promotion.
- 24% have been refused medical care.
- 60% of the trans women who have visited a homeless shelter reported incidents of harassment there.
- When displaying identity documents incongruent with their gender identity/expression, 33% have been harassed and 3% have been physically assaulted.
- 20% reported harassment by police, with 6% reporting physical assault and 3% reporting sexual assault by an officer. 25% have been treated generally with disrespect by police officers.
- Among jailed trans women, 40% have been harassed by inmates, 38% have been harassed by staff, 21% have been physically assaulted, and 20% have been sexually assaulted.

The American National Coalition of Anti-Violence Programs' report of 2010 anti-LGBTQ violence found that of the 27 people who were murdered because of their LGBTQ identity, 44% were trans women. Discrimination is particularly severe towards non-white trans women, who experience the intersection of racism and transphobia.

In her book Whipping Girl, trans woman Julia Serano refers to the unique discrimination trans women experience as "transmisogyny".

Discrimination against trans women has occurred at the Michigan Womyn's Music Festival after the Festival set out a rule that it would only be a space for cisgender females. This led to protests by trans women and their allies, and a boycott of the Festival by Equality Michigan in 2014. The boycott was joined by the Human Rights Campaign and GLAAD. The National Center for Lesbian Rights, and the National LGBTQ Task Force also signed on to the boycott but later withdrew support. The "womyn-born-womyn" intention first came to attention in 1991 after a transsexual festival-goer, Nancy Burkholder, was asked to leave the festival when several women recognized her as a trans woman and expressed discomfort with her presence in the space.

=== Violence towards trans women ===
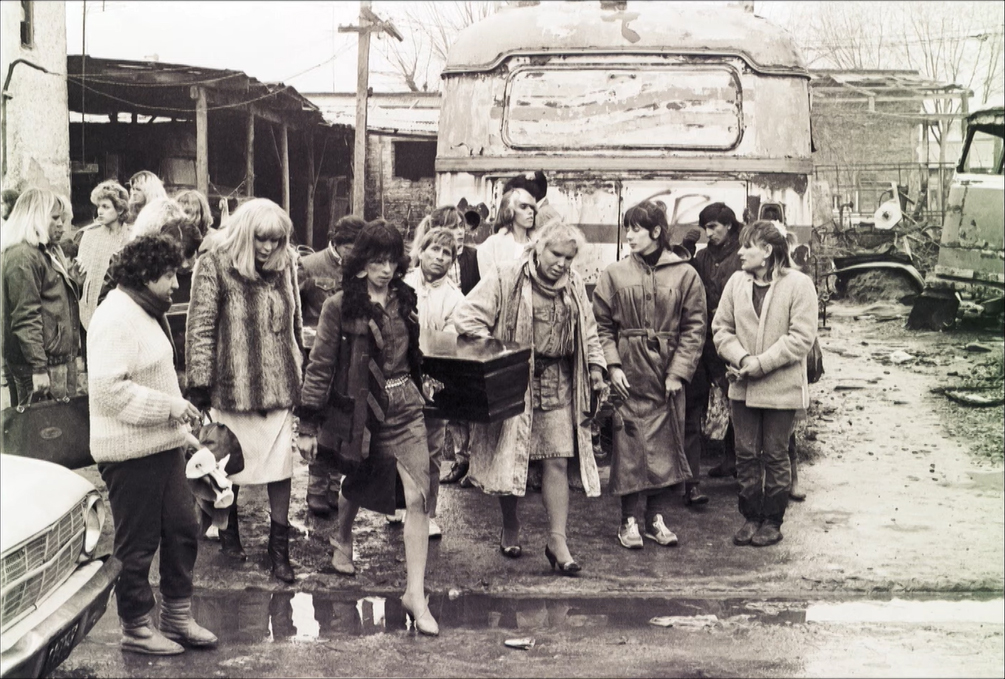
A group of Argentine travestis carrying the coffin of their murdered friend, August 1987

Trans women face a form of violence sometimes called trans bashing. The Washington Blade reported that Global Rights, an international NGO, tracked the mistreatment of trans women in Brazil, including at the hands of the police. To commemorate those who have been murdered in hate crimes, Transgender Day of Remembrance is observed every year on November 20th. Local queer community centers and organizations may hold candlelight vigils or other in-person gatherings on Transgender Day of Remembrance.

==== United States ====
According to a 2009 report by the National Coalition of Anti-Violence Programs, quoted by the Office for Victims of Crime, 11% of all hate crimes towards members of the LGBTQ community were directed towards trans women.

According to Trans Murder Monitoring, between October 1, 2022, and September 30, 2023, 321 trans and gender-diverse individuals were killed, with trans women or transfeminine individuals accounting for 94% of the deaths.

In 2015, a false statistic was widely reported in the United States media stating that the life expectancy of trans women of color is only 35 years. This appears to be based on a comment specifically about Latin America in a report by the Inter-American Commission on Human Rights, which compiled data on the age at death of murdered trans women for all of the Americas (North, South, and Central), and does not disaggregate by race.

In 2016, 23 transgender people suffered fatal attacks in the United States. The Human Rights Campaign report found some of these deaths to be direct results of an anti-transgender bias, and some due to related factors such as homelessness.

One type of violence towards trans women is committed by perpetrators who learn that their sexual partner is transgender, and feel deceived ("trans panic"). Almost 95% of these crimes were committed by cisgender men towards trans women. According to a 2005 study in Houston, Texas, "50% of transgender people surveyed had been hit by a primary partner after coming out as transgender".

== Media representation ==
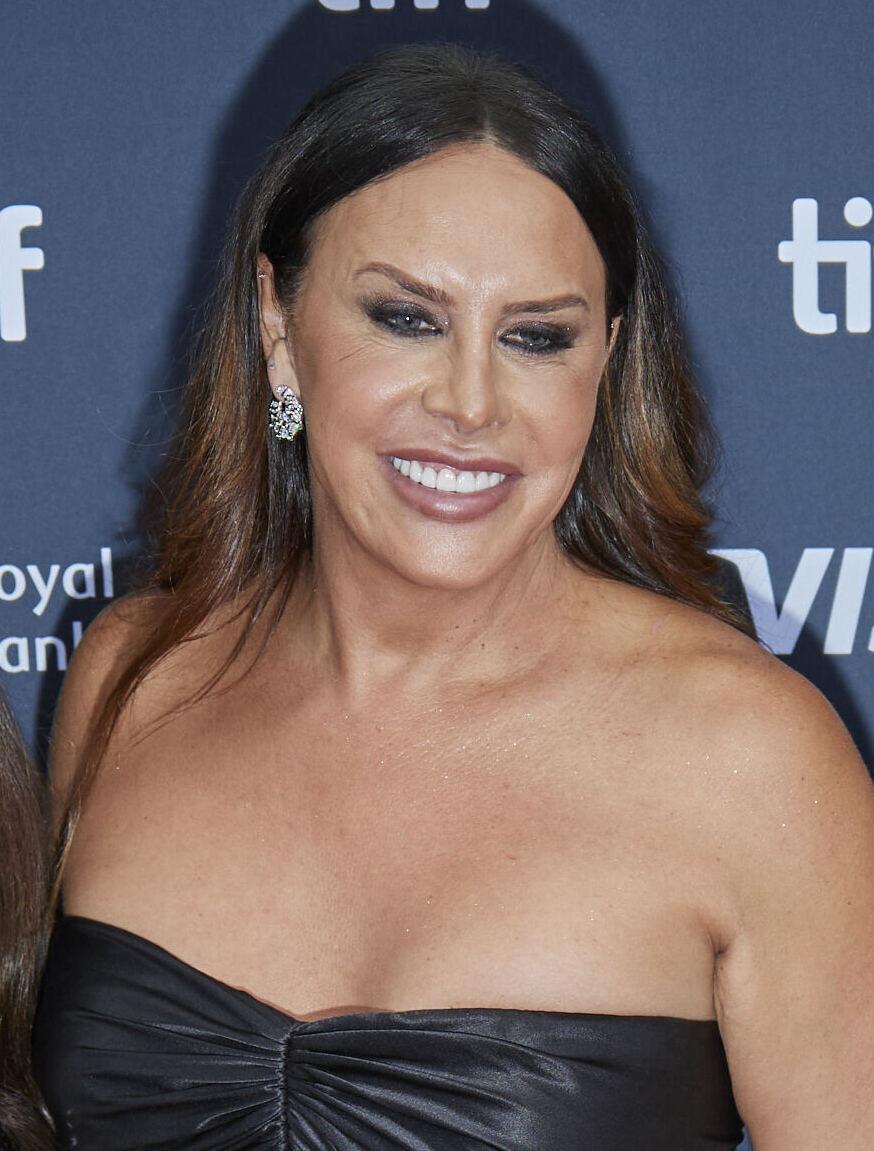
Karla Sofía Gascón, the first openly trans woman nominated for an acting Academy Award

Trans representation in television, film, news, and other forms of media was slim before the 21st century. Early mainstream accounts and fictional depictions of trans women almost always relied on common tropes and stereotypes. However, portrayals have steadily grown and improved in tandem with activism.

The first documentary by a trans woman on trans issues was Kristiene Clarke's film Sex Change: Shock! Horror! Probe! released on British television in 1988. The title was chosen to "ridicule the tabloid headlines at the time."

In the 2020 film Disclosure: Trans Lives on Screen, director Sam Feder explores Hollywood's history of trans representation and the cultural effects of such depictions. Many notable 21st century trans actresses and celebrities shared their stories in the film, including Laverne Cox, Alexandra Billings, Hari Nef, Jamie Clayton, AJ Clementine, and more.

Some famous trans women in television include Laverne Cox (playing Sophia Burset on Orange is the New Black), Hunter Schafer (playing Jules Vaughn in Euphoria), Josie Totah, Cho Hyun-ju (from Squid Game), and Caitlyn Jenner (from Keeping Up with the Kardashians). Pose, an American television show, depicts the lives of several trans women.

Karla Sofía Gascón became the first openly trans person to receive acting nominations at the Academy Awards, BAFTAs & SAGs and win the Best Actress award at the Cannes Film Festival for her performance as Emilia Pérez / Juan "Manitas" Del Monte in the 2024 film Emilia Pérez.

Alex Consani became the first trans woman to win as Model of the Year at The Fashion Awards.

== See also ==
- List of transgender people
- Outline of transgender topics
- Trans man
- Transgender people in sports

== Bibliography ==
- Grant, Jaime M.; Mottet, Lisa A.; Tanis, Justin; Harrison, Jack; Herman, Jody L.; Keisling, Mara (3 February 2011). "Injustice at Every Turn: A Report of the National Transgender Discrimination Survey" (PDF). National Gay and Lesbian Task Force. National Center for Transgender Equality. Archived (PDF) from the original on 22 August 2024.
