= Tucking =

Technique for hiding one's genital bulge

Tucking is a technique whereby an individual hides the crotch bulge of their penis and scrotum so that they are not conspicuous through clothing.

The practice is most commonly employed by men, transgender women, and men who do drag, as well as non-binary people who are assigned male, or otherwise desire a more androgynous appearance. There are fertility-related side-effects to tucking, such as a reduced sperm count. Some types of clothing, such as gaffs and boxers, are purposefully designed to conceal the crotch bulge.

== Methods ==
One method of tucking involves pulling the penis backwards in between the legs while simultaneously pushing the testicles up into the inguinal canal. In order to secure this position in place, some practitioners may use especially tight undergarments and a leotard that has a strap. Another practice is the flattening or binding by using tape to fasten the genitalia along the perineum and if possible in between the buttocks. There are also improvised or home-made contrivances whereby an elastic waistband is cut off from an existing garment and then a pouch placed along the middle to then be pulled up.

Some people use purpose-made panty-like garments, often called gaffs, that serve to hide the genitalia and provide a feminine flat and smooth crotch area.

== Other ==
The practice of tucking is also observed for reasons other than appearing female, done in different manners. Some people do it because they have dysmorphophobia with regards to their genital bulge. For other people, it is due to feeling embarrassment, while others do it to hide an erection, to "not scare women" out of a sense of prudishness or phallophobia or because the bulge is prominent at an inappropriate moment. Methods of tucking include placing the penis behind the waistband sometimes colloquially referred to as uptuck while some people may wear purposefully designed compressing underwear. Variations of tucking may be used by macrophallic people when they perceive their crotch bulge to have an obscene appearance. There are some types of boxer shorts and boxer briefs that are designed to conceal the male crotch bulge, such as bloxers.

== Health effects ==
Placing testicles closer to the body increases their regulating temperature. This causes heat stress on the sperm inside the testicles, often leading to premature death of the sperm and lower the sperm count. In rare instances, tucking has been reported to lead to testicular torsion.
