= Gaff (clothing) =

Garment that reduces the bulge of external genitalia

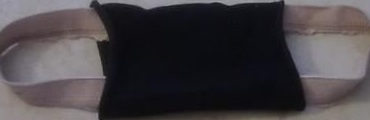
A homemade gaff

A gaff is a piece of fabric, usually augmented by an elastic such as a rubber band, that is designed to reduce the bulge of external genitals and make the groin appear smoother and flatter. It is usually worn by people who were assigned male at birth (AMAB) who wish to wear feminine clothing, including some trans women and some gender-non-conforming and nonbinary people.

== Description ==
Gaffs are underwear that are designed to smooth and compress the groin. They are a form of femme shapewear, compression underwear, or tucking undergarment. They can be used for tucking, by helping keep a penis and testicles pulled back for a smooth appearance. Gaffs are similar in some ways to thongs, and can be worn beneath any other pair of underwear. Some gaffs are only meant to be used for tucking, while others can be used for untucked external genitals.

== Design ==
Traditionally, gaffs have been DIY creations because they were not available as a commercial lingerie offering. A common method of making a gaff uses a section of a single sock and an elastic band, such as the waistband of underwear. The elastic band is placed through the sock section resulting in two loops which become leg openings such that the elastic can be pulled over the hips. This results in the sock section being pulled taut through the crotch with enough force to hold a downward-tucked penis and inguinally inserted testes in place. Some gaffs are designed with tubes or pouches to hold a penis.

Other DIY techniques may be used, such as cutting out the top of a pair of pantyhose in place of using an elastic band. To achieve a similar effect without modifying garments, tight-fitting underwear, shapewear, or bikini bottoms may be used instead.

Since the 2010s, underwear manufacturers have begun to design underwear with the same function as gaffs. Many were initially designed with compression mesh or swimwear material. Early gaff designers had varying goals, including prioritizing sexiness, comfort, playful and affirming wear, or uniqueness. As of 2022, gaffs can be purchased at specialty shops and online.

== Use ==
Gaffs may be more comfortable than tape-based methods of tucking in that they are much easier to remove and may be less irritating to skin, as well as less painful upon removal. Their ease of use may reduce the likelihood that wearers need to hold their bladders, making bladder infections less likely. Because gaffs are often made of non-breathable synthetic materials, they can harbor bacteria if not cleaned correctly.

Typically, commercially-manufactured gaffs are cleaned by washing them in cold water and hanging them to dry.

Users of DIY gaffs say they can be uncomfortable.
