= Chondrolaryngoplasty =

Surgical procedure

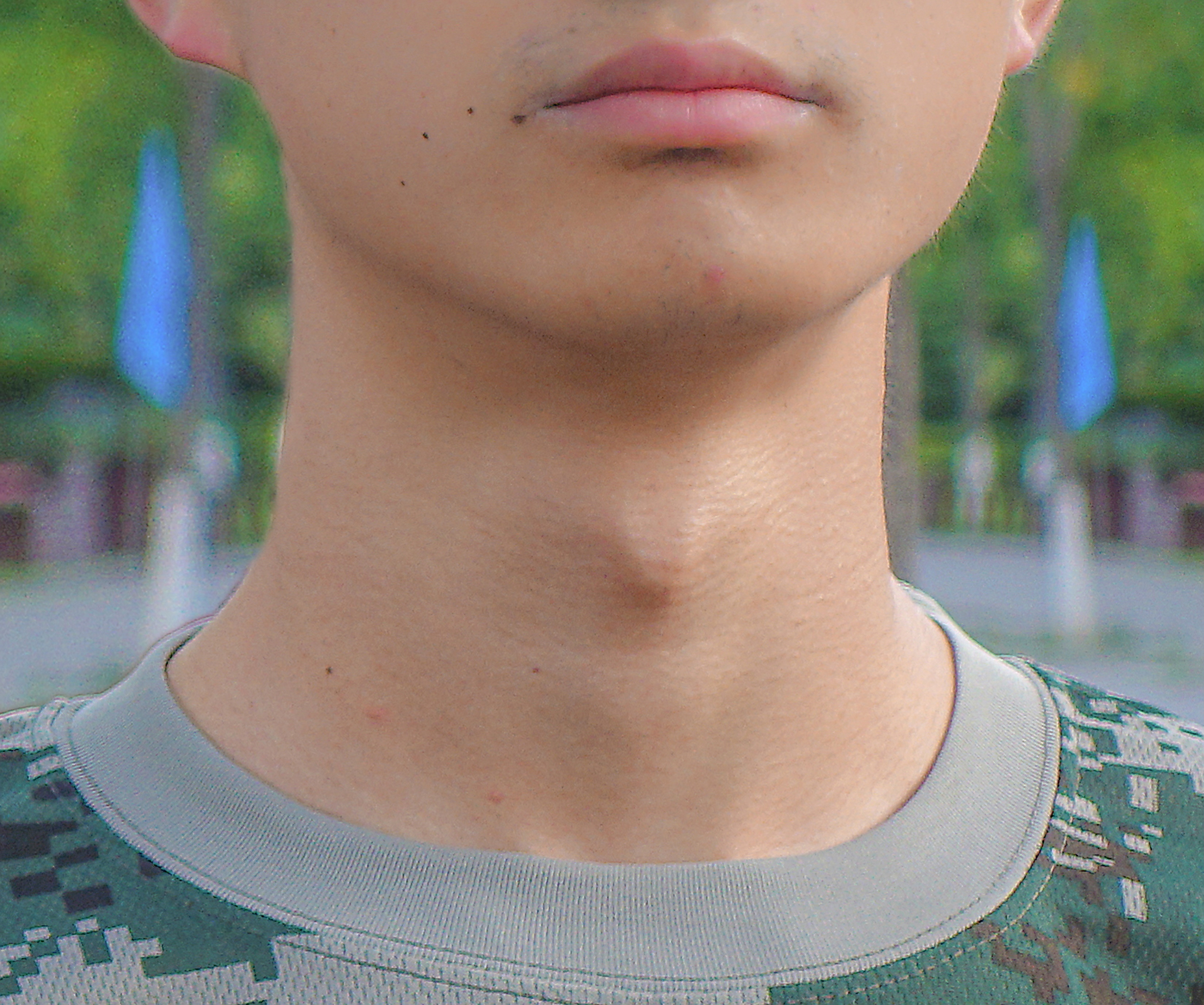
An Adam's apple

Chondrolaryngoplasty (commonly called tracheal shave, but this is a misnomer as the trachea is not involved) is a surgical procedure in which the thyroid cartilage is reduced in size by shaving down the cartilage through an incision in the throat, generally to aid those who are uncomfortable with the girth of their Adam's apple.

An alternative to this procedure is feminization laryngoplasty, albeit this procedure involves additional risks and has an effect on the voice that the patient may not desire.

== Surgery ==
The technique was originally described by Francis G. Wolfort and Richard G. Parry and has been developed since.

After an anesthetic (local or general, depending on whether or not it is the only surgery to be performed) is administered to the patient, a small, horizontal incision is made on the bottom of the Adam's apple. The muscles in the throat are then held apart with forceps, and the protruding cartilage is shaved down with a scalpel, thus making the throat appear smoother and less angular. The incision is then closed with sutures, and a red line will mark the incision for about six weeks. Little scarring occurs in most cases because the surgeon will usually make the incision in one of the minuscule folds of skin that cover the Adam's apple.

Newer versions of this surgery also exist wherein the incision is hidden beneath the chin, or alternatively inside the mouth. In these cases, the tracheal shave is then typically performed endoscopically.

The surgery is usually outpatient unless it is combined with other surgeries that require hospital stays. Particular care must be taken by the surgeon to not remove too much cartilage, as doing so can reduce the structure of the trachea and cause breathing difficulties.

Most surgeons who specialize in gender affirming surgery offer the procedure, and some general plastic surgeons will as well. It is one of the more common surgeries performed on transgender women, along with genital reconstruction.

Due to the proximity of the vocal folds, there is the small possibility that they may be damaged during this type of surgery. Generally, however, the patient's voice is unaffected, although there have been reports of slight change in pitch. Some patients will choose to undergo additional vocal surgery at the same time in order to minimize voice-related dysphoria.

If the patient's voice is affected, they can choose to undergo feminization laryngoplasty to resolve these issues and retighten the vocal folds. Feminization laryngoplasty is also capable of further reducing the Adam's apple after a tracheal shave if the patient finds the reduction done after an initial shave inadequate, as it explicitly removes tissue that is normally avoided by the surgeon during a tracheal shave.

== Recovery ==
It is recommended by many surgeons that the patient frequently rub the site of the incision to prevent noticeable scar tissue from forming. Swelling and bruising around the site of the incision is common, and patients may also experience difficulty swallowing and speaking, to a greater or lesser degree depending on the individual.

The average time for complete recovery is about two weeks, although it can sometimes take longer if the patient has pre-existing medical conditions such as anemia.

The majority of patients are satisfied with the outcome of this surgery. The most common complaints from those unsatisfied are that they still feel that their Adam's apple is too big or that the scar is too noticeable. Issues with the Adam's apple being too big after a tracheal shave can potentially be solved with feminization laryngoplasty.
