= Transgender voice surgery =

Gender-affirming surgery undertaken by transgender people to alter their voice

Transgender voice surgery is a set of surgical procedures used by transgender individuals to modify their vocal characteristics, primarily focusing on raising or lowering vocal pitch to better align with their gender identity. These surgeries alter the existing vocal structure by modifying the vocal folds and surrounding tissues to change pitch, resonance, and overall voice quality.

== Overview ==
While feminizing hormone therapy (HRT) and genital surgery (GAS) can cause a more feminine outward appearance for transgender women, they typically do nothing to alter the pitch of an adult voice or to make the voice sound more feminine, unless HRT is started immediately after puberty blockers during teenage years. The existing vocal structure can be surgically altered to raise vocal pitch by shortening the vocal folds, decreasing the whole mass of the folds, or by increasing the tension of the folds. Transgender women can undergo surgery to raise their vocal pitch as measured by fundamental frequency (F0), to increase their pitch range and to remove access to lower frequency ranges in their voice. The current pitch-raising vocal surgeries can be split-up into several categories.

== Voice feminization surgery ==
Several surgical procedures are currently used to raise vocal pitch and feminize the voice for transgender women. The following sections describe the main types of voice feminization surgeries and associated techniques used to achieve these outcomes.

=== Cricothyroid approximation ===
Cricothyroid approximation (CTA) is a surgical procedure that aims to increase vocal pitch by tensing and elongating the vocal folds. This is achieved by suturing or securing the cricoid cartilage closer to the thyroid cartilage, causing the cricoid to shift backward and upward while the thyroid moves forward and downward. This manipulation mimics the contraction of the cricothyroid muscle, which naturally tenses and elongates the vocal folds, resulting in a higher pitch.

However, this procedure often results in patients being locked into falsetto, and outcomes may deteriorate over time. Additionally, patients frequently lose the ability to use their cricothyroid muscle following surgery. Due to these limitations and associated complications, fewer clinicians perform CTA today.

=== Wendler glottoplasty ===
Wendler glottoplasty is currently the most commonly performed voice feminization surgery. This procedure raises vocal pitch by shortening the vibrating length of the vocal folds. The anterior portion of the vocal folds is surgically removed, and the remaining edges are sutured together to form a nonvibrating anterior web, effectively reducing the vibrating length and thus increasing pitch.

A variation known as Laser Reduction Glottoplasty involves vaporizing the anterior part of the vocal folds using a carbon dioxide laser. The vocal folds are then tensed with sutures, causing an increase in pitch.

An additional variant called Vocal Fold Shortening with Retrodisplacement of the Anterior Commissure (VFSRAC), developed by Hyung-Tae Kim in Seoul, South Korea, involves suturing the glottic web downward in the larynx during surgery. This technique provides further tensioning of the vocal cords and helps preserve the funnel shape of the larynx.

=== Feminization laryngoplasty ===
Feminization laryngoplasty, also known as open laryngoplasty or Femlar/FL, is a surgical technique that modifies the voice by removing portions of both the anterior true and false vocal folds as well as the anterior part of the larynx (voice box). After resection, the larynx is reconstructed using sutures and hardware to reshape the remaining tissues. This approach affects both the physical size of the larynx and the pitch of the voice.

This procedure provides a more significant reduction of the adam's apple compared to the traditional tracheal shave and can also be used to correct complications from previous tracheal shave surgeries that impact vocal pitch. It is commonly combined with a thyrohyoid elevation, which raises the larynx within the neck. Elevating the larynx reduces the length of the pharynx, thereby modifying the resonance of the voice towards typically feminine characteristics.

Despite its potentially greater vocal feminization effects, feminization laryngoplasty is less commonly performed due to its relative novelty, complexity, and increased surgical risks compared to other voice feminization surgeries. At present, only a limited number of surgeons in countries such as the United States, Australia, and Thailand offer this procedure.

Patients undergoing this surgery typically experience a more pronounced increase in pitch and overall feminization of vocal characteristics than with glottoplasty; however, this may not align with every patient's goals. Furthermore, the postoperative recovery period often includes a longer phase of pitch instability associated with the greater surgical complexity.

It is worth noting that some practitioners may use the term feminization laryngoplasty to describe their broader portfolio of voice feminization procedures, even if this specific surgery is not performed.

=== Laser tuning ===
Laser tuning encompasses procedures such as Laser Assisted Voice Adjustment (LAVA) and Vocal Fold Muscle Reduction (VFMR), and is sometimes associated with Laser Reduction Glottoplasty. These interventions involve microlaryngoscopy combined with the use of lasers—commonly a carbon dioxide (CO_{2}) laser or a potassium titanyl phosphate (KTP) laser—that vaporize portions of the vocal folds.

During healing and scarring, the vocal fold tissue decreases in mass and increases in stiffness, leading to a rise in vocal pitch. VFMR vaporizes a larger portion of the vocal folds, including the underlying muscle, whereas LAVA is limited to more superficial layers making it less invasive.

Laser tuning procedures are typically performed as adjuncts to primary feminization surgeries such as feminization laryngoplasty or glottoplasty because their impact alone is often minimal for typical male-to-female transgender patients, although VFMR may occasionally be performed in isolation. The term Laser Reduction Glottoplasty (LRG) is sometimes used interchangeably with these procedures, either with or without concurrent creation of a glottic web, depending on the surgical context.

=== Resonance surgery ===
Resonance surgery describes surgical techniques aimed at modifying the vocal tract to produce a more feminine resonance and timbre. These include procedures such as thyrohyoid elevation, commonly performed in combination with feminization laryngoplasty, which raises the larynx within the neck, shortening the vocal tract and thereby modifying voice resonance characteristics.

Additionally, pharyngeal narrowing surgery involves excising tissue from the posterior pharynx to reduce the size of the pharyngeal resonance cavity, further contributing to a more typically feminine vocal quality.

=== Surgery considerations for transgender women ===
Usually, transgender women consider vocal surgery when they feel dissatisfied with voice therapy results, or when they want a more authentic sounding feminine voice. However, vocal surgery alone may not produce a voice that sounds completely feminine, and voice therapy may still be needed. Negative effects from these surgeries have been noted, including reduced voice quality, reduced vocal loudness, negative effects on swallowing and/or breathing, sore throat, infections and scarring. A positive effect of surgery can be protecting the voice from damage due to the strain of constantly elevating pitch while speaking. Because of the risks, vocal surgery is often considered a last resort after vocal therapy has been pursued.

=== Efficacy and outcomes in voice feminization surgery ===
Early studies on voice feminization interventions reported mixed and sometimes inconclusive results, with concerns about variability in outcomes and uncertain links between pitch elevation and patient satisfaction. Recent evidence from a large systematic review and meta-analysis, however, shows that both voice therapy and surgical procedures consistently lead to increased vocal pitch and improved quality of life for transgender women, with surgical techniques generally producing larger and more permanent effects. The study further found a strong association between objective pitch changes and positive patient-reported outcomes, clarifying previous uncertainties and supporting the effectiveness of these interventions as part of gender-affirming care.

== Voice masculinization surgery ==
As for transgender men, it is generally presumed that hormone therapy does successfully masculinize the voice and lower vocal pitch. However, this may not be the case for all transgender men. Although it is far less common, surgery to lower vocal pitch does exist and may be considered if traditional hormone therapy did not adequately lower it. Medialization laryngoplasty (or masculinization laryngoplasty) is a procedure where the vocal fold contours are medially augmented with the injection of silastic implants. This mimics the changes that the vocal folds non-transgender men go through during puberty, which causes a lower sounding voice.

== Controversy ==
Professional opinion is mixed regarding the use of vocal surgery. There is currently a lack of outcome data, particularly longitudinal data, for pitch-elevating surgery, and outcomes have not been well-monitored over time. Because of this, some SLPs do not think that phonosurgery is a viable treatment option. Others believe it is, and still others believe it should be considered only as a "last resort" after the desired pitch change has not been seen in therapy. Critics cite variability in outcome, lack of outcome data, and reported negative effects like compromised voice quality, decreased vocal loudness, adverse impact on swallowing/breathing, sore throat, wound infection, and scarring as reasons to avoid vocal surgery. Proponents argue that surgery may protect a person's voice from damage caused by repetitive strain to elevate pitch in therapy. Ultimately, the decision to undergo surgery is up to the patient, with input from a knowledgeable physician and SLP.

== See also ==
- Transgender voice therapy
