= Vocal cords =

Folds of throat tissues that help to create n through vocalization

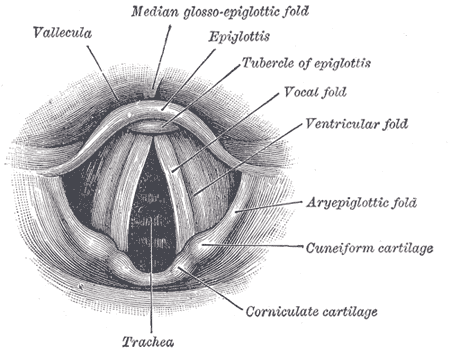
- Laryngoscopic view of the vocal folds.

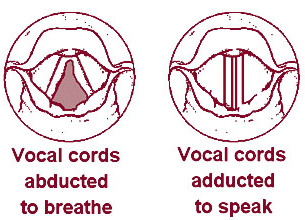
- Abduction and adduction

Details
- Precursor: Sixth pharyngeal arch
- System: Respiratory system

Identifiers
- Latin: plica vocalis
- MeSH: D014827
- TA98: A06.2.09.013
- TA2: 3198
- FMA: 55457

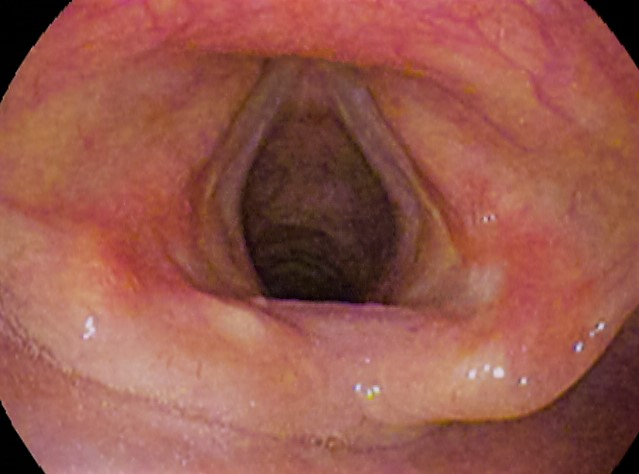
Vocal folds (open)

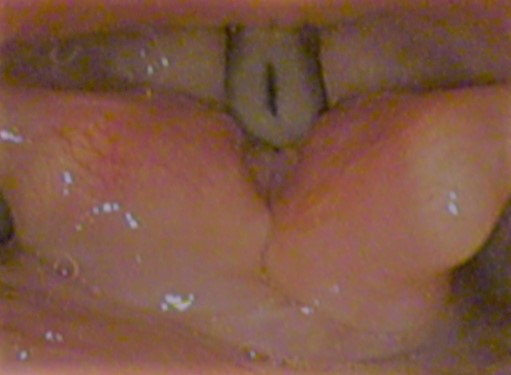
Vocal folds (speaking)

The vocal cords, also known as vocal folds, are folds of throat tissues that are key in creating sounds through vocalization. The length of the vocal cords affects the pitch of voice, similar to a stringed musical instrument. Open when breathing and vibrating for speech or singing, the folds are controlled via the recurrent laryngeal branch of the vagus nerve. They are composed of twin infoldings of mucous membrane stretched horizontally, from back to front, across the larynx. They vibrate, modulating the flow of air being expelled from the lungs during phonation.

The 'true vocal cords' are distinguished from the 'false vocal folds', known as vestibular folds or ventricular folds, which sit slightly superior to the more delicate true folds. These have a minimal role in normal phonation, but can produce deep sonorous tones, screams and growls.

The length of the vocal fold at birth is approximately six to eight millimeters and grows to its adult length of eight to sixteen millimeters by adolescence. DHT, an androgen metabolite of testosterone which is secreted by the gonads, causes changes in the cartilages and musculature of the larynx when present in high enough concentrations, such as during an adolescent boy's puberty: The thyroid prominence appears, the vocal folds lengthen and become rounded, and the epithelium thickens with the formation of three distinct layers in the lamina propria.. These changes are only partially reversible via reconstructive surgery such as chondrolaryngoplasty, feminization laryngoplasty, and laser tuning of the vocal cords.

== Structure ==
=== Location ===
The vocal folds are located within the larynx at the top of the trachea. They are attached at the back to the arytenoid cartilages, and at the front to the thyroid cartilage via Broyles ligament. They are part of the glottis. Their outer edges are attached to muscle in the larynx while their inner edges form an opening called the rima glottidis. They are constructed from epithelium, but they have a few muscle-fibres in them, namely the vocalis muscle which tightens the front part of the ligament near to the thyroid cartilage. They are flat triangular bands and are pearly white in color. Above both sides of the glottis are the two vestibular folds or false vocal folds which have a small sac between them.

=== False vocal folds ===
The vocal folds are sometimes called 'true vocal folds' to distinguish them from the 'false vocal folds' known as vestibular folds or ventricular folds. These are a pair of thick folds of mucous membrane that protect and sit slightly higher to the more delicate true folds. They have a minimal role in normal phonation, but are often used to produce deep sonorous tones in Tibetan chant and Tuvan throat singing, as well as in musical screaming and the death growl vocal style.

=== Microanatomy ===
The vocal cords are composed of twin infoldings of 3 distinct tissues: an outer layer of flat cells that do not produce keratin (squamous epithelium). Below this is the superficial layer of the lamina propria, a gel-like layer, which allows the vocal fold to vibrate and produce sound. The vocalis and thyroarytenoid muscles make up the deepest portion. These vocal folds are covered with a mucous membrane and are stretched horizontally, from back to front, across the larynx.

=== Variation ===
Males and females have different vocal fold sizes. Adult male voices are usually lower-pitched due to longer and thicker folds. The male's vocal folds are between 1.75 cm and 2.5 cm (approx 0.75" to 1.0") in length, while females' vocal folds are between 1.25 cm and 1.75 cm (approx 0.5" to 0.75") in length. The vocal folds of children are much shorter than those of adult males and females. The difference in vocal fold length and thickness between males and females causes a difference in vocal pitch. Additionally, genetic factors cause variations between members of the same sex, with males' and females' voices being categorized into voice types.

== Development ==
=== In newborns ===
Newborns have a uniform single layered lamina propria, which appears loose with no vocal ligament. The monolayered lamina propria is composed of ground substances such as hyaluronic acid and fibronectin, fibroblasts, elastic fibers, and collagenous fibers. While the fibrous components are sparse, making the lamina propria structure loose, the hyaluronic acid (HA) content is high.

HA is a bulky, negatively charged glycosaminoglycan, whose strong affinity with water procures hyaluronic acid its viscoelastic and shock absorbing properties essential to vocal biomechanics. Viscosity and elasticity are critical to voice production. Chan, Gray and Titze, quantified the effect of hyaluronic acid on both the viscosity and the elasticity of vocal folds by comparing the properties of tissues with and without HA. The results showed that removal of hyaluronic acid decreased the stiffness of the vocal cords by an average of 35%, but increased their dynamic viscosity by an average of 70% at frequencies higher than 1 Hz. Newborns have been shown to cry an average of 6.7 hours per day during the first 3 months, with a sustained pitch of 400–600 Hz, and a mean duration per day of 2 hours. Similar treatment on adult vocal cords would quickly result in edema, and subsequently aphonia. Schweinfurth and al. presented the hypothesis that high hyaluronic acid content and distribution in newborn vocal cords is directly associated with newborn crying endurance. These differences in newborn vocal fold composition would also be responsible for newborns inability to articulate sounds, besides the fact that their lamina propria is a uniform structure with no vocal ligament. The layered structure necessary for phonation will start to develop during the infancy and until the adolescence.

The fibroblasts in the newborn Reinke's space are immature, showing an oval shape, and a large nucleus-cytoplasm ratio. The rough endoplasmic reticulum and Golgi apparatus, as shown by electron micrographs, are not well developed, indicating that the cells are in a resting phase. The collagenous and reticular fibers in the newborn the vocal cords are fewer than in the adult one, adding to the immaturity of the vocal fold tissue.

In the infant, many fibrous components were seen to extend from the macula flava towards the Reinke's space. Fibronectin is very abundant in the Reinke's space of newborn and infant. Fibronectin is a glycoprotein that is believed to act as a template for the oriented deposition of the collagen fibers, stabilizing the collagen fibrils. Fibronectin also acts as a skeleton for the elastic tissue formation. Reticular and collagenous fibers were seen to run along the edges of the vocal cords throughout the entire lamina propria. Fibronectin in the Reinke's space appeared to guide those fibers and orient the fibril deposition. The elastic fibers remained sparse and immature during infancy, mostly made of microfibrils. The fibroblasts in the infant Reinke's space were still sparse but spindle-shaped. Their rough endoplasmic reticulum and Golgi apparatus were still not well developed, indicating that despite the change in shape, the fibroblasts still remained mostly in a resting phase. Few newly released materials were seen adjacent to the fibroblasts. The ground substance content in the infant Reinke's space seemed to decrease over time, as the fibrous component content increased, thus slowly changing the vocal fold structure.

=== Children ===
The infant lamina propria is composed of only one layer, as compared to three in the adult, and there is no vocal ligament. The vocal ligament begins to be present in children at about four years of age. Two layers appear in the lamina propria between the ages of six and twelve, and the mature lamina propria, with the superficial, intermediate and deep layers, is only present by the conclusion of adolescence. As vocal fold vibration is a foundation for vocal formants, this presence or absence of tissue layers influences a difference in the number of formants between the adult and pediatric populations. In females, the voice is three tones lower than the child's and has five to twelve formants, as opposed to the pediatric voice with three to six. The length of the vocal fold at birth is approximately six to eight millimeters and grows to its adult length of eight to sixteen millimeters by adolescence. The infant vocal fold is half membranous or anterior glottis, and half cartilaginous or posterior glottis. The adult fold is approximately three-fifths membranous and two-fifths cartilaginous.

=== Puberty ===
Puberty usually lasts from 2 to 5 years, and typically occurs between the ages of 12 and 17. During puberty, voice change is controlled by sex hormones. In females during puberty, the vocal muscle thickens slightly, but remains very supple and narrow. The squamous mucosa also differentiates into three distinct layers (the lamina propria) on the free edge of the vocal folds. The sub- and supraglottic glandular mucosa becomes hormone-dependent to estrogens and progesterone. For females, the actions of estrogens and progesterone produce changes in the extravascular spaces by increasing capillary permeability which allows the passage of intracapillary fluids to the interstitial space as well as modification of glandular secretions. Estrogens have a hypertrophic and proliferative effect on mucosa by reducing the desquamating effect on the superficial layers. The thyroid hormones also affect dynamic function of the vocal folds; (Hashimoto's thyroiditis affects the fluid balance in the vocal folds). Progesterone has an anti-proliferative effect on mucosa and accelerates desquamation. It causes a menstrual-like cycle in the vocal fold epithelium and a drying out of the mucosa with a reduction in secretions of the glandular epithelium. Progesterone has a diuretic effect and decreases capillary permeability, thus trapping the extracellular fluid out of the capillaries and causing tissue congestion.

Testosterone, an androgen secreted by the testes, will cause changes in the cartilages and musculature of the larynx for males during puberty, and to a lesser extent to females assigned at birth and others such as intersex individuals as well as those who are androgen deficient if they are given masculinizing hormone therapy. In females, androgens are secreted principally by the adrenal cortex and the ovaries and can have irreversible masculinizing effects if present in high enough concentration. In males, they are essential to male sexuality. In muscles, they cause a hypertrophy of striated muscles with a reduction in the fat cells in skeletal muscles, and a reduction in the whole body fatty mass. Androgens are the most important hormones responsible for the passage of the boy-child voice to adult male voice, and the change is irreversible without reconstructive surgery such as feminization laryngoplasty. The thyroid prominence, which contains the vocal cords appears, the vocal folds lengthen and become rounded, and the epithelium thickens with the formation of three distinct layers in the lamina propria. These changes are also irreversible without surgery, albeit the thyroid/laryngeal prominence, also known as an Adam's apple can be potentially diminished via a tracheal shave or feminization laryngoplasty.

=== Adulthood ===
Human vocal cords are paired structures located in the larynx, just above the trachea, which vibrate and are brought in contact during phonation. The human vocal cords are roughly 12–24 mm in length, and 3–5 mm thick. Histologically, the human vocal cords are a laminated structure composed of five different layers. The vocalis muscle, main body of the vocal cords, is covered by the mucosa, which consists of the epithelium and the lamina propria. The latter is a pliable layer of connective tissue subdivided into three layers: the superficial layer (SL), the intermediate layer (IL), and the deep layer (DL). Layer distinction is either made looking at differential in cell content or extracellular matrix (extracellular matrix) content. The most common way being to look at the extracellular matrix content. The SLP has fewer elastic and collagenous fibers than the two other layers, and thus is looser and more pliable. The ILP is mostly composed of elastic fibers, while the DLP has fewer elastic fibers, and more collagenous fibers. In those two layers, which form what is known as the vocalis ligament, the elastic and collagenous fibers are densely packed as bundles that run almost parallel to the edge of the vocal fold.

There is a steady increase in the elastin content of the lamina propria as humans age (elastin is a yellow scleroprotein, the essential constituent of the elastic connective tissue) resulting in a decrease in the ability of the lamina propria to expand caused by cross-branching of the elastin fibers. Among other things, this leads to the mature voice being better suited to the rigors of opera.

The extracellular matrix of the vocal cord LP is composed of fibrous proteins such as collagen and elastin, and interstitial molecules such as HA, a non-sulfated glycosaminoglycan. While the SLP is rather poor in elastic and collagenous fibers, the ILP and DLP are mostly composed of it, with the concentration of elastic fibers decreasing and the concentration of collagenous fibers increasing as the vocalis muscle is approached. Fibrous proteins and interstitial molecules play different roles within the extracellular matrix. While collagen (mostly type I) provides strength and structural support to the tissue, which are useful to withstanding stress and resisting deformation when subjected to a force, elastin fibers bring elasticity to the tissue, allowing it to return to its original shape after deformation. Interstitial proteins, such as HA, plays important biological and mechanical roles in the vocal cord tissue. In the vocal cord tissue, hyaluronic acid plays a role of shear-thinner, affecting the tissue viscosity, space-filler, shock absorber, as well as wound healing and cell migration promoter. The distribution of those proteins and interstitial molecules has been proven to be affected by both age and gender, and is maintained by the fibroblasts.

==== Maturation ====
Vocal fold structure in adults is quite different from that in newborns. Exactly how the vocal cord matures from an immature monolayer in newborns to a mature three layer tissue in adults is still unknown, however a few studies have investigated the subjects and brought some answers.

Hirano et al. previously found that the newborns did not have a true lamina propria, but instead had cellular regions called maculae flavae, located at the anterior and posterior ends of the loose vocal fold tissue. Boseley and Hartnick examined the development and maturation of pediatric human vocal fold lamina propria. Hartnick was the first one to define each layer by a change in their cellular concentration. He also found that the lamina propria monolayer at birth and shortly thereafter was hypercellular, thus confirming Hirano's observations. By 2 months of age, the vocal fold started differentiating into a bilaminar structure of distinct cellular concentration, with the superficial layer being less densely populated than the deeper layer. By 11 months, a three-layered structure starts to be noted in some specimens, again with different cellular population densities. The superficial layer is still hypocellular, followed by an intermediate more hypercellular layer, and a deeper hypercellular layer, just above the vocalis muscle. Even though the vocal cords seem to start organizing, this is not representative of the trilaminar structure seen in adult tissues, where the layers are defined by their differential elastin and collagen fiber compositions. By seven years of age, all specimens show a three-layered vocal fold structure, based on cellular population densities. At this point, the superficial layer was still hypocellular, the middle layer was the hypercellular one, with also a greater content of elastin and collagen fibers, and the deeper layer was less cellularly populated. Again, the distinction seen between the layers at this stage is not comparable to that seen in the adult tissue. The maturation of the vocal cords did not appear before 13 years of age, where the layers could be defined by their differential fiber composition rather than by their differential cellular population. The pattern now shows a hypocellular superficial layer, followed by a middle layer composed predominantly of elastin fiber, and a deeper layer composed predominantly of collagen fibers. This pattern can be seen in older specimens up to 17 years of age, and above. While this study offers a nice way to see the evolution from immature to mature vocal cords, it still does not explain what is the mechanism behind it.

==== Maculae flavae ====
Maculae flavae are located at the anterior and posterior ends of the membranous parts of the vocal cords. The histological structure of the macula flava is unique, and Sato and Hirano speculated that it could play an important role in growth, development and aging of the vocal cords. The macula flava is composed of fibroblasts, ground substances, elastic and collagenous fibers. Fibroblasts were numerous and spindle or stellate-shaped. The fibroblasts have been observed to be in active phase, with some newly released amorphous materials present at their surface. From a biomechanical point of view, the role of the macula flava is very important. Hirano and Sato studies suggested that the macula flava is responsible for the synthesis of the fibrous components of the vocal cords. Fibroblasts have been found mostly aligned in the direction of the vocal ligament, along bundles of fibers. It then was suggested that the mechanical stresses during phonation were stimulating the fibroblasts to synthesize those fibers.

==== Impact of phonation ====
The viscoelastic properties of human vocal fold lamina propria are essential for their vibration, and depend on the composition and structure of their extracellular matrix. Adult vocal cords have a layered structure which is based on the layers differential in extracellular matrix distribution. Newborns on the other hand, do not have this layered structure. Their vocal cords are uniform, and immature, making their viscoelastic properties most likely unsuitable for phonation. Hyaluronic acid plays a very important role in the vocal fold biomechanics. In fact, hyaluronic acid has been described as the extracellular matrix molecule that not only contributes to the maintenance of an optimal tissue viscosity that allows phonation, but also of an optimal tissue stiffness that allows frequency control. CD44 is a cell surface receptor for HA. Cells such as fibroblasts are responsible for synthesizing extracellular matrix molecules. Cell surface matrix receptors in return, feed back to the cells through cell-matrix interaction, allowing the cell to regulate its metabolism.

Sato et al. carried out a histopathologic investigation of unphonated human vocal cords. Vocal fold mucosae, which were unphonated since birth, of three young adults (17, 24, and 28 years old) were looked at using light and electron microscopy. The results show that the vocal fold mucosae were hypoplastic, and rudimentary, and like newborns, did not have any vocal ligament, Reinke's space, or layered structure. Like newborns, the lamina propria appeared as a uniform structure. Some stellate cells were present in the macula flava, but started to show some signs of degeneration. The stellate cells synthesized fewer extracellular matrix molecules, and the cytoplasmic processes were shown to be short and shrinking, suggesting a decreased activity. Those results confirm the hypothesis that phonation stimulates stellate cells into producing more extracellular matrix.

Furthermore, using a specially designed bioreactor, Titze et al. showed that fibroblasts exposed to mechanical stimulation have differing levels of extracellular matrix production from fibroblasts that are not exposed to mechanical stimulation. The gene expression levels of extracellular matrix constituents such as fibronectin, MMP1, decorin, fibromodulin, hyaluronic acid synthase 2, and CD44 were altered. All those genes are involved in extracellular matrix remodeling, thus suggesting that mechanical forces applied to the tissue, alter the expression levels of extracellular matrix related genes, which in turn allow the cells present in the tissue to regulate the extracellular matrix constituent synthesis, thus affecting the tissue's composition, structure, and biomechanical properties. In the end, cell-surface receptors close the loop by giving feedback on the surrounding extracellular matrix to the cells, affecting also their gene expression level.

==== Impact of hormones ====
Other studies suggest that hormones play also an important role in vocal fold maturation. Hormones are molecules secreted into the blood stream to be delivered at different targeted sites. They usually promote growth, differentiation and functionality in different organs or tissues. Their effect is due to their ability to bind to intracellular receptors, modulating the gene expression, and subsequently regulating protein synthesis. The interaction between the endocrine system and tissues such as breast, brain, testicles, heart, bones, etc., is being extensively studied. It has clearly been seen that the larynx is somewhat affected by hormonal changes, but, very few studies are working on elucidating this relationship. The effect of hormonal changes in voice is clearly seen when hearing male and female voices, or when listening to a teenage voice changing during puberty. Actually, it is believed that the number of hormonal receptors in the pre-pubertal phase is higher than in any other age. Menstruation has also been seen to influence the voice. In fact, singers are encouraged by their instructors not to perform during their pre-menstrual period, because of a drop in their voice quality.

Vocal fold phonatory functions are known to change from birth to old age. The most significant changes occur in development between birth and puberty, and in old age. Hirano et al. previously described several structural changes associated with aging, in the vocal fold tissue. Some of those changes are: a shortening of the membranous vocal fold in males, a thickening of the vocal fold mucosa and cover in females, and a development of edema in the superficial lamina propria layer in both sexes. Hammond et al. observed that the hyaluronic acid content in the vocal fold lamina propria was significantly higher in males than in females. Although all those studies did show that there are clear structural and functional changes seen in the human vocal cords which are associated with gender and age, none really fully elucidated the underlying cause of those changes. In fact, only a few recent studies started to look at the presence and role of hormone receptors in the vocal cords. Newman et al. found that hormone receptors are indeed present in the vocal cords, and show a statistical distribution difference with respect to age and gender. They have identified the presence of androgen, estrogen, and progesterone receptors in epithelial cells, granular cells and fibroblasts of the vocal cords, suggesting that some of the structural changes seen in the vocal cords could be due to hormonal influences. In this specific study, androgen and progesterone receptors were found more commonly in males than in females. In others studies, it has been suggested that the estrogen/androgen ratio be partly responsible for the voice changes observed at menopause. As previously said, Hammond et al. showed than the hyaluronic acid content was higher in male than in female vocal cords. Bentley et al. demonstrated that sex skin swelling seen in monkey was due to an increase in hyaluronic acid content, which was in fact mediated by estrogen receptors in dermal fibroblasts. An increase in collagen biosynthesis mediated by the estrogen receptors of dermal fibroblasts was also observed. A connection between hormone levels, and extracellular matrix distribution in the vocal cords depending on age and gender could be made. More particularly a connection between higher hormone levels and higher hyaluronic acid content in males could exist in the human vocal fold tissue. Although a relationship between hormone levels and extracellular matrix biosynthesis in vocal fold can be established, the details of this relationship, and the mechanisms of the influence has not been elucidated yet.

=== Old age ===
There is a thinning in the superficial layer of the lamina propria in old age. In aging, the vocal fold undergoes considerable sex-specific changes. In the female larynx, the vocal fold cover thickens with aging. The superficial layer of the lamina propria loses density as it becomes more edematous. The intermediate layer of the lamina propria tends to atrophy only in men. The deep layer of the lamina propria of the male vocal fold thickens because of increased collagen deposits. The vocalis muscle atrophies in both men and women. However, the majority of elderly patients with voice disorders have disease processes associated with aging rather than physiologic aging alone.

== Function ==
=== Oscillation ===
The vocal folds in motion

The larynx is a major (but not the only) source of sound in speech, generating sound through the rhythmic opening and closing of the vocal folds. To oscillate, the vocal folds are brought near enough together such that air pressure builds up beneath the larynx. The folds are pushed apart by this increased subglottal pressure, with the inferior part of each fold leading the superior part. Such a wave-like motion causes a transfer of energy from the airflow to the fold tissues. Under the correct conditions, the energy transferred to the tissues is large enough to overcome losses by dissipation and the oscillation pattern will sustain itself. In essence, sound is generated in the larynx by chopping up a steady flow of air into little puffs of sound waves.

The perceived pitch of a person's voice is determined by a number of different factors, most importantly the fundamental frequency of the sound generated by the larynx. The fundamental frequency is influenced by the length, size, and tension of the vocal folds. This frequency averages about 125 Hz in an adult male, 210 Hz in adult females, and over 300 Hz in children. Depth kymography is an imaging method to visualize the complex horizontal and vertical movements of vocal folds.

The vocal folds generate a sound rich in harmonics. The harmonics are produced by collisions of the vocal folds with themselves, by recirculation of some of the air back through the trachea, or both. Some singers can isolate some of those harmonics in a way that is perceived as singing in more than one pitch at the same time—a technique called overtone singing or throat singing such as in the tradition of Tuvan throat singing.

== Clinical significance ==
=== Lesions ===
The majority of vocal fold lesions primarily arise in the cover of the folds. Since the basal lamina secures the epithelium to the superficial layer of the lamina propria with anchoring fibers, this is a common site for injury. If a person has a phonotrauma or habitual vocal hyperfunction, also known as pressed phonation, the proteins in the basal lamina can shear, causing vocal fold injury, usually seen as nodules or polyps, which increase the mass and thickness of the cover. The squamous cell epithelium of the anterior glottis are also a frequent site of laryngeal cancer caused by smoking.

=== Reinke's edema ===
A voice pathology called Reinke's edema, swelling due to abnormal accumulation of fluid, occurs in the superficial lamina propria or Reinke's space. This causes the vocal fold mucosa to appear floppy with excessive movement of the cover that has been described as looking like a loose sock. The greater mass of the vocal folds due to increased fluid lowers the fundamental frequency during phonation.

=== Wound healing ===
Wound healing is a natural regeneration process of dermal and epidermal tissue involving a sequence of biochemical events. These events are complex and can be categorized into three stages: inflammation, proliferation and tissue remodeling. The study on vocal fold wound healing is not as extensive as that on animal models due to the limited availability of human vocal folds. Vocal fold injuries can have a number of causes including chronic overuse, chemical, thermal and mechanical trauma such as smoking, laryngeal cancer, and surgery. Other benign pathological phenomena like polyps, vocal fold nodules and edema will also introduce disordered phonation.

Any injury to human vocal folds elicits a wound healing process characterized by disorganized collagen deposition and, eventually, formation of scar tissue. Verdolini and her group sought to detect and describe acute tissue response of injured rabbit vocal cord model. They quantified the expression of two biochemical markers: interleukin 1 and prostaglandin E2, which are associated with acute wound healing. They found the secretions of these inflammatory mediators were significantly elevated when collected from injured vocal cords versus normal vocal cords. This result was consistent with their previous study about the function of IL-1 and PGE-2 in wound healing. Investigation about the temporal and magnitude of inflammatory response in the vocal cords may benefit for elucidating subsequent pathological events in vocal fold wounding, which is good for clinician to develop therapeutic targets to minimize scar formation. In the proliferative phase of vocal cord wound healing, if the production of hyaluronic acid and collagen is not balanced, which means the hyaluronic acid level is lower than normal, the fibrosis of collagen cannot be regulated. Consequently, regenerative-type wound healing turns to be the formation of scar. Scarring may lead to the deformity of vocal fold edge, the disruption of lipopolysaccharides viscosity and stiffness. Patients suffering from vocal fold scar complain about increased phonatory effort, vocal fatigue, breathlessness, and dysphonia. Vocal fold scar is one of the most challenging problems for otolaryngologists because it is hard to be diagnosed at germinal stage and the function necessity of vocal cords is delicate.

== Terminology ==
The vocal folds are commonly referred to as vocal cords, and less commonly as vocal flaps or vocal bands. The term vocal cords was coined by the French anatomist Antoine Ferrein in 1741. In his violin analogy of the human voice, he postulated that the moving air acted like a bow on cordes vocales. The alternative spelling in English is vocal chords, possibly due to the musical connotations or to confusion with the geometrical definition of the word chord. While both spellings have historical precedents, standard American spelling is cords. According to the Oxford English Corpus, a database of 21st-century texts that contains everything from academic journal articles to unedited writing and blog entries, contemporary writers opt for the nonstandard chords instead of cords 49% of the time. The cords spelling is also standard in the United Kingdom and Australia.

In phonetics, vocal folds is preferred over vocal cords, on the grounds that it is more accurate and illustrative.

== Additional images ==
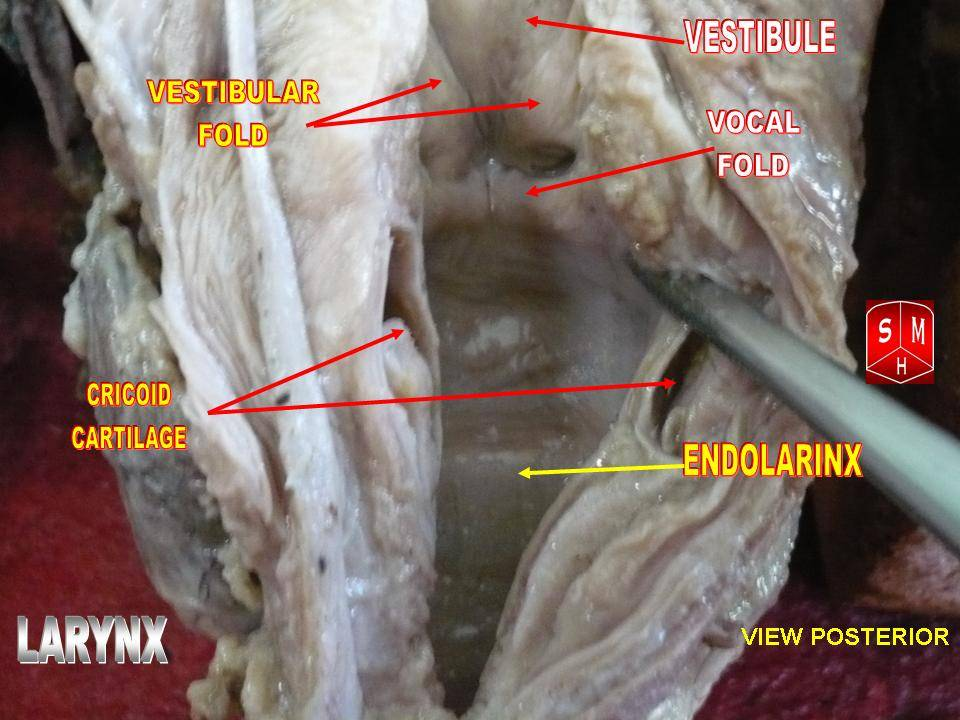
Vocal folds.

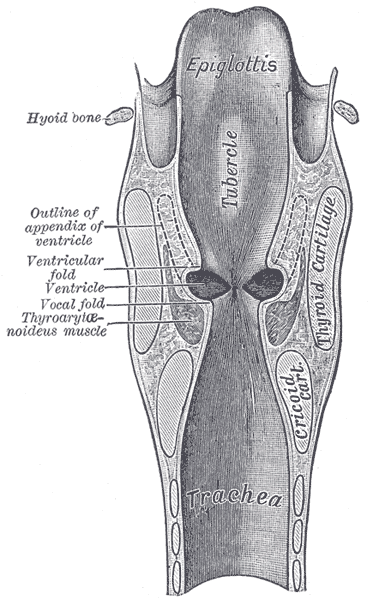
Coronal section of larynx and upper part of trachea.

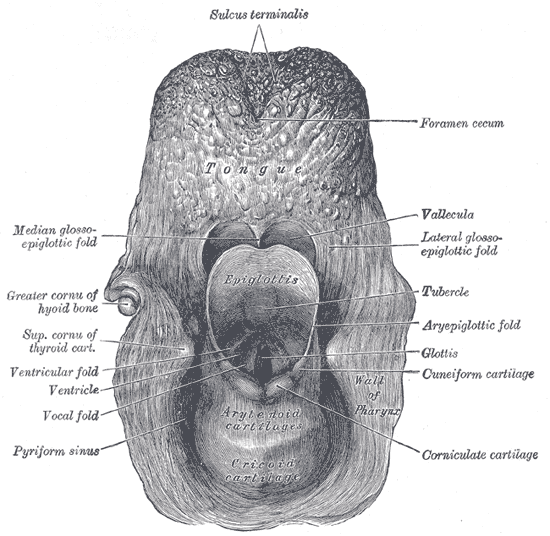
The entrance to the larynx, viewed from behind.

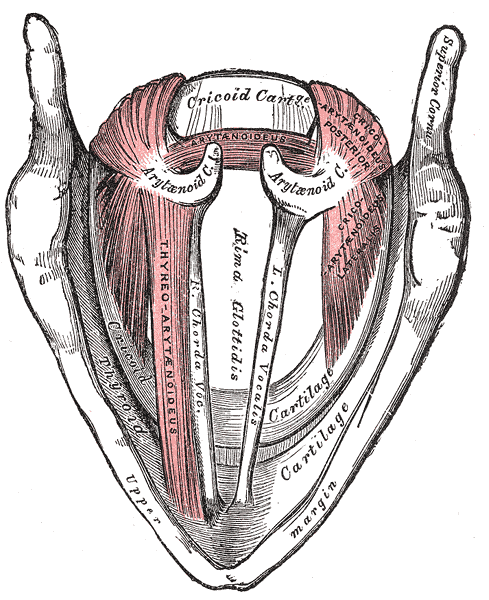
Muscles of the larynx, seen from above.

== See also ==
- Adam's apple
- Electroglottograph
- Vocal register
- Falsetto
- Vocal fry
- Vocal cord dysfunction
- Vocology
- Articulatory phonetics
- Laryngospasm
