= Transgender voice therapy =

Procedure undertaken by transgender people

Transgender voice therapy is any non-surgical vocal therapy technique used to improve or modify the human voice to relieve voice dysphoria by aligning a patient's voice with their gender identity. Because voice is a social cue to a person's sex and gender, transgender people may frequently undertake voice training or therapy as a part of gender transitioning in order to make their voices sound more typical of their gender, and therefore increase their likelihood of being perceived as that gender. Having voice and speech characteristics align with one's gender identity is often important to transgender individuals, whether their goal be feminization, neutralization or masculinization. Voice therapy can be seen as an act of gender- and identity-affirming care, in order to reduce gender dysphoria and gender incongruence, improve the self-reported wellbeing and health of transgender people, and alleviate concerns over an individual being recognized as transgender.

== Voice feminization ==
Voice feminization refers to the perception of voice change from masculine to feminine. It is considered an essential part of care for transfeminine people. Transfeminine people trying to feminize their voice represent the largest group seeking speech therapy services; therefore, most studies regarding transgender voice have focused on voice feminization, as opposed to voice masculinization.

Therapy has been shown to be effective in voice feminization, and the modification of certain voice characteristics, such as fundamental frequency, vocal weight and voice resonance, can help in that effect. Fundamental frequency, closely related to pitch, was initially thought to be the characteristic most effective in voice feminization. Raising the fundamental frequency can help towards voice feminization. However, each person might have different perspectives regarding speech and voice, and therefore the salient characteristics, and their relative impact on femininity, can vary from person to person, and many people are not satisfied with only a change in fundamental frequency.

What is considered a feminine or a masculine voice varies depending on age, region, and cultural norms. The changes with the greatest effects towards feminization, based on current evidence, are fundamental frequency and voice resonance. Other characteristics that have been explored include intonation patterns, voice quality, loudness, speech rate, speech-sound articulation and duration.

== Voice masculinization ==
Voice modifications for transgender men typically involve the lowering of the speaking fundamental frequency. Voice therapy is generally not required for transgender men as the effects of testosterone on the larynx result in a deeper pitch. However, testosterone replacement therapy does not always deepen the voice to the person's desired level, and others choose to not undergo masculinizing hormone therapy at all. Voice masculinization therapy can help to further lower the pitch of transgender men and address voice problems associated with hormone therapy.

In testosterone replacement therapy, the vocal folds masculinize and change faster than the larynx. Overdevelopment of vocal folds in an undescended, small larynx can result in a condition named "entrapped vocality" with permanent hoarseness, and can possibly make it harder for passing. Larynx height can be controlled via controlled exercises, making lowering the larynx a useful tool for transgender men in obtaining a passing voice. Other areas that transgender men may benefit from training are embouchure and maintaining high CQ (closed quotient, a quotient of how long the vocal folds are touching to how long the cycle of vibration lasts), responsible for "heavy" or "buzzy" voice quality.

A speech-language pathologist (SLP) may be involved in aiding transmasculine people to achieve their desired voice goals, while usually prioritizing the overall health of the voice. Therapy techniques may involve finding a person's most comfortable pitch range, using breath support and relaxation exercises, introducing voice strengthening warm-ups, stabilizing posture and increasing chest resonance.

Another option for transgender men who wish to further lower their speaking pitch is to undergo transgender voice surgery.

== Gender perception in voice ==
In the case of AI vocal gender identification examples, key features noted to effect gender perception included fundamental frequency and formant frequency as well as further source related measures including cepstral peak prominence (a rough measure of harmonicity in voice with low values indicating a higher likelihood of dysphonia) and rolloff in energy between the first and second harmonics. A 2020 study in the International Journal of General Medicine noted other factors being involved in gender perception, saying: "a minimum F0 value of 180 Hz required for a voice to be perceived as feminine".

Modifying gender presentation of voice on a selection of vowels including a, i, e and o.

Vocal gender presentation can be assigned by speakers even as things like fundamental frequency stay the same, especially where we see formant frequencies changing, which is noted as important for gender presentation alongside fundamental frequency.

== Transgender voice surgery ==
Surgical procedures may be undertaken by transgender individuals, particularly transgender women, to alter their vocal pitch and quality when voice therapy alone does not achieve desired results. These surgeries modify the vocal folds and laryngeal structures to raise or lower pitch, improve resonance, and contribute to a voice that better aligns with a person's gender identity. Various surgical techniques exist, including cricothyroid approximation, Wendler glottoplasty, feminization laryngoplasty, and laser-assisted procedures. While effective for some, these surgeries carry potential risks and complications and are generally considered after voice therapy.

== Therapeutic techniques ==
Therapy may take place in an individual or group setting. The most common focus in transgender voice therapy is pitch raising or lowering; however, other gender markers may be more important for an individual to work on. Clients and clinicians should discuss goals of therapy to ensure that they are working together toward the voice that most fits the person's gender identity.

In a review of speech literature, Davies and Goldberg (2006) were unable to find any clear protocols for transgender men's voice therapy. Based on the protocols they found for treating transgender women's voices, they proposed the following therapeutic techniques for both voice feminization and masculinization:

- Imitation of cisgender people observed in daily life.
- Progressively complex practice while maintaining good voice quality.
- Vocal flexibility exercises to maintain vocal range and voice quality.
- Motor training.
- Identifying and altering voice qualities when coughing, laughing, and clearing the throat.
- Experimentation with a broad range of voice styles.

While there is some evidence for the effectiveness of voice therapy for transgender people, it is still weak. In a 2012 review by Oates (as referenced in Davies, Papp, and Antoni, 2015) of the literature on transgender voice therapy, 83% of studies were found to be at the lowest level of the evidence hierarchy for evidence-based practice, and the remaining 17% were also at low levels. However, research does show that transgender people who have had voice therapy have high satisfaction with the results, and there is a strong consensus among speech-language pathologists as to what are strong markers of speaker gender in voice.

=== Raising pitch ===
The most common concern for transgender women is their pitch and speaking fundamental frequency (SFF) (the average frequency produced in a connected speech sample) because they typically perceive a feminine voice as using a higher pitch. Although pitch is not the most essential element of voice change for these individuals, it is necessary to raise the SFF to a gender-appropriate pitch to help with vocal feminization. A speech-language pathologist will work with the individual to raise their pitch and provide therapeutic exercises.

The first step in therapy is determining the habitual speaking fundamental frequency of the individual using an acoustic analyzing program. This is accomplished through several tasks including sustained phonation of the vowels [i], [a] and [u], reading a standardized passage and producing a spontaneous speech sample. Then the therapist and the individual determine what the target pitch should be, based on the gender acceptable range for cis women (i.e. a socially acceptable pitch based on the average woman's vocal pitch range). When therapy begins, they establish a starting frequency to work on, that is slightly above the individual's SFF. A starting pitch is chosen that can be produced without strain or excessive vocal effort. As therapy progresses, the target SFF will gradually increase until the goal has been reached. Progression moves from using the target pitch in a sustained vowel to using it in a 2-5 minute conversation.

Semi-occluded vocal tract (SOVT) techniques may be used to facilitate voice production in the higher pitch range. SOVT techniques include phonating into straws, lip or tongue trilling, and producing multiple speech sounds such as nasals (e.g., [m] and [n]), voiced fricatives (e.g., [z] and [v]), and high vowels (e.g., [u] and [i]). There are two exercises that are often used: producing a pitch glide that goes from the middle of the pitch range to the upper pitch range; and a messa di voce exercise, where the voice goes from soft to loud to soft again. SOVT techniques have the individual prolong their voice at a higher pitch, which may help make voice production at a higher, non-habitual pitch easier and more efficient.

Pitch can also be altered through voice resonance modification. The length of the vocal tract affects the resonance of the vocal tract, which in turn affects the pitch. Cis men tend to have vocal tracts that are 10-20% larger than those of cis women, and therefore cis men have a lower vocal tract resonance, and a lower pitch, than cis women. Modifying the length of a vocal tract results in a change in resonance and in pitch, as can be shown by pronouncing a prolonged [s] while protruding and retracting the lips. Transgender women can use techniques, such as retracting the lips, to shorten the vocal tract and sound more feminine.

=== Lowering pitch ===
A lack of training on how to use their new voice may cause some transgender men to have increased muscle tension. Therefore, a speech-language pathologist can give individuals vocal exercises to help find their optimal speaking pitch and maintain overall vocal health. Adler, Hirsch, & Mordaunt (2012), describe the following therapy techniques for transgender men:

- Optimal pitch: Rather than straining to achieve a lower speaking pitch, a comfortable pitch range should be sought. This range is generally approximately between 100 and 105 Hz.
- Diaphragmatic breathing patterns: In order to maintain their new speaking pitch, transgender men need to establish an appropriate breathing pattern to support their speech output. Establishing a stable speaking posture is also important to optimize pitch and breath support.
- Warm-up exercises: A person can do these at home to help to strengthen the voice, maintain optimal pitch and prevent vocal fatigue. Resting the voice after long periods of use is also important.
- Relaxation Techniques: The speech-language pathologist may teach tension-releasing techniques for the jaw, tongue, shoulders, neck and overall laryngeal area.
- Chest resonance: Head resonance is more commonly used by women, and therefore transgender men must establish a pattern of chest resonance to match their lower speaking pitch. Exercises can help establish this chest resonance and help a person lower their larynx.

=== Non-verbal communication ===
Non-verbal communication may have more of an effect on a transgender person's readability than verbal factors such as pitch or resonance. Regardless of what is most effective, congruency between a person's visual and auditory gender presentation contributes greatly to their perceived authenticity. Non-verbal communication includes posture, gesture, movement, and facial expressions. In a discussion of the differences between masculine and feminine non-verbal behaviour, Hirsch and Boonin (2012) describe feminine communication as generally more fluid and continuous. Examples of feminine non-verbal communication behaviours include more smiling, expressive and open facial expression, more side-to-side head movement, and more expressive finger movements than men. Deborah Tannen's book, You Just Don't Understand (1990), is referred to by the authors as a seminal work on the difference in men and women's non-verbal communication.

Within the speech therapy context, non-verbal communication may be targeted through the encouragement of focused observation, offering feedback on the client's self-defined non-verbal goals, offering information about the differences between men and women's non-verbal communication, and/or referring to peer support or expert services.

=== Psychosocial factors ===
While some specific psychosocial issues faced by transgender people are often addressed through psychotherapy, there are psychosocial factors that can influence transgender voice therapy. For example, some clients feel that hormone therapy for transitioning changes concentration and emotional stability, which could affect receptiveness to speech therapy. Davies and Goldberg (2006) also note that an altered voice may feel inauthentic, and it may take time for the client to feel as if their new voice is an expression of their true self.

Transgender erasure describes systematic, individual, or organizational discrimination against transgender people. Informational erasure and institutional erasure were identified in a 2009 Canadian study of health care for transgender people as being the most prominent barriers to care. Informational erasure involves a lack of knowledge, or a perceived lack of knowledge, about transgender health care. This may manifest itself in health care providers being more reluctant to treat transgender clients because of an unwillingness to find information about their specific population. Institutional erasure describes policies that do not accommodate transgender identities or bodies. For example, forms, texts, or prescriptions may refer to a person by an inappropriate name or pronoun. Issues of erasure may hinder a transgender person's ability to find speech therapy services, or may affect the person's comfort with speech therapy.

In addition to paying attention to problems of erasure, Adler and Christianson (2012) suggest that a clinician should be sensitive to the following areas when working with a transgender client:

- Gender attribution and discrimination
- Possible feelings of shame and guilt
- Consequences of the coming out process
- Spouse, partner, or family attitudes
- Employment issues
- Incidence of HIV/AIDS
- Racial and cultural differences

The authors note that this is not an exhaustive list of possible psychosocial factors and that every client is different. Psychosocial factors such as these may affect a transgender client's progress and prognosis in speech therapy.

=== Transition in childhood and adolescence ===
Few studies have considered the potential repercussions of age on therapy. Currently, there is no consensus regarding speech therapy for adolescents. During adolescence, there is an increase of both vocal tract size and vocal fold length, especially for those assigned male at birth, which affects the voice and pitch. Because of these physical changes and hormonal changes, it is difficult to focus on pitch. Previous studies have shown that therapy shaped from adult therapy can be effective.

=== Transition in aging populations ===
Few studies have looked into the transition in the elderly. A survey has shown that many elderly members of the LGBT community do not disclose their LGBT status to their clinicians, including members that receive speech therapy; they choose not to disclose this information because they are afraid it would negatively affect their access to services.

== Disagreement over genderfluid voice ==
The clinical viability of training a bimodal or genderfluid voice is a subject of disagreement. A person may want to have both a masculine and a feminine voice in their vocal repertoire, possibly to fit with their own genderfluid identity, or to read as a different gender in different contexts. Most current transgender speech and voice protocols do not support bimodal speech as a treatment goal. This is based on the clinical concern that such inconsistent use reduces the opportunities for practice, and that switching voice patterns may be too difficult for some clients. However, Davies, Papp and Antoni (2015) reference the ability of actors to use different accents and dialects, and of people to learn different languages as a sign that training a genderfluid voice may be a viable treatment goal.

== See also ==
- Chest voice
- Falsetto
- Speech pathology
- Vocal fry
- Transgender health care
- Language and gender
- List of transgender-related topics
