= Alter (name) =

Alter is both a surname and a given name. German and Jewish (Ashkenazic): distinguishing epithet for the older of two bearers of the same personal name. For the Ashkenazim: from the Yiddish personal name Alter, an inflected form of alt (‘old’). This was in part an omen name, expressing the parents’ hope that the child would live a long life; in part an apotropaic name, given to a child born after the death of a sibling, but also said to have sometimes been assumed by someone who was seriously ill. The purpose is supposed to have been to confuse the Angel of Death into thinking that the person was old and thus not worth claiming as a victim.

Notable people with the name include:

== Surname ==
- Avraham Mordechai Alter (1866–1948), Hasidic rabbi
- David Alter (1807–1881), American inventor
- Dinsmore Alter (1888–1968), American astronomer and meteorologist
- Gary Alter, American plastic surgeon
- Harvey Alter (born 1935), American virologist
- Hobart Alter (1933–2014), American businessman
- Israel Alter (also: Yisraʾel Alter, 1901–1979), Jewish composer and last chief cantor in Hanover, Germany
- Jonathan Alter (born 1957), American journalist
- Karl Joseph Alter (1885–1977), American prelate of the Roman Catholic Church
- Louis Alter (1902–1980), American composer
- Michael Alter (born 1961), American businessman
- Moshe Jacob Alter (1862–1923), Yiddish poet
- Pinchas Menachem Alter (1926–1996), Hassidic rabbi
- Robert Alter (born 1935), Biblical scholar
- Stephen Alter (born 1956), American author
- Simchah Bunim Alter (1898–1992), Hassidic rabbi
- Tom Alter (1950–2017), Indian actor
- Yaakov Aryeh Alter (born 1939), Hassidic rabbi
- Yehudah Aryeh Leib Alter (1847–1905), Hassidic rabbi
- Yisrael Alter (1895–1977), Hassidic rabbi
- Yitzchak Meir Alter (c. 1798 – 1866), Hassidic rabbi

== Given name ==
- Alter Kacyzne (1885–1941), Yiddish writer
- Alter Levin (1883–1933), Hebrew writer and poet
- Alter Tepliker (died 1919), Breslover Hasid and author
- Alter Tsypkin (1891–1985), Soviet legal scholar

== See also ==
- Alter Rebbe, nickname of Shneur Zalman of Liadi
- The Alter of Slabodka (Nosson Tzvi Finkel)
- The Alter of Kelm
- The Alter of Novardok
