= Facial masculinization surgery =

Gender-affirming surgery to alter the face towards a masculine morphology

Facial masculinization surgery (FMS) is an umbrella term for surgical procedures that modify feminine facial features to achieve a masculine appearance using reconstructive surgery techniques. It is mainly performed on trans men.

Masculinizing hormone therapy (using testosterone) leads to sufficient growth of the facial skull in most cases, thereby enabling social integration into the gender role. For this reason, FMS is rarely medically indicated and has received little research attention.

FMS can include various bony procedures such as chin augmentation, cheek augmentation, as well as augmentation of the forehead, jaw, and Adam's apple. In FMS, most procedures involve "having structures added to give more angles to the face."

== History ==
Trans men have requested FMS procedures since the 20th century. FMS is currently less common than FFS. Urologist Miriam Hadj-Moussa notes that "transgender men rarely undergo facial masculinization surgery since testosterone therapy leads to growth of facial hair and makes it easier for them to present."

In 2011, Douglas Ousterhout outlined the available FMS procedures, drawing on the work of Paul Tessier. In 2015 Shane Morrison published an overview of all gender affirming surgeries for trans men, including FMS. In 2017, Ousterhout's successor Jordan Deschamps-Braly published a case report on the first female-to-male facial confirmation surgery that included masculinization of the Adam's apple.

According to the World Professional Association for Transgender Health (WPATH), for many transgender men, FMS is considered medically necessary to treat gender dysphoria. Following the WPATH recommendations, several literature reviews and summaries of the state of the art were published in 2017 and 2018.

== Surgical procedures ==
The surgical procedures most frequently performed during FMS often include facial implants and include the following, as outlined in the literature.

=== Forehead augmentation ===
The purpose of forehead augmentation is to create a less rounded forehead with a more prominent supraorbital ridge typical of cisgender men. It can be done with a customized implant, a calvarial bone graft, fat grafting, or materials such as bone cement that are molded into shape before they harden. Injectable fillers may also be used as an outpatient procedure.

=== Jaw augmentation ===
Orthognathic surgery was first performed for functional reasons in the late 19th century, with cosmetic procedures being improved and refined throughout the 20th century. In facial masculinization surgery, the goal is to create a more robust and square jaw with a sharper mandibular angle. This can be achieved through hydroxyapatite (bone mineral) grafts, which promote new bone growth, or through customized implants.

==== Chin augmentation ====
To change the appearance of the jaw, chin augmentation may also be performed. This can consist of chin implants or an osteotomy to make the chin tip appear wider and more prominent.

=== Adam's apple augmentation ===
This newer procedure uses an implant made from cartilage taken from the patient's rib cage to augment the tip of the thyroid cartilage known as the "Adam's apple." It was first performed in 2017.

== See also ==
- Facial feminization surgery – Gender-affirming surgery to alter the face towards a female morphology
- Gender-affirming surgery – Surgical procedures to affirm gender identity
- Gender-affirming hormone therapy – Gender-affirming medical treatment
- Gender dysphoria – Mental distress due to gender incongruence
