= Jordan Deschamps-Braly =

American maxillofacial and craniofacial surgeon

Jordan Christopher Deschamps-Braly (born 1979) is an American maxillofacial and craniofacial surgeon specializing in facial gender-affirming surgery for transgender people. He co-developed a procedure for building a new Adam's apple for trans men and is known for his work as a plastic surgeon for trans women.

== Early life and education ==
Deschamps-Braly grew up in Ada, Oklahoma. He graduated summa cum laude from the University of Oklahoma Honors College with an advanced degree in biochemistry in 2001, then from the University of Oklahoma College of Medicine in 2005.

== Career ==
Surgeon Douglas Ousterhout picked Deschamps-Braly as successor to his surgical practice focused on transgender clients. Deschamps-Braly calls these procedures facial gender confirmation surgery, which includes facial feminization surgery and facial masculinization surgery. In 2017, Deschamps-Braly published a case report on the first facial gender-affirming surgery for trans men that included his new procedure for masculinization of the Adam's apple. In 2019, he moved into a new office designed by Delugan Meissl Associated Architects.

== Personal life ==
In 2011, during his craniofacial surgery fellowship in Paris, Deschamps-Braly met Sorbonne student Maya Alex. They married in San Francisco in 2013.
