= Transgender rights in Canada =

Rights of transgender individuals in Canada

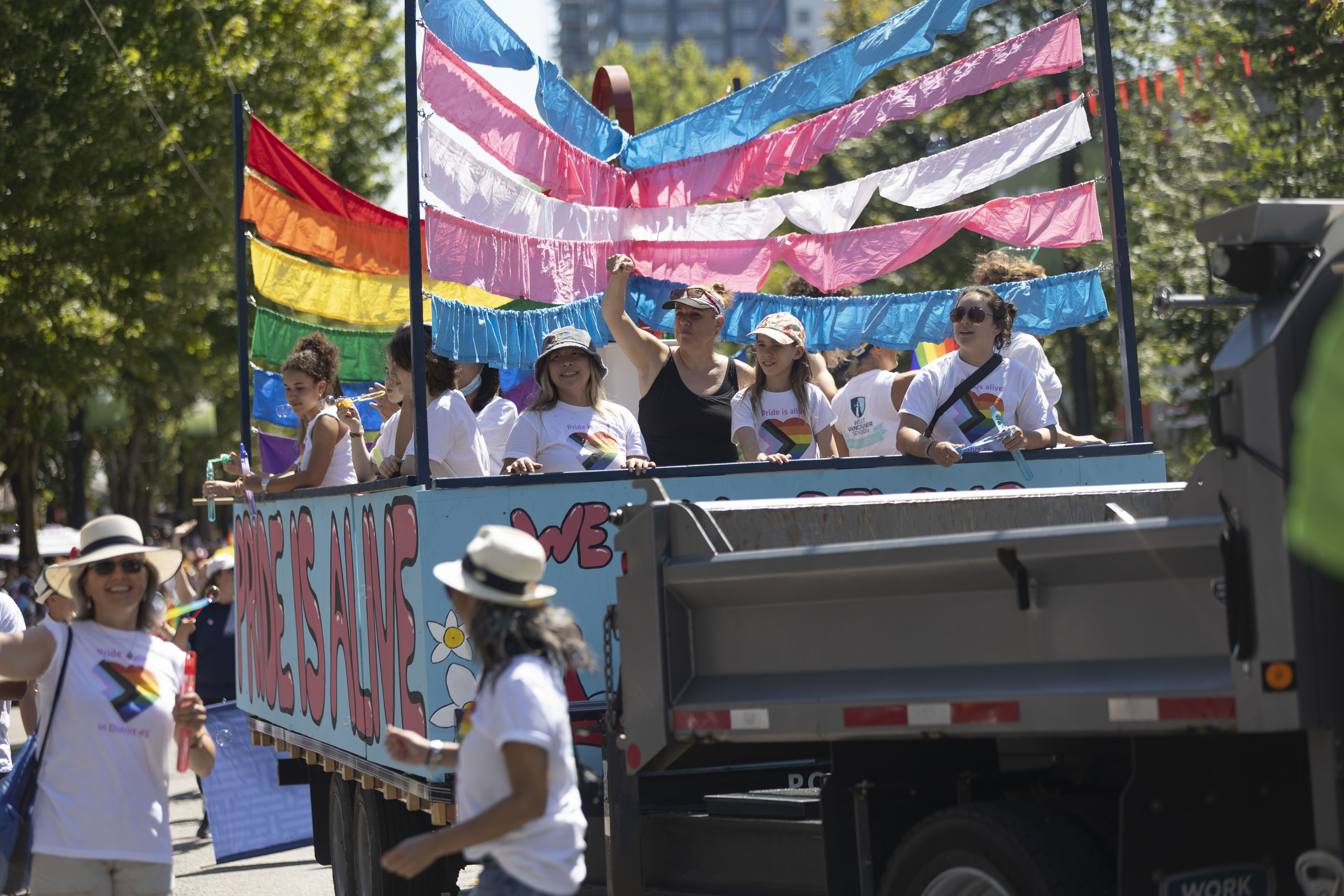
Transgender flag at the Vancouver Pride Parade in 2022

Transgender rights in Canada, including procedures for changing legal gender and protections from discrimination, vary among provinces and territories, due to Canada's nature as a federal state. According to the 2021 Canadian census, 59,460 Canadians identify as transgender. Canada was ranked third in Asher & Lyric's Global Trans Rights Index in 2023.

== Government identity documents ==
There are two main routes to changing one's legal gender in Canada: the Immigration (or 'federal') route, and the Vital Statistics (or 'provincial/territorial' route). Of note is the distinction between 'legal gender' and 'gender marker'; a legal gender (also commonly referred to as a sex designation; sex indicator in Nova Scotia) is what appears on foundational identity documents such as immigration status documents and birth certificates, whilst a gender marker can appear on a non-foundational identity document, such as a driver's licence or photo card. A gender marker usually follows legal gender, but can differ - and a change in gender marker on a non-foundational identity document alone does not provide a trans individual with foundational identity documentation that establishes such a change.

Three provinces (British Columbia, Ontario, and Saskatchewan) and all three territories (Northwest Territories, Nunavut, and Yukon) do not offer anyone not born within the respective province/territory the ability to change their legal gender. However, this is currently pending an amendment in the NWT Vital Statistics Act.

=== Federal ===
Canadian Permanent Residents, Citizens (born inside or outside Canada), Protected Persons, Refugee Claimants and Temporary Residents may apply to Immigration, Refugees and Citizenship Canada using form CIT 0404: Request for a Change of Sex or Gender Identifier. Amendment of documents issued by the person's country of birth, former habitual residence, or nationality is not required. Once the person's gender is changed with IRCC, the agency will issue a Verification of Status annotated with the person's change of name (if any) and gender, as a linking document between their Canadian identity and their foreign birth certificate. Since June 2019, the Canadian passport, citizenship certificate, permanent resident documentation and protected person documentation have offered an "X" option for legal gender.

In July 2020, Global News reported that the policy of not allowing refugee claimants and temporary residents to change their legal gender was causing harm, especially to asylum seekers. The article cites the case of Naomi Chen (a pseudonym), a trans woman who was born in Hong Kong and holds Chinese nationality and Hong Kong permanent resident status. Chen's HKSAR passport still states her gender as 'male', and consequently she was issued a Refugee Protection Claimant Document by IRCC bearing that gender.

Chen was not able to change her legal gender in Hong Kong, fearing that her marriage, which was solemnized in Hong Kong, would be terminated (Hong Kong does not allow same-sex marriage). She says she is now afraid of interacting with the community, given the incorrect gender designation on her documents. In response, Kevin Lemkay, spokesperson for federal immigration minister Marco Mendicino, said that 'reviewing gender identity requirements for government-issued documents [was] a priority'. Will Tao, a Vancouver immigration lawyer, noted that the restriction was a matter of policy and not law. He contended that the Canadian federal government was potentially committing a violation of Section 15 of the Canadian Charter of Rights and Freedoms, in Tao's own words an issue "ripe for future litigation".

As of November 2020, refugee claimants are now able to amend the sex indicator printed on their Refugee Protection Claimant Document. As of March 2021, the same is also now available to temporary residents without the amendment of gender on their country of nationality's passport. Applicants may also elect to amend their legal gender through a provincial process instead, if this is available to them in their province or territory of residence.

=== Alberta ===
Following a 2014 court ruling that struck down the existing legislation and its surgery requirements as unconstitutional, the government of Alberta modified the Vital Statistics Information Regulation in 2015. The current regulations eliminate the surgical requirement. Instead, the applicant must submit a "statement confirming that the person identifies with and is maintaining the gender identity that corresponds with the requested amendment to the sex on the record of birth," as well as a letter from a physician or psychologist attesting that the amendment is appropriate. Legal change of gender is accessible to minors; this requires the parents' or guardians' consent, although this can be waived by court order or if the minor is emancipated, married, or a parent.

A legal change of gender through the province is not currently accessible to residents who were not born in Alberta.

=== British Columbia ===
In British Columbia, the requirement for surgery to change the birth certificate gender marker was removed in 2014. A legal change of gender is not accessible to residents who were not born in British Columbia. Non-binary B.C. resident Kori Doty, along with seven other trans and intersex persons, filed a human rights complaint against the province, alleging that publishing a sex indicator on birth certificates was discriminatory. The British Columbia Human Rights Tribunal agreed in 2015 to hear their complaint. In April 2017, Doty's child, Searyl Atli Doty, became the first in the world to be issued a health card with a "U" gender marker (for 'unspecified'), but the province has refused to issue a birth certificate without specifying a gender. Doty has filed a legal challenge. In 2022, British Columbia allowed people to change their gender designation on the province's main government-issued ID (BC Services Card, B.C. driver’s licence, BCID card and B.C. birth certificate) without the confirmation of a medical professional.

=== Manitoba ===
A change of legal gender in Manitoba is available to persons born there. As of February 1, 2015, there exists no requirement for trans individuals to have undergone gender confirmation surgery. Section 25(3) of the Vital Statistics Act of Manitoba further provides that "a person may apply to the director for a change of sex designation certificate if the person is a Canadian citizen who has been a resident of Manitoba for at least one year before the date the application is submitted." This follows the model formerly adopted by Québec (now invalidated by the Superior Court in that province), but is discrepant with Manitoba's own policy for legal changes of name (three months' ordinary residence). As of July 2020, this provision has been implemented by the Manitoba Vital Statistics Agency.

As of October 13, 2020, the gender marker on Manitoba driver licenses and photo cards can either be unspecified or marked with an 'X'. This is in response to a complaint lodged at the Manitoba Human Rights Commission by non-binary individuals.

A legal change of gender through the province is not current accessible to residents who were not in Manitoba nor a Canadian citizen.

=== New Brunswick ===
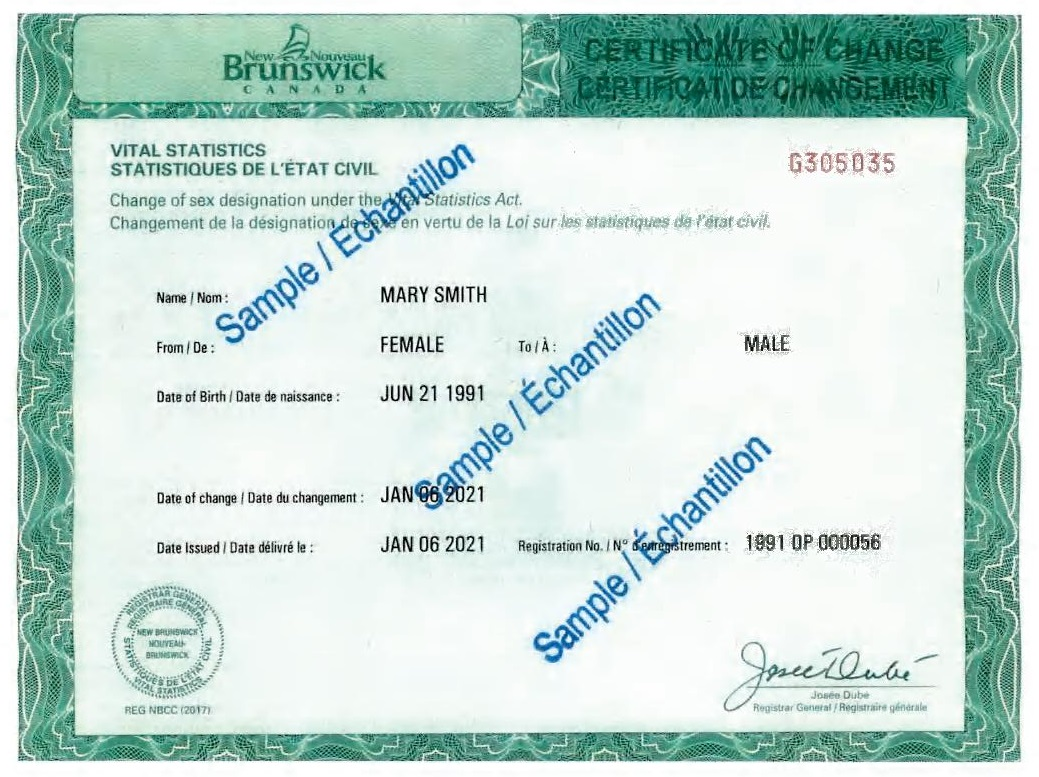
A certificate of change of sex designation issued by New Brunswick.

In April 2017, a bill passed the Legislative Assembly of New Brunswick to add gender identity or expression to the human rights laws and to allow gender changes without the required surgery. A person born in New Brunswick or ordinarily resident there for at least three months may make application to Service New Brunswick for a change of their legal gender.

=== Newfoundland and Labrador ===
Persons born in Newfoundland and Labrador have been able to have the sex indicator on their birth registration changed since the adoption of a new Vital Statistics Act in 2009. Initially, that provision was available only to those who had undergone gender confirmation surgery, but such requirement was removed following the December 2015 decision of a Newfoundland and Labrador Human Rights Board of Inquiry on complaints filed with the Human Rights Commission from two trans women. The amendment received Royal Assent on April 13, 2016.

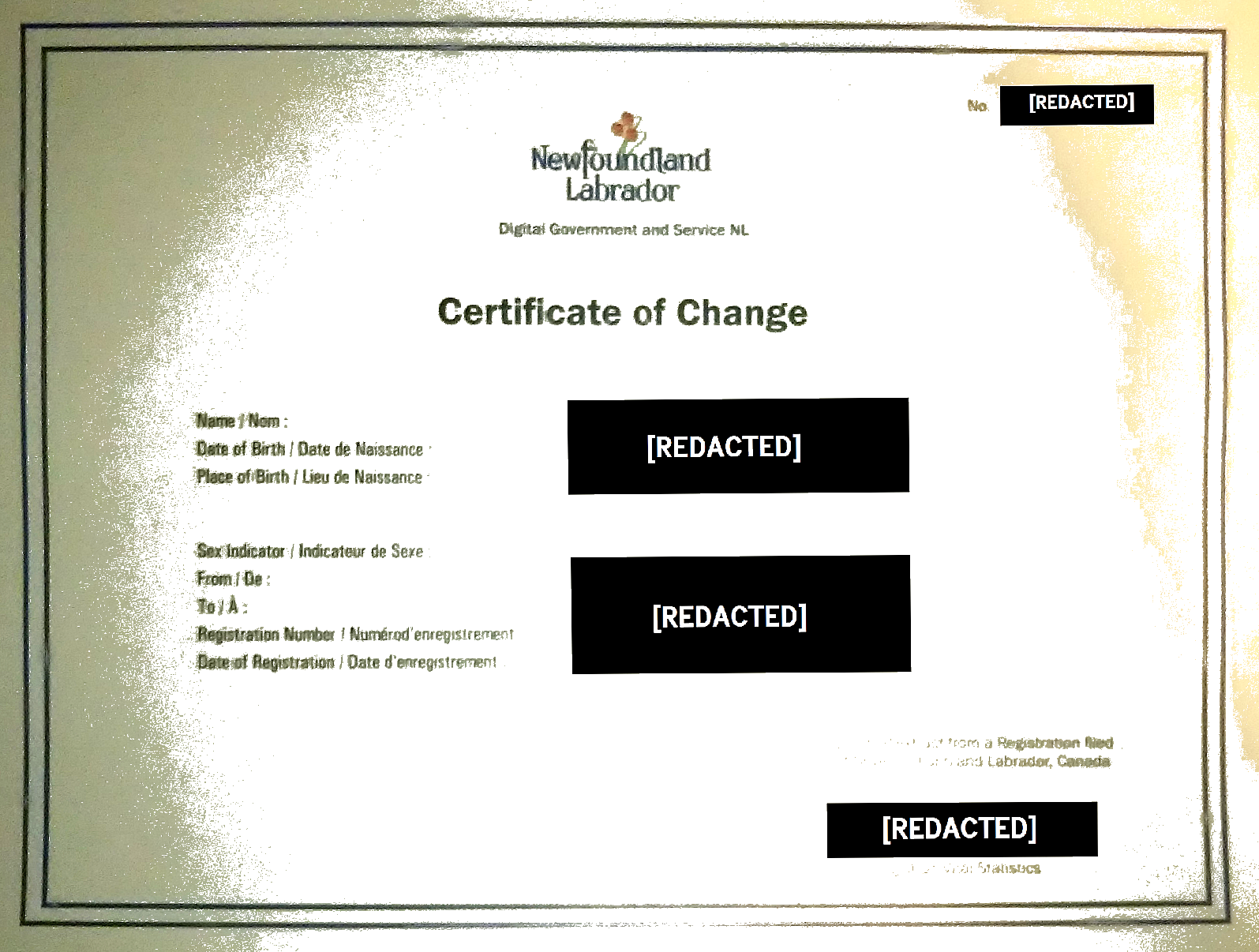
A certificate of change of sex designation issued by Newfoundland and Labrador.

The first gender-neutral birth certificate in Newfoundland and Labrador, and possibly the first in Canada, was issued December 14, 2017, to Gemma Hickey, a non-binary resident of St. John's, the province's capital. Hickey, an award-winning activist, had launched court action seeking to compel the Government of Newfoundland and Labrador to issue the gender-neutral certificate after their application for such a document was rejected because the application form was limited to male or female designation only. Hickey withdrew the court action after the government agreed to amend the Vital Statistics Act to authorize the issuing of gender-neutral birth certificates. That amendment received Royal Assent on December 7, 2017.

On June 1, 2021, a bill to amend the Vital Statistics Act to provide for the issuance of certificates of change of sex designation to people born outside Newfoundland and Labrador who have been living in the province for three months was tabled. On June 17, the bill passed Second Reading and the Committee of the Whole stage, and Third Reading on June 22. On June 23, Royal Assent was given. Therefore, Newfoundland and Labrador now permits a provincial change of legal gender for all residents, regardless of citizenship or immigration status, or birthplace.

=== Northwest Territories ===
The Northwest Territories government removed the surgery requirement for a legal gender change from the Vital Statistics Act in June 2016.

A territorial legal change of gender is not accessible to residents who were not born in NWT. As of May 2023, however, the territorial government has indicated that it would like to provide for the issuance of change of gender certificates to such residents. This was one of the proposed amendments outlined in the GNWT report What We Heard: Vital Statistics Act and Change of Name Act - Proposed Key Elements - Amendments. The intent is to bring a bill of amendments forth, sometime during the 2023-2027 sitting of the Legislative Assembly.

=== Nova Scotia ===
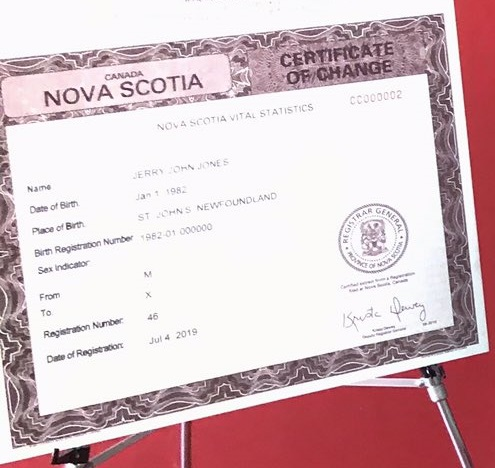
A sample certificate of change of sex identifier issued by Nova Scotia

On May 11, 2015, Bill 82, An Act to Amend Chapter 66 of the Revised Statutes, 1989, the Change of Name Act, and Chapter 494 of the Revised Statutes, 1989, the Vital Statistics Act received Royal Assent. This act abolishes the surgical requirement, instead requiring a statement "that the applicant has assumed, identifies with and intends to maintain the gender identity that corresponds with the change requested," and an attestation from a professional that the applicant's gender identity does not correspond to that listed on the birth certificate. The Act came into force the week of September 24, 2015.

Therefore, a change of sex indicator is now available in Nova Scotia for persons born there or those who have been ordinarily resident at least three months in the province. Nova Scotia also offers the option of no gender being displayed on one's driver's licence and/or identification card.

=== Nunavut ===
Nunavut removed the surgery requirement for a legal gender change from the Vital Statistics Act in March 2015.

A territorial legal change of gender is not accessible to residents who were not born in Nunavut.

=== Ontario ===
Ontario has no surgical requirement for a gender marker change and offers F (female), M (male), and X (non-binary) markers on birth certificates. They only offer sex designation changes for those born in Ontario. A ruling on 11 April 2012 by the Human Rights Tribunal of Ontario removed the requirement for surgery Applicants requesting this birth certificate change are required to submit a letter from a physician or psychologist verifying knowledge of their gender identity and stating that the change is appropriate.

Ontario also offers F, M, and X markers on driver's licences. To change between F and M, an applicant must provide either their birth certificate or a letter from an Ontario-licensed physician or psychologist. The province's health cards do not have a gender designation.

In July 2021, an Ontario resident who was born abroad tried to obtain photo identification from ServiceOntario, only to be rejected as she could not obtain an amended birth certificate from her country of birth, nor an Ontario birth certificate. Despite official policies to the contrary, staff requested evidence that she had undergone surgery.

=== Prince Edward Island ===
In April 2016, the Prince Edward Island government amended the Vital Statistics Act to allow individuals to change their legal gender on ID without surgery. Individuals must present a letter from a doctor attesting to the applicant's gender identity. Islanders can also now choose to display no gender on their PEI-issued driver's licence/voluntary identification card.

A provincial change of legal gender remains inaccessible for PEI residents born off-Island.

=== Quebec ===
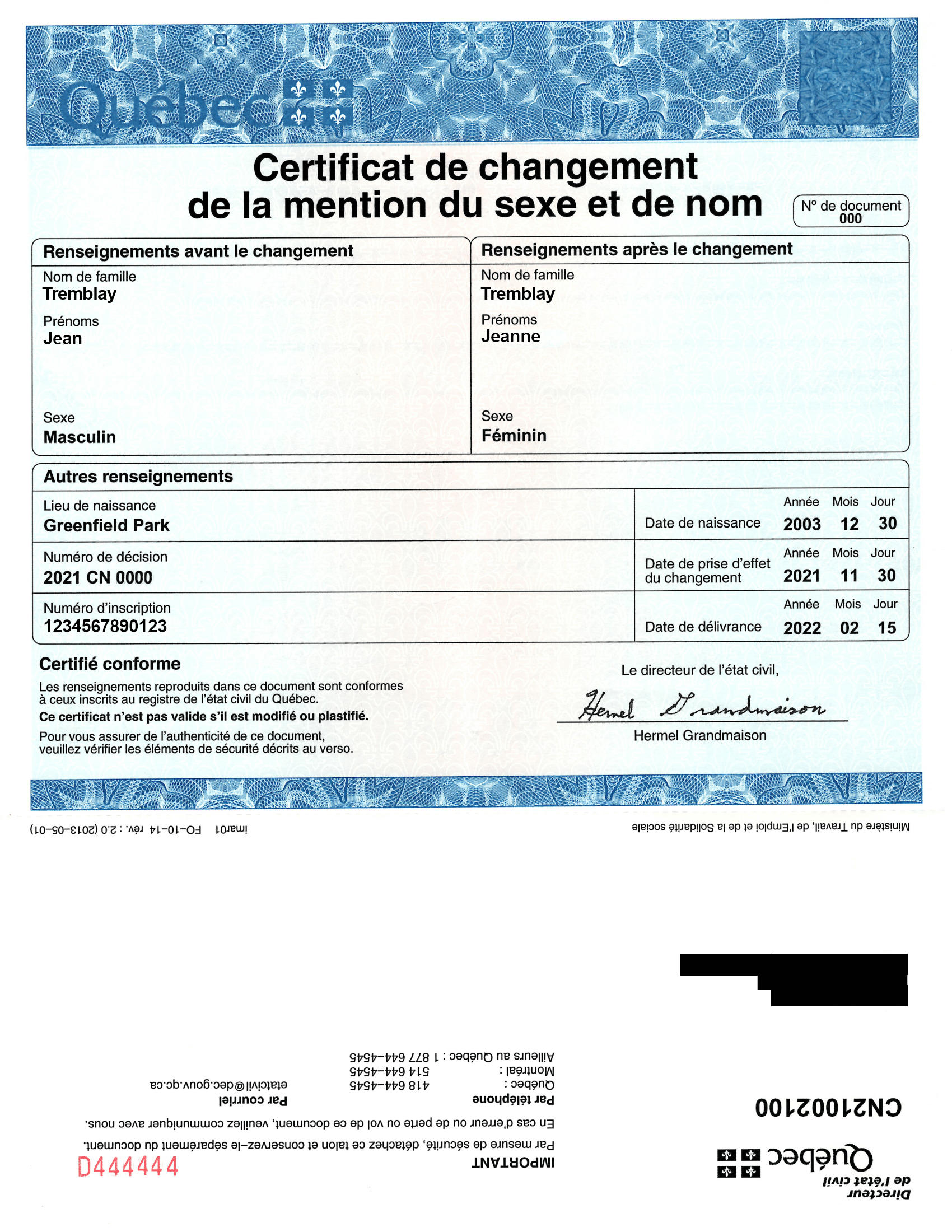
A sample certificate of change of mention of sex issued by Québec

Since October 2015, adults have been able to change their legal gender on birth certificates in Quebec. The process was simplified for minors in June 2016.

To qualify to change legal gender, the person concerned by the application must be domiciled in Quebec for at least one year. If the person concerned by the application was born in Quebec but lives elsewhere, the person may also qualify to change the sex designation if the person shows that such an amendment is not possible in the province or country in which the person is domiciled. They may make application to the Directeur de l'etat civil for a Certificate of Change of Mention of Sex (certificat de changement de la mention du sexe), regardless of their place of birth; however, this is solely limited to a male or female sex designation, forbidding the use of a non-binary gender designator. They may also apply for a combination Certificate of Change of Mention of Sex and Name (certificat de changement de la mention du sexe et de nom). After such a certificate is issued, one's gender may be amended on a Quebec birth certificate. If one was born outside Quebec, the birth certificate will be designated a semi-authentic act pursuant to Article 137 of the Civil Code.

Previously, Quebec required applicants to be Canadian citizens. A 2021 court ruling, Centre for Gender Advocacy et al. v. Attorney General of Quebec, has struck down six legal provisions considered discriminatory towards trans and non-binary Quebecois, including one forbidding the use of non-binary gender designations, and another one prohibiting non-citizens to obtain a change of name and sex designation. The Quebec government has until the end of 2021 to amend these aforementioned legal provisions, except for the discriminatory citizenship requirement, which the Court declared invalid with immediate effect. The citizenship requirement has been removed in practice by the Directeur on application forms.

In October 2021, Quebec Minister of Justice Simon Jolin-Barrette introduced Bill 2, which among other things would partially reverse Quebec's policy on birth certificate changes, creating a second category called "gender identity" on the certificate and allowing trans people to only change that while keeping the "sex" category fixed unless said trans people underwent a sex change. Bill 2 was quickly denounced by various civil society groups, and in November 2021, the Office of the Minister of Justice stated in an e-mail to MTLBlog that "[they were confirming] that the requirement for an operation to change the sex designation [would] be removed from the bill."

=== Saskatchewan ===
In February 2016, the provincial government changed the Saskatchewan Vital Statistics Act to eliminate gender confirmation surgery as a prerequisite for changing government documents. In May 2018, a judge ruled that the gender marker can be removed from a birth certificate.

Saskatchewan permits the change of sex designation on a Saskatchewan driver’s licence or photo identification card to all residents. However, a provincial change of legal gender remains inaccessible for Saskatchewan residents born outside the province.

=== Yukon ===
On April 25, 2017, a bill called Act to Amend the Human Rights Act and the Vital Statistics Act (2017) was introduced to the Second Session of the 34th Legislative Assembly as Bill 5. Its intended purpose was to add "gender identity or expression" to the Human Rights Act, and to allow the recognition of gender without surgery being required under the Vital Statistics Act. On July 1, 2017, it went into effect.

A person may amend the gender designation on their driver’s licence and/or general identification card by presentation of a Change of Gender Designation form.

A territorial change of legal gender remains inaccessible for Yukon residents born outside the territory.

== Discrimination protections ==
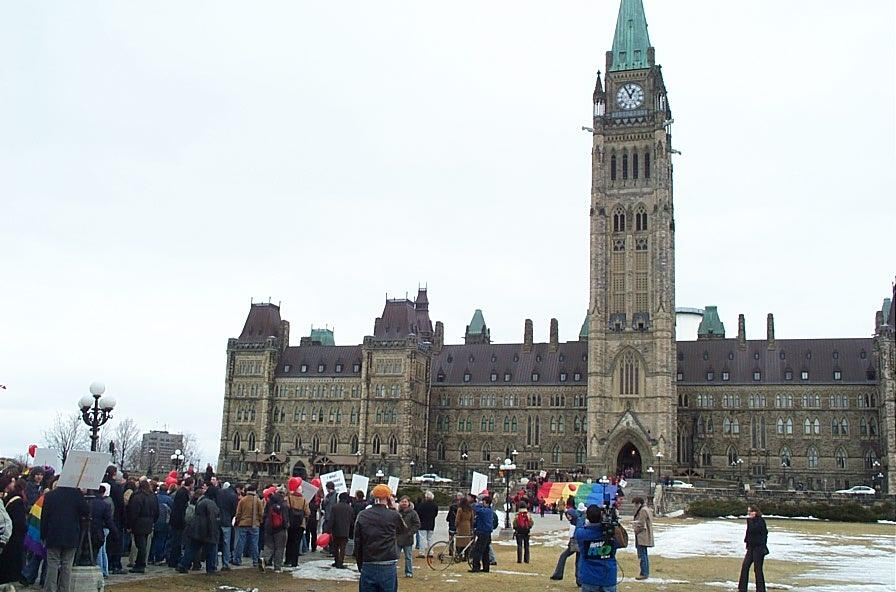
"March of Hearts" rally for same-sex marriage in Canada on Parliament Hill in Ottawa, March 6, 2004

=== Bill C-16 ===
In 2005, NDP MP Bill Siksay introduced a bill in the House of Commons to explicitly add gender identity and expression as prohibited grounds of discrimination in the Canadian Human Rights Act. He reintroduced the bill in 2006. In May 2009, he introduced it again, with additional provisions to add gender identity and expression to the hate crimes provisions of the Criminal Code. In February 2011, it passed third reading in the House of Commons with support from all parties, but was not considered in the Senate before Parliament was dissolved for the 41st Canadian federal election. Two bills—C-276 and C-279—on the subject where introduced in the 41st Canadian Parliament, by the Liberals and the NDP respectively. The NDP's bill C-279 passed second reading on June 6, 2012. However, the bill again died on the Senate order paper when the 2015 federal election was called. In May 2016, the Liberals introduced An Act to amend the Canadian Human Rights Act and the Criminal Code (Bill C-16) in the House of Commons, to add "gender identity and expression" in the Canadian Human Rights Act and Criminal Code. In June 2017, Parliament passed bill C-16 and it received royal assent a week later coming into effect immediately. It updated the Canadian Human Rights Act and the Criminal Code to include "gender identity and gender expression" as protected grounds from discrimination, hate publications and advocating transgender genocide. The bill also added "gender identity and expression" to the list of aggravating factors in sentencing, where the accused commits a criminal offence against an individual because of those personal characteristics. Similar transgender laws also exist in all the provinces and territories.

=== Enforcement mechanism ===
The federal government and every province and territory in Canada has enacted human rights acts that prohibit discrimination and harassment on several grounds (e.g. race, gender identity or expression, age, marital status, sexual orientation, disability, sex, religion) in private and public sector employment, housing, public services and publicity. Some acts also apply to additional activities. These acts are quasi-constitutional laws that override ordinary laws as well as regulations, contracts and collective agreements. They are typically enforced by human rights commissions and tribunals through a complaint investigation, conciliation and arbitration process that is slow, but free, and includes protection against retaliation. A lawyer is not required.

=== Grounds for prohibiting discrimination ===
In 1977, the Québec Charter of Rights and Freedoms, which is both a charter of rights and a human rights act, was amended to prohibit discrimination based on sexual orientation. Thus, the province of Québec became the first jurisdiction in the world larger than a city or county to prohibit sexual orientation discrimination in the private and public sectors. Today, sexual orientation is explicitly mentioned as a ground of prohibited discrimination in the human rights acts of all jurisdictions in Canada. In 2016, gender identity or expression was added to the Québec Charter.

Sexual orientation is not defined in any human rights act, but is widely interpreted as meaning heterosexuality, homosexuality and bisexuality. It does not include transsexuality or transgender people. The Federal Court of Canada has stated that sexual orientation "is a precise legal concept that deals specifically with an individual's preference in terms of gender" in sexual relationships, and is not vague or overly broad. The Ontario Human Rights Commission has adopted the following definition:

Sexual orientation is more than simply a 'status' that an individual possesses; it is an immutable personal characteristic that forms part of an individual's core identity. Sexual orientation encompasses the range of human sexuality from gay and lesbian to bisexual and heterosexual orientations.

All human rights laws in Canada also explicitly prohibit discrimination based on disability, which has been interpreted to include AIDS, ARC and being HIV positive, and membership in a high-risk group for HIV infection.

Since June 2017, all places within Canada explicitly within the Canadian Human Rights Act, equal opportunity and/or anti-discrimination legislation prohibit discrimination against gender identity or gender identity or expression.

In addition, human rights commissions consider that sex discrimination includes discrimination based on gender identity at the federal level and in New Brunswick.

The Ontario Human Rights Commission defines gender identity as follows:

Gender identity is linked to an individual's intrinsic sense of self and, particularly the sense of being male or female. Gender identity may or may not conform to a person's birth assigned sex. The personal characteristics that are associated with gender identity include self-image, physical and biological appearance, expression, behaviour and conduct, as they relate to gender. … Individuals whose birth-assigned sex does not conform to their gender identity include transsexuals [sic], transgenderists [sic], intersexed [sic] persons and cross-dressers. A person's gender identity is fundamentally different from and not determinative of their sexual orientation.

=== LGBTQ discrimination protections table ===
Jurisdiction	Sexual orientation	Gender identity	Gender expression	Conversion therapy ban
Canada (federal)	Yes (since 1996)	Yes (since 2017)	Yes (since 2017)	Yes — Nationwide (Since 7 January 2022)
Alberta	Yes (since 2009)	Yes (since 2015)	Yes (since 2015)	Banned in some municipalities prior to enactment of federal ban: Strathcona County, St. Albert, and Edmonton since 2019; Calgary, Lethbridge, the Regional Municipality of Wood Buffalo, and Spruce Grove since 2020; and Fort Saskatchewan, and Strathmore since 2021.
British Columbia	Yes (since 1992)	Yes (since 2016)	Yes (since 2016)	Banned in Vancouver since 2018, prior to enactment of federal ban.
Manitoba	Yes (since 1987)	Yes (since 2012)	Yes (since 2025)	Banned provincially since 2015, prior to enactment of federal ban.
New Brunswick	Yes (since 1992)	Yes (since 2017)	Yes (since 2017)	No provincial legislation prior to enactment of federal ban
Newfoundland and Labrador	Yes (since 1995)	Yes (since 2013)	Yes (since 2013)	No provincial legislation prior to enactment of federal ban
Nova Scotia	Yes (since 1991)	Yes (since 2012)	Yes (since 2012)	Banned provincially since September 25, 2018, prior to enactment of federal ban.
Ontario	Yes (since 1986)	Yes (since 2012)	Yes (since 2012)	Banned provincially since 2015, prior to enactment of federal ban.
Prince Edward Island	Yes (since 1998)	Yes (since 2013)	Yes (since 2013)	Banned provincially since 2019, prior to enactment of federal ban
Quebec	Yes (since 1977)	Yes (since 2016)	Yes (since 2016)	Banned provincially since 2020, prior to enactment of federal ban
Saskatchewan	Yes (since 1993)	Yes (since 2014)	Not explicitly protected	Banned in two municipalities since 2021, prior to enactment of federal ban: Saskatoon and Regina
Northwest Territories	Yes (since 2002)	Yes (since 2002)	Yes (since 2019)	No territorial legislation prior to enactment of federal ban
Nunavut	Yes (since 1999)	Yes (since 2017)	Yes (since 2017)	No territorial legislation prior to enactment of federal ban
Yukon	Yes (since 1987)	Yes (since 2017)	Yes (since 2017)	Banned territorially since 2020, prior to enactment of federal ban

=== Activities where equality is guaranteed ===
Discrimination, including harassment, based on real or perceived sexual orientation, HIV/AIDS and gender identity is prohibited throughout Canada in private and public sector employment, housing and services provided to the public. All aspects of employment are covered, including benefits for spouses and long-term partners. Examples of services include credit, insurance, government programs and schools open to the public. Schools open to the public are liable for anti-gay name-calling and bullying by students or staff.

Prohibited discrimination occurs not only when someone is treated less favourably or is harassed based on a prohibited ground, but also when a policy or practice has an unintended disproportionately adverse effect based on that ground. This is called "adverse effect discrimination". For example, it might in theory be discriminatory for schools to implement a uniform policy that has specifically gendered uniforms.

=== Trans inclusion in the Canadian Forces ===
LGBT Canadians have been allowed to serve in the military since the Douglas case was settled in 1992. However, in March 2019 The Canadian Armed Forces (CAF) issued revised policies with a mandate of inclusion of gender diverse Canadians. The new directive stresses ones right to freely express their gender identity and outlines uniform and naming protocols, medical and surgical support opportunities and accommodations to privacy.

=== Trans considerations in federal prison ===
In 2018 new operations were implemented to accommodate offenders based on gender identity instead of sex assigned at birth. These policy amendments are a result of The Canadian Human Rights Commission, The Correctional Service of Canada and Prisoners Legal Services combined efforts. They include changes such as using an offenders preferred name and pronouns, placing offenders in a men's or women's institutions based on gender identity regardless of anatomy and ensuring the privacy, dignity and safety of trans or gender-diverse offenders.

Policy numbers and titles that have been amended

CD 352 – Inmate Clothing Entitlements

CD 550 – Inmate Accommodation (and User Guide)

CD 566-7 – Searching of Offenders

CD 566-10 – Urinalysis Testing

CD 566-12 – Personal Property Of Offenders

CD 567-1 – Use of Force

CD 577 – Staff Protocol in Women Offender Institutions

CD 702 – Aboriginal Offenders

CD 705-1 – Preliminary Assessments and Post-Sentence Community Assessments

CD 705-3 – Immediate Needs Identification and Admission Interviews

CD 705-7 – Security Classification and Penitentiary Placement

CD 710-2 – Transfer of Inmates

CD 800 – Health Services

GL 800-5 – Gender Dysphoria

CD 843 – Interventions to Preserve Life and Prevent Serious Bodily Harm

== Coverage for transition-related surgeries ==
Canada's system of universal healthcare is delivered through provincial healthcare systems, which vary in terms of their benefits and features, including in the area of transgender health care. As of 2020, all provinces provided coverage for sex reassignment surgery such as vaginoplasty, orchiectomy, or phalloplasty. New Brunswick was the last province to begin insuring such procedures in 2016. Insurance coverage is not generally provided for the transition-related procedures of facial feminization surgery, tracheal shave, or laser hair removal. Reproductive services are also not covered for trans people, with the costs being quite high. For example Rainbow Health Ontario, an LGBTQ+ healthcare organization, estimates that freezing sperm typically costs $125 to $300, with an additional $200 for each year of storage. They also estimate that preserving embryos costs between $480 to $650, with $150 to $300 in storage fees.

The first transgender healthcare clinic in Canada opened at the Clarke Institute of Psychiatry in Toronto in 1969. In 1970, Canadian transgender woman Dianna Boileau underwent surgery at Toronto General Hospital to have her remaining male genitals removed and female genitals constructed. It was the first time such a surgery had been covered by the Ontario Health Insurance Plan. It was also the first widely publicized sex reassignment surgery in Canada. The first transgender healthcare clinic to offer genital surgery was the Centre Métropolitain de Chirurgie Plastique in Montreal, which opened in 1973. It was also the only Canadian clinic that performed vaginoplasties, the surgical construction of a vagina, on transgender women for 45 years. Transgender surgical clinics opened at Women's College Hospital in Toronto in 2017, and at Vancouver General Hospital in 2019.

=== Ontario ===
The Ontario Health Insurance Plan (OHIP) began covering sex reassignment surgery in 1970. The first person to have such a surgery under OHIP was Dianna Boileau. It was removed from the list of covered procedures in October 1998 under Mike Harris' Progressive Conservative government, apparently as a cost-saving measure, sparking an outcry from the transgender community. Some surgeries began to be covered again in 2008.

Until 2016, only a single clinic, the Gender Identity Clinic at the Centre for Addiction and Mental Health in Toronto, was able to provide referrals for OHIP-reimbursed surgeries. Ontario saw a large rise in patients seeking SRS after 2008, and by 2015, the CAMH gender clinic had a waitlist of 1,150. That year, Ontario health minister Eric Hoskins announced plans to allow referrals from any qualified healthcare provider. The changes went into effect in 2016.

=== Newfoundland and Labrador ===
Similar to Ontario, Newfoundland and Labrador's Medical Care Plan (MCP) formerly required surgical assessments from CAMH as a prerequisite for covering SRS procedures. This was subject to outcry from the province's trans community, including in one case a complaint filed with the Newfoundland Human Rights Commission. It was the last province to require such an assessment.

In 2019, a new policy on Transition-Related Surgeries went into effect, removing the CAMH assessment requirement. However, other barriers still exist for Newfoundlanders and Labradoreans accessing SRS procedures; some procedures are not covered at all, and since all surgeries are performed outside the province, costs relating to travel and accommodations must be paid upfront. MTAP (the Medical Transportation Assistance Program) does provide some subsidies for these non-surgical costs, but only partially.

=== Nova Scotia ===
Transgender and non-binary Nova Scotians can get gender affirming surgeries (GAS) publicly funded through Nova Scotia's Medical Service Insurance. All covered GAS procedures can be performed through GrS Montreal's Centre Métropolitain de Chirurgie in Montreal and a majority can also be performed in Nova Scotia. And as of July 28, 2023 the eligibility criteria is based on Version 8 of the WPATH Standards of Care.

	Covered GRS Producers
Available in Nova Scotia and Montreal	orchiectomy, penectomy, breast augmentation, breast reduction, chest masculinization/mastectomy, hysterectomy, oophorectomy
Available only in Montreal	phalloplasty, metoidioplasty, vaginoplasty

=== Yukon ===
On March 12, 2021, the Yukon government made changes to Transition-Related Surgeries policy that would by April provide a nationally unmatched coverage - e.g. for facial feminization surgery and voice training, which are not usually covered by provincial/territorial medical care plans. The government also stated its intent to align with best practices identified by World Professional Association for Transgender Health (WPATH) guidelines.

== Blood donation ==
On August 15, 2016, Canadian Blood Services established new eligibility criteria for transgender people. These criteria stated that transgender donors who had not had lower gender affirming surgery would be asked questions based on their sex assigned at birth. They would be eligible to donate or be deferred based on these criteria. For example, trans women would be asked if they have had sex with a man in the last 12 months. If the response is yes, they would be deferred for one year after their last sexual contact with a man. Donors who have had lower gender affirming surgery would be deferred from donating blood for one year after their surgery. After that year, these donors will be screened in their affirmed gender. This means that trans women who have not had gender affirming surgery and have sex with men would be deferred for three months following last sexual contact before being eligible, similarly to men who have sex with men. This distinction between operative and non-operative trans women was deemed transphobic by some trans rights activists in different provinces.

On September 11, 2022, new sexual behaviour-based screening was implemented for all donors, regardless of gender or sexual orientation. The new screening procedure requires a deferral for anyone who has had new or multiple sexual partners in the last three months, and has had anal sex in that period.

== Healthcare access ==
According to the Canadian Pediatric Society, "Current evidence shows puberty blockers to be safe when used appropriately, and they remain an option to be considered within a wider view of the patient's mental and psychosocial health."

A study of transgender Ontario residents aged 16 and over, published in 2016, found that half of them were reluctant to discuss transgender issues with their family doctor. A 2013–2014 nationwide study of young transgender and genderqueer Canadians found that a third of younger (ages 14–18) and half of the older (ages 19–25) respondents missed needed physical health care. Only 15 percent of respondents with a family doctor felt very comfortable discussing transgender issues with them.

All Canadian provinces fund some sex reassignment surgeries. Waiting times for surgeries can be lengthy, as few surgeons in the country provide them; a clinic in Montreal is the only one providing a full range of procedures. Insurance coverage is not generally provided for the transition-related procedures of facial feminization surgery, chondrolaryngoplasty, or laser hair removal.

In January 2024, the Alberta government of Danielle Smith announced plans to ban gender affirming surgeries for minors under the age of 18 and hormones and puberty blockers for minors under the age of 16. The bill implementing said ban, Bill 26, would pass in November 2024. In June 2025, a judge temporarily blocked Alberta's ban, saying that withholding gender affirming care from minors will cause "irreparable harm". Smith has vowed to appeal the ruling, and has since invoked the notwithstanding clause to force the implementation of said law. On December 18, 2025, justice Allison Kuntz ruled in favor of the Alberta government, removing the temporary injunction she had previously granted.

== Conversion therapy ==
Since 2022, conversion therapy (including attempting to 'convert' transgender individuals to cisgender) has been illegal in all provinces and territories. The provinces of Ontario, Manitoba, Quebec, Nova Scotia, and Prince Edward Island had bans in place prior to the enactment of federal legislation. In 2018, the City of Vancouver became the only city in British Columbia to outlaw the practice, and in 2019 St. Albert became the first City in Alberta to ban the practice followed by Edmonton also in 2019, and Calgary in 2020. And on 9 March 2020, the Minister of Justice introduced Bill C-8, An Act to amend the Criminal Code (conversion therapy). Due to a prorogue of parliament by Prime Minister Justin Trudeau, the bill died and was later revived in 2020 as Bill C-6, and was passed in the House of Commons with some opposition from Conservative MPs.

=== Ontario ===
In 2015, Ontario premier Kathleen Wynne directed her Health Minister, Eric Hoskins, to petition the College of Physicians and Surgeons of Ontario for a ban on conversion therapy under their standards of practice. As well, Wynne spoke in favour of a bill tabled by Cheri DiNovo, a member of the provincial New Democratic Party, that would outlaw any attempt to change the gender or sexuality of a person under 18 via therapy. The bill passed unanimously in the Legislative Assembly of Ontario. Wynne, as the first openly gay Premier in Canada, stated that youths expressing their sexuality and gender identity should be protected, and that young LGBTQ people are especially vulnerable to these conversion therapy practices.

=== Manitoba ===
Also in 2015, Manitoban Health Minister Sharon Blady announced plans for the province to ban the practice of conversion therapy, and stated that conversion therapy had "no place" in Manitoba's healthcare system. This ban targeted the conversion of homosexual people to heterosexual, and had no specific provisions for transgender individuals being "converted" to cisgender.

=== Nova Scotia ===
A bill banning conversion therapy for sexual orientation and gender identity was passed unanimously in the House of Assembly of Nova Scotia in 2018. The bill, lauded by Nova Scotian Justice Minister Mark Furey as the "most progressive piece of legislation around sexual orientation and gender identity in the country", bans the promotion of such practices to persons under 19, but contains a very controversial clause allowing "mature minors" between the ages of 16 and 18 to consent to being subject to the practice.

=== British Columbia ===
Members of the Legislative Assembly of British Columbia tabled legislation to ban the practice of conversion therapy in 2019 and again in 2020, although neither private member's bill progressed passed first reading. In August 2019, the B.C. government called on the federal government to add conversion therapy into the Criminal Code of Canada and take action banning the practice nationwide.

==== Vancouver ====
Vancouver became the first jurisdiction in British Columbia to ban the practice for gender identity and sexual orientation in 2018. This ban, added to Vancouver's business prohibition bylaw, prohibits the offering of these services to people of any age and was passed unanimously by the Vancouver City Council.

=== Alberta ===
==== Edmonton ====
The city of Edmonton unanimously passed bylaw 19061, prohibiting conversion therapy within the city.

==== St. Albert ====
Though conversion therapy has not been known to happen in St. Albert, the city council unanimously passed a motion to ban it as a statement against the practice.

== Restrictions on rights ==
Both Alberta and Saskatchewan have laws that restrict the rights of transgender children and youth. The Alberta laws have been described as genocidal by the Lemkin Institute. New Brunswick has a policy that formerly required parental consent for students to use their chosen name and pronouns.

On October 6, 2025, OneBC party proposed a bill against gender-affirming healthcare, inspired by the model legislation of the US anti-trans organization Do No Harm. The bill would have prohibited doctors from providing puberty blockers and hormone therapy to minors, public funds from being used for gender transitions, and imposed the misgendering of students in schools. It would have also given parents and children 25 years after gender transition treatments to sue their doctors. The bill was defeated before its first reading, a rare occurrence, by a vote of 48 to 40.

=== Pronouns in schools ===
Saskatchewan and Alberta require parental involvement when students under 16 seek to use a different gender-related name or pronouns at school. Saskatchewan's Education Amendment Act, 2023 (Parents' Bill of Rights) came into force on October 20, 2023, and requires parental or guardian consent before school staff use a new gender-related preferred name or gender identity for a student under 16. The legislation invoked section 33 of the Canadian Charter of Rights and Freedoms in relation to sections 2, 7 and 15 of the Charter. In August 2025, the Saskatchewan Court of Appeal ruled that a constitutional challenge brought by UR Pride Center could continue, including consideration of whether the law limits Charter rights.

Alberta's Education Amendment Act, 2024 received royal assent on December 5, 2024. Its provisions concerning gender identity-related preferred names and pronouns took effect on September 1, 2025. School authorities must notify parents when a student requests a new gender identity-related name or pronouns, and parental consent is required before school staff may use them for students under 16. Students aged 16 or 17 do not require consent, although their parents must be notified. The legislation also provides for counselling or other assistance before parental notification where notification could reasonably be expected to cause psychological or emotional harm.

New Brunswick's Policy 713 followed a different course. Amendments introduced in 2023 required parental consent for formal use of a chosen first name by students under 16. A revised version of the policy took effect on January 1, 2025. Under the current policy, students under 16 may use a chosen first name or pronouns informally without parental consent, while parental consent remains required for formal use in official records and school administration.

=== Sports ===
In Alberta, the Fairness and Safety in Sport Act and its regulation came into force on September 1, 2025. The legislation requires covered amateur competitive sport organizations to adopt eligibility policies limiting participation in female-only leagues, classes and divisions for athletes aged 12 and older to athletes whose sex at birth is female. It does not apply to recreational activities such as intramural sport or physical education classes, and female athletes may continue to participate in male or co-educational categories. Athletes registering for female-only competition, or their parent or guardian if they are minors, must confirm that they meet the eligibility requirements. A birth registration document is not required at registration, but may be required if an athlete's eligibility is formally challenged.

In December 2025, Alberta enacted the Protecting Alberta's Children Statutes Amendment Act, applying the notwithstanding clauses of the Canadian Charter of Rights and Freedoms, the Alberta Bill of Rights and the Alberta Human Rights Act to the Fairness and Safety in Sport Act and its regulation. Also in December 2025, Skate Canada announced that it would no longer select Alberta to host national or international events, sayign that the provincial legislation was incompatible with its standards for safe and inclusive sport. The organization stated that the decision did not prevent Alberta athletes from participating in Skate Canada programs or competitions outside the province. Skate Canada's 2026-27 national event calendar subsequently listed its major competitions in other provinces, while its Alberta section continued to organize provincial competitions within Alberta.

=== Health care ===
The Health Statutes Amendment Act would prohibit children under 16 from accessing puberty blockers for the purpose of treating gender dysphoria and all minors from receiving gender reassignment surgery. In June 2025, a judge temporarily blocked Alberta's ban, saying that withholding gender affirming care from minors will cause "irreparable harm". Smith has vowed to appeal the ruling, and has since invoked the notwithstanding clause to force the application of said legislation.

=== Prisons ===
At the federal level, the Correctional Service of Canada (CSC) permits gender-diverse offenders to request placement or transfer to a men's or women's institution that aligns with their gender identity or expression, regardless of their anatomy or the sex or gender market on their identification documents. Requests are assessed individually and may be refused where CSC determines that they are overriding health or safety concerns that cannot be resolved. CSC policy also requires staff to use an offender's chosen first or middle name and pronouns, and individualized accommodation protocols may address matters including searches, private shower and toilet access, clothing and personal property.

As of 2025, CSC reported that 90 self-identified transgender women were incarcerated in federal institutions; 73 were housed in men's institutions and 17 in women's institutions. Between the 2017-18 and 2024-25 fiscal years, CSC received 129 requests from people assigned male at birth seeking placement or transfer to a women's institution. Of these requests, 35 were approved, 72 were denied and 22 were withdrawn.

The Office of the Correctional Investigator described CSC's 2022 gender-diversity policy as an important change, but raised concerns about the lack of clear parameters for what constitutes an "overriding health or safety concern" and the absence of a dedicated mechanism for gender-diverse prisoners to report abuse. Its 2022-23 annual report also recorded complaints involving discrimination, harassment, physical and sexual abuse, improper search procedures and derogatory language. Provincial correctional policies vary; Ontario, for example, generally places transgender inmates according to their self-identified gender or housing preference unless unresolved health or safety concerns prevent such placement.

=== Gender-neutral language ===
According to various pieces of legislature passed in Canada, including Bill C-16, it is recommended to use the word 'they' or the person's preferred name when unaware of their preferred pronouns. It also can be used as a potential defense when somebody is prosecuted under the mentioned act, as it does not specifically address pronoun usage in clear, precise language.

== Medical and/or parental consent required by area ==
Jurisdiction	Eligibility	Medical and/or parental consent required?
Federal Government	Yes for Citizens, Permanent Residents, Temporary Residents, Protected Persons and Refugee Claimants	None for adults
Federal Government	Yes for Citizens, Permanent Residents, Temporary Residents, Protected Persons and Refugee Claimants	Parent or guardian's permission required for minors
Alberta	Yes for persons born in Alberta; No for Albertan residents born out of province	None for adults
Alberta	Yes for persons born in Alberta; No for Albertan residents born out of province	Parent or guardian's permission required for youth aged 12–17
Alberta	Yes for persons born in Alberta; No for Albertan residents born out of province	Professional's certification required for youth aged 11 or younger
British Columbia	Yes for persons born in British Columbia; No for British Columbia residents born out of province	None for adults
British Columbia	Yes for persons born in British Columbia; No for British Columbia residents born out of province	Parent or guardian's permission required for youth aged 18 or younger
British Columbia	Yes for persons born in British Columbia; No for British Columbia residents born out of province	Supporting certification from a prescribed professional required for youth aged 11 or younger
Manitoba	Yes for persons born in Manitoba and Citizens of Canada residing in Manitoba for one year, no for all other Manitoban residents	None for adults
Manitoba	Yes for persons born in Manitoba and Citizens of Canada residing in Manitoba for one year, no for all other Manitoban residents	Supporting certification from a prescribed professional required for youth aged 17 or younger
New Brunswick	Yes for all New Brunswick residents (three months' residency requirement), and New Brunswick-born persons.	Supporting certification from a prescribed professional required for all applicants
Newfoundland and Labrador	Yes for all Newfoundland and Labrador residents (three months' residency requirement) and Newfoundland and Labrador-born persons	None for persons age 16+
Newfoundland and Labrador	Yes for all Newfoundland and Labrador residents (three months' residency requirement) and Newfoundland and Labrador-born persons	One supporting certification from a prescribed professional required for minors age 12-15
Newfoundland and Labrador	Yes for all Newfoundland and Labrador residents (three months' residency requirement) and Newfoundland and Labrador-born persons	Two supporting certifications required for minors under age 12
Northwest Territories	Yes for persons born in the NWT, No for NWT residents born out of territory (amendment pending)	Partially, supporting certification from a prescribed professional required for minors under 19 (and independent minors between 16 and 18)
Nova Scotia	Yes for all Nova Scotian residents (three months' residency requirement) and Nova Scotia-born persons	Partially, supporting certification from a prescribed professional required for minors 15 and under
Nunavut	Yes for persons born in Nunavut, No for Nunavummiut born out of territory	No data
Ontario	Yes for persons born in Ontario; Ontario residents born out of province may only change their IDs and not their birth certificates/vital statistics documents	Yes, supporting certification from a prescribed professional required for all applicants; Parent's applying on behalf of their child must get the consent of all other persons with custody and the child, but a person applying on their own behalf does not need parental consent.
Prince Edward Island	Yes for persons born on PEI, No for PEI residents born out of province	Yes, physician's certification required
Quebec	Yes for all Québec residents (one year residency requirement) and Québec-born persons	None for persons age 18+
Quebec	Yes for all Québec residents (one year residency requirement) and Québec-born persons	A medical professional or social worker's letter is required for trans youth under the age of 18; currently under appeal
Quebec	Yes for all Québec residents (one year residency requirement) and Québec-born persons	Double parental consent is also required if the youth is under the age of 14
Saskatchewan	Yes for persons born in Saskatchewan, No for Saskatchewan residents born out of province	Yes, psychologist or physician's statement required
Yukon	Yes for persons born in the Yukon, No for Yukon residents born out of territory	Partially; parental consent required, as well as medical practitioner/psychologist/registered nurse/social worker/lawyer/teacher/First Nations chief or councillor/school counsellor's supporting statement for minors under 16

== See also ==
- Transgender rights
- Name change
- Outline of transgender topics
- LGBTQ rights in Canada
- Intersex rights in Canada
- Canadian values
