= Facial feminization surgery =

Gender-affirming surgery to alter the face towards a female morphology

Facial feminization surgery (FFS) is an umbrella term for surgical procedures that modify masculine facial features to achieve a feminine appearance using reconstructive surgery techniques.

FFS is performed almost exclusively on trans women and other transfeminine individuals. While feminizing hormone therapy (using estradiol and frequently antiandrogens) can change facial appearance via fat redistribution, it cannot change masculine bone structure, such as a prominent brow ridge, wider nose, or larger chin; because of this, FFS is a medically necessary treatment and in many cases is required to treat gender dysphoria.

The procedures performed during FFS vary based on an individual's priorities and facial features, but the surgery frequently includes work to address the forehead, nose, chin, and jawline. Coverage by health insurance varies significantly by location; some US states have passed laws requiring health insurance companies to cover FFS.

== Medical necessity ==
FFS may be medically indicated to alleviate the suffering caused by persistent gender incongruence (gender dysphoria). Medical guidelines should be consulted to assist in determining the indication. If hormone therapy does not achieve sufficient feminization of the face and an unbiased observer continues to perceive it as male, the lack of perception as a woman can make the person's everyday life difficult or even impossible and perpetuate gender dysphoria. A distinction is made between aesthetic surgical procedures and FFS, which modifies sex-typical characteristics and constitutes medically necessary treatment.

Numerous studies conclude that FFS can significantly improve the well-being and quality of life of trans women by reducing gender dysphoria, with a low complication rate. Compared to the general female population and to trans women who had undergone gender-affirming genital surgery, FFS, or both, the mental health-related quality of life of trans women who had not undergone any surgical procedures was statistically lower.

A review shows that the evidence for an improvement in quality of life with a reduction in gender dysphoria through FFS has grown and has now reached a higher level of evidence. It is recommended that specific facial feminization surgeries, including Adam's apple reduction and facial hair removal, be included in international guidelines as medically necessary treatments.

For the indication, a psychotherapeutic letter must be obtained in accordance with current guidelines on mental distress and the necessity of FFS to alleviate it. In this context, it is desirable, but not a prerequisite, for the person seeking treatment to have collected everyday experiences. If practitioners have doubts about the medical necessity of FFS, a second opinion should be sought from an expert colleague.

== History ==
FFS techniques originate from the fields of maxillofacial surgery, otolaryngology and plastic-reconstructive surgery.

FFS was first considered in 1982 when surgeon Darrell Pratt, who performed genital reassignment surgeries, approached Douglas Ousterhout to operate on a trans woman. The patient wanted to have surgery on her face to look more feminine, as people still reacted to her as if she were a man. In his previous practice, Ousterhout had already reconstructed the faces and skulls of people who had been affected by birth defects, accidents or other traumas. Although he was interested in helping, he did not know what constituted a female face. So he first studied early 20th-century anthropology to find out which features were considered feminine. He then derived measurements that defined these features from cephalograms taken in the 1970s. Finally, he worked with a set of several hundred skulls to see if he could reliably distinguish which skulls were female and which were male based on these measurements. Ousterhout then determined which surgical techniques and materials he was already using to transform a male face into a female one. He pioneered most of the FFS procedures and was also involved in their subsequent improvements.

== Surgical procedures ==
The following are typical surgical procedures performed during FFS. The choice of procedures should focus on typically male characteristics. Computer-assisted imaging techniques (such as CT and MRI) should be used to identify male features and simplify planning.

=== Upper third of the face ===
Feminization of the upper third of the face is considered a safe procedure that has a significant effect on gender perception. Compared to the lower jaw or midface region, the influence of feminization of the upper third of the face on gender perception is significantly higher. Some studies have shown that the shape of the forehead is one of the main differences between men and women. Hairline correction, forehead correction, eye socket correction and eyebrow lift are procedures that are often performed at the same time as rhinoplasty.

==== Receding hairline ====
In men, the hairline is often higher than in women and usually has receding corners above the temples, giving it an 'M' shape. The hairline can be moved forward and given a rounder shape, either by lowering the hairline, lifting and repositioning the scalp, or with a hair transplant. In addition to hairline advancement, temporal rotation flaps may be used to excise skin near the temples where hair no longer grows due to androgenic alopecia, further feminizing the hairline shape.

==== Forehead reconstruction ====
Men typically have a horizontal bone ridge that runs across the forehead just above the eyebrows, known as the brow ridge, which also includes the supraorbital ridges (the lower ridge on which the eyebrows sit). Men also tend to have indented temples and a flatter forehead than women.

The brow ridge is usually solid bone and can be easily sanded down. The section of the brow ridge between the eyebrows (the glabella) lies above a cavity called the frontal sinus. Because the frontal sinus is hollow, it can be more difficult to remove the bump there. If the bone above the frontal sinus is thick enough, the bump can be removed by simply grinding down the bone. However, in some people, the bone wall is so thin that it is not possible to completely grind down the bump without breaking through the wall to the frontal sinus.

FFS surgeons have adopted two main approaches to solve this problem. The most conservative approach is to grind down the bony wall as much as possible without breaking it, and then build up the area around the remaining bulge with hydroxyapatite bone cement, which can even out any visible steps between the remaining bulge and the rest of the forehead. In these cases, additional reduction of the protrusion can sometimes be achieved by thinning the overlying soft tissue. Alternatively, FFS surgeons may perform a procedure called forehead reconstruction or cranioplasty, in which the glabella bone is taken apart, thinned and reshaped, and reassembled in the new feminine position using small titanium wires or an orthopaedic plate made of titanium and screws. Data on which approach is better is limited and does not provide guidance. Risks of cranioplasty include improper healing of the skull, movement of bone fragments, and cyst formation; these can usually be corrected with another procedure.

==== Brow lift ====
Compared to women, men tend to have lower eyebrows in terms of the position of their brow ridge. In addition, men's eyebrows tend to lie below the brow ridge, while women's eyebrows tend to lie above the brow ridge. Accordingly, FFS leads to a more feminine appearance by raising the eyebrows.

==== Orbital reconstruction ====
Some studies have shown that eye shape is the most important distinguishing feature between men and women. Female eye sockets (orbits) tend to be smaller, sit higher on the face, have sharper outer edges and are closer together at their inner edges. Some FFS procedures alter the shape of the eye socket. Standard rhinoplasty procedures are generally used. However, there is limited data on the results.

=== Middle third of the face ===
==== Rhinoplasty ====
Male noses are generally larger, longer and wider than female noses; in addition, the tip of the nose is more often visibly upturned in women than in men. Therefore, bone and cartilage are removed during the procedure and the remaining parts are remodelled. In most cases, this is performed using an open procedure, but endonasal procedures have also been used; in all cases, there is a risk that reducing the size of the nose will impair the function of the nasal valves. According to a case study, rhinoplasty is one of the factors that has the greatest influence on most trans women being perceived as female.

==== Cheek reconstruction ====
In women, the cheekbones are often more prominent and the cheeks are fuller overall, forming a triangle between the cheekbone and the tip of the chin. The planning of cheek contouring is carried out simultaneously with the planning of chin reshaping. The cheeks are reshaped by removing bone and repositioning the facial bones. It is common to enlarge the cheeks with implants or with fat harvested from other parts of the body. Risks associated with implants include infection and the possibility that the implant may shift and become asymmetrical; fat may eventually be absorbed.

==== Lip lift ====
Subtle changes in the shape and structure of the lips can have a significant impact on feminization. The distance between the base of the nose and the upper edge of the upper lip tends to be longer in men than in women, and the upper lip is longer; when a woman's mouth is open and relaxed, the upper incisors are often exposed by a few millimetres.

Typically, an incision is made just below the bridge of the nose and a piece of skin is removed. When the gap is closed, the upper lip is lifted and moved into a more feminine position, often exposing part of the upper incisors. The surgeon may also roll the upper lip outwards slightly through a lip lift, making it appear fuller.

=== Lower third of the face ===
==== Chin and jawline ====
Men's chins tend to be longer and wider than women's, with a more square base, and protrude more outward than women's. The jawline of men of the same sex tends to extend outward from the chin at a wider angle than that of women of the same sex and has a sharp corner at the back end.

The length of the chin can be reduced either by bone shaving or by a procedure known as sliding genioplasty, in which part of the bone is removed. The jaw can be reshaped by jaw reduction surgery, which is sometimes performed through the mouth. The masseter muscle can also be reduced to make the jaw appear narrower.

The greatest risk with these procedures is damage to the mental nerve, which runs through the chin and jaw; other risks include damage to tooth roots, infection, non-union and damage to the mentalis muscle, which controls the lower lip and is located at the edges of the chin.

==== Chondrolaryngoplasty ====
After puberty, men tend to have a much more pronounced thyroid cartilage than women (known as the Adam's apple). The Adam's apple can be reduced in size using a procedure called chondrolaryngoplasty; the aim of the procedure is to reduce the size without leaving a scar. There is a risk of damage to the vocal cords and destabilisation of the epiglottis.

== Coverage by health insurance ==
The coverage of costs by the respective health insurance companies varies significantly from country to country. While it is common practice in Europe in France, Belgium and the Netherlands, for example, it is difficult in Germany due to individual assessments by the Medical Service. In Switzerland, too, coverage can be obtained following a court ruling in 2018.

In the United States, the situation has improved significantly thanks to the Affordable Care Act, and the number of cases where health insurance companies cover the costs has risen significantly. In addition, many states have passed laws prohibiting health insurance companies from excluding gender-affirming surgery. California in particular is considered a pioneer in this area.

== See also ==
- Facial masculinization surgery – Gender-affirming surgery to alter the face towards a masculine morphology
- Gender-affirming surgery – Surgical procedures to affirm gender identity
- Gender-affirming hormone therapy – Gender-affirming medical treatment
- Gender dysphoria – Mental distress due to gender incongruence
