= Douglas Ousterhout =

American surgeon

Douglas K. Ousterhout is a retired craniofacial surgeon who practiced in San Francisco, CA, United States. His specialty was facial feminization surgery for trans women, and he was widely considered the foremost facial feminization surgeon in the United States. Ousterhout also pioneered facial masculinization surgery for people undergoing female-to-male gender reassignment. Ousterhout received MD and DDS degrees from the University of Michigan Ann Arbor. He is a voluntary clinical professor of surgery in the School of Medicine and an adjunct professor of dentistry in the Dental School at University of California, San Francisco.

Facial feminization surgery (FFS) began in 1982 when Darrell Pratt, a plastic surgeon who performed sex reassignment surgeries, approached Ousterhout with a request from a trans woman, a patient of Pratt's who wanted plastic surgery to make her face appear more feminine, since people still reacted to her as though she were a man. Ousterhout's prior practice had involved reconstructing faces and skulls of people who had suffered birth defects, accidents or other trauma. Ousterhout was interested in helping but knew that he didn't know what a "female face" was, so he investigated by first reading the physical anthropology from the early 20th century to identify what features were "female", then by deriving measurements defining those features from a series of cephalograms taken in the 1970s, and then by working with a set of several hundred skulls to see if he could reliably differentiate which were females and which were males using those measurements. Ousterhout then began working out what surgical techniques and materials he already used that he could apply in order to transform a male face into a female face; he pioneered most of the procedures involved in FFS and was involved in their subsequent improvements as well.

FFS generally involves advancing the hairline, making the forehead smaller and rounder, reducing the brow ridge, shortening and narrowing the nose, shortening the upper lip, shortening the chin, narrowing the jaw, and reducing the laryngeal prominence. As of 2006 there were only about twelve surgeons in the world performing FFS.

Notable Ousterhout patients who have written about their surgery include Lynn Conway, Andrea James, and Nicole Hamilton.

== Wine ==
Ousterhout and wife Nancy also own and manage Ousterhout Wine and Vineyards. Wine & Spirits website featured their 2012 Zinfandel as part of National Zinfandel Day in 2015 and their 2011 Zinfandel as part of the 2014 California Wine Month celebration.

== Personal life ==
Ousterhout lived in the Mrs. Doubtfire home, which he bought in 1997. The title character in the movie, played by Robin Williams, is a divorced man who pretends to be an older female nanny so he can be around his children. Ousterhout briefly knew Williams and liked the connection, explaining, "I turn boys' faces into girls' faces. It seemed only natural." In 2015, an arsonist assumed to be a disgruntled former patient of Ousterhout tried to set the front door on fire.

== See also ==
- Jordan Deschamps-Braly

== Publications ==
- Ousterhout, Douglas K., ed. (1991). Aesthetic Contouring of the Craniofacial Skeleton. Lippincott Williams and Wilkins. ISBN 0-316-67410-9.
