= Sling (implant) =

Implant providing support to a body tissue

In surgery, a sling is an implant that is intended to provide additional support to a particular tissue. It usually consists of a synthetic mesh material in the shape of a narrow ribbon but sometimes a biomaterial (bovine or porcine) or the patient's own tissue. The ends are usually attached to a fixed body part such as the skeleton.

== In stress incontinence ==
In stress incontinence, a sling is a potential method of treatment, and is placed under the urethra through one vaginal incision and two small abdominal incisions. The idea is to replace the deficient pelvic floor muscles and provide a backboard of support under the urethra.

For this purpose, Pelvicol (a porcine dermal sling) implant sling had a comparable patient-determined success rate with TVT.

== In female genital prolapse ==
Slings can also be used in the surgical management of female genital prolapse.

== Chin sling ==
A chin sling is a synthetic lining used in chin augmentation to lift the tissues under the chin and neck. The sling is surgically implanted under the skin of the chin and hooked behind the ears, giving a more youthful appearance, and reversing the effects of aging such as accumulated fat, lost skin elasticity and stretched muscle lining, all of which cause the neck to droop and sag.
