= Gary Alter =

American surgeon

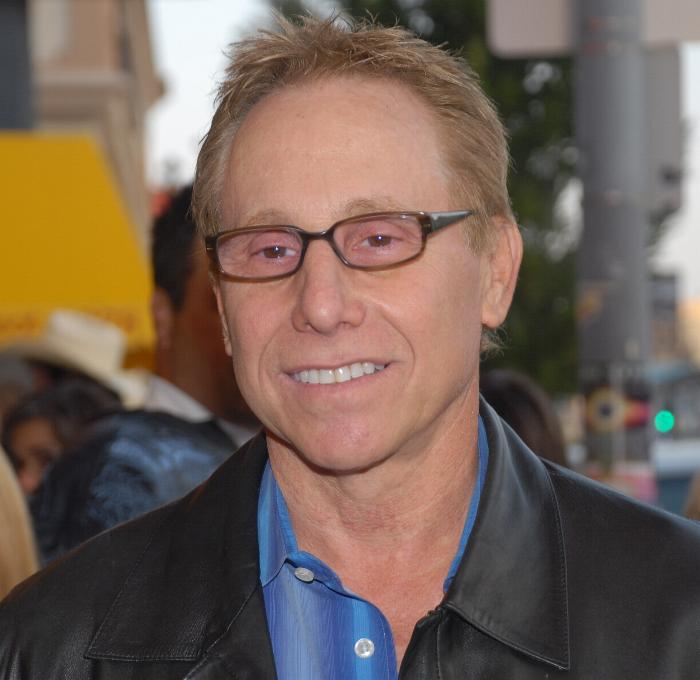
Gary Alter

Gary J. Alter is an American plastic surgeon. His specialties include sex reassignment surgery, genital reconstruction surgery and facial feminization surgery. He appeared in two episodes of the reality television series, Dr. 90210. PRNewswire reported on June 5, 2015 that Dr. Gary J. Alter performed the body work plastic surgery on Caitlyn Jenner. He has a practice in Beverly Hills, CA.

Alter was one of the first physicians with Board Certification by both the American Board of Plastic Surgery and the American Board of Urology. He is an assistant clinical professor of plastic surgery at UCLA School of Medicine. Alter's sub-specialty is in genital plastic surgery, especially genital reconstruction. He has invented many original surgical procedures adopted by other plastic surgeons in the field, including the "Alter Central-Wedge labiaplasty technique".

== Education ==
Alter attended the University of California, Berkeley without completing his Bachelor's degree. Afterwards, he enrolled in UCLA School of Medicine and received his Doctor of Medicine degree. At the time, it was possible to enroll in medical school upon the completion of prerequisite coursework.

== Television shows ==
Alter was featured on E! Entertainment's programs Dr. 90210 and Botched. He has been highlighted on Alexis Arquette: She's My Brother (documentary) and on the TLC show Strange Sex, discussing hidden penis syndrome. He has appeared on the Discovery Health Network, TLC, CNN, the Larry King Show, and was a recurrent guest on "Red Eye" on the Fox News Channel. He has also been featured in numerous media outlets including the New York Times, the Los Angeles Times, the Wall Street Journal, USA Today, Allure, Self, Glamour, Marie Claire, Cosmopolitan, and Health.

== Publications ==
Alter has been published in numerous medical journals and textbooks pertaining to his specialty and has co-edited a textbook.

- “ A new technique for correction of the hidden penis in adults and children”, Gary J. Alter and Richard Ehrlich, Journal of Urology 161:455, 1999
- “Penile enhancement surgery”, Gary J. Alter, Techniques in Urology, 4:70, 1998
- “A new technique for aesthetic labia minora reduction”, Gary J. Alter, Annals of Plastic Surgery 40:287, 1998
- “Use of prefabricated tunica vaginalis fascia flap to reconstruct the tunica albuginea after recurrent penile prosthesis extrusion”, GJ Alter, J Greisman, PE Werthman, AS Seid, BJ Joseph; Journal of Urology 159:128,1998
- “Reconstruction of deformities resulting from penile enlargement surgery”, Gary J. Alter; Journal of Urology 158:2153, 1997
- RE: Complications of penile lengthening and augmentation seen at 1 referral center”, Letter to the editor. Journal of Urology 156:1784, 1996
- “Penis enhancement”, Gary J. Alter; Aesthetic Surgery Quarterly Vol 16:226, 1996
- “Penis enhancement”, Gary J. Alter; Advances in Urology Vol 9, p 225-254, 1996, Mosby, Chicago
- “Penis enhancement”, Gary J. Alter; AUA Update Series, Lesson 12, Volume XV: p 99-100, 1996, American Urological Association; Houston, Texas,
- “Split thickness skin graft urethroplasty and tunica vaginalis flaps for failed hypospadias repairs”, Richard M. Ehrlich and Gary J. Alter; Journal of Urology 155:131, 1995
- “Augmentation phalloplasty”, Gary J. Alter; Urologic Clinics of North America Vol 22, N 4, p 887-902 November 1995, W.B. Saunders, Philadelphia
- “Prosthetic implantation after phallic construction”, Gary J. Alter, David A. Gilbert, Steven M. Schlossberg, Gerald N. Jordan; Microsurgery 16:322, 1995
- “Use of tunica vaginalis in hypospadias cripples”, Richard Ehrlich, Gary J. Alter; Society for Pediatric Urology Newsletter September 26, 1994
- “Total phallic reconstruction”, Guy Trengove-Jones and Gary J. Alter; Dialogues in Pediatric Urology Vol 18, No 3, 4-6, 1995
- “Penile implantation in total phalloplasty”, Gerald Jordan, Gary J. Alter, David Gilbert, Charles Horton; Journal of Urology 152: 410, 1994
- “Buried penis as a contraindication for circumcision”, Gary J. Alter, Charles E. Horton, Charles E, Horton Jr.; Journal of the American College of Surgeons 178:487, 1994
- “Hemangioma of the penis and scrotum”, Gary J. Alter, Guy Trengove-Jones, Charles E. Horton Jr.; Urology August 1993
- “Experience with vaginal reconstruction utilizing the modified Singapore flap”, John E. Woods, Gary J. Alter, N. Bradly Meland, Karl Podratz; Plastic and Reconstructive Surgery 90:270, 1992
