= Alter Levin =

Hebrew-language writer and poet

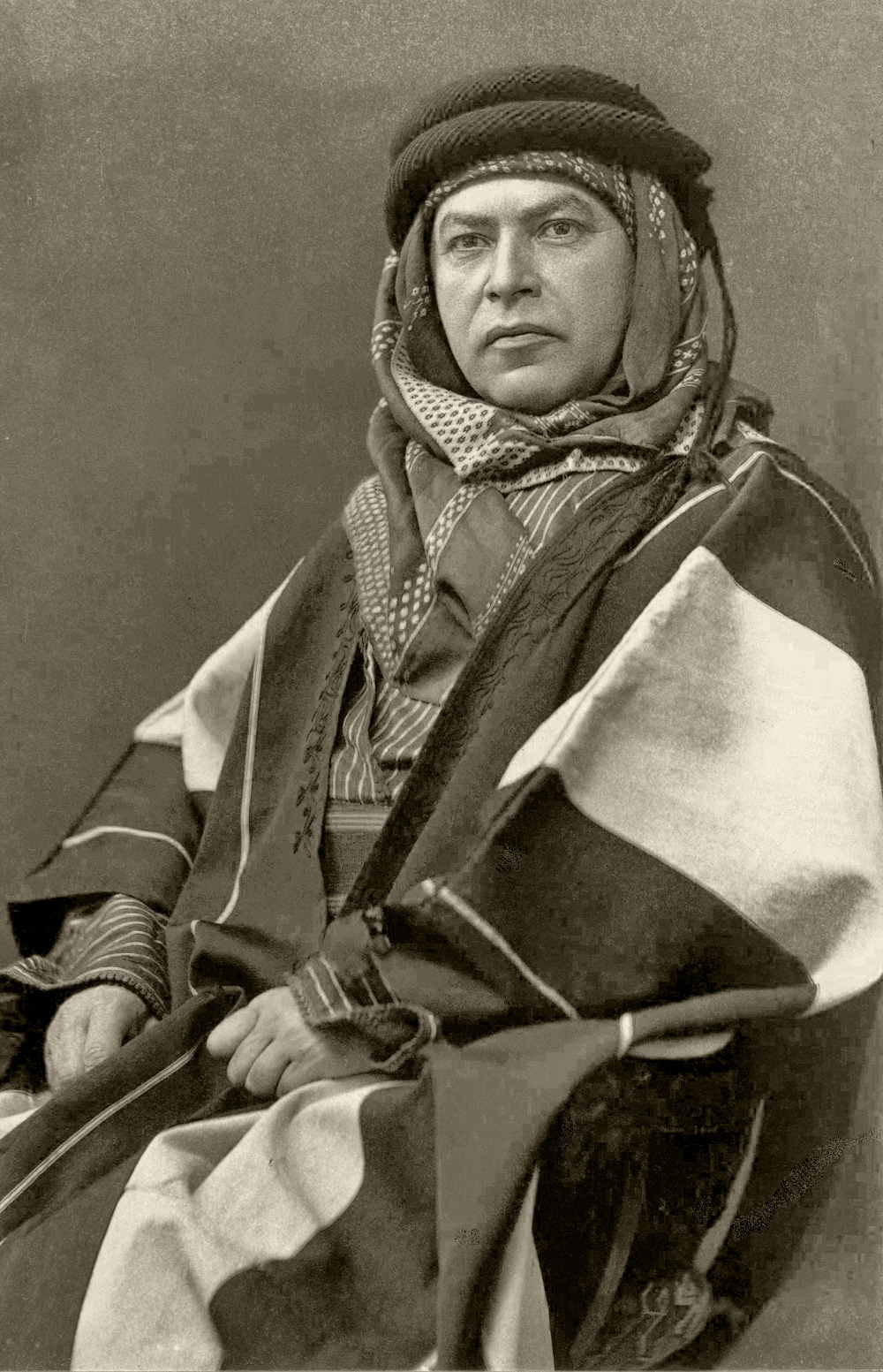
- Portrait by Halil Ra’ad
- Born: 4 January 1883; Minsk, Russian Empire
- Died: 4 October 1933 (aged 50); Jerusalem, Mandatory Palestine
- Resting place: Mount of Olives Jewish Cemetery
- Writing career
- Pen name: Asaph ha-Levi; Ish Yerushalayim
- Language: Hebrew

Alter Isaac Levin (Hebrew: אלתר יצחק לוין; 4 January 1883 – 4 October 1933), also known by the pen name Asaph ha-Levi (Hebrew: אסף הלוי), was a Hebrew-language writer and poet.

Born in Minsk, he immigrated to Ottoman Jerusalem (later Mandatory Palestine) in 1891, studying there at the Etz Chaim Yeshiva. During World War I he conducted espionage for the British. He committed suicide in 1933.

== Publications ==
- Megillat Kedem le-Asaf ha-Levi Ish Yerushalayim (in Hebrew). Jerusalem: Hotsaʼat Dekel. 1920.
- Shirei Am (in Hebrew). Jerusalem: Defus Aḥdut. 1920.
