= Israel Alter =

Austrian-Hungarian cantor

Israel Alter (also: Yisraʾel Alter, born September 23, 1901 in Lemberg, died November 16, 1979, in New York City) was an Austrian-Hungarian Jewish cantor and last chief cantor in Hanover, Germany. The well traveled composer was regarded as "the one Chasanim, the cantor of the cantors".

== Family ==
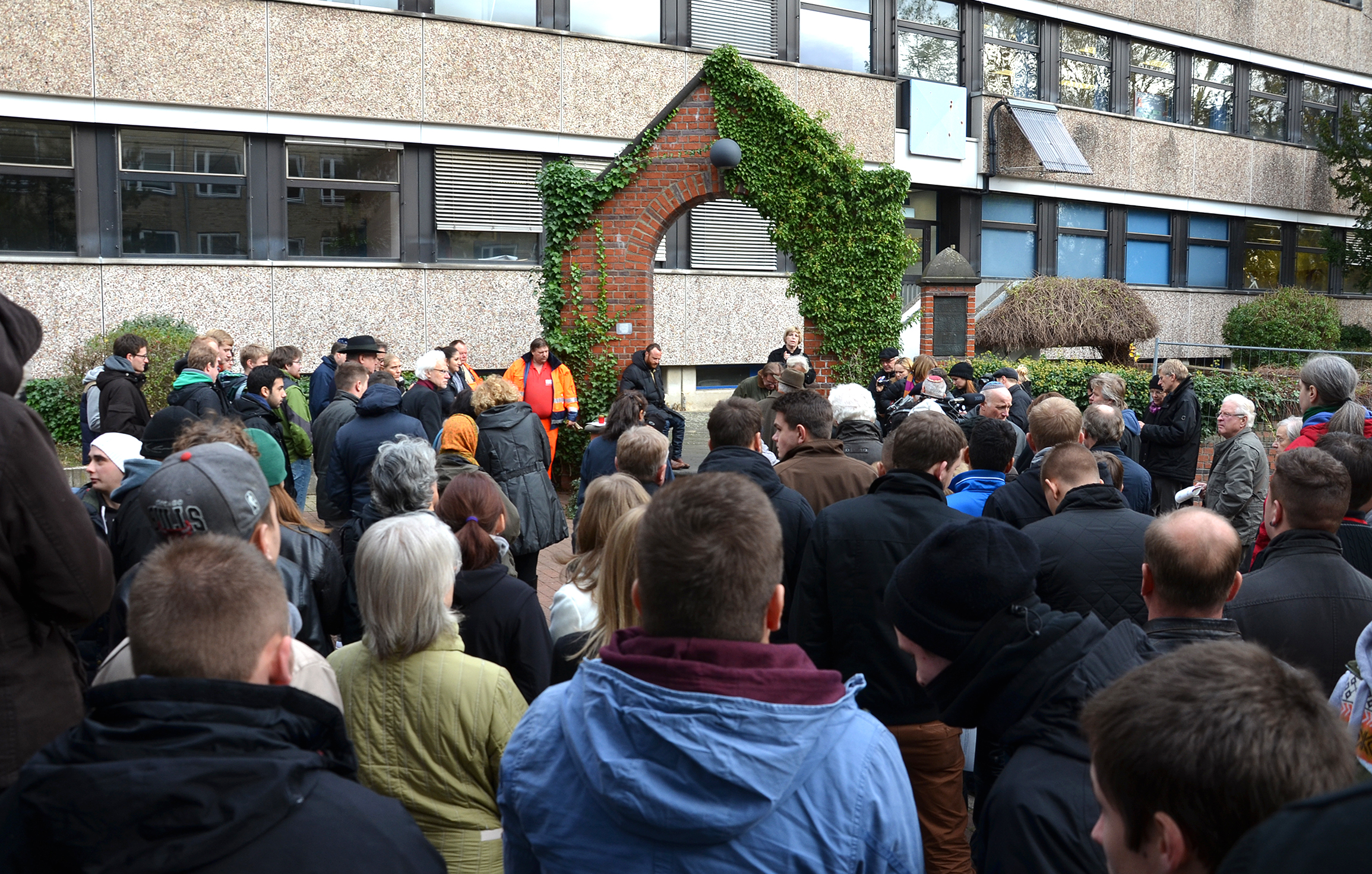
In 2013 many students from the vocational school that is located at Ohestraße participated at the installation of the Stolpersteine

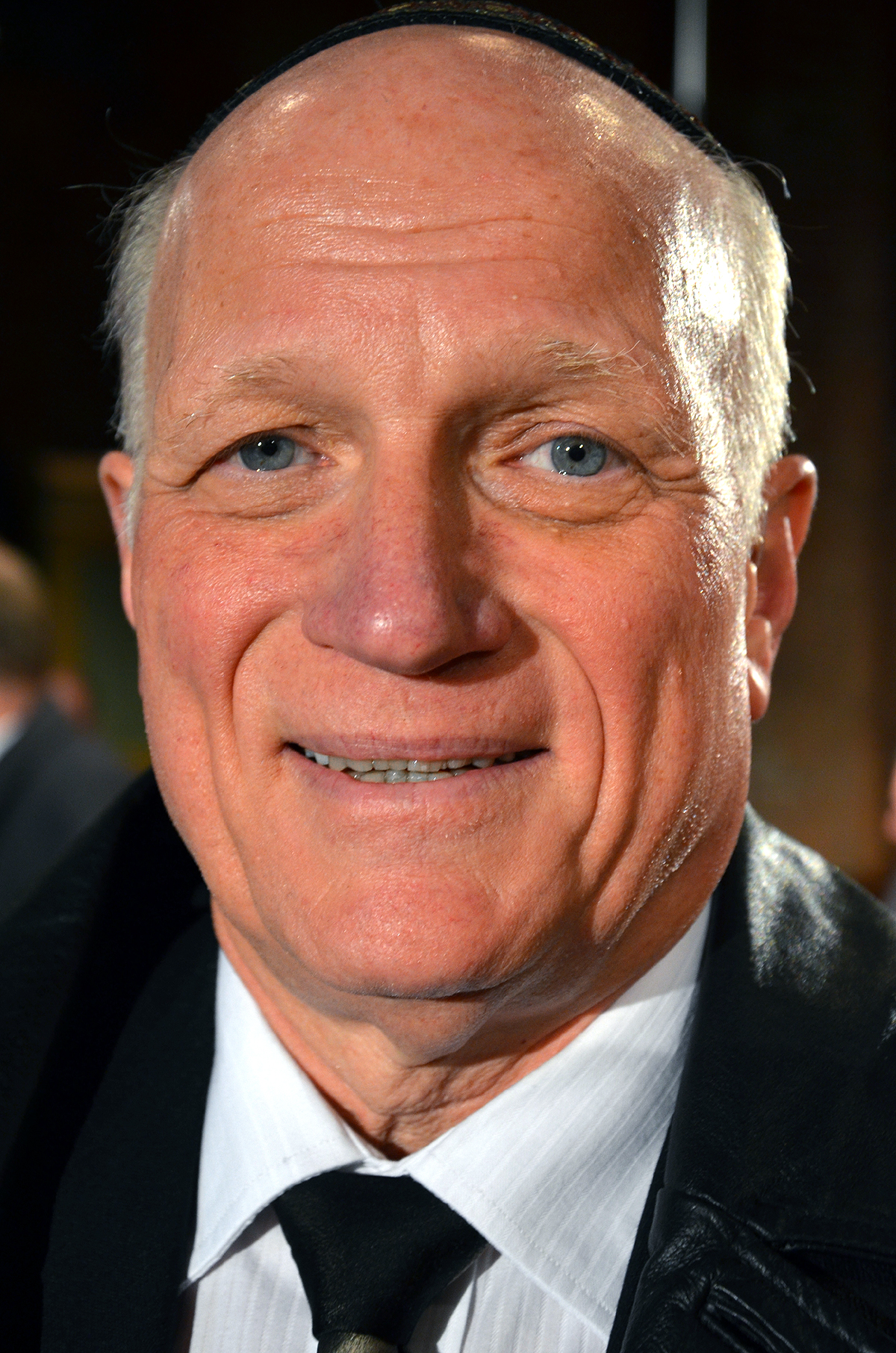
Benjamin Z Maissner z"l, cantor and musical director at Holy Blossom Temple in Toronto and of the Jewish chamber choir Lachan

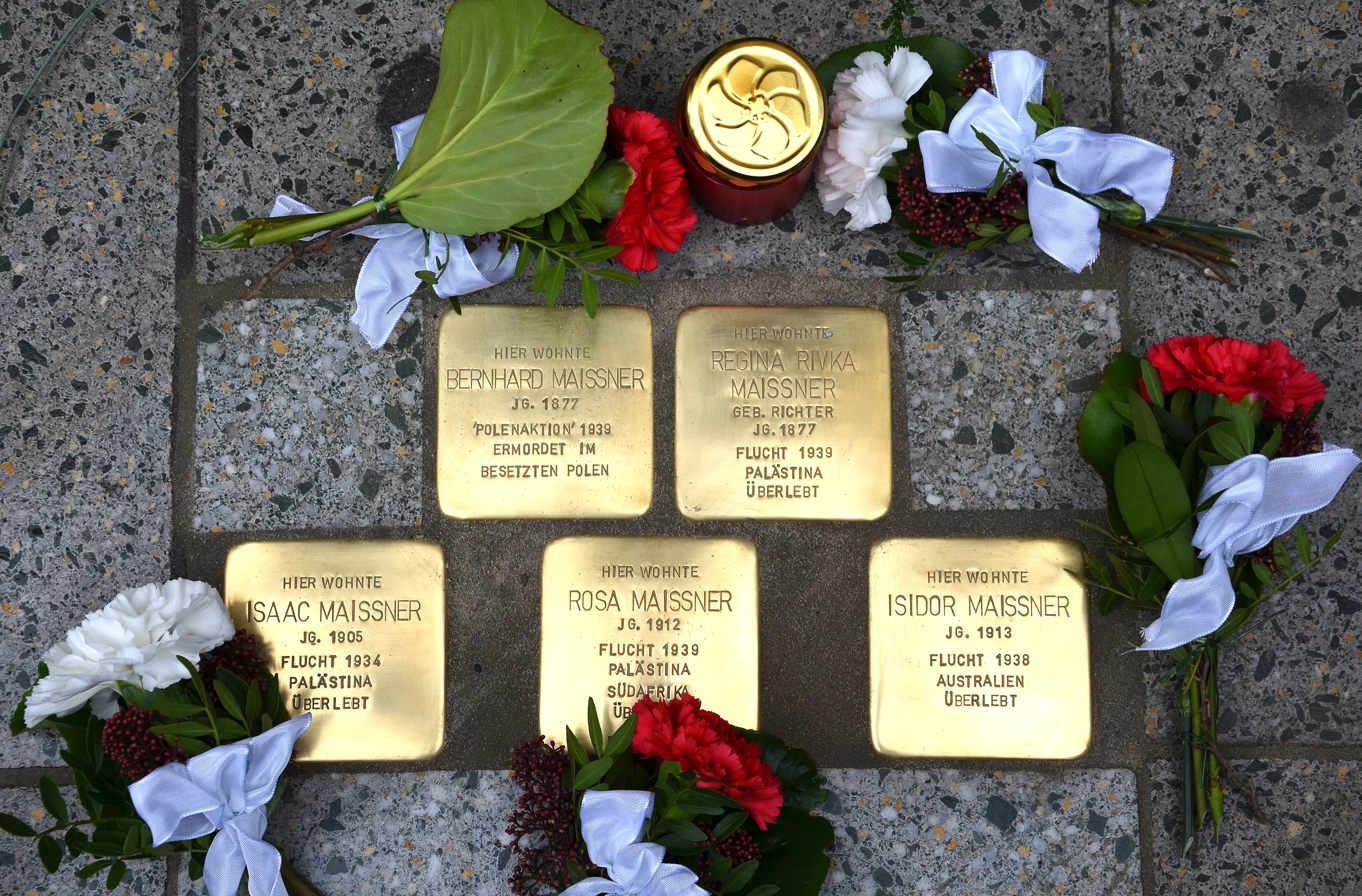
Five remembrance stones for the Maissner family installed at Lange Laube 1; Bernhard Maissner was murdered in occupied Poland; four family members escaped in 1939 to South Africa and Palestine

Israel Alter was the son of the merchant Abraham Juda Alter and his wife Frajda Alter, born Klein. He had a brother who later also became cantor. Israel was married to Anna Brenner (born 1901), their children Eleasar (born 1923) and Klara (born 1926). Anna's siblings were Hermann Hersch Sobel-Brenner (born 1903), David Sobel-Brenner (born 1907) and Regina Brenner (born 1912) with whom the Alter family lived under one roof at the Ohestraße 6 in Hanover, Germany, until their expulsion. At this address a memorial site has been established and on November 12, 2013, seven Stolpersteine have been installed, for this occasion "family members from Canada and Israel were present".

Israel Alter was the uncle of cantor Benjamin Z. Maissner z"l. He is related to Bernhard Maissner (also known as Bejrich Bernhard Majzner, born December 15, 1877, in Przyrow/Piotow/Russia; during the so-called "Polish intervention" on October 28, 1938, forced to Bentschen (Zbąszyń), on August 10, 1939, deported to the Treblinka extermination camp, later declared perished), his wife Regina Rivka Richter (born 1877) and their children Issac (born 1905), Rosa (born 1912) and Isodor (born 1913). For these last seven family members mentioned seven remembrance stones were also installed on November 12, 2013, in front of the building at Lange Laube 1.

== Biography ==
Israel Alter studied Talmud in Lemberg and Vienna. At the age of 20 he received his first posting as a cantor at the synagogue called Vereinssynagoge Brigittenauer Tempel.

During the time of the Weimar Republic Israel Alter took the post of chief cantor at the "Neue Synagogue" in Hanover. At the same time he performed "many times in many places in concert halls all over Europe", until in 1929 and 1930 he went on tour in the United States, where for example he performed twice at Carnegie Hall.

After the Nazis came to power in 1933, antisemitic and organized and discriminatory laws and dictatorship also came to Hanover, especially targeting Jews. For this reason Israel Alter immigrated in 1935 first to South Africa. He became cantor of the largest synagogue of Johannesburg, the synagogue of the United Hebrew Congregation. In 1961, Alter immigrated to the US, where he worked as a cantor in New York.

== Inheritance ==
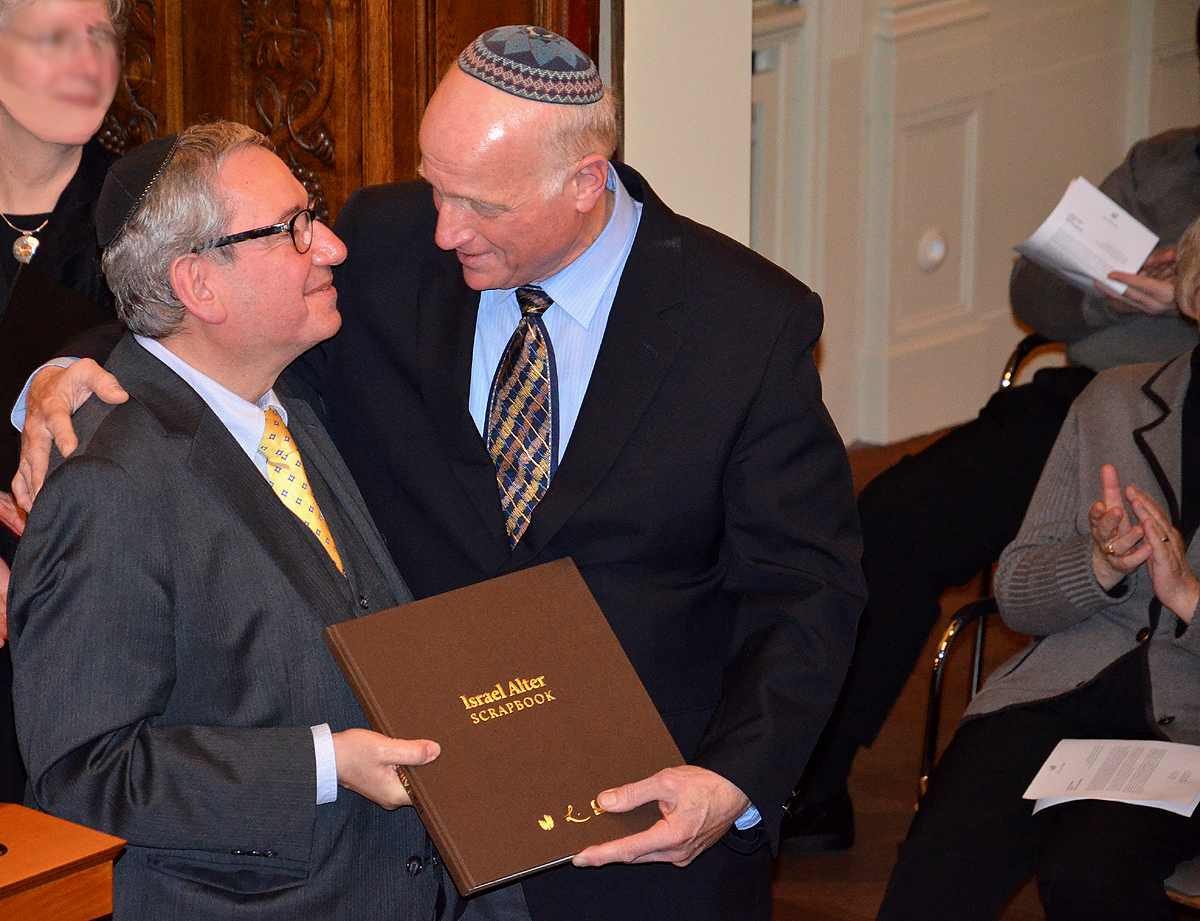
Two friends in Villa Seligmann: Andor Izsák (left) and Benjamin Z. Maissner at the book launch for the Israel Alter Scrapbook

Among the inheritances of Israel Alter was a scrap book containing a collection of newspaper clippings of concert reviews in several languages (see section literature). Also found were recordings of great historical importance of Alter's singing and compositions. Forty records from as early as 1930 were found, including a recording of the Prayer for the Souls, a piece dedicated to the fallen soldiers of World War I, which is usually not permitted to be recorded. Alter's daughter, who lived in Tel Aviv, inherited the records in 1979. The records subsequently became the property of Alter's nephew, cantor Benjamin Z. Maissner z"l, who worked as a cantor in Toronto. At first the thought was to donate the records to the Hebrew University of Jerusalem, however Maissner decided to give them to Prof. Andor Izsák, director of the European Centre for Jewish Music in Hanover. The records were supposed to "find a home where they originated from".

== Exhibitions ==
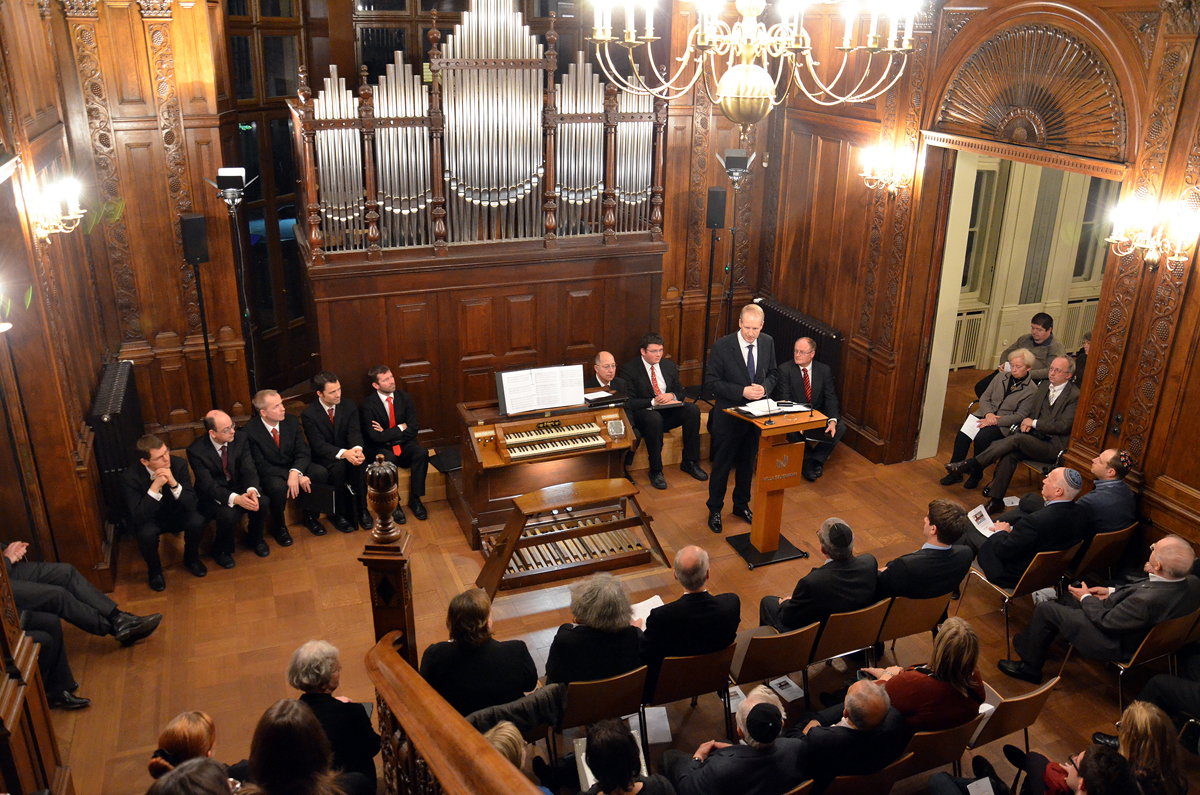
Chief Mayor of Hanover Stefan Schostok at the opening ceremony of the exhibition in 2013 at Villa Seligmann

2013 Villa Seligmann presented at the occasion of the week-long remembrance events called "Autumn days of Jewish Music 2013" the exhibition Israel Alter the last chief cantor of Hanover.

== Publications and collections ==
The European Centre for Jewish Music has produced a three part series of CDs from the original recordings of Israel Alter.

- Vol 1 Liturgical music
- Vol 2 Songs in Jiddish language
- Vol 3 Opera songs

== Literature ==
- Andor Izsák (publisher): Israel Alter-Scrapbook (English, German and Hebrew language), 1 edition 2013, Hildesheim; Georg Olms, 2013, ISBN 978-3-487-15073-4
- Simon Benne: Zentrum für jüdische Musik / Schallplatten kehren nach Hannover zurück (in German language, translated: "Jewish gramophone record are returning to Hanover"), in: Hannoversche Allgemeine Zeitung June 26, 2012, accessed December 18, 2013
- Henning Queren: Israel Alter - der Sänger aus Hannovers Synagoge / Das Europäische Zentrum für Jüdische Musik erinnert an den legendären Kantor und die Reichspogromnacht vor 75 Jahren. (in German, translated: Israel Alter- the singer of the Synagogue of Hanover / European Centre for Jewish Music remembers the legendary cantor at the commemoration occasion 75 years after Kristallnacht), in: Neue Presse (newspaper of Hanover), November 7, 2013, page 19
- Horst Weber, Stefan Drees (Ed:): Israel Alter Collection, in: Quellen zur Geschichte emigrierter Musiker. 1933 - 1950 (= Sources relating to the history of émigré musicians), 2. New York, München: Saur, 2005, ISBN 3-598-23747-2, pp. 172–174; online by Google Books
