= Dianna Boileau =

Early recipient of sex reassignment surgery

- Dianna Boileau speaking in an unaired interview for CBC television in 1972.
- Born: December 31, 1931; Winnipeg, Manitoba, U.S.
- Died: 2014 (aged 82–83)

Dianna Boileau (c. 1929 or 1930 – 2014) was a Canadian transgender woman, and among the first Canadians to undergo gender-affirming surgery. Boileau began living as a woman in her late teens. She first came to public attention after her involvement in a fatal 1962 car accident which resulted in sensational press coverage outing her as an ostensible cross-dresser. She then anonymously returned to the public eye in 1970 when she underwent gender-affirming surgery. In 1972, she published a memoir, Behold, I Am a Woman, and lived the remainder of her life in private.

== Early life ==
Boileau was born in Manitoba, in 1929 or 1930. According to her memoir, she was named Clifford by her adoptive parents. Boileau's family moved around Manitoba and Ontario for work during her childhood. During Boileau's teen years, the family resided in Fort Frances, a small town in western Ontario. During this time, a local doctor, Harold Challis, diagnosed Boileau as a transsexual, a diagnosis which she initially kept private.

At the age of 17, Boileau travelled alone on a trip to Winnipeg where she began presenting as female in public, wearing women's clothing and a blonde wig. She was picked up by the police and her parents were called. They picked her up the next day. Recalling the incident in her 1972 memoir, Boileau wrote: "The sight of me in the complete attire of a woman made Mother weep and Father fume." Boileau's parents came to accept Boileau's identity, with the encouragement of Dr. Challis, and the family moved to Thunder Bay, where Boileau began living as a woman and took the name Dianna. Boileau later lived in Calgary and Edmonton, where she worked as a model and stenographer, then moved to Toronto, working as a stenographer and legal secretary.

== 1962 car accident ==
In 1962, while living in Toronto, Boileau was driving on Highway 401 with a friend, Rosemary Sheehan, when she crashed into a guardrail. Sheehan died, and Boileau was charged with dangerous driving and criminal negligence causing death. She was initially detained in a women's lock-up, then a men's, and finally the Don Jail, a men's facility. She was put on trial in 1963, and ultimately acquitted.

The incident resulted in sensational press coverage focused on Boileau's gender, with headlines such as "Wearing dress, man remanded in car death", "Woman driver, 32, found to be male", and "Dressed as Woman, Man Goes on Trial".

The distress caused by the incident led Boileau to attempt suicide by taking pills.

== Surgical transition ==
At some point following 1962, Boileau began taking feminizing hormones and investigating gender-affirming surgery. In 1969, she and a friend underwent orchiectomies (removal of the testicles) in New York.

In 1970, Boileau underwent surgery at Toronto General Hospital to have her remaining male genitals removed and female genitals constructed. It was the first time such a surgery had been covered by the Ontario Health Insurance Plan. As a precondition, she was required to receive the endorsement of psychiatrists at the newly established gender clinic in the Clarke Institute of Psychiatry; she stayed for two weeks at the institute in the spring of 1970, undergoing medical tests and interviews.

=== Media coverage and memoir ===
Boileau's surgery was the first widely publicized gender-affirming surgery in Canada, being noted in the press, though she was not identified by name. A story in the Globe and Mail on April 23, 1970, used the headline "Identity concealed: Sex change surgery is first for Canada." This claim has been repeated widely in the media, (Note: For examples, see: "Dianna: Canada's first sex change patient". CBC. CBC Digital Archives. May 29, 1972. Archived from the original on November 30, 2021.; Chalmers-Brooks, Katie (September 2016). "Warrior of Change". UM Today. "1970: Winnipeg-born Dianna Boileau becomes Canada's first sex-change patient."; "Flashback". Journal Pioneer. 15 September 2015. "In 1970, Canada's first sex change patient, Dianna, formerly a man, told reporters[...]") and by Boileau herself in her memoir, though historians have identified other cases which may have slightly predated Boileau and the Toronto Star reported in 1967 on a surgery in Toronto.

While recovering from surgery, Boileau was approached by journalist Felicity Cochrane, who hoped to cover her story for the women's magazine Chatelaine. In the course of the interview process, the two agreed to collaborate on a book-length account of Boileau's story, for which they would split the profits. As the phenomenon of "transsexualism" was considered shocking at the time, they had difficulty finding a Canadian publisher for the book, eventually settling on the New York publisher Pyramid Books. The book, entitled Behold, I Am a Woman was published in March 1972. It was credited as being "by Dianna as told to Felicity Cochrane", and featured a photo of Boileau on the cover. The dedication reads: "To my parents and to Dr. Betty Steiner and the doctors and nursing staff of Toronto General Hospital".

In September 1970, Boileau and Cochrane embarked on a publicity tour to promote the upcoming book. In May 1972, Boileau was interviewed for a CBC Television program on women's issues, though the program never made it to air. She was interviewed in a 1973 episode of the Canadian news magazine program W5 on the topic of trans women.

== Later life ==
Shortly after the publication of her memoir, Boileau retreated from the public eye and made no further public appearances. In the 1980s, she married, taking her husband's surname. She died in 2014.

== Legacy ==
Boileau was the subject of a 12-episode podcast series, Behold Dianna, produced in 2021 by Borderland Pride, an LGBT pride organization in Rainy River, Ontario, a town where Dianna lived during part of her childhood. In 2023, she was honored with a provincial plaque at La Verendrye Hospital in Ontario, Canada.
