= Jaw reduction =

Surgical procedure

Jaw reduction or mandible angle reduction is a type of surgery to narrow the lower one-third of the face—particularly the contribution from the mandible and its muscular attachments. A square lower jaw can be considered a masculine trait, especially in Asian countries. As a result, whereas square lower jaws are often considered a positive trait in men, a wide mandible can be perceived as discordant or masculine on women, or sometimes in certain men, particularly when there is asymmetry.

== Consultation and patient evaluation ==
A facial structure with a larger mandible arch and wide zygoma is common, particularly among Asians, although it is also present in other populations. It can also be the result of certain developmental disorders such as acromegaly.

A wide lower face can primarily be caused by a wide mandibular bone or large masseter muscle. Having a wide mandibular bone requires surgical intervention to reduce the size of the bones. Atrophy of the masseter muscle can be induced with botulinum toxin injections.

Prior to selection of a treatment, the patient is examined to determine whether the wide jaw is due to the bone size, the masseter muscle or both. Three-dimensional analysis of the clinical photos, X-rays and 3D CT scans from the front, lateral, oblique, basal and overhead views are required for a detailed evaluation. The level of protrusion of the mandible angle, the size of the masseter muscle and the overall structure of the jaw are evaluated. Based on the analysis and face-to-face consultation, the surgery plan can be created to produce the desired aesthetic results.

== Surgical method ==
Surgical techniques are used to directly reduce the size of a large mandible. Depending on the candidate's individual facial structure, either mandibular resection can be performed alone or in conjunction with a sagittal mandibular reduction.

The surgery is performed under general anesthesia through tracheal intubation. The standard surgical procedure uses an intraoral approach, as it leaves no visible scars.

A guarded oscillating saw is first used to mark the proposed osteotomy line to avoid excessive resection of the mandibular bone. Following this process, the bone resection is then performed with the appropriate size of oscillating saws. Additional sagittal split ramus resection can be performed using a burr.

=== Surgery complications ===
Inferior alveolar nerve is the most important anatomic structure during mandible reduction surgery and great care should be taken to avoid injury to this nerve. Potential complications include injury to the inferior alveolar nerve which provides permanent numbness and damage to the lower lip and even death.

Another factor to consider is the mentalis muscle which elevates the lower lip and chin. During the surgery, the mentalis muscles should be carefully reattached after the mandible bone has been excised. Failure to reattach the mentalis muscles will lead to the chin and lower lip to sag, causing permanent damage.

=== Post-surgery symptoms ===
Common symptoms include haematoma, infection, asymmetry, over- or under-correction of the mandibular bone, sensory deficit. Excluding asymmetry and over- or under-correction, the other symptoms dissipate within three to six months post-surgery. Individuals with abundant soft tissue or thick skin may consider an additional lifting procedure done simultaneously with the jaw reduction surgery, as there is a high possibility of sagging soft tissue. Age and skin elasticity level also determines whether a lifting procedure is required.
