= Cephalogram =

X-ray of the craniofacial area

A cephalogram is an X-ray of the craniofacial area. A cephalometric analysis could be used as means for measuring growth in children.

The lateral cephalogram is a profile x-ray of the skull and soft tissues and is used to assess the relation of the teeth in the jaws, the relation of the jaws to the skull and the relation of the soft tissues to the teeth and jaws. In children, growth predictions can be made and we can also determine the changes that have occurred with treatment. In adults, treatment can be predicted with varying degrees of accuracy and results quantified.
