= Adam's apple =

Feature of the neck

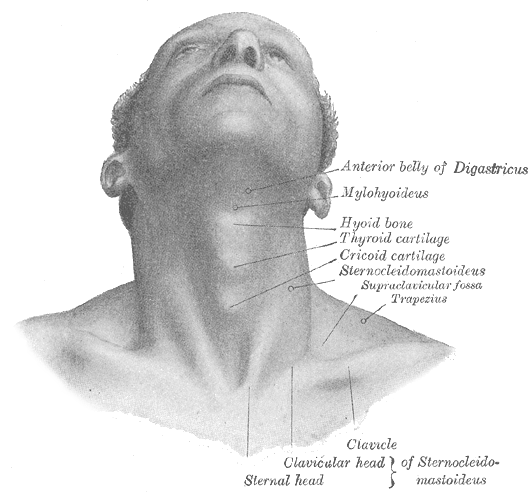
- Front view of the Adam's apple (laryngeal prominence)

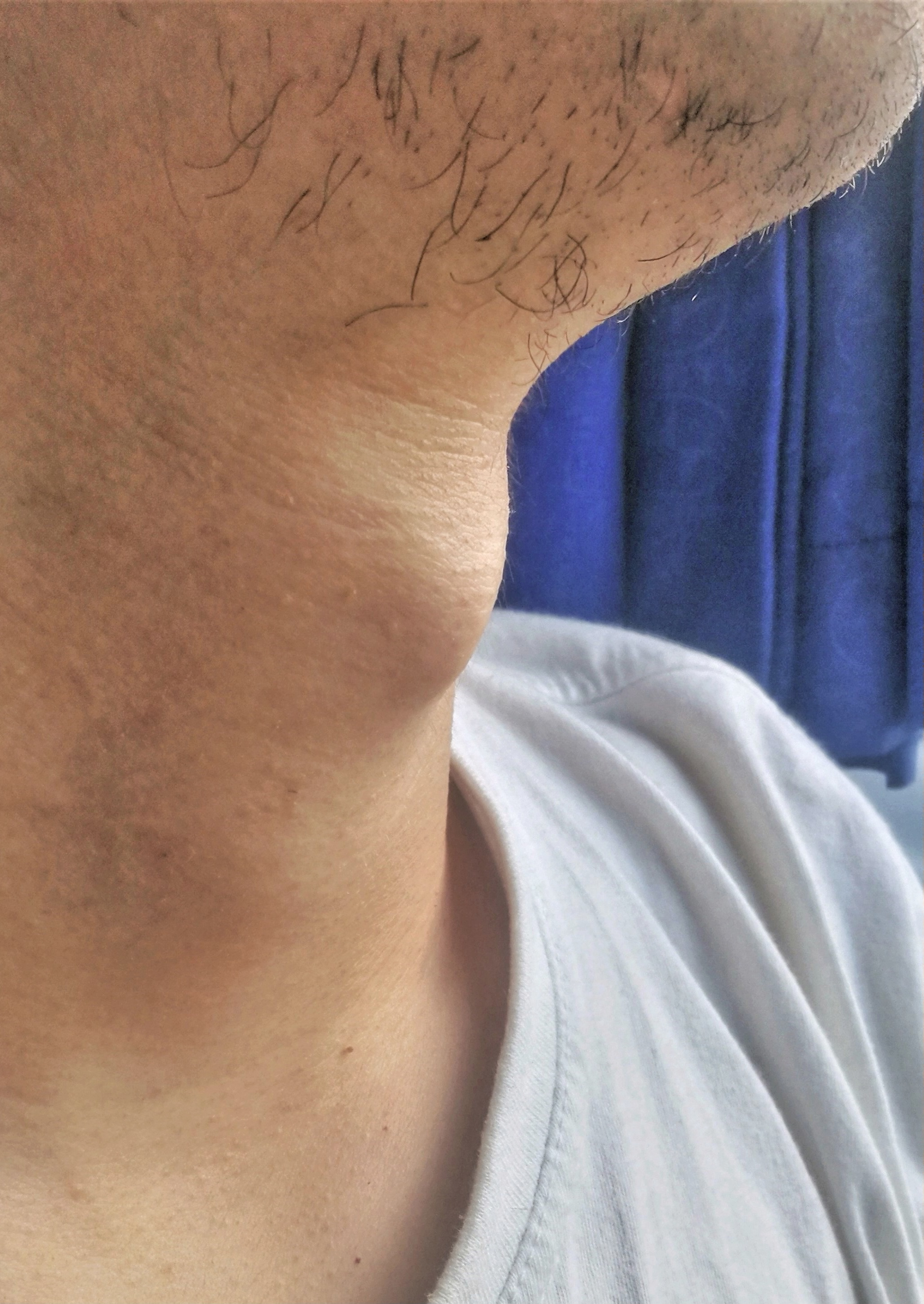
- Adam's apple on male neck (lateral view)

Details
- Precursor: Fourth and sixth pharyngeal arches

Identifiers
- Latin: prominentia laryngea
- TA98: A06.2.02.003
- TA2: 968
- FMA: 55304

The Adam's apple is the protrusion in the neck formed by the angle of the thyroid cartilage surrounding the larynx, typically visible in men and less so in women. The prominence of the Adam's apple increases in most men as a secondary sex characteristic during puberty.

== Structure ==
The topographic structure which is externally visible and colloquially called the "Adam's apple" is caused by an anatomical structure of the thyroid cartilage called the laryngeal prominence or laryngeal protuberance protruding and forming a "bump" under the skin at the front of the throat. All human beings with typical anatomy have a laryngeal protuberance of the thyroid cartilage. This prominence is typically larger and more externally noticeable in adult males. There are two reasons for this phenomenon. Firstly, the structural size of the thyroid cartilage in males tends to increase during puberty, and the laryngeal protuberance becomes more anteriorly focused. Secondly, the larynx, which the thyroid cartilage partially envelops, increases in size in male subjects during adolescence, moving the thyroid cartilage and its laryngeal protuberance towards the front of the neck. The adolescent development of both the larynx and the thyroid cartilage in males occurs as a result of hormonal changes, especially the normal increase in testosterone production in adolescent males. In females, the laryngeal protuberance sits on the upper edge of the thyroid cartilage, and the larynx tends to be smaller in size, and so the "bump" caused by protrusion of the laryngeal protuberance is much less visible or not discernible. Even so, many women display an externally visible protrusion of the thyroid cartilage, an "Adam's apple", to varying degrees which are usually minor, and this should not normally be viewed as a medical disorder.

== Function ==
The Adam's apple, in relation with the thyroid cartilage which forms it, helps protect the walls and the frontal part of the larynx, including the vocal cords (which are located directly behind it).

Another function of the Adam's apple is related to the deepening of the voice. During adolescence, the thyroid cartilage grows together with the larynx. Consequently, the laryngeal prominence grows in size, mainly in men. Together, a larger soundboard is made up in phonation apparatus and, as a result, men get a deeper voice note.

== Society and Western culture ==
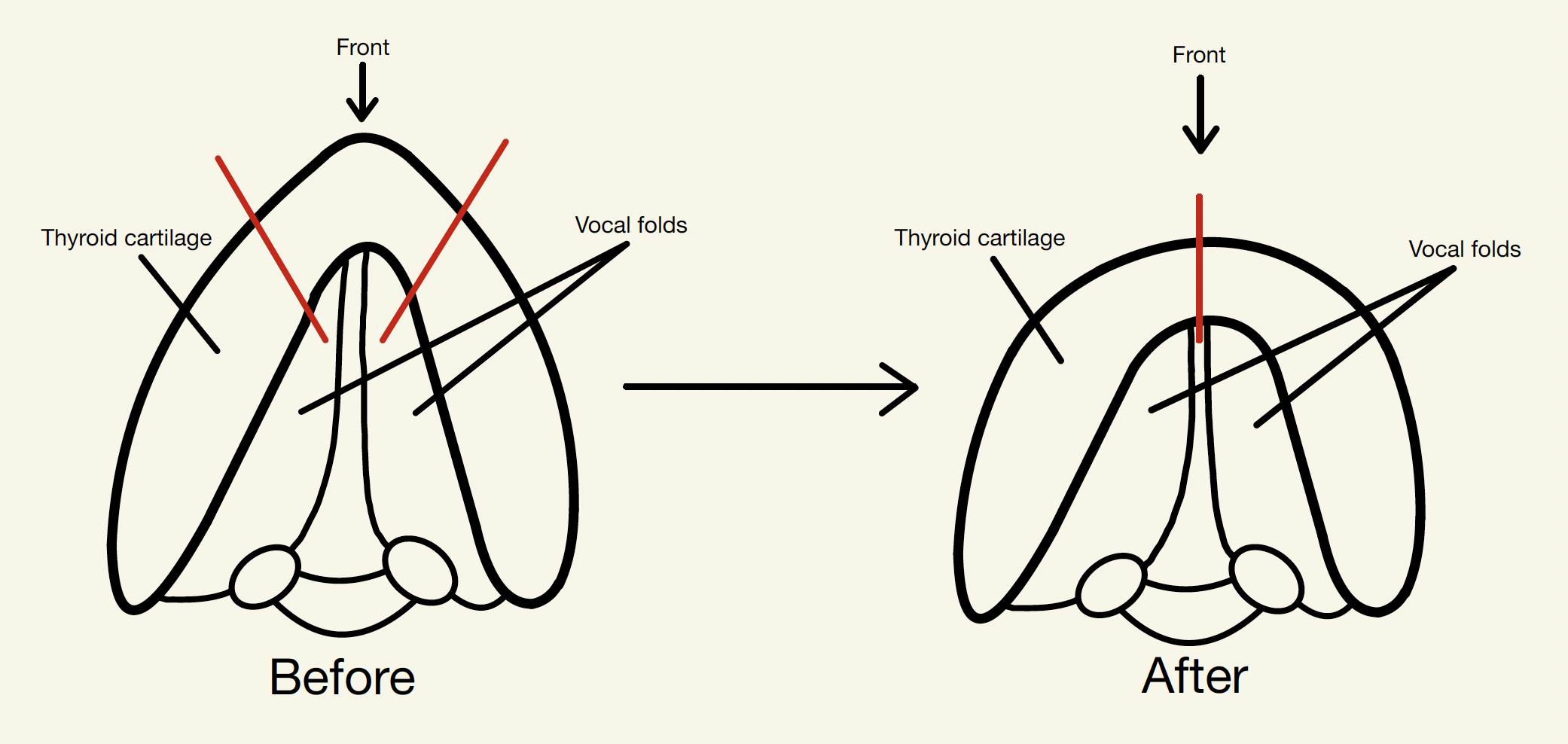
A diagram demonstrating a general outline of the feminization laryngoplasty (FemLar) surgical technique using a top-down horizontal cross section of the larynx. The area labeled "front" in each image is the Adam's Apple/Laryngeal Prominence. In a tracheal shave, superficial tissue at the front of the larynx is dissected and the general shape of the larynx's interior, along with the underlying vocal cords, are otherwise unaffected. In feminization laryngoplasty, the Adam's Apple is moved back even further by modifying the underlying vocal cords as well, and the voice and interior of the larynx are also affected.

While both men and women can possess an Adam's apple, the larger frequency of its appearance in men has led to the perception of the Adam's apple as an indicator of masculinity. Thus, transgender women may choose to undergo cosmetic surgery to remove it from their necks, a process known as chondrolaryngoplasty, or colloquially as a "tracheal shave". Transgender men may choose to augment and thereby enlarge the Adam's apple, a process known as masculinization. Exogenous testosterone can also create a more prominent larynx along with significant pitch lowering, which is a much more common intervention for trans men than surgery.

Chondrolaryngoplasty surgery is effective, and studies done by surgeons in Tel Aviv and Los Angeles have demonstrated complications to be few and, if present, transient.

There is also an additional surgery available, feminization laryngoplasty, also known as "FemLar", which can safely reduce the Adam’s Apple to an extent greater than that which can be accomplished by a tracheal shave, given it explicitly operates on the vocal cords within the Adam's apple as opposed to avoiding them. However, feminization laryngoplasty is a reconstructive surgery that carries additional risks and has a very strong feminizing effect on the voice that may or may not be desirable to the patient. There are also far fewer practitioners who are known to be currently performing FemLar as it is far newer than the tracheal shave procedure.

== Etymology ==
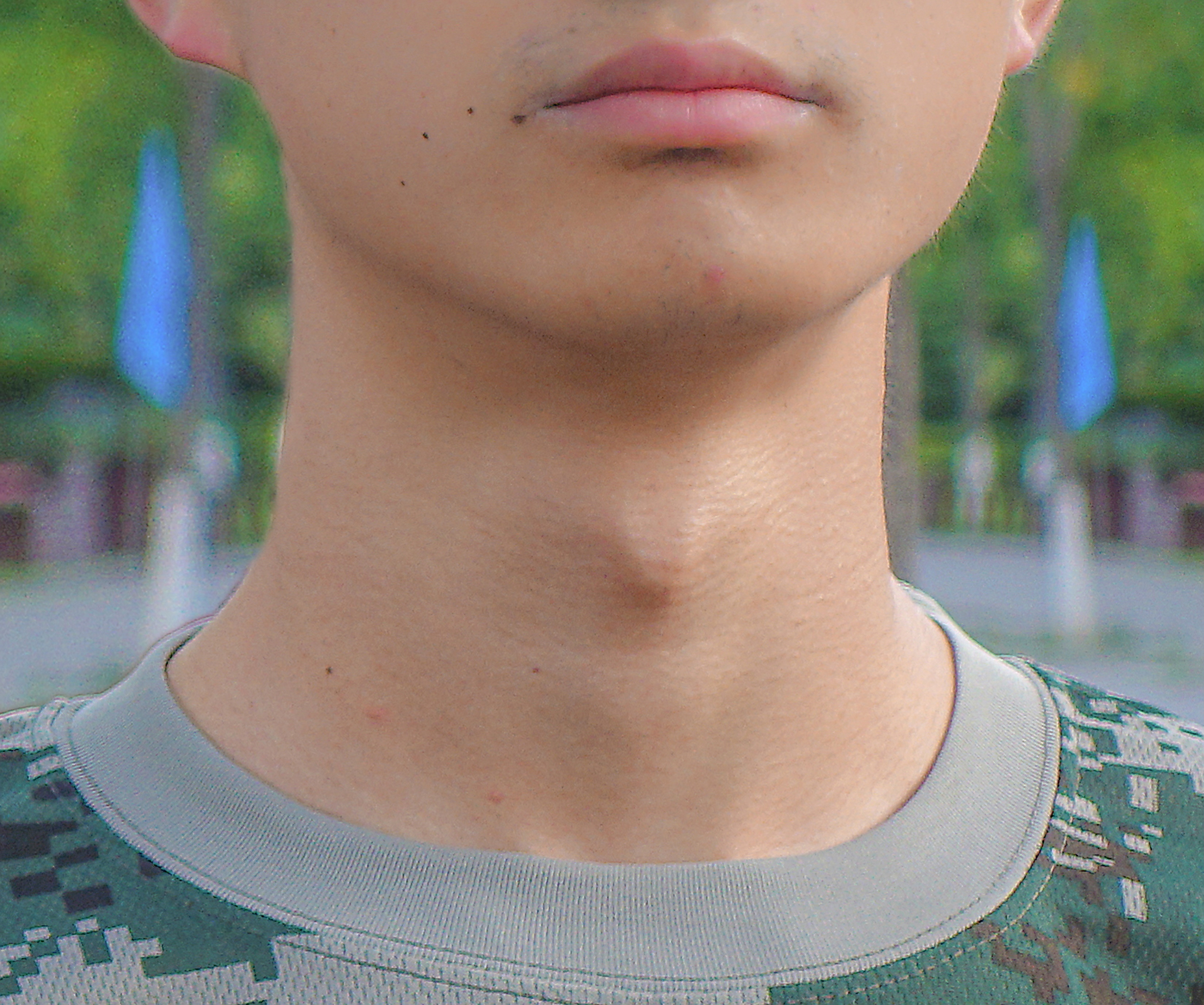
An example of male laryngeal prominence (front view)

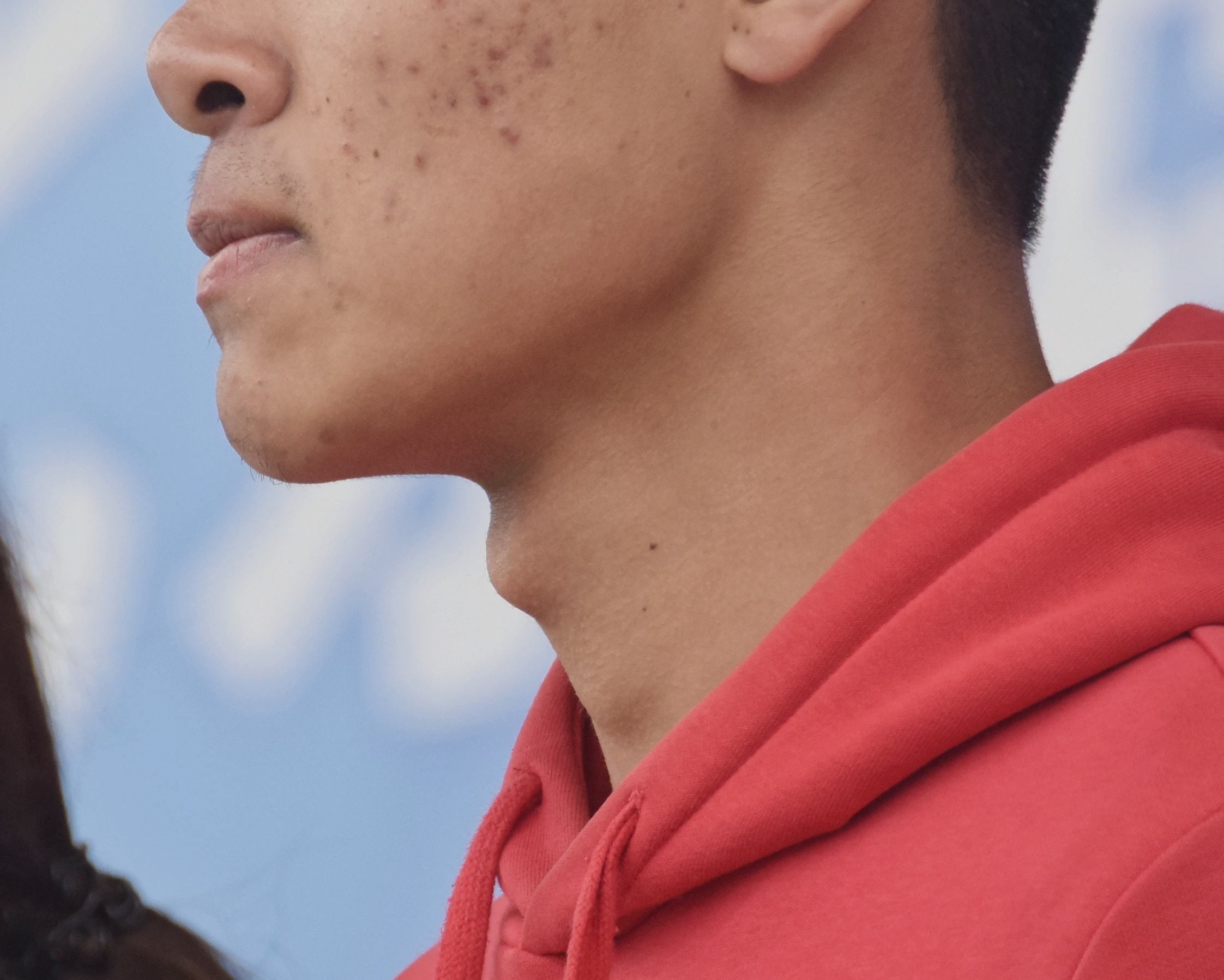
An example of male laryngeal prominence (side view)

The English term "Adam's apple" is a calque of Latin pomum Adami, which is found in European medical texts from as early as 1600. "Adam's Apple" is found in a 1662 English translation of Thomas Bartholin's 1651 work Anatomia.

The 1662 citation includes an explanation for the origin of the phrase: a piece of forbidden fruit was supposedly embedded in the throat of Adam, who according to the Abrahamic religions was the first man:

the common people have a belief, that by the judgment of God, a part of that fatal Apple, abode sticking in Adams Throat, and is so communicated to his posterity

This etymology is also proposed by Brewer's Dictionary of Phrase and Fable and the 1913 edition of Webster's Dictionary. The story is not found in the Bible or other Jewish, Christian, or Islamic writings.

Linguist Alexander Gode proposed in 1968 that the Latin phrase pomum Adami (literally: 'Adam's apple') was a mistranslation of the Hebrew "tappuach ha adam", meaning "male bump". The confusion was supposedly due to the fact that in the Hebrew language the proper name "Adam" (אדם) literally means "man", and the word for "apple", "tapuach", is similar to the word "tafuach" which means "swollen", thus in combination: the swelling of a man.

The medical term "prominentia laryngea" (laryngeal prominence) was introduced by the Basle Nomina Anatomica in 1895.

In the American South, "goozle" is used colloquially to describe the laryngeal prominence, likely derived from guzzle.

== Laryngeal prominence anatomy ==
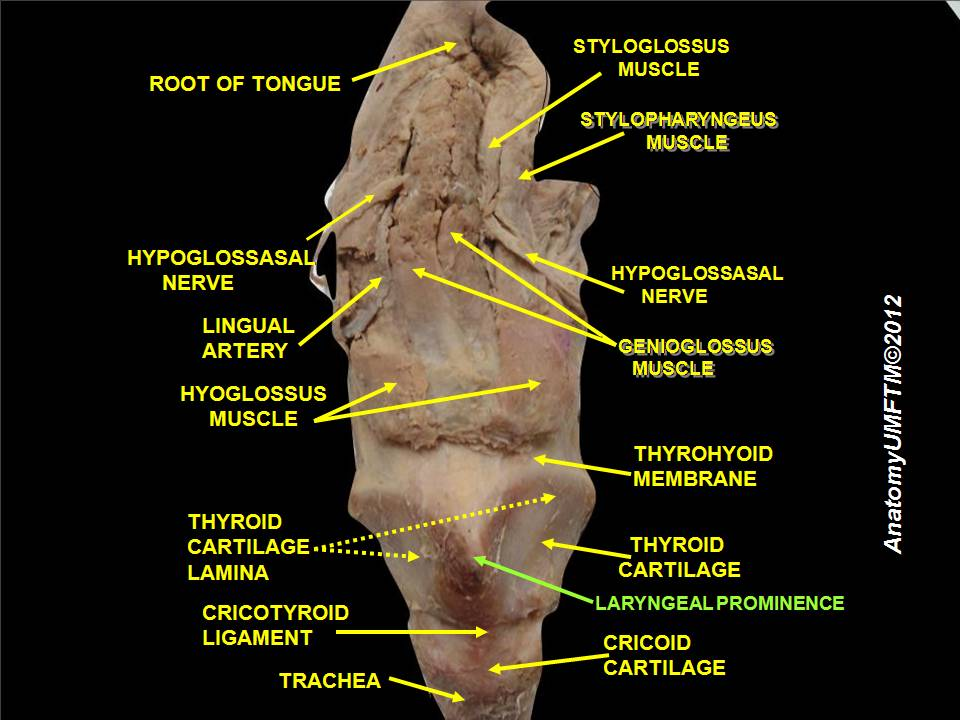

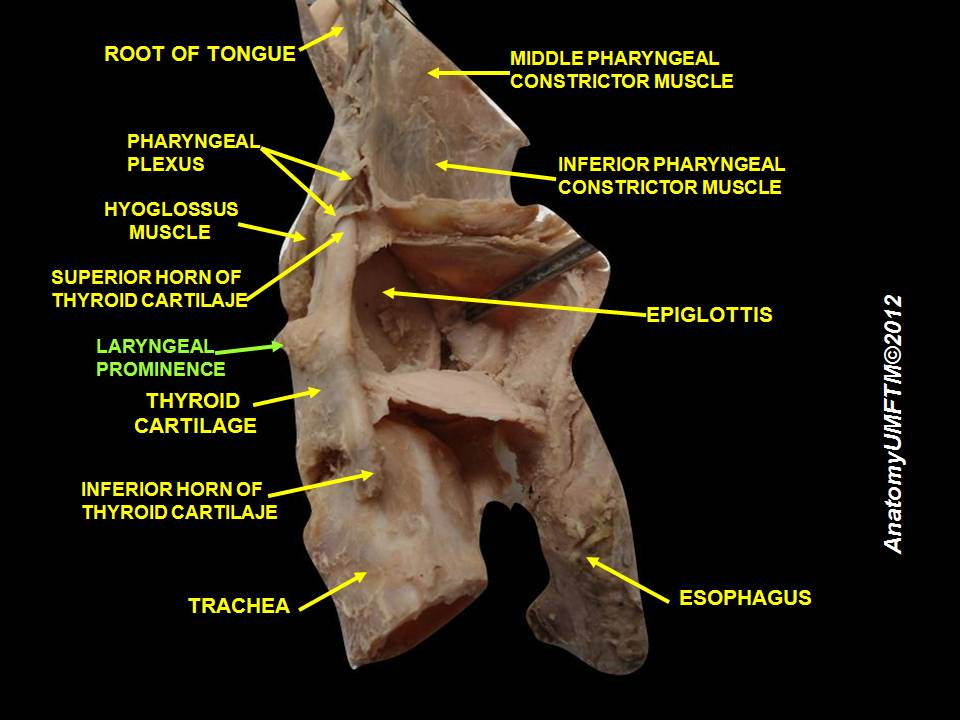

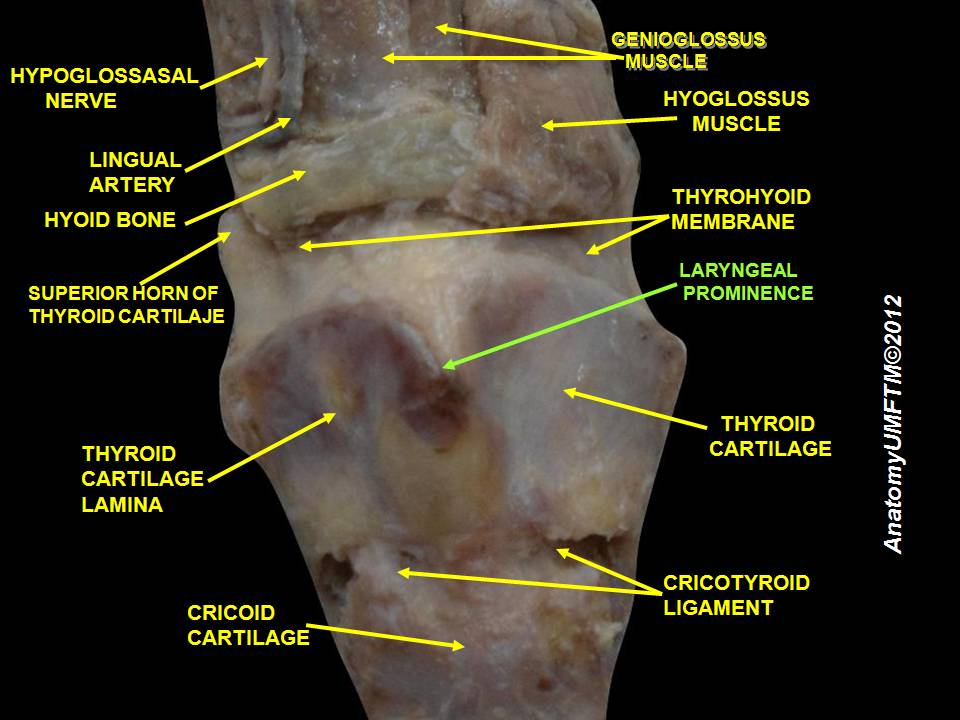

== See also ==
- Hyoid bone
