= Outline of transgender topics =

The following outline is provided as an overview of and topical guide to transgender topics.

The term "transgender" is multi-faceted and complex, especially where consensual and precise definitions have not yet been reached. While often the best way to find out how people identify themselves is to ask them, not all persons who might be thought of as falling under the transgender 'umbrella' identify as such. Transgender can also be distinguished from intersex, a term for people born with sex characteristics "that do not fit typical binary notions of male or female bodies".

Books and articles written about transgender people or culture are often outdated by the time they are published, if not already outdated at the time of composition, due to inappropriate and/or outdated questions or premises. Psychology, medicine, and social sciences research, aid, or otherwise interact with or study transgender people. Each field starts from a different point of view, offers different perspectives, and uses different nomenclature. This difference is mirrored by the attitude of transgender people regarding transgender issues, which can be seen in the articles listed below.

== People and behaviour ==
- Transgender
  - Trans man
  - Trans woman
  - Transgender youth
  - List of transgender people
- Transsexual
- Non-binary
  - Genderqueer
  - List of people with non-binary gender identities
  - Genderfluidity
- Gender neutrality
- Androgyny
- Gender bender
- Gender variance
- Packing (phallus)
- Tucking
- Chest binding
- Breast prostheses
- Shemale
- Third gender
- Transsexual pornography

=== Other gender non-conforming behaviour ===
- Cross-dressing
- Drag
  - Drag queen
  - Drag king
  - AFAB queen
  - Travesti
  - Pantomime dame
- Feminization (sexual activity)
- Transvestic fetishism

=== In non-Western cultures ===
- Akava'ine (Cook Islands)
- Bakla (Philippines)
- Bissu (Indonesia)
- Calabai (Indonesia)
- Eunuch
- Fakaleitī (Tonga)
- Faʻafafine (Samoa)
- Faʻatama (Samoa)
- Femminiello (Neapolitan)
- Galli (ancient Rome)
- Hijra (South Asia)
- Kathoey (Thailand)
- Khanith (Arabia)
- Khawal (Egypt)
- Koekchuch (Siberia)
- Köçek (Turkey)
- Māhū (Hawaii)
- Mak nyah (Malaysia)
- Meti (Nepal)
- Mudoko dako (Langi and Uganda)
- Mukhannath (Arabia)
- Muxe (Mexico)
- Newhalf ("ニューハーフ") (Japan)
- Toms and dees (Thailand)
- Balkan sworn virgins (Balkan)
- Takatāpui (Māori)
- Travesti (Brazil)
- Two-spirit (Native American)
- Waria (Indonesia)
- Winkte (Lakota)

== Basic terms ==
- Gender modality
- Sex–gender distinction
- Gender
- Agender
- Transfeminine
- Transmasculine
- Bigender
- Cisgender
- Gender binary
- Gender-blind
- Gender identity
  - Gender dysphoria
  - Gender euphoria
- Gender role
  - Real-life experience
- Non-binary
- Pangender
- Terminology of transgender anatomy
- Third gender

=== Sex ===
- Sex assignment
  - Assigned female at birth
  - Assigned male at birth
- Sexual characteristics
  - Sex organ or primary sexual characteristics
  - Secondary sex characteristics
- Sex-determination system
- Intersex
  - Disorders of sex development
  - Hermaphrodite
- Endosex

=== Sexual orientation and behaviour ===
Sexual orientation and behaviour are independent from gender identity; since both are often mentioned together or even confused, some relevant topics are mentioned here. The first article elaborates on this question.

- Sexual orientation
- Transgender sexuality
  - Androphilia and gynephilia
- LGBTQ culture - also contains a section on transgender people
- Sexuality and gender identity-based cultures
- Sexual identity
- LGBTQ
  - Gay
  - Lesbian
  - Bisexuality
  - Pansexuality
  - Asexuality
  - Queer
- Heterosexuality

=== Other ===
- Heteronormativity
- Cisnormativity
- Amatonormativity
- Allonormativity
- Transgender Day of Remembrance
- International Transgender Day of Visibility
- Transphobia
- Trans panic defense

== Law and rights ==
- Legal status of transgender people
  - Legal recognition of non-binary gender
  - Legal status of gender-affirming healthcare
  - Name change
- List of transgender-rights organizations
- List of transgender political office-holders
  - List of transgender politicians in Australia
  - List of transgender public officeholders in the United States
- Yogyakarta Principles
- Transgender history

=== By country ===
- Argentina
  - Transgender rights in Argentina
- Australia
  - List of transgender politicians in Australia
  - Transgender rights in Australia
  - Re Kevin
- Brazil
  - Transgender rights in Brazil
    - ADPF 787
  - Transgender history in Brazil
- Canada
  - An Act to amend the Canadian Human Rights Act and the Criminal Code
  - Transgender rights in Canada
- China
  - Transgender people in China
- Finland
  - Transgender history in Finland
- Germany
  - Transgender rights in Germany
  - Transgender people in Nazi Germany
- India
  - Rights of Transgender Persons Bill, 2014
  - LGBTQ rights in Tamil Nadu
- Iran
  - Transgender rights in Iran
- Ireland
  - Transgender rights in the Republic of Ireland
- New Zealand
  - Transgender rights in New Zealand
- Singapore
  - Transgender people in Singapore
- South Africa
  - Alteration of Sex Description and Sex Status Act, 2003
- South Korea
  - Transgender people in South Korea
- Turkey
  - March against Homophobia and Transphobia
- United Kingdom
  - Anti-transgender movement in the United Kingdom
  - Transgender rights in the United Kingdom
  - Gender Recognition Act 2004
  - Gender Recognition Panel
- United States
  - Compton's Cafeteria riot
  - Gender identity under Title IX
  - Transgender history in the United States
  - Transgender personnel in the United States military
  - List of transgender public officeholders in the United States
  - Transgender disenfranchisement in the United States
  - Transgender legal history in the United States
  - Transgender rights in the United States
  - Transphobia in the United States
  - Persecution of transgender people under the second Trump administration

=== Discrimination ===
- Anti-gender movement
  - United Kingdom
- Bathroom bill
- Deadnaming
- Discrimination against non-binary people
- Discrimination against transgender men
- History of violence against LGBT people in the United States
- List of people killed for being transgender
- Gender-critical feminism (also referred to as trans-exclusionary radical feminism)
  - TERF (acronym)
- Transgender genocide
- Transgender inequality
- Transmisogyny
- Transphobia
- Violence against transgender people

== Medicine ==
- Gender dysphoria
- Gender dysphoria in children
- Sexual relationship disorder
- Sexual maturation disorder
- Ego-dystonic sexual orientation
- Body integrity dysphoria
- World Professional Association for Transgender Health
  - Standards of Care for the Health of Transgender and Gender Diverse People
- Transgender health care
  - Transgender health care misinformation
  - Puberty blocker
  - Transgender voice therapy
  - Gender-affirming hormone therapy
    - Feminizing hormone therapy
    - Masculinizing hormone therapy
  - Gender-affirming surgery
    - Feminizing surgery
      - Breast augmentation
      - Orchiectomy
      - Trachea shave
      - Vulvoplasty
      - Vaginoplasty
      - Transgender voice therapy
    - Masculinizing surgery
      - Chest reconstruction (Also known as top surgery)
      - Facial masculinization surgery
      - Phalloplasty
      - Metoidioplasty
      - Scrotoplasty

== Classification and causes ==
- Causes of gender incongruence
- Classification of transgender people

== Sexual diversity studies ==
- Anima and animus
- Feminism
  - Transfeminism
  - Feminist views on transgender topics
- Gender studies
- Queer studies
- Queer theory

=== Scholars ===
- Judith Butler
- Leslie Feinberg
- Eve Kosofsky Sedgwick
- Susan Stryker

== Social transition ==
- Closeted
- Coming out
- Detransition
- Rapid-onset gender dysphoria controversy
- Passing (gender)
- Questioning (sexuality and gender)
- Gender transition

== Society ==
=== Art ===
Transgender art and artists include:

- Transgender literature
- New Media Art:
  - Sandy Stone – ACT Lab
  - Shu Lea Cheang – Brandon
- Performance:
  - S. Bear Bergman
  - Kate Bornstein
  - Micha Cárdenas
  - Willi Pape
- Music:
  - LGBTQ representation in hip hop music
  - Butterfly Music Transgender Chorus
  - Genesis P-Orridge
  - Ryan Cassata
  - Laura Jane Grace
  - Sophie
  - Cavetown
  - List of transgender women musicians
- Photography:
  - Claude Cahun
  - Loren Cameron
  - Yishay Garbasz
- Film:
  - Barbara Hammer

=== Media ===
- List of transgender publications
- Media portrayals of transgender people

==== Film and television ====
- List of feature films with transgender characters
- Cross-dressing in film and television

==== Comics ====
- Assigned Male
- Claudine
- Wandering Son
- Rain

==== Books ====
- Herma by MacDonald Harris (ISBN 0-689-11179-7) the tale of a hermaphrodite as the central character, who is transformed from an opera singer (female) to an aviator (male) at the turn of the 20th century into World War One.
- Last Exit to Brooklyn by Hubert Selby Jr. one of the stories revolve around a group of transvestites, led by a girl named Georgette.
- Masculinities Without Men? (ISBN 0-7748-0997-3) by Jean Bobby Noble
- Armistead Maupin's Tales of the City series includes a transgender person as a central character.
- Luna (ISBN 0-316-73369-5) by Julie Anne Peters
- Whipping Girl by Julia Serano
- Becoming, a gender flip book (ISBN 1935613006) by Yishay Garbasz a flip book with images of the artist one year before and one year after her gender affirmation surgery.

=== Sport ===
- Transgender people in sports
  - Transgender people in ice hockey
- Sex verification in sports

=== Religion ===
- Transgender people and religion
  - Christianity and transgender people

== Military service ==
- Transgender people and military service
- Transgender personnel in the South Korean military
- Transgender personnel in the United States military

== Gender-variant people or behaviour ==
Many other terms describe gender-variant people or behaviour, without the people being described necessarily being transgender:

- Amazons
- Butch and femme
- Effeminacy
- Tomboy
- Femboy

=== Religion ===
- The cult of Aphroditus, the androgynous Amathusian Aphrodite in Greek mythology.
- Galli, the transgender priests of the Phrygian goddess Cybele and her consort Attis.
- The Sisters of Perpetual Indulgence, a group of mostly gay male nuns who take vows to promulgate universal joy and expiate stigmatic guilt.
- Skoptsy, religious sect in early 20th Century imperial Russia that practiced castration and mastectomies.

== Miscellaneous ==
- Homelessness among LGBTQ youth in the United States
- International Day Against Homophobia, Biphobia and Transphobia
- Stonewall riots
- Transgender flag
- LGBTQ people in prison
- Neuroqueer theory
- Social construction of gender
