= Transgender legal history in the United States =

The legal and regulatory history of transgender people in the United States begins in the 1960s. Such legislation covers federal, state, municipal, and local levels, as well as military justice. It reflects broader societal attitudes which have shifted significantly over time and have impacted legislative and judicial outcomes.

Legal cases concerning LGBT issues were first raised in the United States in the 1960s. These initial cases often revolved around the ability to change names or sex on legal documents and sought protection against various forms of discrimination—such as in employment, civil rights violations, and equal protection under the law. Over the decades, these issues expanded to include a broader array of concerns such as Medicare and Social Security benefits, transition-related healthcare rights in the workplace, marital rights, military service conditions, medical malpractice, restroom access, and housing discrimination.

== 1960s ==
In 1966 the first case to consider transsexualism in the US was heard, Mtr. of Anonymous v. Weiner, 50 Misc. 2d 380, 270 N.Y.S.2d 319 (1966). The case concerned a transsexual person from New York City who had undergone sex reassignment surgery and wanted a change of name and sex on their birth certificate. The New York City Health Department refused to grant the request, and the court ruled that the New York City and New Jersey Health Code only permitted a change of sex on the birth certificate if an error was made recording it at birth, so the Health Department acted correctly. The decision of the court in Weiner was affirmed in Mtr. of Hartin v. Dir. of Bur. of Recs., 75 Misc. 2d 229, 232, 347 N.Y.S.2d 515 (1973) and Anonymous v. Mellon, 91 Misc. 2d 375, 383, 398 N.Y.S.2d 99 (1977).

In 1968 a transgender person again sought a change of name and sex on their birth certificate in the case of Matter of Anonymous, 57 Misc. 2d 813, 293 N.Y.S.2d 834 (1968). The change of sex was denied, but the name change was granted. The same occurred in the case of Matter of Anonymous, 64 Misc. 2d 309, 314 N.Y.S.2d 668 (1970).

== 1970s ==
Animation: US LGBT anti-discrimination laws/regulations, 1972-2011

In 1971, Bernardsville, New Jersey junior high music teacher Paula Grossman was fired from her position of 14 years after openly transitioning and announcing her identity as a woman. She appealed to the U.S. Supreme Court, which in 1976 refused to hear the case.

A few other scattered positive developments also occurred in this period. In 1975 Minneapolis became the first city in the United States to pass trans-inclusive civil rights protection legislation. In 1977 Renée Richards, a transsexual woman, was granted entry to the U.S. Open (in tennis) after a ruling in her favor by the New York Supreme Court. This was considered a landmark decision in favor of transgender rights.

Other legal cases continued to consider the issue of changing the gender marker on one's official documentation, but cases in this period also considered other issues of anti-transgender discrimination. In 1975 in the case of Darnell v. Lloyd, 395 F. Supp. 1210 (D. Conn. 1975), a Connecticut court found that substantial state interest must be demonstrated to justify refusing to grant a change in sex recorded on a birth certificate. However, in 1977, in the case K. v. Health Division, 277 Or. 371, 560 P.2d 1070 (1977), the Oregon Supreme Court rejected an application for a change of name or sex on the birth certificate of a post-operative transsexual, on the grounds that there was no legislative authority for such a change to be made.

In 1976 the first case in the United States that found post-operative transsexuals could marry in their post-operative sex was decided. In the New Jersey case M.T. v. J.T., 140 N.J. Super. 77, 355 A.2d 204, cert. denied 71 N.J. 345 (1976), the court expressly considered the English Corbett v. Corbett decision that disallowed such a marriage, but rejected its reasoning.

Also in 1976, the New Jersey Supreme Court rejected the appeal of a transgender plaintiff, Paula Grossman, in a sex discrimination case involving termination from her teaching job after sex reassignment surgery. Another sex discrimination case in 1984, Ulane v. Eastern Airlines Inc. 742 F.2d 1081 (7th Cir. 1984), concerned Karen Ulane, a transsexual pilot. The Seventh Circuit denied her Title VII (of the Civil Rights Act of 1964) sex discrimination protection by narrowly interpreting "sex" discrimination as discrimination "against women", and denying Ulane's womanhood.

Mary Elizabeth Clark served as a United States Navy chief petty officer (E-7), serving as an instructor in anti-submarine warfare, before she underwent sex reassignment surgery; knowing of her past, a U.S. Army Reserves recruiter signed her up for the Army, which she joined in 1976. A year-and-a-half later she was discharged from the Army when her history became known to higher-ups. She brought suit against the Army and won a settlement of $25,000 and an honorable discharge.

== 1990s ==
=== Violence against transgender people and their partners ===
In 1993 Brandon Teena, a transgender man, was raped and murdered in Nebraska. In 1999 he became the subject of a biopic entitled Boys Don't Cry, starring Hilary Swank as Brandon Teena, for which Swank won an Academy Award.

In 1995 in Washington, D.C., Tyra Hunter, a transgender woman, died after being denied medical care by ER staff due to her gender identity. In 1998 her mother was awarded $2.8 million after the District of Columbia was found guilty of negligence and malpractice in Tyra's death. The Chicago area organization T.Y.R.A. (Transgender Youth Resources and Advocacy) was created in her memory.

In 1999 Calpernia Addams, a transgender woman, began dating PFC Barry Winchell. Word of the relationship spread at Winchell's Army base, where he was harassed by fellow soldiers and ultimately murdered. Winchell's murder and the subsequent trial resulted in widespread press coverage and a formal review of the US "Don't Ask, Don't Tell" (DADT) military policy, ordered by President Bill Clinton. The case became a prominent example used to illustrate the failure of Don't Ask, Don't Tell to protect LGBT service members. Addams' and Winchell's romance and the crimes of their abusers are depicted in the film Soldier's Girl, released in 2003. A subsequent New York Times article, "An Inconvenient Woman", documented the marginalization and misrepresentation of transgender sexuality even by gay rights activists.

== 2000s ==
In the 2004 case Smith v. City of Salem 378 F.3d 566, 568 (6th Cir. 2004) Smith, a transgender woman, filed Title VII (of the Civil Rights Act of 1964) claims of sex discrimination and retaliation, equal protection and due process claims under 42 U.S.C. § 1983, and state law claims of invasion of privacy and civil conspiracy. On appeal, the Price Waterhouse precedent was applied: "[i]t follows that employers who discriminate against men because they do wear dresses and makeup, or otherwise act femininely, are also engaging in sex discrimination, because the discrimination would not occur but for the victim's sex". This was considered a significant victory for transgender people, as the case reiterated that discrimination based on both sex and gender expression is forbidden under Title VII (of the Civil Rights Act of 1964), opening the door for more expansive jurisprudence on transgender issues in the future. This case did not, however, eliminate workplace dress codes, which frequently have separate rules based solely on gender.

In 2005 Izza Lopez was denied a job for "misrepresenting" her gender. A subsequent lawsuit, Lopez v. River Oaks Imaging & Diagnostic Group, Inc., established there was discrimination under Title VII of the Civil Rights Act of 1964.

In 2008 the District Court of DC ruled in favor of Diane Schroer, who was denied a position as a terrorism research analyst at the Library of Congress after revealing that she would be transitioning from male to female. The Court agreed that Shroer's case fell under sex discrimination regulations.

Also in 2008 the first ever U.S. Congressional hearing on discrimination against transgender people in the workplace was held by the House Subcommittee on Health, Employment, Labor, and Pensions.

In 2009, due to the Matthew Shepard and James Byrd, Jr. Hate Crimes Prevention Act being signed into law, the definition of a federal hate crime was expanded to include those violent crimes in which the victim is selected due to their actual or perceived gender or gender identity. Previously, federal hate crimes were defined as only those violent crimes where the victim is selected due to their race, color, religion, or national origin.

== 2010s ==
=== Case law ===
O'Donnabhain v. Commissioner 134 T.C. No. 4 is a case decided by the United States Tax Court in 2010. The issue for the court was whether a taxpayer who has been diagnosed with gender identity disorder can deduct sex reassignment surgery costs as necessary medical expenses under 26 U.S.C. § 213. The Internal Revenue Service (IRS) argued that such surgery is cosmetic and not medically necessary. On February 2, 2010, the court ruled that O'Donnabhain should be allowed to deduct the costs of her treatment for gender-identity disorder, including sex-reassignment surgery and hormone treatments. In its decision, the court found the IRS position was "at best a superficial characterization of the circumstances" that is "thoroughly rebutted by the medical evidence".

In 2011 Vandy Beth Glenn, a transgender woman, won a lawsuit against then-Legislative Counsel Sewell Brumby. Brumby fired Glenn in 2007 for deciding to transition genders on the job, and a three-judge panel of the 11th Circuit Court of Appeals upheld a lower court's ruling that Brumby had wrongly fired Glenn.

Also in 2012, Beth Scott, a transgender woman from New Jersey, successfully appealed Aetna's decision not to cover her mammogram because she is transgender. Aetna eventually paid the cost of her mammogram and agreed to ensure that transgender people can access all necessary sex-specific care, such as prostate exams and gynecological care, regardless of whether they are categorized as male or female in insurance records.

=== Governmental ===
==== Executive action and regulatory ====
In 2010 the Obama administration explicitly banned gender identity-based discrimination on the federal jobs web site USAJobs.

Also in 2014, President Obama signed Executive Order 13672, adding "gender identity" to the categories protected against discrimination in hiring in the federal civilian workforce and both "gender identity" and "sexual orientation" to the categories protected against discrimination in employment and hiring on the part of federal government contractors and sub-contractors.

Also in 2014, Attorney General Eric Holder stated that the Justice Department's position going forward in litigation would be that discrimination against transgender people is covered under the sex discrimination prohibition in Title VII of the Civil Rights Act of 1964.

Also in 2014, the U.S. Office of Personnel Management announced an end to the ban on transition-related healthcare in Federal Employee Health Benefits plans (FEHB). This decision did not mean FEHB insurance providers were required to cover transition-related healthcare, only that they could if they wanted. But in 2015, it was announced that effective January 1, 2016, insurance companies that participate in the Federal Employees Health Benefits Program must include transition-related coverage.

Also in 2016, new regulations were published stating that any health care provider or health insurance company that receives federal funds, as well as state Medicaid agencies and Obamacare health insurance exchange marketplaces, must give transgender people equal treatment, and transgender people have the right to make civil rights claims if such entities deny them coverage or necessary care because they are transgender.

In May 2016, the Obama administration issued guidance that directed public schools to let transgender students use bathrooms and locker rooms matching their gender identity, and to use the student's preferred name and pronouns. However, later that year, in August, Texas federal judge Reed O'Connor issued a nationwide injunction forbidding federal government agencies from taking any action against school districts which failed to follow the Obama administration's guidance on transgender bathroom and locker room policies in schools. As well, in 2017 the Trump administration overturned the Obama administration's guidance. Also in 2017, the Education Department gave a memo to staff declaring that the lawyers of the Office for Civil Rights must consider the discrimination complaints of transgender students on a case-by-case basis, and that that office cannot rely on the Obama administration's guidance in determining how to answer complaints by transgender students.

In 2016, and again in 2017 after the prior bill had died in committee, Rep. Pete Olson [R-TX] introduced federal legislation which would limit gender identity to biological assignation, which would remove the ability to apply federal civil rights protections to transgender individuals. Olson stated in a press release that "the Obama Administration strongly overreached by unilaterally redefining the definition of 'sex' with respect to the Civil Rights Act outside of the lawmaking process."

==== Federal Agency ====
In 2010 the State Department amended its policy to allow permanent gender marker changes on passports where a physician states that "the applicant has had appropriate clinical treatment for gender transition to the new gender". The previous policy required a statement from a surgeon that gender reassignment surgery was completed.

In 2011 the Social Security Administration (SSA) ended the practice of allowing gender to be matched in its Social Security Number Verification System (SSNVS). Therefore, the Social Security Administration no longer sends notifications that alert employers when the gender marker on an employee's W-2 does not match Social Security records, a practice that "outed" some transgender Americans in the past.

In 2012 the Equal Employment Opportunity Commission (EEOC) expanded upon these individual court cases by ruling that Title VII (of the Civil Rights Act of 1964) does prohibit gender identity-based employment discrimination as sex discrimination. The Equal Employment Opportunity Commission declared, "intentional discrimination against a transgender individual because that person is transgender is, by definition, discrimination 'based on ... sex' and such discrimination ... violates Title VII". This ruling was for a discrimination complaint filed by the Transgender Law Center on behalf of transgender woman Mia Macy, who had been denied a job due to her gender identity. The ruling opens the door for any transgender employees or potential employees who have been discriminated against by a business hiring 15 or more people in the US based on their gender identity to file a claim with the EEOC for sex discrimination.

In 2012 the Veterans Health Administration declared that transgender veterans are able to change the gender marker on their medical records by providing a physician's letter confirming gender reassignment.

In 2012, the Department of Health and Human Services (HHS) announced that the Patient Protection and Affordable Care Act's ban on sex-based discrimination, which will take effect by January 2014, "extends to claims of discrimination based on gender identity or failure to conform to stereotypical notions of masculinity and femininity."

In 2013 the EEOC ruled in favor of an openly transgender woman who was subjected to physical and verbal harassment at her job with a federal contractor in Maryland. This, according to the LGBT rights organization Freedom to Work, is the first time in history that the EEOC has investigated allegations of anti-transgender harassment and ruled for the transgender employee.

In 2013 the Social Security Administration (SSA) removed its requirement that transgender people wanting to amend their gender on a Social Security card provide proof of gender reassignment surgery, instead stating that they must provide a passport or birth certificate reflecting their accurate gender, or a certification from a physician confirming that the individual has had appropriate clinical treatment for gender transition.

Also in 2014, guidelines were issued by the U.S. Department of Education stating that transgender students are protected from sex-based discrimination under Title IX, and instructing public schools to treat transgender students consistent with their gender identity in single-sex classes, so that a student who identifies as a transgender boy is allowed entry to a boys-only class, and a student who identifies as a transgender girl is allowed entry to a girls-only class. The memo states in part that "[a]ll students, including transgender students and students who do not conform to sex stereotypes, are protected from sex-based discrimination under Title IX. Under Title IX, a recipient generally must treat transgender students consistent with their gender identity in all aspects of the planning, implementation, enrollment, operation, and evaluation of single-sex classes."

In 2014 the Labor Department extended nondiscrimination protections to its transgender employees.

Also in 2014, the Equal Employment Opportunity Commission filed two lawsuits against companies accused of discriminating against employees on the basis of gender identity; these lawsuits were the first Title VII (of the Civil Rights Act of 1964) action taken by the federal government on behalf of transgender workers. The lawsuits were filed for Amiee Stephens and Brandi Branson, both transgender women. The clinic being sued on behalf of Branson settled with her in 2015, admitting no wrongdoing but agreeing to pay her $150,000 in backpay and damages and agreeing to implement gender identity nondiscrimination protections and trainings for employees.

In 2014, it was decided that transgender people receiving Medicare may not be automatically denied coverage by them for sex reassignment surgeries.

Also in 2014, the Social Security Administration (SSA) stated that although its "past policy was to refer all marriage-based claims involving transgender individuals for a legal opinion from the Regional Chief Counsel[,] [o]ur new policy allows us to process most claims... without the need for a legal opinion." This change came soon after Robina Asti, a 92-year-old transgender woman, was denied survivor benefits by the SSA for two years after her husband's death, benefits she finally received on February 14, 2014.

Also in 2015, the Occupational Safety and Health Administration published a Guide to Restroom Access for Transgender Workers, which provides guidance to employers on best practices regarding restroom access for transgender workers.

Also in 2015, the Justice Department announced that it had filed its first civil lawsuit on behalf of a transgender person (Rachel Tudor); the lawsuit was United States of America v. Southeastern Oklahoma State University and the Regional University System of Oklahoma, filed in federal court in that state.

Also in 2015, the Equal Employment Opportunity Commission ruled for the first time that Army-imposed restroom restrictions on a transgender civilian employee (Tamara Lusardi) violated the sex discrimination provisions of the Civil Rights Act of 1964.

Also in 2015, new guidance was issued from the U.S. Departments of Health and Human Services, Labor, and the Treasury declaring that when:

an attending provider determines that a recommended preventive service is medically appropriate for the individual – such as, for example, providing a mammogram or pap smear for a transgender man who has residual breast tissue or an intact cervix – and the individual otherwise satisfies the criteria in the relevant recommendation or guideline as well as all other applicable coverage requirements, the plan or issuer must provide coverage for the recommended preventive service, without cost sharing, regardless of sex assigned at birth, gender identity, or gender of the individual otherwise recorded by the plan or issuer.

In 2016, the U.S. Department of Health and Human Services ruled for the first time that transgender people are entitled to surgical benefits provided under Medicare Advantage insurers, including sex reassignment surgery; the ruling came in a case regarding the transgender woman Charlene Lauderdale but does not only apply to her.

Also in 2016, guidance was issued by the Departments of Justice and Education stating that schools which receive federal money must treat a student's gender identity as their sex (for example, in regard to bathrooms). However, this policy was revoked in 2017.

==== Federal courts ====
Starting in January 2014, each American state must have a Health Benefit Exchange where individuals and families can buy health care plans, and no state's exchange may discriminate against consumers on the basis of gender identity.

In 2015, a federal court first confirmed that the Affordable Care Act prohibits discrimination against transgender people by any health care provider accepting federal funds. Specifically, in the case of a young transgender man who said he was badly mistreated in a Minnesota hospital, the court ruled that Section 1557 of the Affordable Care Act prohibits gender identity discrimination under the umbrella of sex discrimination, and that by accepting Medicare and Medicaid funds the hospital was subject to the law.

An important legal victory for transgender people occurred in April 2016, when the 4th U.S. Circuit Court of Appeals ruled in favor of transgender male student Gavin Grimm, which marked the first ruling by an appeals court to find that transgender students are protected under federal laws that ban sex-based discrimination. The ruling came on a challenge to the Gloucester County School Board's policy of making transgender students use alternative restroom facilities. However, later in 2016 the U.S. Supreme Court agreed to put that ruling on hold. Then in 2017 the U.S. Supreme Court vacated the decision of the 4th U.S. Circuit Court of Appeals and refused to hear the case. Later in 2017, it was announced that the 4th Circuit would send the case back to the district court for the judge to determine whether the case was moot because Grimm graduated.

Late in 2016, an injunction was issued against a federal regulation created to prevent health care discrimination on the basis of gender identity (as well as abortion).

In 2016, for the first time, the Justice Department used the Matthew Shepard and James Byrd, Jr. Hate Crimes Prevention Act to bring criminal charges against a person for selecting a victim because of their gender identity. In that case, Joshua Brandon Vallum pled guilty to murdering Mercedes Williamson in 2015 because she was transgender, in violation of the Matthew Shepard and James Byrd, Jr. Hate Crimes Prevention Act.

==== State government ====
===== California =====
In California in 2011 the FAIR Education Act (Senate Bill 48) became law, requiring the inclusion of political, economic, and social contributions of transgender people (along with lesbian, gay, and bisexual people and people with disabilities) in California's textbooks and public school social studies curricula.

In 2013 California enacted America's first law protecting transgender students; the law, called the School Success and Opportunity Act, declares that every public school student in California from kindergarten to 12th grade must be "permitted to participate in sex-segregated school programs and activities, including athletic teams and competitions, and use facilities consistent with his or her gender identity, irrespective of the gender listed on the pupil's records."

In 2014, California became the first state in the U.S. to officially ban the use of trans panic and gay panic defenses in murder trials.

===== Maine =====
A 2013 case in Maine decided by the Maine High Court involving a teenage girl guaranteed her right to use the girls' bathroom in high school. This was the first occasion that a state court ruled that it is unlawful to deny a transgender student access to the bathroom matching their gender identity.

===== North Carolina =====
The Public Facilities Privacy & Security Act, officially called "An Act to Provide for Single-sex Multiple Occupancy Bathroom and Changing Facilities in Schools and Public Agencies and to Create Statewide Consistency in Regulation of Employment and Public Accommodations" but commonly known as "House Bill 2" or "HB2", is an act passed in the U.S. state of North Carolina in March 2016. It has been described as the most anti-LGBT legislation in the United States. Proponents of HB2 call it "common sense" legislation, while advocates of repeal say replacing it with an anti-discrimination law is "common sense". One contentious element of the law eliminates anti-discrimination protections for gay, bisexual, transgender, genderqueer, and intersex people, and legislated that in government buildings, individuals could only use restrooms and changing facilities that correspond to the sex on their birth certificates. This was criticized because it prevented transgender people who did not or could not alter their birth certificates from using the restroom consistent with their gender identity: in North Carolina, only people who undergo sex reassignment surgery can change the sex on their birth certificates, and outside jurisdictions have different rules, some more restrictive. The legislation changes the definition of sex in the state's anti-discrimination law to "the physical condition of being male or female, which is stated on a person's birth certificate." The act also prohibits municipalities in North Carolina from enacting anti-discrimination policies, setting a local minimum wage, regulating child labor, or making certain regulations for city workers. The legislation initially removed the statutory and common-law private right of action to enforce state anti-discrimination statutes in state courts, but was later amended to restore that right. On May 9, 2016, the United States Department of Justice sued Governor Pat McCrory, the North Carolina Department of Public Safety, and the University of North Carolina system, stating that House Bill 2 violates Title VII of the Civil Rights Act, Title IX of the Education Amendments of 1972, and the Violence Against Women Act. On the same day, North Carolina's governor and legislative leaders filed two separate lawsuits against the Department of Justice to defend the law. Two private lawsuits were also filed, one challenging and the other defending the law. The portion of the law regarding bathroom use based on gender assigned at birth was repealed and replaced with House Bill 142 on March 30, 2017.

===== Oregon =====
On June 10, 2016, an Oregon circuit court ruled that a resident, Elisa Rae Shupe, could obtain a non-binary gender designation. The Transgender Law Center believes this to be "the first ruling of its kind in the U.S."

On June 15, 2017, Oregon became the first state in the U.S. to announce it will allow a non-binary "X" gender marker on state IDs and driver's licenses, beginning July 1. No doctor's note will be required for the change.

===== Washington D.C. =====
On June 27, 2017, Washington, D.C., became the first place in the U.S. to offer a non-binary "X" gender marker on driver's licenses and ID cards.

=== Military ===
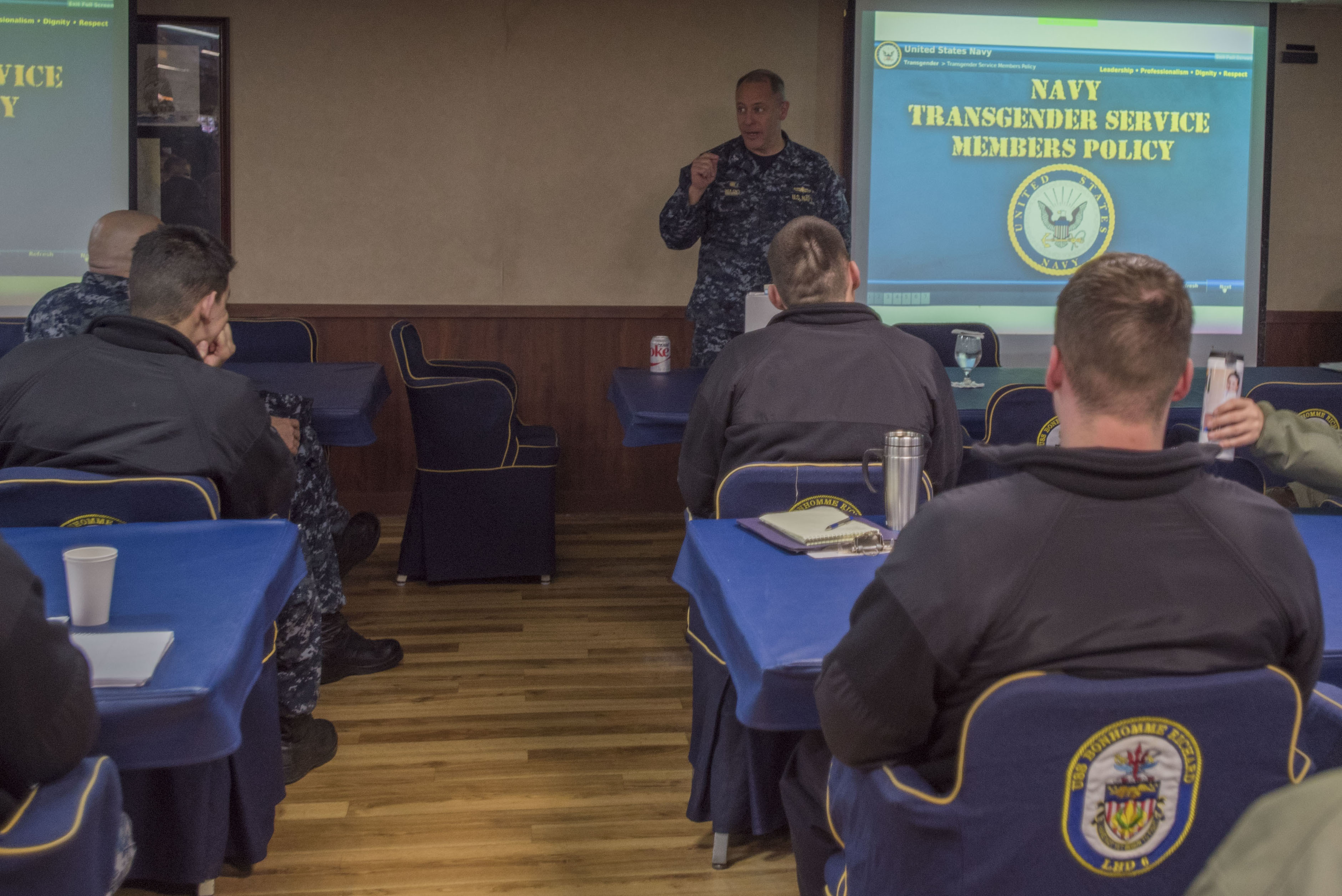
US Navy transgender training on board USS Bonhomme Richard

In 2015 the Army issued a directive that protected transgender soldiers from being dismissed by mid-level officers by requiring the decision for discharge to be made by the service's top civilian for personnel matters. Later that year, the Air Force stated that for enlisted airmen, there were no outright grounds for discharge for anyone with gender dysphoria or who identified as transgender, and that a person would only be subject to eviction from the Air Force if his or her condition interfered with their potential deployment or performance on active duty. Later in 2015, Navy Secretary Ray Mabus signed a memorandum directed to the Chief of Naval Operations and Commandant of the Marine Corps stating: "Effective immediately, separations initiated under the provisions of the reference for service members with a diagnosis or history of gender dysphoria, who identify themselves as transgender, or who have taken steps to externalize the condition, must be forwarded to the assistant secretary of the Navy (manpower and reserve affairs) for decision." Still later in 2015, Defense Secretary Ash Carter ordered the creation of a Pentagon working group "to study over the next six months the policy and readiness implications of welcoming transgender persons to serve openly." He also stated that all decisions to dismiss troops with gender dysphoria would be handled by the Pentagon's acting under Secretary of Defense for personnel and readiness (Brad Carson).

On June 30, 2016, Ash Carter announced that the ban on transgender people from openly serving in the US military had been lifted and that the United States Department of Defense was undergoing a twelve-month transition period to satisfy the needs of transgender soldiers. Just over a year later, in July 2017, President Donald Trump tweeted that transgender personnel would again be barred from the military, and he published a memo on August 25, 2017, directing that an implementation plan for a transgender ban be submitted to him by the Secretary of Defense and the Secretary of Homeland Security by February 2018.

On August 9, 2017, five transgender United States military personnel sued Trump and top Pentagon officials over the proposed banning of transgender people from serving in the military. The suit asks the court to prevent the ban from going into effect. Two major LGBT-rights organizations filed a petition in the United States District Court in Washington on behalf of the five transgender personnel. On August 28, 2017, the American Civil Liberties Union (ACLU) of Maryland filed a federal lawsuit, Stone v. Trump, on behalf of several transgender military service members, alleging that the ban violated their equal protection rights. The same date, Lambda Legal filed a federal lawsuit in Seattle on behalf of three trans people, the Human Rights Campaign, and the Gender Justice League, alleging that the ban violated equal protection, due process and free speech protections. On September 5, 2017, Equality California filed a lawsuit in United States District Court for the Central District of California against the ban; the lawsuit includes four named and three unnamed transgender plaintiffs.

On August 29, 2017, Secretary Mattis announced that currently serving transgender troops would be allowed to remain in the armed services, pending further study. Mattis stated he would set up a panel of experts from the Departments of Defense and Homeland Security to provide recommendations on implementing the President's policy direction.

On January 25, 2021. U.S. President Joe Biden signed an executive which immediately revoked Trump's 2017 and 2018 transgender bans in both the U.S. Department of Defense and the U.S. Department of Homeland Security. The ban is also required to be completely reversed by both Departments following consultation with the U.S. Joint Chiefs of Staff.

=== Housing ===
In 2012 United States Department of Housing and Urban Development (HUD) Secretary Shaun Donovan announced new regulations that require all housing providers that receive HUD funding to prevent housing discrimination based on sexual orientation or gender identity. These regulations went into effect on March 5, 2012.

In a memo made public in 2015, officials issued guidance for Immigration and Customs Enforcement personnel directing staff to house transgender immigrants in sex-segregated housing that corresponds with their gender identity.

In 2016, the U.S. Department of Justice released guidelines forbidding corrections agencies from placing transgender inmates into men's or women's units solely based on their anatomy at birth.

Also in 2016, HUD declared that homeless shelters it funds must give transgender people the option of being housed with the gender with which they identify.

In 2018, the Transgender Offender Manual of the U.S. Federal Bureau of Prisons was revised; the revision removed the sentence, "The TEC [Transgender Executive Council] will recommend housing by gender identity when appropriate", and instead declared that housing for transgender inmates would be chosen on "a case-by-case basis". The revision also said that transgender inmate housing "will use biological sex as the initial determination", with gender identity being used to decide housing only "in rare cases".

=== Marriage and parenting ===
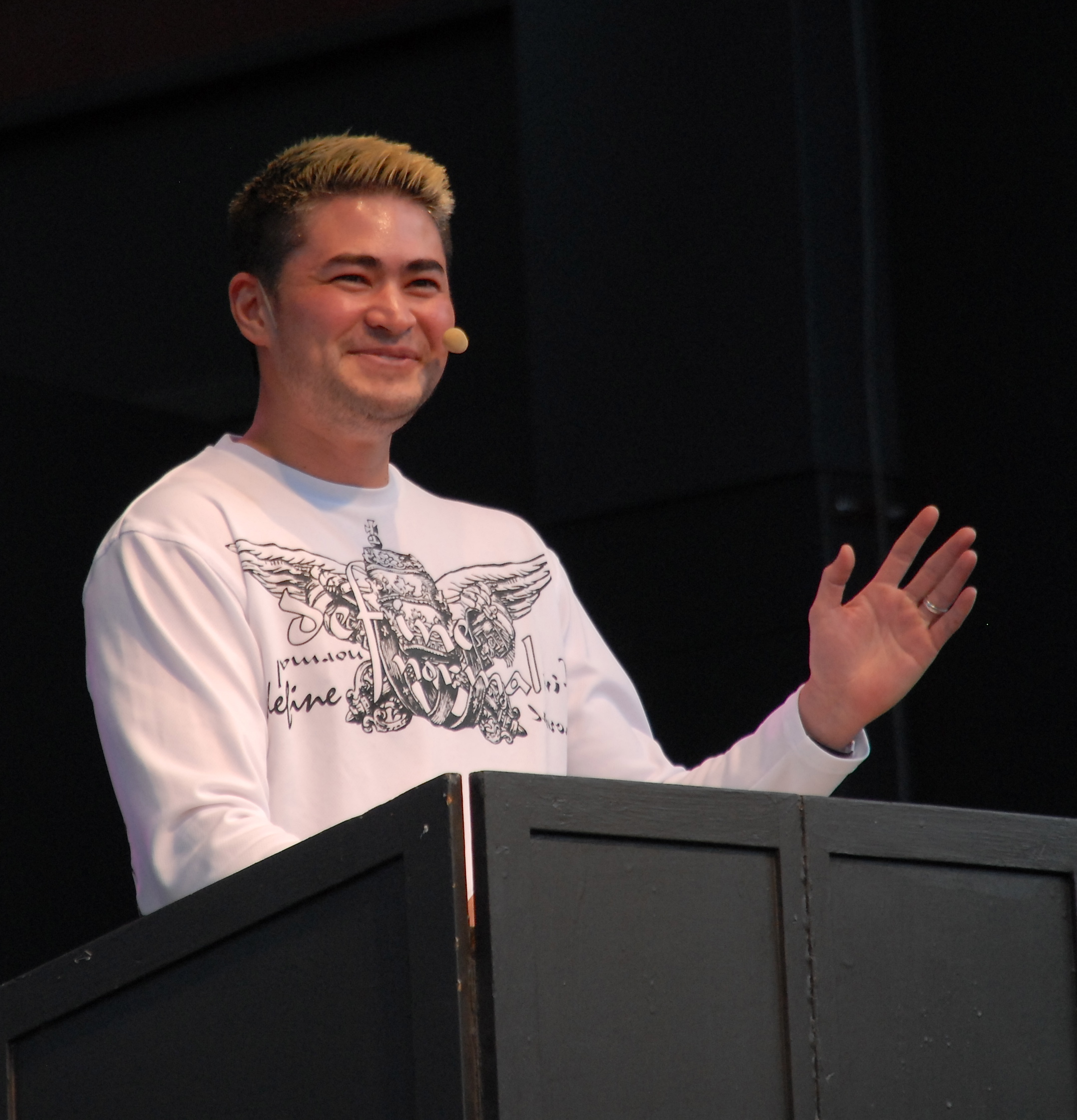
Trans man Thomas Beatie gave birth to a girl in 2008.

In 1976 the legal case M.T. v J.T., 140 N.J. 77, 355 A.2d 204, 205 (NJ Super. Ct. 1976), which went to the New Jersey Superior Court, affirmed the validity of marriage of a trans woman to a man, and legally affirmed the plaintiffs gender as a woman. This is believed to be the first legal case which specifically addresses transsexual marriage.

In the 1999 case Littleton v. Prange, 9 SW3d 223 (1999), Christie Lee Littleton, a post-operative female transsexual, argued to the Texas 4th Court of Appeals that her marriage to her deceased male husband was legally binding and she was entitled to his estate. The court decided that Littleton's gender corresponded to her chromosomes, which were XY (male). The court subsequently invalidated her revision to her birth certificate, as well as her Kentucky marriage license, ruling "We hold, as a matter of law, that Christie Littleton is a male. As a male, Christie cannot be married to another male. Her marriage to Jonathon was invalid, and she cannot bring a cause of action as his surviving spouse." Littleton appealed to the Supreme Court but it denied her writ of certiorari on October 2, 2000.

In the 2001 case In re Estate of Gardiner (2001) the Kansas Appellate Court applied a different standard to the marriage of transgender woman J'Noel Gardiner, concluding that:

[A] trial court must consider and decide whether an individual was male or female at the time the individual's marriage license was issued and the individual was married, not simply what the individual's chromosomes were or were not at the moment of birth. The court may use chromosome makeup as one factor, but not the exclusive factor, in arriving at a decision. Aside from chromosomes, we adopt the criteria set forth by Professor Greenberg. On remand, the trial court is directed to consider factors in addition to chromosome makeup, including: gonadal sex, internal morphologic sex, external morphologic sex, hormonal sex, phenotypic sex, assigned sex and gender of rearing, and sexual identity.

Gardiner ultimately lost her case in the Kansas Supreme Court, which declared her marriage invalid.

In 2002 transgender man Michael Kantaras made national news when he won primary custody of his children upon divorce; however, that case was reversed on appeal in 2004 by the Florida Supreme Court, upholding the claim that the marriage was null and void because Michael Kantaras was still a woman and same-sex marriages were illegal in Florida. The couple settled the case with joint custody in 2005.

The 2005 case re Jose Mauricio LOVO-Lara, 23 I&N Dec. 746 (BIA 2005) considered marriage under federal law, as it pertains to immigration. The Board of Immigration Appeals (a federal body under the US Department of Justice) ruled that for purposes of an immigration visa: "A marriage between a postoperative transsexual and a person of the opposite sex may be the basis for benefits under ..., where the State in which the marriage occurred recognizes the change in sex of the postoperative transsexual and considers the marriage a valid heterosexual marriage."

== 2020s ==
=== Restrictions of rights ===
==== Gender-affirming care bans for minors ====
Several states, including Alabama, Arizona, Missouri, Texas, and Louisiana, have enacted laws that restrict or outright ban gender-affirming care for transgender minors. These bans typically prevent access to puberty blockers, hormone therapy, and in some cases, gender-affirming surgery for individuals under 18. Legal challenges against these bans are ongoing in multiple states.

==== Restrictions on sports participation ====
Laws have been passed in states like Kentucky and Tennessee prohibiting transgender youth from participating in sports consistent with their gender identity. These laws apply to various educational levels, from primary through to higher education.

==== Educational restrictions ====
Laws in states like Florida and South Dakota restrict discussions of gender and sexual orientation in schools, with civil penalties for violations that can include lawsuits and fines.

=== Expansions of rights ===
==== Legal recognition of gender identity ====
States like Vermont have passed laws allowing individuals to amend their birth certificates to reflect their gender identity. Maryland has expanded nondiscrimination laws to include gender identity, protecting students in both public and private schools that receive state funding.

==== Repeals of discriminatory laws ====
Idaho repealed an outdated sodomy law, which was part of broader efforts to remove laws that have been used to target the LGBTQ+ community.

== See also ==
- Transgender history
- Current issues of gender inequality in the United States for transgender people
- History of the transgender movement in the United States
- List of transgender-rights organizations in the United States
- Transgender people's legal rights in the United States
- Transgender disenfranchisement in the United States
- Transphobia in the United States
- LGBT people in prison
