= LGBTQ topics in Korea =

LGBTQ in Korea may refer to:

- LGBT rights in North Korea
- LGBT rights in South Korea
- LGBTQ history in South Korea
- LGBT health in South Korea
- Sexuality in South Korea
- Sexual orientation and gender identity in the South Korean military
- Recognition of same-sex unions in South Korea
- Transgender people in South Korea
