= Chingusai =

LGBT organization in South Korea

- 친구사이, Ch'in'gusai
- Predecessor: Chodonghwe
- Formation: February 1994; 32 years ago
- Type: NGO
- Location: Jongro-gu, Nakwon-dong, Seoul
- Region served: South Korea
- Representative: Kim Kihwan
- Website: https://chingusai.net

Chingusai (Korean: 친구사이; RR: Chingusai; MR: Ch'in'gusai) is a South Korean gay human rights group founded in February 1994. It originated from Chodonghwe, the first organization that advocated for the human rights of the Korean LGBTQ+ community. Chingusai's main focus is to raise awareness on the importance of LGBTQ+ human rights and fight against the prejudices on sexual minorities in South Korea through social activism.

== Historical background ==
=== 1993–1997: The origins of Chingusai ===
In December 1993, a group of seven people decided to form Chodonghwe as a way to concentrate their different backgrounds in LGBTQ+ activism. Some people had experience of gay gatherings outside of Korea, some were HIV activists, and others were issued from smaller gatherings such as the veterans of Nakwon-dong, a queer district affiliated to Jongro-gu in Seoul, or Sappho, a lesbian social club created in 1990 predominantly by American expats, US military personnel, and Korean Americans. One month after its creation, Chodonghwe led to the creation of two separate groups: one focused on gay human rights (Chingusai), and the other on lesbian human rights (Kkirikkiri).

Chingusai started their official activities by publishing a newsletter on February 7, 1994, and organizing a seminar on homosexuality soon after on April 3. The same year, some members of the group shared their coming-out experiences through their "first gay memoir" entitled "No longer sad or ashamed" (더 이상 슬프지도 부끄럽지도 않다, Tŏ isang sŭlp'ŭjido pukkŭrŏpchido ant'a, Seoul: Chŏngjamot, 1994). Those first activities were inscribed in an attempt to give more visibility to the LGBTQ+ community in the mainstream media as a way of "transform[ing] the Nakwon-dong culture", a term referring to the obscure gay neighborhood of Nakwon-dong, Jongro-gu. It was introduced by the gay activist Seo Dong-jin, a cultural critic who was the first person to make his coming-out publicly. Aside from his activities in Chingusai, he introduced queer theory in Korea and had a central role in the apparition of LGBTQ+ gatherings in Korean universities.

In comparison to other groups at that time, Chingusai, by appointing public representatives that already made their coming-out, acted as a public organization aiming to raise awareness on LGBTQ+ related issues through meetings, counseling, and publications.

=== 1995–2000: A gay men's human rights group ===
Chingsusai took part in the creation of the Korean Council of Homosexual Rights Activist Groups (KCHRAG, 한국동성애자 인권단체 협의회, Han'guk tongsŏngaeja In'kwŏn danch'e hyŏbŭihoe) in 1995 along with Kkirikkiri, Maŭm001 (LGBTQ+ students gathering of Seoul National University), Come Together (LGBTQ+ students gathering of Yonsei University).

On June 28, 1998, KCHRAG merged with other LGBTQ+ human rights related organizations (for a total of 26 groups) and became the Korean Homosexuals Human Rights Association (한국동성애자 단체협의회, Han'guk tongsŏngaeja danch'e hyŏbŭihoe) through a public announcement made in T'apkol park (Jongro). This particular date was chosen as a commemoration of the Stonewall riots One of their first regular activities was to organize every summer starting 1995, a three-day "Summer Human Rights Camp".

In 1997, Chingusai officially stood up as an organization advocating for LGBTQ+ human rights. It was also a significant year for the organization as they decided to concentrate their activities on raising awareness on HIV, destigmatizing the relationship between HIV and gay individuals, but also protecting HIV-seropositive human rights. The reason under that is that one of the first activists of Chingusai, Oh Junsu, was an HIV-seropositive who died in 1998.

In May 1998, Chingusai established their headquarters in Jongro district, Nakwon-dong and a year after in 1999, they received with Kkirikkiri the Felipa de Souza Award from IGLHRC (International Gay and Lesbian Human Rights Commission).

=== 2001–2002: Apparition of online communities and difficulties ===
In parallel with the apparition of groups advocating for LGBTQ+ human rights such as Chingusai, also appeared a lot of online communities (BBS) such as Xzone, Hwarang (actually Ivancity) and Tajinet. Those BBS were hosted on the major internet servers at that time (e.g. Hitel, Chollian or Nawnuri).

One of the communities, Xzone (엑스죤), was asked by the Commission of Youth Protection (청소년보호위원회, Ch'ŏngsonyŏnbohowiwŏnhoe) and the Ethics Committee on Information and Communication (정보통신윤리위원회, Chŏngbot'ongshinyulliwiwŏnhoe) to shut down the page for displaying inappropriate content that they qualified under the label "homosexuality". Chingusai and other LGBTQ+ organizations/groups such as Hongkŏjimo, Donginryŏn, Bŏdi and the Seoul Queer Film Festival - reunited under the "Joint Task Force Opposing Discrimination against Homosexuals" (동성애자 차별 반대 공동 행동, Tongsŏngaeja ch'abyŏl pandae kongdong haengdong) - filed a lawsuit and succeeded in suppressing the label "homosexuality" and cancelling the decision of shutting down the website.

First created in 1995, the influence of those online communities grew fast near 2001–2002. They made able for people to communicate instantly and anonymously, in opposition to Chingusai that was more focusing on offline meetings. This raising of popularity of online communities coincided with a period of financial and internal difficulties for Chingusai. Another attempt of unity was made in 2002 along with Kkirikkiri and other organizations called LGBT Korea (한국 동성애자 연합, Han'guk Tongsŏngaeja yŏnhap) but did not get the expected results.

=== 2003–2010: New projects and affirmation of Chingusai's identity ===
Starting in 2003, Chingusai took a step aside from the different unions and instead switched back their focus on organizing events and gather people through different ways. For example, a chorus called G_Voice was created in November and is still nowadays a solid trademark of Chingusai. This period also marks the return to financial and administrative stability.

In 2006, Chingusai changed its tagline from "Korean gay men's human rights association" (한국 남성 동성애자 인권운동 단체, Han'guk namsŏng tongsŏngaeja in'gwŏnundong tanch'e) to "Korean gay human rights association" (한국 게이 인권운동 단체, Han'guk gei tongsŏngaeja in'gwŏnundong tanch'e) in order to broaden the target of their action.

If Chingusai would usually change their focus every year in reaction to the different events, they decided in 2010 to settle three main values that would define the three central directions of their plans.

== Main values and activities ==
=== Facilitate the process of coming out ===
If Hong Seok-cheon is famous for being one of the first celebrity to come out, the activists of Chingusai were actually the first to come out in the mainstream media. As a result, one of the main activity of Chingusai is to provide all the tools for the LGBTQ+ community in South Korea to realize a successful Coming Out.

In 2001, Chingusai started the "Coming Out Interview Series" in which members would come out through an interview uploaded on the group website. Once 100 people are gathered, a book compiling the interviews will be published. They released in 2007, a "Coming Out Guide" for people who needed assistance in revealing their sexual identity.

=== An alternative community (대안의 공동체) ===
Another objective of Chingusai is to provide different types of spaces for the LGBTQ+ Korean community to gather.

Chingusai is especially well-known for their offline gatherings such as their swimming club Marine Boy (마린보이, Marin boi), their gay choir G_Voice (지_보이스, ji_poiseu), their hobby-sharing club Saturday Gathering (토요모임, t'oyo moim) and finally their reading club (책읽당, ch'aek iktang).

Even if they first focused on offline communities, Chingusai also has an online community on their website.

=== An overwhelming change (가슴 벅찬 변화) ===
As an important factor in the increasing visibility of the LGBTQ+ community in the Korean mainstream media, Chingusai also took part in a lot of activities related to culture, and especially film production.

Chingusai participated in the production of various movies and documentaries, such as Camellia (동백꽃, Tongbaekkkot) in 2004, celebrating the ten years of the association. Two famous queer movie directors were also the main representative of the association: Lee-song Hee-Il in 1999 and Kim-Jho Gwangsoo in 2013.

Chingusai participated in the production of Kim-Jho Gwangsoo's short movies like Boy Meets Boy (소년, 소년을 만나다, Sonyŏn, sonyŏn ŭl mannada) in 2008, and Just Friends? (친구사이, ch'in'gusai) in 2009.

In 2010, Chingusai also co-supervised with the "gathering for a culture embracing sexual minorities" and the movie director Yi Hyŏnsang, a documentary called The Miracle of Jongro. It shows the daily life and coming out of four gay men: a movie director (Lee Hyŏksang), a human rights activist (Jang Pyŏngkwŏn), a cook (Choe Yŏngsu) and an office worker (Chŏng Yul). The movie director Lee Hyŏksang official came out by featuring in this documentary.

== List of publications ==
Books
Title (Korean)	Title (McCune-Reischauer)	Title (English Translation)	Date of Publication	Publisher
GAY CULTURE HOLIC: 친절한 게이문화 안내서	GAY CULTURE HOLIC: ch'inchŏlhan geimunhwa annaesŏ	GAY CULTURE HOLIC: a friendly guide to gay culture	February 1, 2011	씨네21북스 / Cine21 Books

Data Archives
Title (Korean)	Title (McCune-Reischauer)	Title (English Translation)	Date of Publication	Access Link
청소년과 동성애 - 청소년 동성애자의 삶과 문화 -	Ch'ŏngsonyŏn'gwa tongsŏngae: ch'ŏngsonyŏn tongsŏngaejaŭi samkwa munhwa	Youth and Homosexuality: the life and culture of young LGBTQ+	April 2, 2005	https://chingusai.net/xe/index.php?mid=library&category=116153&document_srl=116183
청소년 동성애자 이해를 위한 교사간담회 자료집	Ch'ŏngsonyŏn tongsŏngaeja ihaerŭl wihan kyosagandamhoe charyojip	Data Compilation of teacher meetings for the young LGBTQ+	October 2005	https://chingusai.net/xe/index.php?mid=library&category=116153&document_srl=116185
토론회 <청소년 동성애자의 오늘 - 담론, 정책, 기획> 자료집	T'oronhoe "Ch'ŏngsonyŏn tongsŏngaejaŭi onŭl: tamnon, chŏngch'aek, kihoek" charyojip	Debate "Today's young LGBTQ+: discourse, policies, planning" Data compilation	October 2005	https://chingusai.net/xe/index.php?mid=library&category=116153&document_srl=116187
청소년 동성애자 인권을 위한 교사지참서	Ch'ŏngsonyŏn tongsŏngaeja in'gwŏnŭl wihan kyosajich'amsŏ	Teacher's Guide Book for Human Rights of Young Gay Boys and Girls	November 25, 2005	https://chingusai.net/xe/index.php?mid=library&category=116153&document_srl=152458
금기와 침묵을 넘어 동성애자 차별의 성역	Kŭmgiwa ch'immukŭl nŏmŏ tongsŏngaeja ch'abyŏrŭi sŏngyŏk	Surpassing taboo and silence: range of discrimanations against sexual minorities	May 9, 2006	https://chingusai.net/xe/index.php?mid=library&category=116153&document_srl=116158
동성애자의 가족 구성권 토혼회	Tongsŏngaejaŭi kajok kusŏnggwŏn t'ohonhoe	Debate on the right of establishing a family for sexual minorities	September 23, 2006	https://chingusai.net/xe/index.php?mid=library&category=116153&document_srl=116170
동성애자 가족 구성권 자료집	Tongsŏngaeja kajok kusŏnggwŏn charyojip	Compilation of Data regarding the right of establishing a family for sexual minorities	2006	https://chingusai.net/xe/index.php?mid=library&category=116153&document_srl=116172
커밍아웃 가이드	K'ŏmingaut kaidŭ	Coming Out Guide	November 2007	https://chingusai.net/xe/Coming_guide/116461
군대와 게이, 불편한 관계 속에서 인권의 길을 찾다	Kundaewa kei, pulp'yŏnhan kwan'gye sogesŏ in'gwŏnŭi kirŭl ch'atta	Gays and the military, looking for human rights in an uncomfortable relationship	November 11, 2008	https://chingusai.net/xe/index.php?mid=library&category=116153&document_srl=116156
군 관련 성소수자 인권승진을 위한 무지갯빛 인권바랍! 군대에서 솔솔~ 프로젝트 모둠자료집	Kun kwallyŏn sŏngsosuja in'gwŏnsŭngjinŭl wihan mujigaetpit in'gwŏnbarap! kundaeesŏ solsol~ p'ŭrojekt'ŭ modumjaryojip	Rainbow Human Rights for an amelioration of LGBTQ+ human rights in the military: compilation of data regarding the project	2008	https://chingusai.net/xe/index.php?mid=library&category=116153&document_srl=116160
한국 LGBTI 커뮤니티 사회적 욕구조사 최종보고서	Han'guk LGBTI k'ŏmyunit'i sahoejŏk yokkujosa ch'oejongbogosŏ	Key Results of the South Korean LGBTI Community Social Needs Assessment Survey	October 2014	https://chingusai.net/xe/index.php?mid=library&category=116153&document_srl=416855
친구사이 오프라인 소식지 두번째 묶음 <스물셋>	Ch'in'gusai op'ŭrain soshikchi tubŏntchae mukkŭm "Sŭmulset"	Second Offline Newsletter of Chingusai "Twenty Four"	May 30, 2016	https://chingusai.net/xe/index.php?mid=library&category=116153&document_srl=480501
2016 한국 성인 레즈비언, 게이, 양성애자 건강 연구: 자살과 관련한 정신건강을 중심으로	2016 Han'guk sŏngin rejŭbiŏn, kei, yangsŏngaeja kŏn'gang yŏn'gu: chasalgwa kwallyŏnhan chŏngshin'gŏn'gangŭl chungshimŭro	Study of the Health of Adult Lesbians, Gays and Bisexuals in 2016: focusing on the issues of mental health and Suicide	January 25, 2017	https://chingusai.net/xe/index.php?mid=library&category=116153&document_srl=492053
<자살위기 상황에 놓인 성소수자의 이해와 접근>	"Chasarwigi sanghwange noin sŏngsosujaŭi ihaewa chŏpkŭn"	Understanding and approaching the crisis of suicide among LGBTQ+	August 21, 2017	https://chingusai.net/xe/index.php?mid=library&category=116153&document_srl=532036
성소수자 모임이나 단체에서 자살이 발생했을 때 어떻게 해야 할까요?	Sŏngsosuja moimina tanch'eesŏ chasari palsaenghaessŭl ttae ŏttŏk'e haeya halkkayo?	What to do when an LGBTQ+ gathering or organization faces suicide?	September 10, 2018	https://chingusai.net/xe/index.php?mid=library&category=116153&document_srl=582637

== List of representatives ==
- Yi Humyŏng (1994)
- Pak Chinsŏk (1994)
- Yi Rim (1995)
- Kim Chunsŏk (1996)
- Kim Kihyŏn (1997)
- Chŏn Chŏngnam (1998)
- Lee-song Hee-Il (1999)
- Sin Chŏnghan (2000)
- Pak Chŏlmin (2001)
- Pak Chŏlmin, Kim Byŏngsŏk (2002)
- Chŏn Cheu (2003)
- Choe Chunwŏn (2004)
- Pak Kangsŏk (2005)
- Yi Chonggŏl (2006-2007)
- Han Karam (2008-2009)
- Pak Chekyŏng (2010-2012)
- Kim-Jho Gwangsoo (2013)
- Cho Namung (2014-2015)
- Pak Kiho (2016)
- Kim Chanyŏng (2017)
- Kim Kihwan (2019)

== See also ==
- LGBT history in South Korea
- LGBT rights in South Korea
- Sexuality in South Korea
