= Edhi Alice =

2024 South Korean documentary

- Hangul: 에디 앨리스
- RR: Edi Aelliseu
- MR: Edi Aellisŭ
- Directed by: Ilrhan Kim
- Produced by: Sona Jo
- Cinematography: Chul-nyung Heo, Saebyeol Jeong
- Edited by: Hyuksang Kimsan Lee, Hakmin Lee
- Music by: Minhwi Lee
- Release date: 2024
- Running time: 130 minutes
- Country: South Korea
- Language: Korean

Edhi Alice (Korean: 에디 앨리스) is a 2024 South Korean documentary film directed by Ilrhan Kim. The film follows Edhi and Alice, two transgender women in South Korea, while also showing parts of the documentary filmmaking process. Queer East UK listed it as a 130-minute South Korean feature documentary. It had its world premiere at the International Documentary Film Festival Amsterdam in 2024.

The film's production credits include Sona Jo as producer and Younghee Han for PINKS as executive producer. IDFA also lists Chul-nyung Heo and Saebyeol Jeong as cinematographers, Hyuksang Kimsan Lee and Hakmin Lee as editors, Eunha Koh as sound designer, and Minhwi Lee as composer. The film was produced by PINKS, a South Korean queer feminist media group.

== Synopsis ==
The documentary centers Alice, who works as a lighting technician, and Edhi, as she prepares for and undergoes gender-affirming surgery. Both Alice and Edhi are the film's central subjects, making the film partly about their individual lives and partly about the process of filming them and documenting their transition process.

IDFA describes the film as having two parts: the first focuses on Edhi as she hopes to feel more comfortable in her body after surgery, while the second turns to Alice, who is at a different stage in her life and transition. The documentary also shows Edhi and Alice dealing with family relationships, public baths, and gender identification before a passport change.

The film also includes the background story of Hui-su Byun, who was discharged from military service after undergoing gender-affirming surgery while on leave. This places Edhi and Alice’s personal stories within a wider social context in South Korea and challenges faced by the transgender community.

== Production ==
The project developed from Ilrhan Kim's previous work with Edhi and Alice. In a director's statement, Kim said that, as an LGBTQ activist, she had been making videos with queer content before the film, with Edhi serving as the host of a web series she directed and Alice working on lighting for the production. Kim stated that the two began sharing personal details about their lives during breaks from filming, which became part of the basis for the documentary.

Kim said that one of the questions behind the film came from thinking about how bodily change is understood in relation to transgender identity. In the same statement, she wrote that Edhi's post-surgical bodily sensations led her to reflect on similarities and differences between trans and cisgender women's experiences of the body, and to question the social belief that transgender people can be accepted only when they change their bodies.

The film was also shaped by Kim's work with PINKS, a Korean queer feminist media collective. In an interview with IndieSpace, Kim described PINKS as an organization that began in 2004 with human rights activism and later redefined itself as a queer feminist media group. Kim also described the camera as a way to record the traces of social minorities and connect documentary filmmaking with activism.

Edhi Alice was produced in two related versions, Edhi Alice: Reverse and Edhi Alice: Take. In the IndieSpace interview, Kim said that Reverse followed the film's originally planned structure, while Take emerged after a suggestion to rearrange the narrative. She connected the titles to film terminology and to the idea of transition as a movement through time and space. The Seoul Independent Film Festival similarly described the two versions as having opposite narrative movements: Reverse moves from Edhi to Alice, while Take moves from Alice to Edhi.

Kim's directing intention was to present transition not only as a linear process of hormone therapy, surgery, or legal gender correction, but also as a layered and recurring experience of identity, body, relationship, and space. The film therefore makes parts of the filmmaking process visible, including the crew, directing, editing, and the relationship between the filmmaker and the participants. In an interview, Kim said that showing the conditions of filming was important for creating a sense of safety around representation, especially in scenes that are often omitted from films about transgender women's bodies.

== Release and Distribution ==
Edhi Alice premiered at the International Documentary Film Festival Amsterdam (IDFA) in 2024. The film was screened as the closing-night presentation of Queer East at the Institute of Contemporary Arts in London on 18 May 2025, followed by an in-person Q&A with director Ilrhan Kim.

The film screened in a number of university and community settings in the United States in 2026, including screenings held at Duke University, Emory University, UCLA, USC, Stanford University, UC Berkeley, and UC Davis. It also screened at a community event presented by GYOPO, the International Documentary Association, and PINKS at the Japanese American National Museum in Los Angeles.

== Reception ==
Jennie Kermode of Eye for Film wrote that Edhi Alice avoids treating transgender identity as a single universal experience. She argued that the film places two Korean transgender women side by side while showing that their lives are different, even when they face related social pressures. Kermode also noted that the film’s structured form still allows natural moments with its subjects to emerge.

Queer East described the film as an examination of how documentaries about trans communities are made, including the creative decisions, relationships, and ethical questions involved in the process. IDFA described the documentary as an "elegant portrait" of two South Korean women in transition, with the film moving from Edhi’s story to Alice’s.

The Heinrich Böll Foundation discussed Edhi Alice: Reverse in relation to the Korean Queer Film Festival and the cancellation of an originally planned venue, framing the film within broader debates over queer visibility and cultural representation in South Korea.

== See also ==
- Cinema of South Korea
- LGBTQ rights in South Korea
- Documentary film
