= Seo Dong-jin =

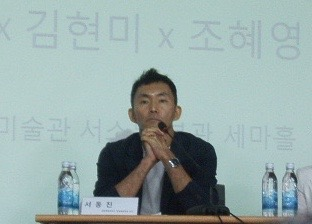
- Seo Dong-jin, a professor in the Round Table event at Seoul Museum of Art
- Education: Yonsei University
- Known for: Cultural critic
- Scientific career
- Fields: Sociology
- Institutions: Chingusai
- Website: Official website

Seo Dong-jin is a South Korean sociologist, a cultural critic and a university professor. He was one of the first main activists of the Korean Gay men human rights association Chingusai. Aside from his activities, he introduced queer theory in Korea and had a central role in the apparition of LGBTQ+ gatherings in Korean universities.

He defines himself as a "progressive homosexual intellectual who demands a better life for lesbians and gays". Through the publication of his interrogations and observations, he wants for members of sexual minorities to find empathy and feel less excluded in Korean society.

== The public figure to come out in the South Korean mainstream media ==
Seo Dong-jin invented the term "transform[ing] the Nakwon-dong culture," referring to the obscure gay neighborhood of Nakwon-dong, Jongro-gu in Seoul.

At this time a student at the Graduate School of Sociology in Yonsei University, Seo Dong-Jin decided in March 1995 to publish in the student journal a simple announcement with the motive to find other homosexuals "like him" and create a gathering to discuss, share experiences together.

He will specify after that by creating a gathering in the university, he wanted to get over the "ghettoized" aspect of what was called the "Nakwon-dong" gay community, too sexualized and to develop homosexual identity by questioning important issues like gay human rights. Yonsei University, the first university to get such a gathering, was followed two months after by Seoul National University and the creation of "Maeum 001 (마음001)", the number "001" representing the percentage of recognition of gay human rights in Korean society.

He was also part of the first apparition of a homosexual community on television. On December 15, 1995, on KBS' "Come Together", he decided to come out on television with other members of Yonsei University's LGBTQ+ gathering in order not only to discuss the rejection of homosexuals but also to fight against the stigma linking homosexuality and HIV in Korean society.
