= Sexual orientation and gender identity in the South Korean military =

Sexuality in the South Korean military

South Korean military laws and procedures discriminate against sexual minorities, or lesbian, gay, bisexual, transgender, and queer (LGBTQ+) individuals, who serve in the military. At the time of enlistment, recruits are categorized based on their physical and mental health. Sexual minorities can be marked as having a “mental handicap” or “personality disorder,” which determines their status and duties as personnel. They can also be institutionalized in a mental facility or be dishonorably discharged. Military personnel have reported experiencing harassment, violence, and forcible revealing of their sexual orientation and/or gender identity.

Under Article 92-6 of the Military Penal Code, homosexuality acts are labelled as “sexual assault/harassment” and considered punishable by a maximum of two years in prison. In April 2022, the Supreme Court ruled that this law cannot be applied to consensual acts that occur outside of military facilities during off-duty hours. However, the judgement was overturned by the Constitutional Court of Korea on 26 October 2023.

LGBTQ+ human rights activists and other civic groups have asserted that these military policies are unconstitutional, discriminatory, and a violation of one's privacy and the right to determine one's own sexual orientation and gender identity. Representatives of the right-wing Christian groups and other conservatives have expressed that loosening the restrictions on same-sex relations could undermine military discipline and national security. There have been several protests and advocacy efforts to help combat these discriminatory practices. The constitutionality of Article 92 has been contested several times in court, but its constitutionality has continued to be upheld. Despite inevitably facing imprisonment due to its illegality, LGBTQ+ individuals have used conscientious objection to protest the discrimination of sexual minorities and the dominant masculine and patriarchal culture in the military.

== Military service in South Korea ==
There is mandatory conscription for all able-bodied South Korean men in which they are expected to serve nearly two years. Women may also serve if they choose to do so. Draft evasion is one of the most hated crimes in South Korea and could lead to a loss of societal respect and honor. Military service is seen as a rite of passage to becoming a "real" man and a loyal citizen. Those who refuse to serve cannot invoke conscientious objection as a reason to not serve since it is illegal. Due to the military's discriminatory practices and an oppressive culture, a few conscripts prefer imprisonment over completing their military service.

== Article 92-6 ==
Sexual orientation and gender identity is not addressed in civilian law.

Although Article 92-6 of the Military Penal Code explicitly states that all sexual acts between members of the same gender is categorized as "sexual assault and/or harassment," the Supreme Court ruled in April 2022 that this does not apply to consensual acts that occur outside of military facilities during off-duty hours. Military personnel can also be dishonorably discharged based on same-sex relations. If one is discharged based on same-sex relations, it can pose serious, life-long consequences and discrimination.

=== Constitutionality ===
The constitutionality of Article 92-6 has been contested in court several times. In 2008, a local military court filed a petition claiming that regulation of an individual's sexual preference was a violation of one's right to define their sexuality and of one's privacy. A sergeant first class was indicted for sexual molestation of a colleague, but the military court questioned its legitimacy and the case was handed over for constitutional review. While the case was under constitutional judgment, a revision was made to a corresponding clause in which the maximum imprisonment for homosexual acts was changed from a year to two years.

In 2011, the Constitutional Court of Korea eventually ruled that Article 92-6 is constitutional. The court upheld its previous rulings in 2002 and 2008 and stated that the punishment was to maintain order in the military and that criminal law and military criminal law are to be differentiated where the latter's purpose was for military discipline and national security. The court ruling said, "The corresponding clause may be regarded neither ambiguous, nor unnecessarily discriminative against homosexual individuals. Anyone with common sense may judge what the clause signifies by 'homosexual relations and other sexual acts of sexual molestation,' and abide by the contents.”

=== Debate about same-sex relations in the military ===
Human rights activists and civic groups express that these discriminatory practices in the military are a violation of one's privacy and of one's right to determine their own sexual orientation and gender identity. According to them, Article 92-6 is unconstitutional and should be repealed. There should also be stricter punishments for those who commit crimes of sexual violence.

Representatives of the right-wing Christian groups and other conservatives cite that same-sex relations will undermine military discipline and national security:

"If homosexuality is allowed in the military, sexual violence can increase in such a hierarchical organization, and this will lead to the weakening of the military morale and the exposure to serious diseases such as AIDS. It will be the North Korean regime that will rejoice at the weakening of our military morale." Seong-dong Kim, Korean Church Commission

They have deployed rhetoric connecting anti-gay sentiments with anticommunism, arguing that homosexuality threatens the masculinity of the military and therefore weakens the military's defense against North Korea.

== Regulations on Physical Examination for Recruits ==
The Regulations on Physical Examinations of Recruits define those with homosexual relations and non-cisgender identities as a mental disease, labeling them as "sexual orientation disorder" and "gender identity disorder". [See Criterion 102 in table below] The regulations also determine whether transgender people are fit to serve by basing decisions on their anatomy, as exemplified in Criteria 384 and 394 in the table, and their legal gender status.

Regulations on Physical Examination for Recruits: Evaluation Standards of Illnesses and Other Psychological and Physical Disorders (excerpts from 2012)
Specialization	Criteria	Evaluation Grade for Conscription
Psychiatry	102. Personality disorder and behavioral disorder (sexual orientation disorder, gender identity disorder, etc.); A. Further observation necessary B. Mild C. Medium D. Severe	A. Grade 7 B. Grade 3 C. Grade 4 D. Grade 5
Urology	384. Loss or atrophy of testicles; Atrophy: loss of more than two-thirds of testis A. One side B. Both sides	A. Grade 4 B. Grade 5
Urology	394. Severance of Penis; Applies to subjects incapable of sexual intercourse and transgendered subjects (including those who have undergone procedures to insert objects in the genital area) A. Partial loss of glans B. Complete loss of glans C. More than half of penis is severed	A. Grade 4 B. Grade 5 C. Grade 5

Key for Evaluation Grade

- Grade 1 to 4: Fit for active duty or Supplementary service duty.
  - Grade 1 to 3: Fit for active duty.
  - Grade 4: Fit for active or Supplementary service duty.
- Grade 5: Unfit for active or Supplementary service duty.
- Grade 6: Unfit for any military service due to mental or physical disability. Exempted.
- Grade 7: Treatment in progress. Subject to re-examination.

=== Transgender and gender non-conforming personnel ===
As more people have come out and identified themselves as transgender, the South Korean military has had to create regulations for transgender people. The military only recognizes trans men or trans women. Those who may identify as a gender non-conforming or do not adhere to the gender binary are ignored.

Trans men are considered to be disabled, impaired, and not fit for military service even though some trans men may want to serve. Trans men who change their legal gender are assigned to Grade 5, which makes them unfit for active or reservist duty.

Trans women are unwilling to complete the mandatory conscription have two options, either to gain exemption or serve as a "man". Trans women who have not undergone gender reassignment surgery or who are not willing to have any medical treatment are forced to serve. A 2006 Supreme Court ruling stated that trans women who have a legal gender change are automatically exempt from military service. However, a legal gender change is difficult to obtain. The criteria to change one's legal gender includes written diagnoses of transsexualism from two or more psychiatrists, sterilization, and genital reconstruction. The average costs for orchiectomy and vaginoplasty are about 2 million won (US$1,900) and 12 million won (US$11,500), and these procedures are not covered by insurance. As a result, most trans women cannot obtain exemption by way of a legal gender change.

Trans women may also gain exemption by being diagnosed as having a severe case of "gender identity disorder" while undergoing the physical examination for recruits. A military doctor must diagnose the individual with "gender identity disorder" as mild, medium, or severe - only those who have a severe diagnosis are exempt. In addition, they must prove they have been medically treated for 6 months, been hospitalized for more than one month, or have other severe symptoms of gender identity disorder. Although not a legally sanctioned practice, an orchiectomy procedure would allow for an individual to meet another exemption criterion of "testicle loss". [See Criterion 384 and 394 in the table] Between 2012 and 2015, 104 trans women were exempt based on "testicle loss" in comparison to the 21 trans women who were exempted based on "gender identity disorder".

== Discrimination cases and efforts to reform ==
Military personnel have expressed difficulties in navigating military service life as a sexual minority. While some have completed military service without getting caught, there have been various cases where personnel have encountered dire situations regarding their sexual orientation and gender identity. As a response, there have been efforts to resist and reform the military institution both by individuals and organizations, which includes challenging the constitutionality of Article 92-6 as mentioned earlier.

Personnel would typically conceal their sexual orientations and gender identities in fear of harassment, discrimination, and other forms of violence towards them. Yol Jeong, a Korean queer activist, revealed how he was tormented in the military when he came out as gay:

I was sent to a hospital where people beat me, mocked me and ordered me to harass another man. Even after I was sent back to the camp, I was branded as one to be 'watched out for' where people monitored my every move. Not many were willing to be a true friend. My life there was miserable and lonely.

Some reported that senior officers would notify parents of personnel about their sexual orientations without consent. Those who sought counseling were sent to hospitals for intensive mental care and sometimes HIV tests were conducted. Other soldiers were granted discharge for medical and family reasons. However, medical officers required soldiers to submit images or videos showing their sexual acts with other men as hard evidence in order to authorize their medical discharge. Those who refused to submit evidence had to return to their units and were subjected to unwarranted scrutiny after their sexual orientations were revealed.

In 2006, 35 human rights organizations and the Labor Party of Korea held a press conference and protested the military for failing to protect a gay soldier's privacy. The victim's sexual orientation was revealed through photographs he submitted as evidence for his medical discharge. Suffering from depression and suicidal thoughts, he sought the aid of Gay Rights Solidarity (GRS) during his leave. GRS reported this case to the National Human Rights Commission of Korea (NHRCK), in which an investigation team was dispatched to the victim's military unit.

In 2010, a woman was subject to corrective rape by a captain and a lieutenant commander. The High Military Court of Korea acquitted both the lieutenant commander, who initially received a 10-year prison sentence in the first trial, and the captain, who was originally sentenced to eight years. Civic groups, such as the Military Human Rights Center and the Korean Sexual Violence Counseling Center, held an emergency press conference in front of the High Court of Military Tribunal in Seoul and criticized the ruling for becoming a "shield of sex offenders". They emphasized that in order to eliminate sexual violence in the military, sexual offenders should not be given indulgences.

In 2017, there was widespread crackdown of homosexuality in the military. At least 32 were criminally charged for "sodomy or other disgraceful conduct". Military officials insisted that they were trying to root out sodomy and other homosexual activities. A video on social media was tipped to the army that showed a male soldier and male officer having sex. The soldier was arrested for spreading obscene content online and for violating military code. Officials also forced soldiers to hand in their phones without warrants, identify other soldiers who were on their contact lists, and contact other soldiers on mobile dating apps. When male and female officers were found having sex on duty in 2011, they were not criminally charged and only suspended for three months. In contrast, 18 gay soldiers faced criminal charged despite having sex on leave or off duty. Students from Sogang University protested the Army Chief of Staff, chanting for the "gay soldier witch hunt" to stop immediately. They were restrained and dragged out.

=== Conscientious objection ===
The conscientious objection movement in South Korea was initially ignited by religious and pacifist groups whom claimed that serving in the military would be in direct conflict with their beliefs. Conscientious objection is illegal and objectors face imprisonment for draft evasion. LGBTQ+ individuals have adopted conscientious objection to protest and critique the military institution for its toxic masculine culture.

== See also ==
- LGBT history in South Korea
- LGBT rights in Asia
- LGBT rights in South Korea
- Byun Hui-su
