= Masculinities Without Men? =

Book by Jean Bobby Noble

Masculinities without Men?
- Author: Jean Bobby Noble
- Language: English
- ISBN: 0-7748-0997-3

Masculinities without Men? is a book by Jean Bobby Noble.

== Summary ==
Noble explores how the construction of gender was thrown into crisis during the twentieth-century, resulting in a permanent rupture in the sex/gender system, and how masculinity became an unstable category, altered across time, region, social class, and ethnicity. Noble demonstrates that transgender and transsexual masculinity began to emerge as a unique category in late twentieth-century fiction, distinct from lesbian or female masculinity.

== Reception ==
Masculinities without Men? has gotten some significant scholarly notice. However, reviews of the book have been mixed.

== See also ==
- List of transgender-related topics
