= Marshall G. Gardiner =

American journalist and politician (1912–1999)

Member of the Kansas House of Representatives from the 5th district
- In office 1957–1960

Personal details
- Born: Marshall Gephart Gardiner; September 27, 1912
- Died: 1999 (aged 86–87)
- Party: Democratic
- Spouse(s): Mary (died 1984) J'Noel Ball (m. 1998)
- Children: 1
- Occupation: Journalist; stockbroker; politician
- Military career
- Allegiance: United States
- Branch: United States Army
- Conflicts: World War II
- Awards: Philippine Liberation Ribbon

Marshall Gephart Gardiner (September 27, 1912 – 1999) was a news journalist at the Leavenworth Times and member of the Kansas House of Representatives from 1957 to 1960.

== Early life ==
Marshall Gephart Gardiner was born on September 27, 1912, to Alice (née Gephart) and Joseph Emmett Gardiner. His father and uncle were newspaper publishers in Valley Falls, Winchester and Oskaloosa. His father worked on the Leavenworth Times. His grandfather, Marshall Gephart, was a lawyer and judge in Valley Falls and Oskaloosa. Gardiner was descended from Lion Gardiner, a real estate investor in Long Island. He grew up in Leavenworth, Kansas.

== Career ==
Gardiner served as an engineer in the U.S. Army amphibious forces in World War II. He served in the South Pacific. He received a Bronze Arrowhead, four battle stars and the Philippine Liberation Ribbon.

Gardiner worked as a news reporter at Leavenworth Times for 15 years. He also worked as a stockbroker. Gardiner served as justice of the peace in Leavenworth until his resignation in January 1957.

Gardiner was a Democrat. He worked as a precinct worker, district chairman and the treasurer of the state Democratic committee. Gardiner started serving in the Kansas House of Representatives in 1957. He was re-elected for a second term in 1958. Gardiner lost the 1960 election to William H. Avery. Gardiner ran for election in 1964, but lost to Dempsey.

== Personal life ==
Gardiner married Mary. His wife was also a writer at Leavenworth Times and died in 1984. They had one son, Joe. Gardiner married J'Noel Ball, a finance professor at Park College, in September 1998 in Oskaloosa.

Gardiner died in 1999 of a heart attack. After his death, Gardiner's son filed the lawsuit In re Estate of Gardiner against Gardiner's widow after her transgender identity was revealed.

== Legacy ==
In 1994, Gardiner donated $125,000 to the science program at Park College.
