= Sa Bangji (film) =

- Theatrical poster
- Hangul: 사방지
- Hanja: 舍方知
- RR: Sa Bangji
- MR: Sa Pangji
- Directed by: Song Kyung-shik
- Written by: Chi Sang-hak; Ahn Tae-geun
- Produced by: Jeong Jun-gyo
- Starring: Lee Hye-young; Bang Hee; Kwak Jung-hee; Park Am; Lee Kyoung-hee
- Cinematography: Joo Hong-shik
- Edited by: Kim Hyeon
- Music by: Kim Hyeon
- Production company: In Chang Films Co.
- Release date: October 29, 1988
- Running time: 94 minutes
- Country: South Korea
- Language: Korean

Sa Bang-ji (Korean: 사방지) is a 1988 South Korean film directed by Song Kyung-shik. The film was inspired by the real life Sa Bangji, an intersex person of the Joseon period.

== Plot ==
Sa Bangji is an intersex person with both female and male genitalia, born to a hardened criminal and mentally disturbed woman. Taken in at a monastery, Sa Bang-ji meets and falls in love with a grieving young widow, Lee So-sa, but she betrays her when their relationship is discovered by the elders in her family. Sa Bang-ji manages to escape and meets a shaman priestess named Myo-hwa, with whom she plots to take revenge. After Myo-hwa is killed, Sa Bang-ji and So-sa are reunited, but then Sa Bang-Ji is captured and killed and So-sa commits suicide.

== Cast ==
- Lee Hye-young
- Bang Hee
- Kwak Jung-hee
- Park Am
- Lee Kyoung-hee
- Jo Seong-geun
- Cho Ju-mi
- Han Young-su
- Lee Young-gil
