= Robina Asti =

American flight instructor and transgender advocate (1921–2021)

- Born: Robina Fedora Asti; April 7, 1921; New York City, U.S.
- Died: March 12, 2021 (aged 99); San Diego, California, U.S.
- Known for: Oldest flight instructor LGBT activism
- Awards: Oldest flight instructor
- Aviation career
- First flight: PBY Catalina
- Famous flights: July 23, 2020 as flight instructor (age 99)
- Air force: US Navy

Robina Fedora Asti (April 7, 1921 – March 12, 2021) was an American flight instructor and advocate for women's and transgender rights. Her advocacy changed government rules to allow transgender people to receive Social Security survivor benefits. In July 2020, Asti was awarded two Guinness World Records for being the oldest active pilot and active flight instructor.

== Childhood and education ==
Asti was born April 7, 1921, in Manhattan, New York, to David Astey, a featherweight boxer, and Helen (Jund) Astey, a homemaker. Asti was assigned male at birth, and did not begin to identify as female until adulthood. Her father had anglicized their last name for his career; Robina changed it back to the Italian spelling when she transitioned. She grew up in Greenwich Village, taking an early interest in electrical engineering. As a teenager, she earned money fixing radios around the neighborhood, with a steady flow of customers.

She attended Brooklyn Technical High School until age 17, when she dropped out to join the United States Navy.

== Career ==
Asti was initially stationed on Wake Island where she was active in installing radios in naval aircraft in the run up to World War II. She later became a pilot, stationed at Midway Island in the Pacific Ocean where she flew reconnaissance PBY Catalina planes in order to detect Japanese ships. She was later promoted to test pilot. She was discharged after the war ended at the rank of lieutenant commander and began a career as a flight instructor.

Upon returning to New York, she opened a supper club in White Plains, New York with three friends from the Navy, although the restaurant business did not suit her and she soon sold her share of the company. She would go on to work at the mutual fund company E.W. Axe. She rose to become a mutual fund vice-president but quit prior to her gender transition, feeling it was not tenable in the workplace.

Subsequently, she took the jobs available to her as a woman, including as a makeup artist at Bloomingdale's to learn how to sew and use an iron on clothing in order to become the "best goddamned woman I could be". She also was chairperson of the Hudson Valley chapter of the Ninety-Nines women's aviation organization.

== Personal life ==
Asti married Evangeline Diaz-Perez of Palm Beach, Florida, in 1958. They had four children, one of whom died in childhood.

With the support of her wife, Asti began hormone replacement therapy on February 14, 1976, following the birth of their youngest child. This was followed by sex reassignment surgery. The couple amicably separated soon afterwards, and Asti moved back to New York City. There, she met artist Norwood Patten; they married in 2004.

== Activism ==
Asti was not an activist for much of her life but also did not shy away from confronting injustice where she encountered it. Shortly after transitioning, Asti learned from her doctor that the Federal Aviation Administration required an internal physical exam in order to renew her pilot's license. She found this highly objectionable and working with an organization of female pilots, the Ninety-Nines, successfully petitioned the government to drop the rule.

Following her husband's death in 2012, Asti applied for Social Security benefits, but was denied due to her being transgender. She successfully challenged this in court with representation from Lambda Legal. A film titled Flying Solo: A Transgender Widow Fights Discrimination about her life and struggles with Social Security was produced and aired at the 2015 TransReelization event. After having seen the ongoing discrimination against trans people, Asti became more actively involved in LGBT activism throughout her 90s. She gave a TEDx presentation in 2016 titled "War Stories and a Woman's Changes" about her life as a trans individual and her advice for young LGBT people and the ongoing fight for equality. She worked with her grandson to found the Cloud Dancers Foundation in 2019 in order to ensure there is active advocacy for elderly trans people.

== Awards and recognition ==
On July 23, 2020, Asti gave a flight lesson at Riverside Municipal Airport in California at age 99, establishing a new world record for oldest flight instructor. She was listed in the 2020 edition of the Out100 list of most influential LGBTQ+ individuals of the year.

== Death ==
Asti died on March 12, 2021, in San Diego, California, at the home of her daughter, where she had moved during the COVID-19 pandemic. She was 99.

== See also ==
- Jan Morris
- List of LGBT people from New York City
- LGBT culture in New York City
- Transgender legal history in the United States
