= In re Estate of Gardiner =

- Court: Supreme Court of Kansas
- Full case name: In the Matter of the Estate of Marshall G. Gardiner, Deceased
- Decided: March 15, 2002
- Citations: 42 P.3d 120 (Kan. 2002); 273 Kan. 191 (2002); 2002 Kan. LEXIS 117

Holding
- "A post-operative male-to-female transsexual is not a woman within the meaning of the statutes and cannot validly marry another man."

Court membership
- Chief judge: Kay McFarland
- Associate judges: Robert E. Davis, Donald L. Allegrucci, Bob Abbott, Frederick N. Six, Tyler C. Lockett, Edward Larson, Timothy Brazil (assigned to participate)

Case opinions
- Decision by: Donald L. Allegrucci
- Robert E. Davis took no part in the consideration or decision of the case.

In re Estate of Gardiner, 42 P.3d 120 (Kan. 2002), is a case in which the Kansas Supreme Court voided the marriage of a man and a trans woman, holding that the latter was considered male under Kansas law, and thus the state's prohibition on same-sex marriage precluded the legal validity of the marriage.

The case concerned the marriage of J'Noel Ball, a finance professor at Park College, and Marshall G. Gardiner, a donor to Park College who had previously twice served in the Kansas House of Representatives. The marriage took place in Oskaloosa, Jefferson County, Kansas in September 1998 when Ball was 40 and Gardiner was 85. J'Noel Ball took her husband's surname. Marshall Gardiner died in August of the following year; he left a $2.5 million estate but no will.

Joe Gardiner challenged the disposition of his father's estate, arguing that J'Noel was legally male and therefore that his father's marriage to her was invalid. In legal documents, he described J'Noel as having a mental disorder. In January 2002, he told a New York Times reporter that J'Noel's gender was an "illusion" and contrary to the "laws of God."

The district court agreed with the son, ruling that J'Noel was male. The Kansas Court of Appeals reversed the district court's decision, ruling that the marriage was valid in part because J'Noel had a functional vagina and the marriage had been sexually consummated, but in March 2001 the Kansas Supreme Court reversed the appellate court in part and affirmed the district court. The Kansas Supreme Court wrote that "a male-to-female post-operative transsexual does not fit the definition of a female." The Supreme Court of the United States denied certiorari on October 7, 2002.

== Criticism ==
The ruling has also been described as "de-sex"ing transgender people, based on the court statement that the "words 'sex,' 'marriage,' 'male,' and 'female' in everyday understanding do not encompass transsexuals."

Because J'Noel was born in Wisconsin, and the laws of that state allowed her to change the sex on her birth certificate, the ruling was criticized for violating the full faith and credit clause of the United States Constitution.

== Related cases ==
On February 18, 2003, the Maryland Court of Appeals ruled unanimously that a transgender woman may be recognized as a woman if she provides some type of medical evidence of a "permanent and irreversible change." The ruling was in favor of Janet Heilig.

In 2004, the Florida Second District Court of Appeal ruled that a transgender man had no child custody claim in his divorce because he was not a man and therefore his marriage to a woman was invalid. The ruling was against Michael Kantaras.
