= Lopez v. River Oaks Imaging & Diagnostic Group, Inc. =

- Court: United States District Court for the Southern District of Texas
- Full case name: Izza Lopez, a/k/a Raul Lopez, Jr. v. River Oaks Imaging & Diagnostic Group, Inc.
- Decided: April 3, 2008
- Docket nos.: 4:06-cv-03999
- Citation: 542 F. Supp. 2d 653

Court membership
- Judge sitting: Nancy Atlas

Lopez v. River Oaks Imaging & Diagnostic Group, 542 F. Supp. 2d 653 (S.D. Tex. 2008), is a federal lawsuit asserting that it is sex discrimination under Title VII of the Civil Rights Act of 1964 for an employer to refuse employment to a person who does not present him- or herself in a manner that is sufficiently consistent with the stereotypical presentation of that person's sex.

== Background ==
Izza Lopez was a transgender woman from Texas. Born Raul Lopez Jr., she had lived as a woman for many years.

In September 2005, Lopez applied for a job as a scheduler at River Oaks Imaging & Diagnostic Group, using the name "Izza Lopez" on her résumé and job application. Following an interview Lopez was offered the position, subject to passing a drug screening and a background check. Lopez filled out the necessary paperwork for the checks using the name "Izza (Raul) Lopez". After Lopez had given notice at her current place of employment River Oaks rescinded the job offer. The reason give was her "misrepresentation" of herself as a woman. Lopez filed a discrimination complaint with the Equal Employment Opportunity Commission, which issued a "Notice of Right to Sue". Lopez filed suit in the United States District Court for the Southern District of Texas. Lambda Legal, an LGBT-interest public interest group, filed a discrimination lawsuit on Lopez's behalf. Lambda Legal's transgender law specialist Cole Thaler was lead attorney. Ken Upton, Lambda's senior staff attorney, assisted him.

== Outcome ==
On April 3, 2008, District Judge Nancy Atlas ruled that "Lopez has stated a legally viable claim of discrimination as a male who failed to conform with traditional male stereotypes". Atlas dismissed River Oaks' motion for summary judgment and partially dismissed Lopez's motion for summary judgment, allowing the suit to proceed. Both parties agreed to mediation and the lawsuit was concluded on May 16.
