= Transgender people in South Korea =

Transgender is a term describing someone with a gender identity inconsistent with their gender assigned at birth. In South Korea, transgender communities exist and obtaining gender affirmation surgery is possible, but there are many barriers for transgender people in the country. The former head of the LGBT Human Rights of Korea once stated that "Of all sexual minorities, transgender is the lowest class. They are often abandoned by their families and most of them drop out of school because of bullying. The inconsistency between their appearance and their citizen identification numbers often makes it hard for them to land decent jobs."

== History of transgender people in Korea ==
=== Early history ===
On August 13, 1955, the Seoul Red Cross Hospital successfully performed the first gender reassignment surgery in Korea.

=== History of transgender people in the entertainment industry ===
Since then, there have been multiple transgender people in the public eye in South Korea since the early 2000s. The second person in South Korea to legally change their sex was Harisu (하리수), a South Korean singer, model, and actress. To "create a space for the many who have hurt like I do and are isolated a little with seniors and juniors" Harisu opened "Tran-Mix in Apgujeong, Seoul in June 2009. Lady (레이디) debuted in 2005 with four members, Sinae (신애), Sahara (사하라), Binu (비누), and Yuna (유나) and was the country's first all transgender group. The group was inspired by the emergence of Harisu and her subsequent rise to fame. They later disbanded in 2007. South Korean model and singer Choi Han-bit (최한빛) debuted in the girl group Mercury (머큐리) in 2016.

=== South Korean military and LGBT soldiers ===
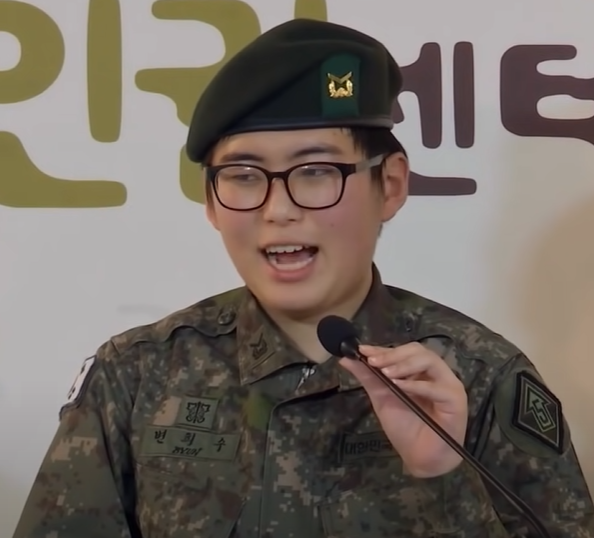
Byun Hui-su (변희수), a former soldier in the South Korean military and the first openly transgender soldier in the South Korean military, was discharged from the Korean army on January 22, 2020, after being declared “handicapped” as a result of her gender affirmation surgery.

The South Korean military has historically discriminated LGBT identified soldiers. In 2020, two soldiers were prosecuted for engaging in consensual oral sex, which according to the military code (Article 92-6) "bordered on rape." Soldiers have also been prosecuted under this code during their off duty time. Transgender people are not allowed to serve in the military. Byun Hui-su (변희수), a former soldier in the South Korean military and the first openly transgender soldier in the South Korean military, was discharged from the Korean army on January 22, 2020, after being declared “handicapped” as a result of her gender affirmation surgery.

=== Legal history ===
South Korea has no comprehensive set of anti-discrimination laws, but the “National Human Rights Commission of Korea has interpreted the prohibition of discrimination based on sexual orientation to cover discrimination on the basis of gender identity and against transgender people.” However, these guidelines are non-binding and the Human Rights Commission of Korea lacks enforcement power. Transgender people can change their legal gender on identification documents with a court decision, which is issued if individuals meet strict requirements including being 19 years old or older, not being married, parental consent, and having no minor children. South Korea is the only country to require parental consent for adults to change their gender. Additionally, South Korea and Japan are the only countries that require proof of nonmarital status. In June 2015, South Korean courts overturned a ruling banning LGBT+ pride parades imposed the month prior. The ban was the first in the 15 year event's history.

The only two genders legally recognized in South Korea are male and female. People identifying with other gender identities have no legal recourse to redefine their gender on identifying documents.

== Transgender people and Korean culture ==
=== Religion ===
Confucianism and its principles play a significant role in Korean culture. Confucianism became the official state religion of the Han dynasty in the 2nd century BCE. After the 14th century, Neo-Confucianism became widely accepted. This form of Confucianism emphasizes strict hierarchical roles in both the public and private sphere.

=== Society ===
In South Korea, "to change one's gender is to change one's gender role" as legal identification is closely tied with family relations, especially in regard to the use of family registers. In addition, the resident registration number (주민등록번호) issued to all Korean residents uses birth year and gender to generate the seventh digit of the number.

==== Attitudes towards transgender people ====
The UCLA School of Law Williams institute conducted a study in 2019 surveying Korean citizens to gauge public opinion of transgender rights in South Korea. According to the survey, “a majority supports access to gender-affirming surgery, the right to conceive or give birth to children, government protection from discrimination, and the right to serve in the military.” However, the public expressed lower support with regard to marriage to a person of the individual's birth sex, adoption, and bathroom use consistent with one's gender identity.

Surveys indicate that healthcare professionals in South Korea tend to hold strongly negative opinions of transgender individuals. It has also been found that healthcare providers with higher knowledge of trans people and trans issues had more positive dispositions towards trans people, but that healthcare providers with negative views tended to involve themselves much more heavily with the collection of data regarding trans people.

=== Literature ===
Ha Seong-nan's Flowers of Mold includes a story entitled "Your Rearview Mirror" with a transgender character. The character's plot line has been regarded as transphobic by some critics.

== Terminology ==
- 성전환자 (seongjeonhwanja) [性轉換者] literally means "someone who changes their sex"
- 트랜스젠더 (teuraenseujendeo is a transliteration of the English word “transgender” and is used in most contexts both spoken and written
  - 트젠 (teujen) is a shortened form of 트랜스젠더
