= Byun Hui-su =

South Korean soldier (1998–2021)

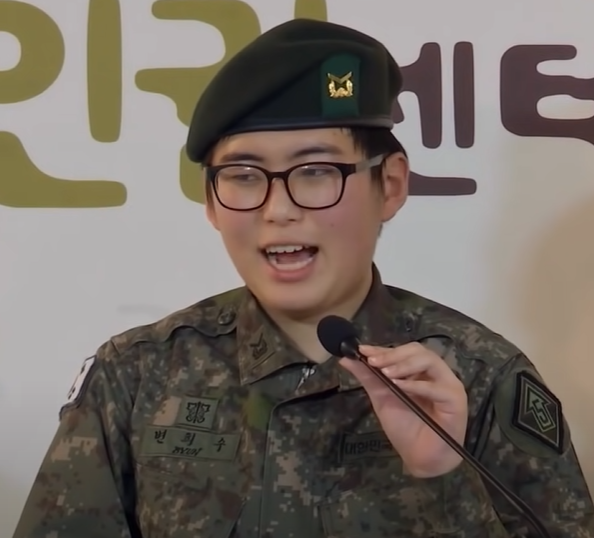
- Byun in 2021
- Born: 11 June 1998; Cheongju, South Korea
- Died: 27 February 2021 (aged 22); Cheongju, South Korea
- Burial place: Daejeon National Cemetery, Daejeon, South Korea
- Military career
- Allegiance: South Korea
- Branch: Republic of Korea Army
- Service years: 2017–2021

Korean name
- Hangul: 변희수
- RR: Byeon Huisu
- MR: Pyŏn Hŭisu

Byun Hui-su (Korean: 변희수; 11 June 1998 – 27 February 2021) was a South Korean soldier. Known as the first openly transgender soldier in Republic of Korea Army, she had risen to the rank of staff sergeant and was a tank driver before being discharged from the army in January 2020 after she underwent gender reassignment surgery in Thailand in November 2019. She had fought for the right to continue serving in the army, but was denied and discharged. The army subsequently denied her request for reinstatement in July 2020.

Speaking about her decision to undergo surgery, she stated, "I thought I would finish serving in the army and then go through the transition surgery and then reenter the army as a female soldier. But my depression got too severe. I want to show everyone that I can also be one of the great soldiers who protect this country."

On 3 March 2021, she was found dead in her home. Workers from the Sangdanggu National Mental Health Center, where Byun received treatment, called for someone to check up on her as they hadn't been able to reach her since 28 February. The fire department arrived at Byun's house, and found her body at 5:49 pm KST. Her body had already started to decompose. She was concluded to be dead on 27 February 2021.

In October 2021, South Korean court ruled that the military discharge was unlawful and cancelled the discharge. Ministry of National Defense did not appeal the decision. In April 2024, Ministry of Defense's Central Committee for Examination of Killed or Wounded in Action and Death or Injury in the Line of Duty decided to acknowledge that Byun died as a soldier on the line of duty, thus paved way to the possibility of Byun's burial in a national cemetery. The appeals committee found that she died of a depression caused by discharge, and decided there was a probable cause in relation to official duties. This overturned Army General Committee for Examination of Killed or Wounded in Action and Death or Injury in the Line of Duty's December 2020 decision which determined her death was not related to the discharge. She was laid to rest at Daejeon National Cemetery.

== See also ==
- LGBTQ history in South Korea
- LGBTQ rights in South Korea
- Sexual orientation and gender identity in the South Korean military
- Transgender personnel in the South Korean military
