= LGBTQ history in South Korea =

The modern South Korean LGBTQ rights movement arose in the 1990s, with several small organizations seeking to combat sexual orientation and gender identity discrimination.

== Early history ==
Although there is very little mention of homosexuality in Korean literature or traditional historical accounts, several members of nobility and Buddhist monks have been known to either profess their attraction to members of the same sex or else be actively involved with them. The earliest such recorded example might be that of King Hyegong, the 36th ruler of the Silla Dynasty who was killed at the age of 22 by his noblemen who revolted in protest of his "femininity".

King Mokjong (980–1009) and King Gongmin (1325–1374) of Goryeo are both on record as having kept several wonchung ("male lovers") in their courts as “little-brother attendants” (chajewhi) who served as sexual partners. After the death of his wife, King Gongmin even went so far as to create a ministry whose sole purpose was to seek out and recruit young men from all over the country to serve in his court. By contrast, Royal Noble Consort Sun, second consort to the then Joseon crown prince, was ejected from the palace and demoted to commoner status for having had sexual relations with one of her ladies maids.

Hwarang was the most overt form of same-sex relationships in ancient Korea. The sexual prowess of the hwarang were recorded in the Memorabilia of the Three Kingdoms, through pieces of Silla poetry such as Changipalang-ga (찬기파랑가), Mojugjilang-ga (모죽지랑가), and Ch'oyong-ga (처용가). During the Goryeo dynasty, same-sex sexual activity was not explicitly prohibited. During the Joseon Dynasty, however, Korean society experienced a draconian shift as the neo-Confucian elite and scholars declared homosexuality wicked and depraved, forcing homosexual activity to go underground and in secrecy.

Evidence of homosexual activities among the common people are harder to find as there are fewer records pertaining to them. Common people were less likely to be literate with writing and less likely to have their records preserved.

During the Joseon Era before the Japanese annexation there were travelling theater groups known as namsadang which included underaged males called midong (beautiful boys). The troupes provided "various types of entertainment, including band music, song, masked dance, circus, and puppet plays," sometimes with graphic representations of same-sex intercourse.

The Veritable Records of the Joseon Dynasty describes two intersex people during the Joseon Era: Sa Bangji and Im Seong-gu.

== Recent history in South Korea ==
Some of these organizations also work to prevent the spread of AIDS-HIV. Among the active organizations are;

- Solidarity for LGBT Human Rights of Korea
- Chingusai
- Korean Sexual-Minority Culture and Rights Center (KSCRC)
- Lesbian and Gay Alliance Against Discrimination in Korea (LGAAD Korea)
- Lesbian Counseling Center in S. Korea (Kirikiri)
- Beyond The Rainbow Foundation
- Parents and Families of LGBTAIQ People in Korea

One of the first legal victories of these organizations came in 2003, when the Korean National Human Rights Protection Committee formally advised the Korea's Youth Protection Committee to remove homophobic language from the Youth Protection Act of 1997, that had been used to justify the government harassment and censorship of LGBTQ South Korean film festivals and webpages.

In the Anti-discrimination Act introduced in 2007 by The National Human Rights Commission of the Republic of Korea, the section prohibiting discrimination based on sexual orientation has been withdrawn, following outrages from conservative Christian organisations.

While there are no federal laws against LGBTQ discrimination, various municipalities such as Seoul and Jeju have enacted their own ordinances against it.

In March 2015, the Ministry of Education enacted a new set of rules prohibiting the teaching of homosexuality or any other non-normative sexual orientations in sex education curricula.

On October 27, 2024, at 3 PM, a "200 Million Strong Unified Worship and Prayer Meeting of the Korean Church" took place in the Gwanghwamun area of Seoul. The event, organized by conservative Christian groups, aimed to gather 2 million believers to address concerns about recent legal rulings and advocate for the protection of biblical values, the church, future generations, and the nation.

=== Timeline of recent LGBTQ activism in South Korea ===
- 1993.12. Formation of South Korea's pioneer queer rights organization, Ch'odonghwe 초동회 (composed of three gay men and three lesbians) which later split into Chingusai and Kirikiri
- 1994.2. Dissolution of Ch'odonghoe 초동회
- 1994. Formation of two organizations: Chingusai 친구사이 (Between Friends) for gay men and KiriKiri 끼리끼리 for lesbians
- 1995. Online communication promotes further contact among LGBTQ communities. Proliferation of LGBTQ affinity/rights groups following the launch of LGBTQ organizations at Seoul National University and Yonsei University
- 1996. First lesbian bar (Lesbos) opens. Airing of “Gina Song Report”
- 1997. Korean Queer Film Festival is held for the first time. The first mass gathering of LGBTQ individuals, accompanied by the formation of “Union of College Lesbians and Gays” (Daedongin), which became Solidarity for LGBT Human Rights of Korea (Dong'illyŏn) later. First demonstrations for gay rights as an independent issue
- 1998. Launch of Buddy, Korea's first national gay-interest magazine. Key members of Buddy later establish the Korean Sexual Minority Culture and Rights Center (KSCRC) in 2003
- 1999. Growth of internet social networking sites (e.g. X-Zone, Hwa-rang, Tgnet..)
- 2000. in Seoul, Queer Culture Festival is held for the first time. Korean celebrity Hong Seok Cheon comes out
- 2001. Debut of entertainer Harisu, a transgender woman. Passage of the first National Human Rights Commission Act to include the term “sexual orientation”
- 2002. Controversy over the closure of X Zone by the Information Communication Ethics Committee
- 2003. The National Human Rights Commission recommends the removal of homophobic language in the Youth Protection Act. Yook Woo Dang, a youth member of Dong'illyŏn, commits suicide in the office.
- 2004. The Youth Protection Act Enforcement Decree removes homophobic language (the first of several revised statutes related to gay rights). The Korea Democratic Labor Party becomes the first national political body to establish an internal committee for LGBTQ issues.
- 2005. Project L(esbian) opens at Konkuk University. It was the first exhibition organized by openly bisexual women and lesbian artists in South Korea.
- 2006. Drafting of transgender sex change legislation joint solidarity. Proposal of special law initiative for sex change of transgender. Supreme Court approves sex change of transgender.
- 2007.10. A struggle begins in response to the section in the Anti-Discrimination Act prohibiting discrimination based on sexual orientation. The identity of bigotry is manifested.
- 2008. Choi Hyun Sook runs as the first openly lesbian candidate in the Korean general election. Formation of “Rainbow Action,” a coalition of LGBTQ organizations of Korea. First LGBT Human Rights Forum is held.
- 2010. “Life is Beautiful (ko: 인생은 아름다워)” a television drama containing the story of a gay couple, is nationally broadcast.
- 2011. Outbreak of hate crimes in Jongno. "Rainbow Action" stages a sit-in at the city council offices. The deadlock surrounding the attempt to pass the Ordinance for Student Rights in Seoul without including sexual orientation and gender identity among its protections resolves, and the Ordinance for Student Rights in Seoul passes.
- 2012. LGBTQ banners are banned by the local government of Mapo-gu, causing controversy.
- 2013. For the first time, transgender individuals can legally change their gender without gender reassignment surgery. The Democratic Party withdraws its Anti-Discrimination Act. Min Hong-Cheol, a Democratic Party member of the National Assembly, pushes for a retrogressive revision of the Military Criminal Law, which criminalizes even consensual sexual relationships in army.
- 2013. Movie director Kim Jho Kwang-soo and his partner Kim Seung-hwan become the first South Korean gay couple to publicly wed, although it is not a legally recognized marriage.
- 2014. Queer activists occupy the Seoul City Hall in protest.
- 2017. The Supreme Court ordered the government to allow "Beyond the Rainbow", an LGBTQ rights foundation, to register as a charity with the Ministry of Justice.
- 2018. Openly transgender Kim Ki-hong ran for the Jeju Special Self-Governing Provincial Council and failed. Beyond The Rainbow Foundation, Korea's first incorporated sexual minority human rights organization, was registered.
- 2019. The Seoul Metropolitan Police Agency granted permission to the Seoul Queer Culture Festival to host a parade within city limits, despite there being police concerns over threats and violence from counter-protestors. This contrasts with the agency's handling of the festival in 2015, in which they had denied permission to the parade amid concerns of traffic disruptions and violent counter-protests. The openly lesbian Kim Gyu-Jin married her partner. The female queer movie, "Moonlit Winter", was released and won the Queer Camellia prize at the Queer Camellia Award.
- 2020. Kim Gyu-Jin and her partner filed a marriage registration with the Jongno-Gu Office but received the notice of non-repair.
- 2021. South Korea's first transgender soldier named Byun, who was forcibly discharged after having gender reassignment surgery, was found dead. The defence ministry classified her loss of male genitals as a mental or physical handicap, and a military panel ruled in early 2020 that she would be compulsorily discharged.
- 2023. The Seoul High Court sided with a same-sex couple, who had filed a lawsuit against the National Health Insurance Service in 2021 after being denied spousal insurance benefits. The initial ruling by a lower court favored the insurer on the grounds that a same-sex union could not be considered a common law marriage under the current law.

=== Political representation ===
South Korean political parties tend to avoid formally addressing LGBTQ rights issues, as do most of the elected politicians. A major exception would be the Democratic Labour Party.

The Democratic Labour Party (Korean: 민주노동당), established in January 2000, is the third-largest political party in South Korea and has a political panel known as the Sexual Minorities Committee (Korean: 민주노동당 성소수자위원회) which advocates the recognition and political representation of sexual minorities. Their stated agenda includes a campaign against homophobia and discrimination based on sexual preferences, equal rights for sexual minorities (in their own words "complete freedom, equality, and right of pursuit of happiness for homosexuals") as well as the legalization of same-sex marriages. On its campaign bid for the 2004 parliamentary elections, the Democratic Labour Party promised the abolition of all inequalities against sexual minorities and won a record 10 seats in the Kukhoe National Assembly.

The Anti-Discrimination law has been proposed by all National Assembly (except for 20th National Assembly) since its initial motion in 2007, but has never been passed.

On December 19, 2007, Lee Myung-bak of the conservative Grand National Party won the presidential election. In a 2007 newspaper interview, the president-elect stated that homosexuality is "abnormal", and that he opposed legal recognition of same-sex marriages.

During South Korea's April 9, 2008 elections, Choi Hyun-sook (최현숙) became South Korea's first openly gay candidate for national public office when she ran for a seat in the National Assembly of South Korea. Her bid was unsuccessful.

During South Korea's 2018 elections, openly transgender candidate Kim Ki-hong (김기홍) ran for a seat in the National Assembly of South Korea. Kim ran again under the Green Party Korea in 2020 for the National Assembly of South Korea. Due to transphobic abuse Kim endured during the campaign, they committed suicide on February 24, 2021.

=== Educational and online representation ===
16-year-old female South Korean student, Kang Min-jin (강민진), was noticeable for publicizing a series of protests in front of the Seoul Metropolitan Office of Education for neglecting the sexual rights of South Korean teenagers.

==== LGBTQ activism in universities ====
In the late 1990s, college students became the leading voices of South Korea's Pro-Democracy Movement. In 1995, gay and lesbian student groups began to emerge on college campuses. Among them include Come Together at Yonsei University, Maum 001 at Seoul National University, Hwarang at Kunkook University, and Saram and Saram at Korea University. Students at Korean universities experienced difficulties with being open about their sexualities. Forming these groups on campuses legitimized and increased their visibility.

Two prominent members from Ch'ingusai, Dong-jin Suh and Jung-woo Lee, came out as openly gay at their respective universities, which encouraged more students to be open about their sexuality. In October 1995, these two male students teamed up with young feminist student activists to host a "Sexual Politics Festival" at Yonsei University. This event engaged university students in issues of campus rape, lesbianism, and family. Suh and Lee, among other student leaders, were given media attention for their activism. They were invited to television talk shows, radio shows, and university lectures to discuss their efforts at increasing the visibility of lesbians and gay men to the public.

==== LGBTQ online cultures ====
In 1995, South Korea's gay and lesbian communities grew more quickly than it had in previous years due to the influx of Bulletin Board Systems (BBS) on Korean internet servers. Three Korean servers, Hitel, Chollian, and Nownuri facilitated online communication between Korean gays and lesbians. The BBSs were computer systems with chat features that allowed users to interact with each other. The groups enabled queer South Koreans to share information and overcome isolation. From online communication, the members of the BBSs were able to organize meet-ups and spread educational information regarding the rise of HIV and AIDS, which were not always immediately accessible elsewhere. Eventually, these online chat groups lead to the emergence of popular websites where gay men and lesbians could interact with others from around the world. Some such websites included Exzone for gay men and TG-Net for lesbians.

=== Film representation ===
LGBTQ representation in South Korean film has been noted in films starting as early as the emergence of cinema in South Korea to the present. However, it should be recognized that categorization of LGBTQ films can be unclear due to variation in how LGBTQ characters and storylines are represented, ranging from subtle allusions to more obvious and overt depictions. Ambiguity as to what constitutes queer representation also stems from the debate over how to define the term "queer." While LGBTQ representation varies greatly in cinema, non-normative elements and transgressive qualities may promote a queer reading of film, thus placing it in the category of LGBTQ.

Films directed by openly LGBTQ directors have mostly been released independently and as short films. These include Lee Song Hee-il's films Everyday is Like Sunday (1997) and No Regret (2006) as well as Kimjo Kwang-soo's films Boy Meets Boy (2008) and Just Friends? (2009). Films by LGBTQ directors are not limited to short films however, as seen by the feature-length film by Kim Kyung-mook's, Stateless Things (2011).

Notable films in Korean queer cinema include Ascetic: Woman and Woman (Kim Su-hyeong, 1976) which won awards during the time of its release but did not receive much popularity. Road Movie (Kim In-shik, 2002), released through a major film company did not have the expected box office results, but has been seen as a precursor to queer films that came after it. One of the most mainstream and successful queer films is The King and the Clown (Lee Joon-ik, 2005) which represented LGBTQ themes mainly through it subtext rather than explicit depictions, but reached a mainstream audience. The Handmaiden (Park Chan-wook, 2016) also found striking success at the box office and like The King and the Clown, depicted homosexuality in a subtle way that conveyed queer sexual tension.

=== Music Representation ===
Kpop singer Bain became the first openly gay idol in a Kpop group.

=== Lesbian experience ===
==== Statistics ====
In 2004, the Lesbian Counseling Center in South Korea (formerly Kirikiri) and the Lesbian Institute for Lesbians (LIFL) ran a research study titled “Research of Actual Condition of Lesbians of South Korea, 2004”. The study was the first of its kind and was intended to be used as a basis for policy development. 561 lesbians were surveyed.

69.3% of lesbians who were surveyed reported having been troubled by sexuality in their teen years. 95% of the surveyed lesbians reported having been in a relationship, most of which occurred for the first time in their teen years also. Due to homophobia they experienced, lesbians experienced difficulties with coming out. They expressed fear of being punished, fired, and stigmatized. Some lesbians expressed threats of being outed, sexual violence, and blackmail. 90.8% of lesbians who were harmed did not seek help from the police. These instances and others brought about mental and emotional difficulties for lesbians in South Korea. Lesbians expressed trouble with hiding relationships, internalized homophobia, and relationships with their families.

The study found:

1. 69.3% of lesbians experienced trouble with their sexual identity as a teenager

2. 74.7% felt pain in their familial relationships

3. 67.4% experienced emotional pain when family or friends expressed homophobia

4. 12.9% of those who expressed discrimination faced sexual violence

==== Kirikiri ====
Kirikiri is the first lesbian rights movement group in South Korea. It formed in November 1994 as a separation from a larger lesbian and gay Korean group, Chodonghoe. A defining event in Kirikiri's history occurred in 2001 when Suk Ja Kang, a representative from the Korean Association of Women's Studies (KAWS) argued in a paper titled “Critical Study of Lesbian Feminism: A Comparison with Korean Women's Experience” that lesbians are an abnormal group in Korean society created as a “product of Western theory” and should be excluded from feminist discourse. The exclusion of lesbians from women's movements was a factor that inspired resistance from Kirikiri members. The homophobia presented in this paper at the Fall Annual Conference compelled Kirikiri to demand KAWS withdraw its claims. However, Kang refused and responded by saying that Kirikiri members should present their opposing thoughts at future conferences.

In addition to experiencing exclusion from the KAWS, Kirikiri faced homophobic backlash from the Korean Foundation for Women (KFW). The KFW refused to authorize funding for Kirikiri claiming that Kirikiri was a "lesbian organization" and as such, could not be considered a "women's organization". Kirikiri was the first lesbian organization to apply for the fund, but the KFW rendered lesbians as sexual minorities but not women. In response, Kirikiri made a public statement. Propelled by the backlash, the Korean Foundation for Women allocated the fund to a sexual minority group three years later in 2005. Kirikiri's resistance brought Korean lesbians out of social erasure. Eventually, Kirikiri changed names. The organization is presently known as the Lesbian Counseling Center in South Korea.

==== Project L(esbian) ====
In 2005, Project L was the first exhibition organized by openly bisexual women and lesbian artists in South Korea. The Project L exhibition was initially supposed to take place at the 2004 Wolgyung Festival. However, a week before the opening, the organizers of the event canceled the exhibition. They claimed that the scope of the exhibition did not fit the theme of that year which was the promotion of “positive images of the natural female body.” Some lesbians and bisexual women who showcased their art opted to limit publicity in art magazines because they feared opposition from other feminist artists in the art community. Project L increased visibility for queer women in Korea, but the fear of social repercussions was still alive. Project L was showcased at Konkuk University where artists were also fearful of homophobic violence from students who attended the university. In 2008, a second exhibition called Gender Spectrum followed Project L.

== See also ==
- LGBTQ rights in South Korea
- LGBTQ history
