= Yishay Garbasz =

Israeli-born interdisciplinary artist based in Berlin

Yishay Garbasz (Hebrew: ישי גרבש; 1970, Israel – March 2026, Berlin) was an interdisciplinary artist who worked in the fields of photography, performance and installation. Her main field of interest was trauma and the inheritance of post-traumatic memory. She also worked on issues of identity and the invisibility of transgender women.

She studied photography with Stephen Shore at Bard College between 2000 and 2004.

Garbasz received the Thomas J. Watson Fellowship in 2004/2005. She had lived in Berlin since 2005, and had also lived in Taiwan, Thailand, Japan, Korea, Israel, The United States and England.

Despite having suffered epoxy poisoning in 2014, from which she developed occupational asthma and chronic lung problems, she was also Germany's first trans woman triathlete. Garbasz learned to write at the age of 25 at Landmark College. She was openly lesbian.

== Notable works ==
2004–2009

In her piece In my Mother's Footsteps the artist explores her inherited traumatic memories from her mother's Holocaust experiences. For the project, the artist visited every single place her mother's life touched during that period. The project consisted of an exhibition (Tokyo Wonder Site, 2009, Wako Works of Art, 2009, and Busan Biennale 2010) and a book. This book was nominated for the German photo book prize in 2009. As of June 2017, the project had never been shown in Germany.

2008–2010

In her project Becoming, Garbasz explores her own body and the changes in her body one year before to one year after her gender affirmation surgery through the creation of a human-scale zoetrope. That project was also a flip book published in 2010 by Mark Batty Publisher. The project was also included in the Busan Biennale 2010. She was awarded the Berlin Woman Filmmaker of the Year award for this.

2010

In "Eat Me Damien," Garbasz looks and pokes fun at the predatory practices of both the art world and world commerce. In this work the artist puts her testicles removed during gender clarification surgery in a fish tank with formaldehyde, reminiscent of Damien Hirst's shark. Shown at Seven at Miami Art Fair. Garbasz had stated that she always planned to use the genitals in some way, and that this particular idea won out due to its title.

2011

In the Number Project Garbasz brands herself with the Auschwitz number of her mother. In the same location and size, she photographed her arm as well as herself over the month as the flesh almost heals. This is a social project looking to link the number after her mother's death to daily life in order to create a link with the past and not lose something that was forming in her mother's life.

2014

Ritual and Reality explores the trauma from the nuclear catastrophe in Fukushima. Color photographs and videos (each a 9 to 12 minute single take) are accompanied by an audio guide that describes Garbasz's three-week journey through the Fukushima exclusion zone in 2013 as well as the more general consequences of the nuclear disaster.

2015

Severed Connections: Do what I say or they will kill you is an exploration of how fences as physical barriers create fear that allows governments to manipulate their people. This work was exhibited at the Ronald Feldman Gallery in New York in 2015. It centers around her travels to Korea, Belfast, and the West Bank where warring groups' close proximity is only separated by such barriers. She used a combination of photography, video, and sculpture for the exhibition. In an interview Garbasz said that the fences are about "othering" and that "the less contact you have, the easier it is to make the other a monster", hearkening back to her personal struggles as a trans woman.
