= Transgender personnel in the South Korean military =

Sexuality in the South Korean military

Transgender personnel in the South Korean military refers to the policies and issues surrounding the service of transgender individuals in the armed forces of South Korea. Military service is mandatory for most male citizens, making legal gender classification a key factor in determining eligibility.

Currently, transgender women are excluded from military service and are generally classified as unfit for duty under existing regulations. Transgender men may be subject to conscription depending on their legal gender status and medical history.

The issue has drawn public attention through cases such as Byun Hui-su, whose discharge in 2020 prompted debate over military policy and transgender rights in South Korea.

== History ==
=== Transgender individuals in South Korean society ===
Transgender self-identification visibly emerged in the 2000s after Korean singer Harisu publicly came out as a transgender woman. Although there was a dramatic emergence in the 2000s, transgender identity can be traced back to the 1950s. In earlier history, transgender identity was referred to as yeojangnamja, which translates to "men in women's clothes", and jungseong, which translates to "gender neutral".

=== Resident Registration System ===
The Resident Registration System establishes three parts of a citizen's legal identification: their birthday, place of origin, and gender. Gender is a binary code of 1 and 3, indicating male, or 2 and 4, indicating female. Individuals who have transitioned can petition to have their number changed. Those who are unable to change their legal gender and ID number can face problems, such as finding work and accessing services.

In 2013, a court ruled that transgender individuals did not need to have sex reassignment surgeries to legally change their gender. During this time, requests by transgender individuals to change their Family Register number to reflect their gender were filed. However, few were actually granted.

Previously, transgender individuals who wished to legally change their gender had to provide proof they were unmarried, did not have minor children, and had parental consent, regardless of their age. However, on November 24, 2022, the South Korean Supreme Court ruled that having minor children is no longer a valid reason to deny an individual a legal sex status change.

Another step in legal gender change is a medical and psychological examination. Courts rely almost exclusively on this examination to proceed with the change. Medical examinations and treatment are not covered by health insurance, and few facilities offer specific treatment for transgender people. This creates barriers for transgender individuals who do not have enough money to pay for examinations or gender affirming surgery.

=== Policies (Article 92-6) ===
South Korea does not allow same sex couples to marry or adopt children, and there are no laws that prevent workplace discrimination or hate crimes against LGBT+ individuals. Additionally, the South Korean military criminalizes same-sex relations. Section 6 of Article 92 in the Korean Military Penal Code considers sex acts that occur between two individuals of the same gender to be molestation, even with consent, and is punishable for up to two years. The South Korean Constitutional Court reviewed Article 92 in 2002 and 2011 and found its content to be constitutional. The South Korean government supports Article 92 in that it maintains discipline among the predominantly male military. Article 92-6 does not explicitly reference transgender people. However, this policy has the potential to impact transgender individuals who have yet to have gender reassignment surgery (GRS). For example, a heterosexual transgender women who hasn't had GRS.

In 2005, eight soldiers were discharged for being gay. In cases like these, sexuality is determined by doctor diagnosis and testimony from fellow soldiers. In 2017, 32 men were charged with sodomy after military authorities began an investigation to crack down on "homosexual activities" amongst soldiers. This included the use of Article 92–6 to sentence two male soldiers who had sex while off-base and off-duty. However, in April 2022, the Supreme Court reversed their convictions on the grounds that criminalizing same-sex acts that occur off-base and off-duty would deny the soldiers their "rights to nondiscrimination, equality, dignity... and [pursuit of] happiness."

== Transgender individuals in the military ==
Service in the South Korean military became mandatory for all male citizens in 1949. Because South Korea is technically still at war with North Korea, attempts to end mandatory military service continue to be denied. According to cultural anthropologist Timothy Gitzen, this is called a "Cold War binary." As of 2019, men ages 18 to 35 must spend a minimum of 21 months in active duty.

=== Body examinations ===
At age 19, male citizens have their bodies closely examined by the Military Manpower Administration (MMA). The physical and psychological examination work together to determine how "suitable" an individual is for military service. Historically, the MMA has accused individuals of identifying as transgender in order to evade conscription. Some physicians suspected individuals were claiming to be transgender in order to be exempt from active duty. They reportedly asked these individuals to undergo surgical procedures, such as an orchiectomy.

The Draft Physical Examination in 1978 introduced "sexual perversion," later called "gender identity disorder," to determine physical and mental disabilities. If trans people have already been examined by medical professionals, they have to provide either a court decision or their entire physical examination report thus far that proves that they are, in fact, transgender.

=== Transgender women ===
Conscription into the military is determined by the gender code within an individual's Resident Registration Number (RRN). Transgender women who have not legally changed their RRN will be conscripted into the military to serve as "men".

Due to the high cost of surgeries, many trans women cannot be exempt by way of legal gender change. Another way to gain exemption from active duty is to be diagnosed with "severe gender identity disorder" by a military doctor. This "disorder" is classified as either mild or severe. Because the MMA has previously charged women with identifying as transgender in order to evade conscription, several transgender women report feeling compelled to "undergo irreversible surgeries," such as an orchiectomy, which is the removal of the testicles. Between 2012 and 2015, 104 transgender women were exempt based on "testicle loss" and only 21 transgender women were exempt from service based on gender identity disorder.

Trans women serving as "men" are assigned to second eligible conscription status, also known as de facto exemption, in the military.

Byun Hui-su was a transgender woman who transitioned during her time in the South Korean military. On January 22, 2020, she was discharged after undergoing gender reassignment surgery. In March 2021, the 23-year-old was found dead in her home. The South Korean court later found this discharge to be unlawful and discriminatory. The court made no further remarks about transgender individuals serving in the military.

=== Transgender men ===
Transgender men are not required to undergo a physical examination and are automatically exempt from active duty as the MMA considers them "disabled and impaired." Under Article 136 of the Enforcement Decree of the Military Service Act, they are assigned to the second eligible conscription status which is reserved for individuals such as convicts and orphans. A transgender man who has not changed his legal gender will still be considered a "female," will not be conscripted, and is barred from volunteering to serve as a "man" in the military.
