= Paula Grossman =

Advocate and plaintiff in gender-affirming care lawsuit

- Paula Grossman, from a 1971 newspaper
- Born: October 30, 1919; Brooklyn, New York, U.S.
- Died: September 26, 2003 (aged 83); New Jersey, U.S.
- Occupations: Educator, activist

Paula Miriam Grossman (October 30, 1919 – September 26, 2003) was an American music educator who was dismissed from a teaching position in Bernards Township, New Jersey, after gender-affirming surgery in 1971. Grossman unsuccessfully sued the school district on the basis of sex discrimination, but her case garnered international media attention. She lectured and published on her experience, including in her 1979 book A Handbook for Transsexuals.

== Early life ==
Grossman was born to Bertha and Henry Grossman in Brooklyn on October 30, 1919. She was assigned male at birth. Grossman graduated from the University of Newark in 1941, and served in the United States Army during World War II. In 1947, she earned a master's degree in music education at Teachers College, Columbia University.

== Career ==
Grossman was a schoolteacher for over thirty years. She taught music at an elementary school in Bernards Township, New Jersey, from 1957 until 1971. After her spring 1971 gender-affirming surgery, she returned to the classroom, and met with her principal and the school board of the Bernards Township School District to discuss her continued employment as a woman. The district asked Grossman to relinquish her tenure and transfer to a high school position. She refused those conditions, and she was suspended from her employment before the 1971–1972 academic year.

In October 1971, the ACLU agreed to work with Grossman to fight her dismissal. Nonetheless, the state education commissioner ordered her dismissal, and a judge found that the firing did not meet a strict definition of sex discrimination, in Grossman v. Bernards Township Board of Education. The decision was upheld on appeal in 1974. The United States Supreme Court declined to hear the case in 1976. In a later decision, her right to a disability pension was recognized.

Grossman never taught school again; she performed as a pianist and singer. She lectured on the case and her experiences, and appeared on national television programs covering the controversy of her dismissal, including The David Suskind Show. "I've done nothing wrong, nothing disgraceful," she told Rutgers students at a lecture in 1973. "I had a medical problem and I had it solved. Some people didn't like the solution." By 1977 she was working for the City of Plainfield as an assistant planner. She later wrote an advice book, A Handbook for Transsexuals (1979). She retired in 1980.

One of Grossman's students in New Jersey was Meryl Streep. Another former student, Scott Keeler, wrote a newspaper essay on Grossman in 2007, for the Tampa Bay Times, recalling that "educators and adults in my community, including my own father, let pass the opportunity to teach tolerance and acceptance, and everyone was the worse for it."

== Personal life ==
In 1949, Grossman married Ruth Keshen, a legal secretary. They had three daughters, and stayed together until Grossman died in 2003 at age 83. Ruth Keshen Grossman died in 2005.
