= Sa Pangji =

Korean intersex person (fl. 15th century)

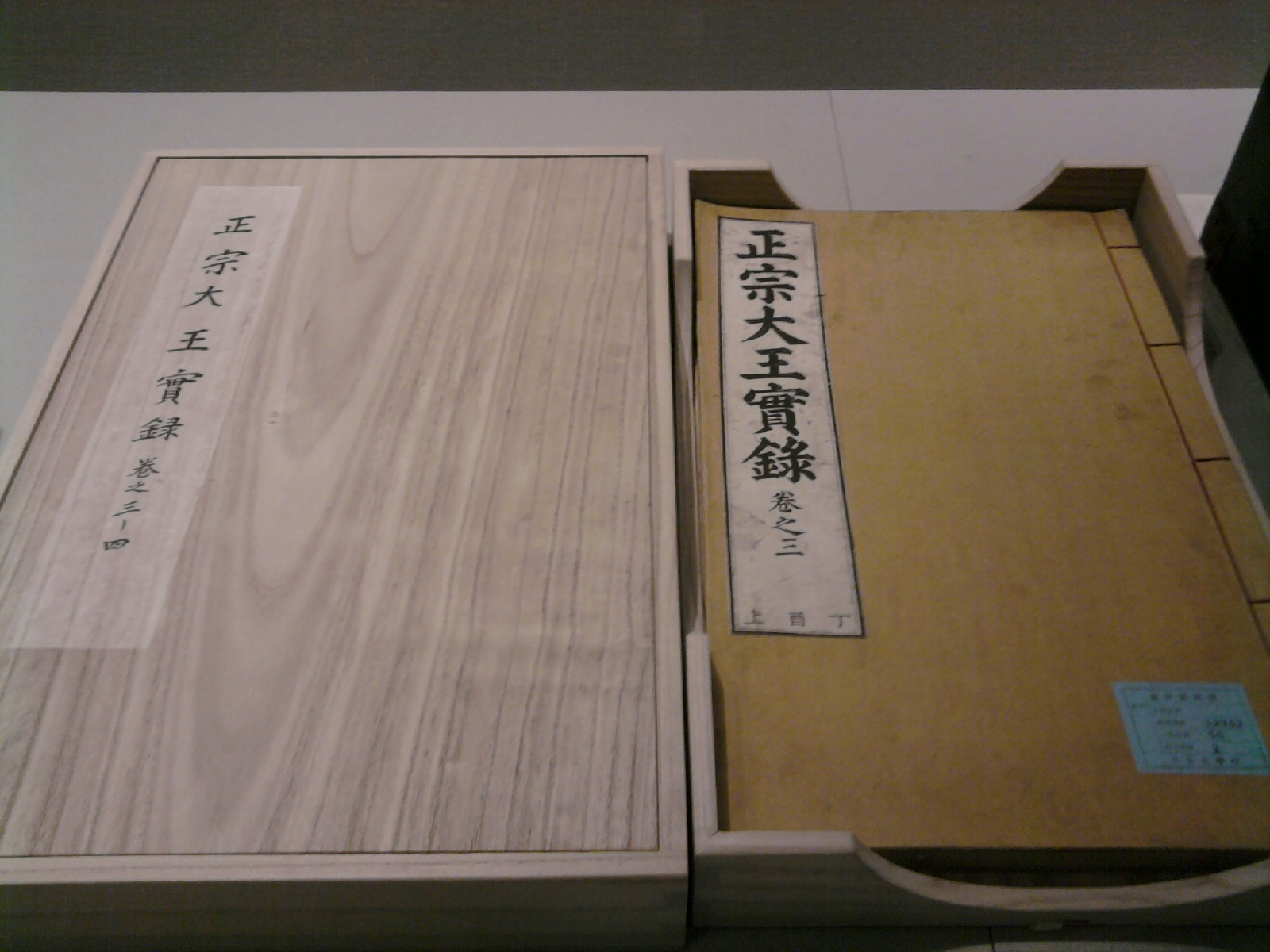
Veritable Records of the Joseon Dynasty - Sillok in its case at the University of Seoul

Sa Pangji (Korean: 사방지; Hanja: 舍方知) was a Korean intersex person during the Joseon period.

== Biography ==
Sa Pangji had hypospadias and reared as a feminine gender role. Sa learned sewing from her mother. Sa Pangji had sexual relationships with widows and Bhikkhunis. In 1462, the Veritable Records of the Joseon Dynasty recorded that Sa Pangji, a slave, had an affair with a widowed noblewoman.

== Cultural depictions ==
A film based on Pangji's life was produced in South Korea in 1988 named Sa Bangji.

== See also ==
- Im Seong-gu
