= M.T. v. J.T. =

- Court: New Jersey Superior Court (Appellate Division)
- Full case name: M.T., PLAINTIFF-RESPONDENT, v. J.T., DEFENDANT-APPELLANT.
- Decided: March 22, 1976

Court membership
- Judges sitting: Alan B. Handler, Carton, Crahay

Case opinions
- Decision by: Alan B. Handler

Keywords
- spousal support; transsexualism; marriage

M.T. v J.T., 140 N.J. 77, 355 A.2d 204, 205 (NJ Super. Ct. 1976), is a 1976 New Jersey Superior Court case which affirmed the validity of a marriage between a post-operative trans woman to a cissexual man, and in particular recognized the plaintiff changed legal sex from male to female. This case is believed to be the first to address the right of transsexual people to marry.

In 1972, M.T. filed the lawsuit claiming spousal support after her husband of two years, J.T., abandoned her and ceased providing financial support. A three-judge panel of the Superior Court's Appellate Division affirmed the holding of the lower court that M.T. was legally female for the purposes of New Jersey law at the time of the marriage, and therefore the marriage was valid, and that M.T. was entitled to support. This opinion based its reasoning in part on the fact that M.T. had undergone sexual reassignment surgery. The court considered, but rejected, the arguments of the earlier English case Corbett v Corbett, which had ruled that English marriage laws follow birth sex.

== See also ==
- Void marriage
