= Im Seong-gu =

Korean intersex person (fl. 16th century)

Im Seong-gu (Korean: 임성구지; fl. 16th century) was a Korean intersex person from the early Joseon period, whose life is recorded in the Veritable Records of the Joseon Dynasty.

== Biography ==
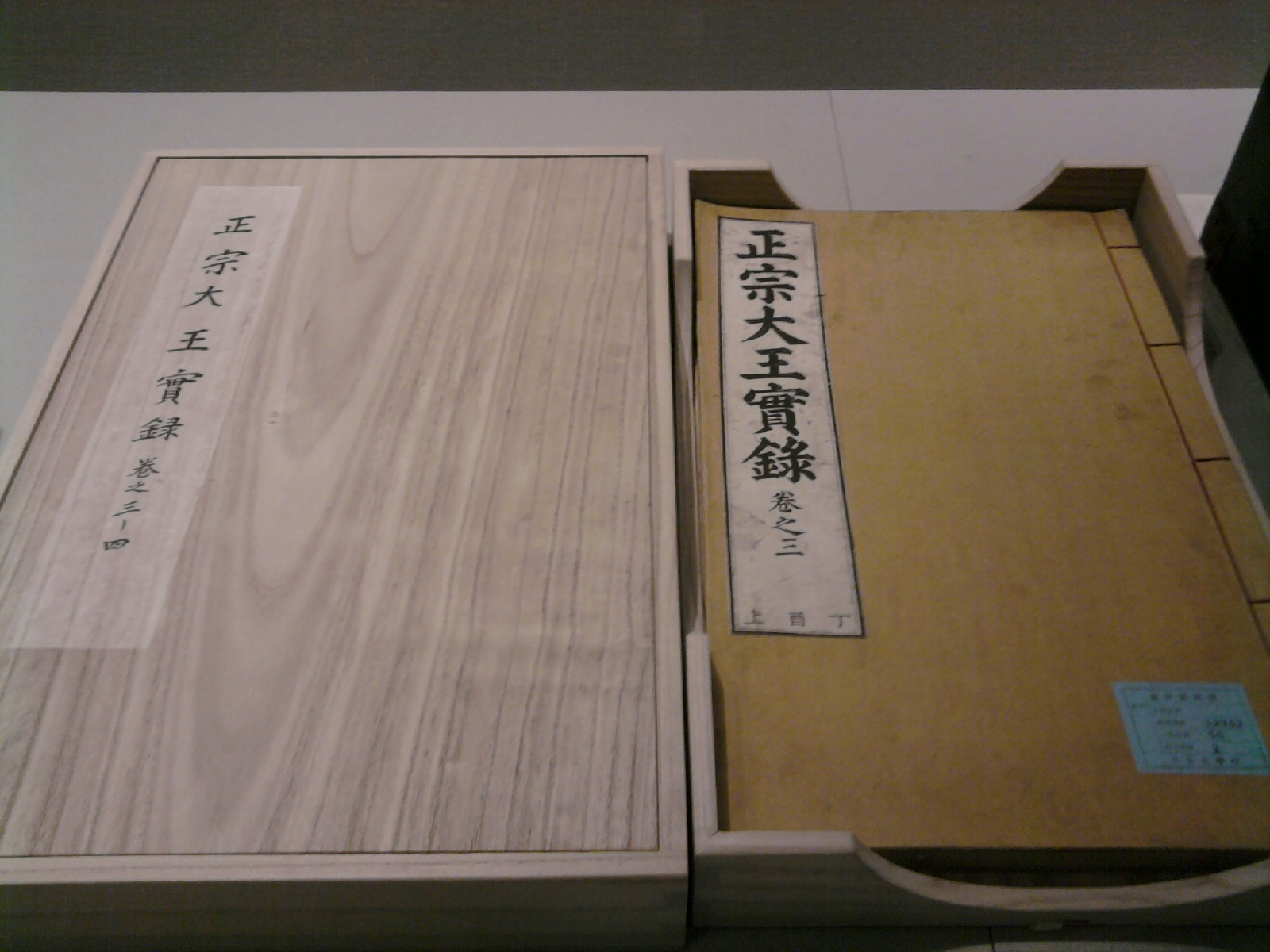
Veritable Records of the Joseon Dynasty - Sillok in its case at the University of Seoul

The dates of Im Seong-gu's life are unknown, but part of it is recorded in the Veritable Records of the Joseon Dynasty, in Book 8 - the Veritable Records of Seonjo (Revised). In the annals, Im Seong-gu is referred to as a "man from Gilju", who married a man and a woman. It also discusses how they were full of both ying and yang, which expressed itself through their gender. They were raised as a girl, and later married, but the husband was shocked to see their body on the wedding night. They later re-married to a woman.

In 1548, the Joseon court decided that Im Seong-gu was disturbing society and exiled them. The Saganwon (사간원), the opposition to the monarchy, insisted that Im Seong-gu should be executed. However King Myeongjong of Joseon forbade execution, stating that exile was enough. The annals discussed whether they should be killed, like other similar people in India. They also describes how Im Seong-gu wore both typically masculine and typically feminine clothes.

== Historiography ==
An alternative interpretation of the Veritable Records describes Im Seong-gu as a bisexual man.

== See also ==
- Sa Bangji
