= Bobby Noble (academic) =

- Occupations: Author, professor
- Employer: York University
- Known for: Transgender studies

Bobby Noble, aka Jean Bobby Noble or J. Bobby Noble, is a professor at York University in Toronto, Ontario, Canada. He is the author of the books Masculinities Without Men? and Sons of the Movement and is one of the foremost scholars of transgender studies in North America.

== Works ==
Books

- Noble, Jean Bobby (2003). Masculinities without men?: female masculinity in twentieth-century fictions. Vancouver: UBC Press. ISBN 9780774809979.
- Noble, Bobby (2006). Sons of the movement: FtMs risking incoherance on a post-queer cultural landscape. Toronto: Women's Press. ISBN 9781435604131.

Chapters in books

- Noble, Bobby (2004), "Queer pedagogies of the closet: teaching ignorances in the heteronormative classroom", in Prince, Althea; Silva-Wayne, Susan (eds.), Feminisms and womanisms: a women's studies reader, Toronto: Women's Press, ISBN 9780889614116.

Journal articles

- Noble, Bobby (January 2014). "Porn's pedagogies: teaching porn studies in the academic–corporate complex". Porn Studies. 1 (1–2): 96–113. doi:10.1080/23268743.2013.863658.
