= Nagwon-dong =

Neighborhood in Seoul, South Korea

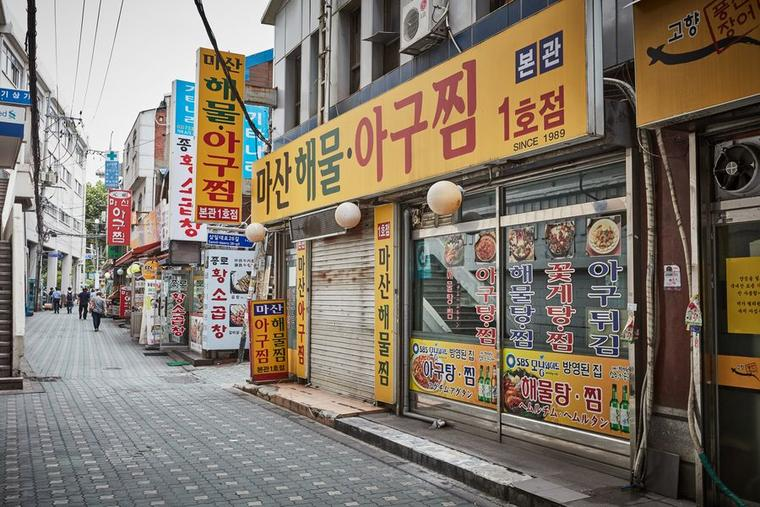
- Nagwon-dong Agujjim Street
- Interactive map of Nagwon-dong
- Country: South Korea

Area
  - Total: 0.07 km^{2} (0.027 sq mi)

Korean name
- Hangul: 낙원동
- Hanja: 樂園洞
- RR: Nagwon-dong
- MR: Nagwŏn-dong

Nagwon-dong (Korean: 낙원동) is a dong (neighbourhood) of Jongno District, Seoul, South Korea. Nagwon means "paradise" in Korean. It is a legal dong (법정동) administered under its administrative dong (행정동), Jongno 1, 2, 3, 4 ga-dong.

== Attractions ==
=== Nagwon Instrument Arcade ===
Nagwon Instrument Arcade has traditionally been Korea's largest collection of music stores and is very close to Insa-dong. Built in 1968, the Nagwon building is a pillar-based, mixed-use complex. On the first floor, is a four lane road and a market below. Above the shopping area, there are apartments. The second and third floors of the Nagwon building has a few hundred music stores clustered together. Various instruments and other music-related equipment such as amps, speakers and karaoke machines can be found there. There are people there to sell or repair instruments for beginners and experts alike. On the fourth floor, there is a theater that used to premiere films and was called the 'Hollywood Theater'. It has become the 'Seoul Art Cinema' and 'dance musical private theater' which play 'Silver Theater' films for senior citizens, independent films, and other specialty films.

== See also ==
- Administrative divisions of South Korea
