= Michael Kantaras =

American transgender man (born 1959)

Michael John Kantaras (born March 26, 1959) is an American trans man who was involved in a high-profile child custody case with his ex-wife. The case had implications for the legal status of transsexual marriages and the legal definitions of "man" and "woman."

== Background ==
Kantaras was born in Youngstown, Ohio. In the late 1980s, Kantaras underwent hormone treatments and two surgeries at the Rosenberg Clinic in Texas to remove breasts, ovaries, and the uterus, but retained external female genitalia. Kantaras married Linda Forsythe in a civil ceremony on July 18, 1989, in Holiday, Florida. Kantaras adopted Forsythe's child from a prior relationship, and Forsythe gave birth to a second child through artificial insemination in 1992.

Kantaras met another woman and filed for divorce in 1998, requesting primary custody of the children. The divorce was finalized in 1999.

Kantaras won his custody case in 2003, following a three-week hearing that featured medical experts who testified that Kantaras should be considered a man. Kantaras was represented by Collin Vause, an attorney for the National Center for Lesbian Rights. Florida Circuit Court Judge Gerard O'Brien ruled that Kantaras was legally male and had a valid marriage.

However, the decision was reversed on appeal in 2004 by the Florida Second District Court of Appeal which upheld Forsythe's claim that the marriage was null and void because her ex-husband was still a woman and same-sex marriages were illegal in Florida. Review was denied by the Florida Supreme Court. The couple settled the case with joint custody of their teenage children in 2005.
