= Feminism in Thailand =

Feminism in Thailand is perpetuated by many of the same traditional feminist theory foundations, though Thai feminism is facilitated through a medium of social movement activist groups within Thailand's illiberal democracy. The Thai State claims to function as a civil society with an intersectionality between gender inequality and activism in its political spheres.

In the Thai state, feminist activism is pivotal upon class structures, which focus on specific facets of public policy based on a woman's socioeconomic status. The hierarchy of a feminist's issue lies in one's class social strata. The Thai elite focusing on public policy, social equality, and increase in women's presence within economic confines. The younger Thai generation is depicted as less concerned with their public policy and formal politics; while middle class feminist Thai women express their political concerns through more antiquated and traditional mediums such as artistic performances and published works.

== History of the Thai women’s movement ==
=== 1920s ===
- In 1927, for the first time in Thai history, seven female students were admitted to Chulalongkorn University.

=== 1930s ===
- In 1932 Thai women gained the right to vote, the first of Asian countries to grant suffrage to women.
- Three of the seven original women admitted to Chulalongkorn University graduated with the first female BA in Medicine.

=== 1940s ===
- Orapin Chaiyakan is the first woman elected to a post in the Parliament of Thailand, on June 5, 1949 Chaiyakan was elected as member of the House of Representatives of Thailand of The National Assembly of the Kingdom of Thailand.

=== 1950s ===
• The rights of a wife to matrimonial property management were imposed.

=== 1960s ===
- While under the military dictatorship in the 1960s, a group of upper class, educated Thai women began to address Thai public policy facets which were inequitable, beginning with family law. This initial upper-class women's movement was contributed as a continuation of a less publicized law reform movement in the 1950s where women activist focused on issues which entailed the rights of a wife to matrimonial property management and the impeding of males who double registered their marriages. In tandem with the upper-class women's policy concerns, the 1960s Thai Student's Movement emerged along with women's groups at Thammasat University. These students focused on 'building women's consciousness' while gaining public attention through book publishing and protesting.
- The women's groups during this time period also participated in the People's Movement (in lieu of the fact that many men were involved in activism and protests). The People's Movement played a quintessential role in the 1973 student uprising anti-military demonstrations in Bangkok (now enshrined in the memories of Thai people as hok tulaa) which aided in the Thai State becoming an 'unstable democracy' beginning in 1973. This 1973 movement was highly publicized though the platform of feminist journalists, alongside the academic, professional, and public institutions of its time. See-History of Thailand (1973–2001)

=== 1970s ===
- Feminism in the 1970s in the Thai state gained momentum through the 1974 constitutional change of an Equal Rights Protection Law. The Equal Rights Protection Law was the first in Thai history to focus on women's issues and gender equality. This law was a foundational step towards the proliferation of women's groups in the Thai State. In 1976 there was a right-wing backlash against the Thai People's Movement and women's groups from students in Thammasat University. The army and right-wing organization "The Scouts" spread propaganda that the pro-democratic liberal Thammasat University students were communists who would lead to the downfall of Thailand as they were 'working with the underground'. In October 1976 'The Scouts' engulfed Thammasat University and began to open fire on the university's grounds. Though Thai police were present, it is said that the police were of no aid to the seventy activists who were killed, hidden, and buried. Women's group participants were raped, sexually mutilated, and buried alive. After this backlash against Thailand's unstable democracy the Thai state defaulted back to its past dictatorship rule, with many who participated in 'The Scout's' organization fled to the forest to become 'guerrillas'.

=== 1980s ===
- Throughout the late 1970s to early 1980s Thailand began to shift away from communism due to the lack of support from China. This shift away from hierarchical structures facilitated a political climate which would become The International Women's Decade 1975-1985. This political movement paved the way for the foundation of women's studies programs, and in 1985 the elimination of many governmental forms of discrimination against women.
- The 1980s also brought a rise in a higher ratio of women to men in tertiary education.

=== 1990s ===
- The 1990s feminist movement focused on political equality between genders. In 1992 Thai activists participated in Operation Black, a peaceful protest by which the people help demonstrations against Thailand's 1992 ‘illegitimate’ Prime Minister.

=== 2000s ===
- Thailand outlawed marital rape in 2007.
- In 2011 the Thai state appointed Yingluck Shinawatra as the first female and 28th Prime Minister. Yingluck Shinawatra won by the majority vote of 265 of 500 parliament seats (52% of the votes). She was removed from office on 7 May 2014 by a controversial Constitutional Court decision.

== Thai Buddhist Feminist Theory ==
The conceptualization of Thai Buddhist Feminist Theory is founded upon feminist activists who seek to find spiritual rejuvenation. Participating in mediation while practicing mindful eating habits Thai Buddhist Feminist activists Ouyporn Khuankaew and Ginger Norwood pay specific attention to breathing techniques while taking action in local communities through the facilitation of workshops which aid refugees, victims of sexual violence, and the rejuvenation of other women's organization directors. Through the communication between activist Thai women Khuankaew believes that change will take place. In one interview Khuankaew states, 'Sometimes, women who come to the retreats are so overwhelmed by the trauma they have witnessed that listening to each other is very difficult. I tell them that listening is a form of meditation. Mediation does not only involve watching and letting go of your own mind—getting lost in a space separate from other people. Mediation can also include being a witness, seeing each other as survivors, as activists, as mothers and visionaries. Deep listening is a skill we practice together'

== Activism and movements ==
- International Women's Partnership for Peace and Justice (IWP) is a feminist grassroots organization which aims to support activism in Thailand amongst other Asian regions. Focused on community, spirituality, sustainability, and support of progressive local movements. The IWP serves as a retreat center for community peace groups, with facilities which include mediation rooms, libraries, and guest facilities. According to the IWP's website the organization's foundation encompasses three core principles: feminism, social activism, and spiritual practice.'
- The Association for the Promotion of the Status of Women (APSW) was founded in 1974 as an emergency home in Bangkok, Thailand. Providing women and children with food, mental health assistance, and temporary shelter, the APSW has helped over 50,000 women countrywide. Within the APSW is a Women's Clinic, which was constructed upon 1987 the US$1 million 1987 donation from US President Jimmy Carter and wife Rosalynn Carter. With as many as 20 women in its facility per day, the Women's Clinic focuses on the healthcare and reproductive rights of pregnant women and infant health. In 2003 the APSW opened a Rape Crisis Center- the Kanitnaree Center to provide services to rape victims. Other facilities within the APSW include its Women's Education and Training Center, Youth Center, Teen Training House, and its Gender and Development Research Institute.
- The Foundation for Women (FFW) is a non-governmental organization based out of Bangkok, Thailand. The original establishment manifested in 1984 as Women's Information Center giving advice to Thai women traveling overseas. In 1986 the FFW opened a women's shelter for victims of domestic violence. The FFW focused on providing services such for Thai women such as shelters and education of human rights. In 1988 the FFW began its Kamla project, which centered on educating the Bangkok community on child prostitution and human trafficking. In 1922 the Kamla project reached a national awareness when the FFW's research was printed in the UN Plan of Action Combating the Sale of Children, Child Prostitution and Child Pornography. The FFW continues to aid women and children in the development of advocacy and autonomy in their communities by aiding in volunteer training through community biased work and connecting women to the proper authorities to voice their own opinions to facilitate problem solving and social change. The FFW provides assistance for individuals victim to gender based violence, including sexual and domestic violence. The foundation also participates in campaigning against marital rape and the ‘protection and prevention of the rights of women’. The FFW gains awareness through its proliferation of educational videos, newspapers, and national publications.
- Women Network Reshaping Thailand (WREST) whose website slogan reads 'Reinvent the country's network'. The WREST advocates for the promotion of gender equality and the engagement of Thai women to participate in the government's decision making processes. WREST trains rural women in the education of Thai economy and reform process.

== Sexuality in Thai culture ==
Organizations such as Thailand's Women’s Health Advocacy Foundation focus on Thai women's reproductive rights and sexuality issues based on choice which is a traditional feminist topic. Located in Bangkok, The Women's Health Advocacy Foundation includes research, training of skilled nurses. and hosting of international conferences on the facilitation of safe abortions.

Issues of sexuality are often debated as Thai feminist subject due to an array of sexual preferences within Thai culture. The subject of sexuality is quantified based on an individual's societal class 'norms'. In Chalidaporn Songsamphan's article, "Localizing Feminism: Women’s Voices and Social Activism in Thai Context" Songsamphan (Associate Professor of Political Science at Thammasat University) states that, 'while some Thai feminists do not tolerate commercial sex, others looked at it as a type of work women might choose due to their particular reasons and circumstances.'

== Sex workers and human rights ==
Sex workers in Thailand have been resisting and organizing for decades. In 1985 with support from the Thai activist and women's human rights defender Chantawipa Apisuk they formed their first organization - Empower Foundation. In 2004 a second sex worker organization created by Empower members SWING began. Empower has had a leading role in creating many other networks and organizations to address issues of HIV, migration, political reform, natural disasters e.g. tsunami. Sex workers are often unrecognized in their roles as leaders of Thai feminism and movement building. www.empowerfoundation.org

== Women's studies academic degrees ==
Two institutions in Thailand offer a graduate level Women's Studies degree: Chiangmai University in 2000 and the Women's and Youth Studies Programme in Thammasat University. The first Women' Studies Centre was established in 1981. The Gender and Development Studies (GDS) Field of Study at the Asian Institute of Technology (AIT). According to a Bangkok independent economist, Sethaput Suthiwart-Narueput, by 2020 there will be one million more women than men in Thailand and 'The top 10 faculties of the top 10 universities in Thailand have more women students than male students except for accounting and education.'

== See also ==
- Orapin Chaiyakan
- Prostitution in Thailand
- Women in Thailand
- Gender inequality in Thailand
