= LGBTQ culture in Thailand =

Thailand is widely recognized for its acceptance of gender diversity, particularly with the visibility of LGBTQ identities, including kathoey or "ladyboys". LGBTQ people have a long history in Thai society, influenced by cultural customs, Buddhist teachings, and evolving legal frameworks. While Thailand is often perceived as an LGBTQ-friendly country, social acceptance does not always translate into full legal protections. Anti-discrimination laws have been introduced, but same-sex marriage remains unrecognized under Thai law.

== History of gender and sexuality in Thailand ==
Historically, Thailand had a more fluid understanding of gender, with non-binary and gender-diverse individuals occupying various social roles. However, colonial-era legal reforms and Western influences reshaped societal norms, leading to increased stigmatization of LGBTQ identities.

During the 20th century, LGBTQ visibility in Thailand grew, particularly in urban areas such as Bangkok and Pattaya. The rise of queer entertainment venues and LGBTQ advocacy groups contributed to greater social awareness. In recent years, Pride events and activism have played a crucial role in pushing for equal rights, including legal recognition for same-sex relationships and anti-discrimination protections.

== Thai LGBTQ vocabulary and language ==
The Thai language has unique terms and expressions related to LGBTQ identities, reflecting the community's cultural significance. The term Kathoey traditionally refers to transgender women or effeminate gay men, though its use has evolved over time. Other terms, such as tom (masculine-presenting lesbian) and dee (feminine-presenting lesbian), highlight the complexity of gender identity in Thai society.

Thai LGBTQ slang and colloquialisms also play a significant role in queer social circles. Many of these terms have been popularized through media, particularly in online spaces and television. The use of specific language, such as Phasa Lu, within the LGBTQ community reflects a dynamic relationship between identity and cultural expression.

== LGBTQ representation in Thai media and arts ==
Thai media has played a significant role in shaping public perceptions of LGBTQ identities. Television dramas, particularly the Boys' love (BL) genre, have gained widespread popularity both domestically and internationally. These dramas often romanticize same-sex relationships, contributing to greater visibility of LGBTQ themes. However, critics argue that BL dramas sometimes fail to address real-life struggles faced by LGBTQ individuals.

Beyond entertainment, LGBTQ figures in Thai cinema, music, and literature have helped challenge stereotypes and promote inclusivity. Independent filmmakers and artists have used their platforms to tell more nuanced stories about the experiences of LGBTQ people in Thailand.

== Identity and societal perception ==
Although Thailand is often considered a progressive country for LGBTQ individuals, societal perceptions remain complex. While LGBTQ people can live openly in many parts of Thailand, challenges persist in areas such as workplace discrimination and family acceptance.

The role of kathoey in Thai society has been both celebrated and stigmatized. In some cases, kathoey individuals find opportunities in entertainment and beauty industries, yet they may also face legal and social barriers in other aspects of life.

Recent movements advocating for marriage equality and gender recognition laws signal a shift toward greater acceptance. The push for legal reforms reflects ongoing efforts to align Thailand's reputation for LGBTQ tolerance with actual policy changes that protect and empower the community.

== Legal and political developments ==
In recent years, Thailand has seen increasing advocacy for LGBTQ rights, with various groups pushing for legal reforms. While Thailand does not criminalize same-sex relationships, there is still no legal recognition of same-sex marriage or civil unions. However, in 2022, the Thai government took significant steps toward legalizing same-sex unions by approving a draft bill that would allow same-sex couples to register as civil partners. The bill has yet to pass into law, but it represents progress in the country's evolving stance on LGBTQ rights.

Another key area of legal reform has been gender recognition laws. Transgender individuals in Thailand face difficulties in changing their legal gender on official documents, which can lead to challenges in accessing healthcare, education, and employment. Advocacy groups continue to campaign for policies that would grant transgender people full legal recognition and protections.

== Workplace and economic opportunities ==
The workplace environment for LGBTQ individuals in Thailand varies across different industries. While some multinational corporations and progressive local businesses have adopted inclusive policies, many LGBTQ employees still face discrimination. Surveys have shown that transgender individuals, in particular, experience significant barriers to employment, often being limited to jobs in beauty, entertainment, or informal sectors.

Corporate diversity initiatives have become more common, with major companies implementing policies to support LGBTQ employees. Additionally, organizations such as the Rainbow Sky Association of Thailand work to promote workplace equality and provide resources for LGBTQ individuals seeking employment opportunities.

The tourism industry is another sector where LGBTQ inclusivity plays a role. Thailand is known for being a popular destination for LGBTQ travelers, particularly in cities like Bangkok, Chiang Mai, and Phuket. Businesses catering specifically to LGBTQ tourists, such as bars, clubs, and pride-themed events, contribute to the country's economy and global reputation as an LGBTQ-friendly destination.

== Education and awareness campaigns ==
Educational institutions in Thailand have made gradual progress in addressing LGBTQ issues, but challenges remain. While some universities have implemented policies to support LGBTQ students, including allowing transgender students to wear uniforms that align with their gender identity, there is still widespread bullying and discrimination in primary and secondary schools.

LGBTQ advocacy groups and non-governmental organizations (NGOs) have taken active roles in promoting awareness and education. Programs aimed at training educators on gender diversity and creating inclusive curricula are becoming more prevalent. Campaigns like "Teach for Thailand" have worked to integrate LGBTQ perspectives into educational.
