= Anjaree =

LGBT rights organization

Anjaree (Thai: อัญจารี, romanized: Anchari) was an LGBT rights organization in Thailand. It formed as a lesbian organization in 1986 and has focused on issues such as reforming the words used to refer to same sex desire and campaigning for same sex marriage to be legally recognised. It became dormant around 2015.

== History ==
Anjaree was formed originally in 1986 by a small group of lesbian feminist activists, which included Anjana Suvarnananda and Chanthalak Raksayu. The organization articulated lesbian issues in the women's movement in Thailand and the society at large. Suvarnananda was inspired by her experiences studying in the Netherlands. Anjaree organizers were among the first to organize and host an Asian Lesbian Network in 1990, which gained international attention, especially throughout Asia. Successes included stopping the Rajabhat Institute's discriminatory rules on banning transgender people from enrollment at its institute during 1996 and publicizing the decision by the Ministry of Health not to class homosexuality as a pathological condition. The group then became dormant around 2015.

Anjaree has long campaigned for recognition of same sex marriage in Thailand as in other Asian countries such as Taiwan. In 2019, a legal challenge was made to the Civil and Commercial Code. Anjana Suvarnananda commented to the Thomson Reuters Foundation that if it the challenge failed, there was a "risk that the outdated notion of marriage will persist for a while".

== Semantic issues ==
Anjaree focused on the terminology used to describe same sex desire. Thai psychologists had put people into groups named "rak-tang-pet" (heterosexual) and "rak-ruam-pet" (homosexual). The "katoey" (transgender) is an ancient Thai word, which is also employed to describe camp gay men as well as transgender people and thus is being used in a derogatory way, since it suggests gay men are not real men. To go beyond the traditional categorisation of women as either "tom" (butch) or "dee" (femme), Anjaree activists promoted a new identity category known as "ying rak ying", which translates as simply "women who love women". One of the notable advantages of "ying rak ying" was that it dovetailed with transnational LGBTIQ movements and helped Anjaree to contest local anti-LGBTIQ discourses.

== Awards ==
Anjaree received the Felipa de Souza Award in 1995 from the International Gay and Lesbian Human Rights Commission (now OutRight Action International).

== See also ==
- Women in Thailand
