= Global feminism =

Feminist theory

Global feminism is a feminist theory closely aligned with post-colonial theory and postcolonial feminism. It concerns itself primarily with the forward movement of women's rights on a global scale, with the aim of taking into account the lives of marginalized groups of women and moving away from a westernized view of feminism. Using different historical lenses, moving away from the legacy of colonialism, and taking into account public discourse, media and relevant documents, global feminists adopt global causes and start movements which seek to dismantle what they argue are the currently predominant structures of global patriarchy. This is done by considering feminism from the perspectives of all women and how these views vary depending on a variety of factors such as socioeconomic status, race, ethnicity etc., rather than feminism solely taking the form a group of privileged individuals with westernized ideologies. Global feminism is also known as world feminism and international feminism.

During a seminar hosted at the Harvard Kennedy School in early 2021, Dr. Zoe Marks—a lecturer at the Kennedy School specialising in gender and intersectional inequality and African politics——adapts bell hooks' definition of feminism in relation to her talk on Global Feminism in the 21st Century. She defines global feminism as a “movement to end sexist and gender-based oppression locally and transnationally," (Marks). Addressing the two separate locales, local and transnational, invites people to consider the different experiences one may encounter as according to the social norms, history and culture of a particular area; separate experiences for women placed differently in the social hierarchy.

The three waves of feminism originated in the United States of America and at their origin, revolved around white women belonging to a higher strata of society. Though numerous improvements were implemented through this series of movements, there remained an inherent omission of women of colour and those from differing socio-economic standing (Dixon). These associations have perpetuated over time, wherein our immediate associations with feminism—how it is progressing as a whole, how the average woman is treated in a domestic sphere, in the workforce, their role in contributing to society, etc.—are linked to white women of the Western world. Whenever progress through a feminist lens is discussed, legislation and developments in Western nations are the primary focus and marker of modern feminism. This fails to accommodate the varied social and cultural climates of women in other parts of the world.

Parallel to transnational feminism is Third world feminism, that specifically considers the experiences of women in developing and underdeveloped nations. In her journal, Reclaiming Third World Feminism: or Why Transnational Feminism Needs Third World Feminism, Ranjoo Seodu Herr claims that Third World feminism "ought to be reclaimed to promote inclusive and democratic feminisms that accommodate diverse and multiple feminist perspectives of Third World women on the ground," (Herr). In order to make progress at a global scale and move towards a level foundation—in terms of access and opportunity, power and protection—those who are lagging behind should be prioritised first.

Pervasive and dominant across the entirety of the globe, the patriarchy is an inherent structure that plays a role in all women's lives. Activism and awareness has made a positive impact in unpacking this pattern in Western nations. However, developing societies wherein a strict code of behaviour for women directed by misogynistic belief systems were, and still are, strongly present are often overlooked when modern feminism is examined. Two historical examples Global Feminists might use to expose patriarchal structures at work in colonised groups or societies are mediaeval Spain (late eleventh to thirteenth centuries) and nineteenth-century Cuba. The former example concerns women of the Mudejar communities of Islamic Spain and the strict sexual codes through which their social activity was regulated. Mudejar women could be sold into slavery as a result of sexual activity with a Christian man; this was to escape the deemed punishment. Because of their simultaneous roles as upholding one's family honour and one of "conquered status and gender", "Mudejar women suffered double jeopardy in their sexual contact with Christians [in Spain]". As the world's communities become increasingly interconnected, addressing varied social and cultural climates without further perpetuating unequal power structures becomes vital.

Moreover, nineteenth-century Cuba may be explored as an example of colonialism and neocolonialism working in tandem in a slave-based society to affect women's lives under patriarchy, where Cuba "remained a Spanish colony while enduring a neocolonial relationship with the United States".[1] Havana, a city noted for its "absence of the female form", had, "of all the major cities in the West...the most strict social restrictions on the female portion of its population".[1] Upper-class Cuban women were "a constant visual reminder of the separation between elite white society and the people of colour they ruled".[1] It is important to consider that multiple femininities may be enacted and exist even at a local level. Divergence in race, economic standing, gender identity, marital status and cultural contexts all alter the opportunity and access offered to those who may originate from the same area.

== Transnational mothering ==
Forced commitment to double shifts, struggle for individual autonomy, and blurring the private and public sphere of labour are all additional concerns to the primary issue for migrant women. Wealth disparity skews significantly the access of women, and more so mothers, to the right to motherhood. The phenomena of motherhood in a transnational and contemporary time creates structural constraints for migrant women. In juggling their careers—that often stretch to encompass their whole day—alongside their children and labour at home, which is regularly overlooked by their families, immigrant mothers are subject to upholding almost impossible standards. Abusive employers and intimate violence is not the only problem these women have to face, but there are structural issues regarding the right to motherhood in this transnational era. Women immigrants leave their chance overseas at an idealised motherhood of watching their children grow up while performing their gender role, and deport to be the breadwinner. The restructuring of care from the effects of globalisation and neoliberalism institutionalises these women. The double standard and multiple expectations imposed upon them from first their cultural background and second the Western ideal of the working woman—both coming after their need for economic stability and role of managing their households—leave these women scrambling to survive.

Globalisation is constantly changing and as a result it is supporting the phenomena of women in the global south migrating to developed countries to serve as domestic labourers. The role of transnational mothering within a neoliberal spectrum affects the exploitation of women through the deprivation of their citizen rights, by extracting the benefits of immigrant's labour while minimising or eliminating any obligations, whether social or fiscal to the society or state. Migrant women of Third World countries are not drawn from their countries to the advancing economy of the First World, rather drawn from their economies that have been disrupted and distorted by Western colonial incursions, leaving many to be torn free of their roots and recruited to countries to fill its non permanent labour needs, preventing competition with native workers; fulfilling the complementary void. Transnational mothering is viewed as an accommodation for both classes.

Motherhood, along with reproductive freedom and marriage, is the fundamental right of women but is prohibited by nations that justify foreign domestic services, as much as view immigrant women as a threat to its nationalism. Nations create a process of racial formation through which women of different national and racial identities experience discrepant integration within a society, ultimately contributing to hierarchies of citizenship. In relation to social Darwinism, natives believe that Third World migrants "just can't make it", and fear degeneration, thus nations try to weed out those who do not fit the upper or middle class society in ways such as sterilisation; e.g.; black women are identified as devious, immoral, domineering, sexually promiscuous, and bad mothers, resulting in their reproductive rights being threatened by regulation. Transnational mothering sees the disparity between the comfort of a Western woman in a Western country, with all the tools she requires at her disposal to live a healthy life, support her family and raise her children while maintaining a healthy work-life balance, while Third World migrants—who are integral to the Westerner's ability to live with ease—struggle to experience in a healthy capacity at both their workplaces or in terms of raising their children and leading a regular domestic life. Global feminism and Third World feminism wish to not only address and make known these power structures existing throughout the world but dismantle them in order to reach an era where all women, regardless of race, wealth, nationality, etc. have equal opportunity and limited—ideally none—patriarchal oppression.

Additionally, as Western feminism began to make contact with the global south, many women objected to the most radical strands of its ideology that demonised marriage, motherhood, and men. The relationship between motherhood and women's movements has led to the advent of Motherism, coined by the creator Catherine Acholonu as "an Afrocentric alternative to feminism".^{[1]}In some parts of Africa, radical Western feminism was seen as an unhelpful imposition that did not align with the realities of African women's lives. Motherism was meant to bring inclusion to a movement that was seen as polarising. This split in view points is one that must be accounted for in Global feminism, as the women of the Third World and those of developed nations will not see eye to eye in this sense, as according to their level of education, access to work opportunities and general societal beliefs regarding marital status and the birthing of children.

== Global Feminism in East Asia ==
Many of the feminist movements in East Asia have been empowered by global, rights-based feminism from organizations like the UN and their international treaty CEDAW to make national changes in their own countries. Taking a human rights approach, as the UN aims to, allowed Japanese feminists to push for the Equal Employment Opportunity Law (1985) and the Basic Law for a Gender Equal Society (1999) to be enacted. Similarly, Korean activists experienced further gains in gender equity after joining the UN in 1991, and the advent of the Beijing Declaration. Many of these gains came from Korean democratization and the election of a progressive government in the 1990s, but the changing international norms surrounding women's rights were also a factor. On the other hand, a backlash to women's rights movements around the globe is likely to facilitate backsliding in the same way.

Many East Asian countries participated in the #MeToo Movement, including Japan, China, South Korea, and the Philippines.^{[3]}While the movement was started by an American activist, its online nature helped it to spread and become truly global. Even despite the widespread censorship of social media in China, the movement grew, albeit largely limited to university students.^{[4]} The risks associated with speaking out against men in powerful positions and their corresponding punishments are much more severe in Asian countries. Thankfully, the barrier created through the online platforms used during the #MeToo Movement allowed women belonging to these nations to freely speak out with a lower degree of fear surrounding the otherwise taboo topic.

=== Women's Movements in Thailand ===
Women's movements in Thailand are often regarded with suspicion by the government because of their associations with Western feminism, which is considered antithetical to Thai values. Despite this, Thai women created many women's groups such as the Women's Association of Siam and professional groups like The Woman Lawyers Association of Thailand. In the 70s, Thailand's conservative government attempted to shut down many feminist organizations, which consequently found refuge in Western universities. One of the main issues that brings Thai feminism to the global stage however is the country's sex work industry. Sex workers trying to organize in the 1970s and 80s were suppressed by the government, which wanted to have more control over what was perceived as a problematic industry. Feminist NGOs who came together to solve these issues saw sex work largely from a middle-class viewpoint, construing the workers as victims of the patriarchy and the economy's globalization. This is a pervasive part of sex work activism in all countries, with many people divided over helping workers in an industry they see as fundamentally problematic. In response to these attitudes, Thai activists have come together to organize EMPOWER, an organization that seeks to provide useful services for sex workers rather than trying to pull them out of the industry. EMPOWER aims to provide services such as English lessons, health services and education, and career workshops. These initiatives help to combat issues that sex workers themselves report to be concerned about, such as contracting HIV/AIDS. This is a real and present concern because of Thailand's past outbreaks, and the fact that male clients will sometimes remove condoms (a practice known as stealthing), or the condoms may tear or be negotiated away before sex.

== Global Feminism in Africa ==
Feminism in Egypt has involved a number of social and political groups throughout its history. Although Egypt has in many respects been a forerunner in matters of reform particularly "in developing movements of nationalism, of resistance to imperialism and of feminism,"[1] its development in fighting for equality for women and their rights has not been easy[fact or opinion?].

Ester Akhnoukh Fanous or Esther Fanous (Arabic: إستر فانوس), also known as Ester Wissa (February 19, 1895, Assiut, Egypt – August 1990) was an Egyptian feminist. She was a founding member of the New Woman Society and helped found the Women's Wafd Central Committee in 1920. Her son Hanna Fahmy Wissa has written about her in his family memoir Assiout.[1]

Life Esther Fahmy Wissa was the daughter of doctor Akhnoukh Fanous and Balsam Wissa, from a prominent Coptic Christian family. The national and religious atmosphere dominating her parents' house had a great influence on her personality; she accordingly knew the freedom through the ideas and opinions raised within her family and through the valuable books existing in her father's library. When the famous lawyer, Makram Ebeid, a friend of their family visited her house, Ester Fanous learned that Saad Zaghloul Pasha intended with some friends to travel to England demanding to lift British mandate on Egypt. She then decided to revolt against British colonialism in early 1919.

Feeling grief when the demonstrations overwhelmed Egypt and the British shot the demonstrators, Ester wrote to President Wilson of the United States, saying: "Four persons were sent to fight in this battle" (she means Saad Zaghloul and his friends), "if it is urgent we will send 4 hundreds may be 4 thousands or 4 millions to liberate the 4 precedents. Triple of this number insists to establish justice in our homeland. Elders regain their strength, men are valiant and women are virile".

Ester traveled to Cairo to meet with Safia Zaghloul who proposed the signature of three women on the message dedicated to President Wilson. Hundred women were gathered to sign this message and submit their objections; then they went in a feminist demonstration raising their flags and chanting slogans.

Together with Hoda Shaarawi, Ester Fanous decided to establish a committee representing the women of Egypt acting jointly with the delegation. In St Mark Church, the women held a meeting where Hoda Shaarawi was nominated chair and Fekria Hosny, Ehsan Al-Qoussy and Ester Fanous were nominated as secretaries. They subsequently held a political meeting in a mosque where they delivered their speeches for the first time with men.

In March 1923, Ester Fanous established with other women the Egyptian Feminist Union to improve women's level in literature and social aspect and to promote them to be treated on equal footing with men in rights and obligations. She was involved in other associations such as the Young Women's Christian Association and the Labour Association of Egypt as well as other charitable associations.

Ester Fanous died in August 1990, leaving a significant influence of national unity and the endeavour to emancipate Egyptian Women. Ester Fanous

== See also ==
- Feminism
- RAWA
- Transnational feminism
