= Phasa Lu =

Thai LGBTQ+ coded form of speech

Phasa Lu (Thai: ภาษาลู; Thai pronunciation: [pʰaː˧.saː˩˩˦ luː˧]; lit. 'Lu language') is a type of argot in the Thai language, used mainly within the LGBTQ+ community in Thailand, especially among kathoey (transgender women and effeminate gay men). It combines humor, creativity, and secrecy, allowing speakers to communicate with intimacy and wit while expressing a shared identity. Over time, Phasa Lu has become both a linguistic marker of queer self-expression and a visible part of Thai popular culture.

== Origins ==
The origin of Phasa Lu is not clearly documented. It likely developed among queer and kathoey groups as a way to speak freely without being easily understood by outsiders. Some accounts trace its use at kathoey cafés and entertainment venues in Bangkok during the late 1990s, where playful language and camp humor were part of the performance scene.

A 2021 thesis by Poonyaporn Roopkean (Silpakorn University), Laphulasusulae: Phasa Lu and the Construction of Kathoey Identity, found that most users learned the language during their teenage years and used it to express both individuality and belonging. Since the mid-2000s, Phasa Lu has appeared in television programs, viral videos, and popular music, particularly in "Phak Kon" by Milli, which introduced several expressions to younger audiences.

== Word formation ==
Phasa Lu does not follow strict rules. Instead, it relies on sound alteration and creative wordplay. While there is no fixed system, some common patterns can be observed.

A monosyllabic word can be converted into Phasa Lu by first adding a prefix, which is determined by the onset and vowel of the original syllable. As the name Phasa Lu suggests, the prefix /luː/ (ลู) is usually added. The two syllables then swap sounds, such that the prefix takes the rime of the original syllable, which includes the tone, vowel, and final consonant, if any. For the original syllable, the nucleus is replaced with the vowel of the prefix. The onset, tone and final consonant, if any, often remain the same. For example:

- ลู /luː˧/ + มาก /maːk̚˥˩/ ('very') → ลากมูก /laːk̚˥˩˧.muːk̚˥˩/.

If the onset of the original syllable begins with /l/ (ล) or /r/ (ร), the onset of the prefix is instead /s/. For example:

- ซู /suː˧/ + ลาก /laːk̚˥˩/ ('to drag') → ซากลูก /saːk̚˥˩.luːk̚˥˩/.

If the vowel of the original syllable is /uː/, then the vowel of the prefix becomes /iː/ (อี) or sometimes /ɛː/ (แอ). For example:

- ลี /liː˧/ + ขูด /kʰuːt̚˨˩/ ('to scrape') → หลูดขีด /luːt̚˨˩.kʰiːt̚˨˩/ (Note: Following the orthography rules for Thai tones, a leading ho (ห นำ) is added here so that the prefix syllable with ล matches the low tone in the original syllable.)
- จูบ /t͡ɕuːp̚˨˩/ ('to kiss'):
  - ลี /liː˧/ + จูบ /t͡ɕuːp̚˨˩/ → หลูบจีบ /luːp̚˨˩.t͡ɕiːp̚˨˩/
  - แล /lɛː˧/ + จูบ /t͡ɕuːp̚˨˩/ → หลูบแจบ /luːp̚˨˩.t͡ɕɛːp̚˨˩/

If the vowel is short, the vowel of the prefix may also be short. For example:

- ลุ /lu˦˥/ + กิน /kin˧/ ('to eat') → ลินกุน /lin˧.kun˧/
- ลิ /li˦˥/ + หยุด /jut̚˨˩/ ('to stop') → หลุดหยิด /lut̚˨˩.jit̚˨˩/
- ซุ /su˦˥/ + รัก /rak̚˦˥/ ('to love') → ซักรุก /sak̚˦˥.ruk̚˦˥/
- ซิ /si˦˥/ + หลุด /lut̚˨˩/ ('to fall off') → สุดหลิด /sut̚˨˩.lit̚˨˩/ (Note: Following the orthography rules for Thai tones, ส replaces ซ to indicate low tone.)

If a diphthong or triphthong is not followed by a consonant at the end of the syllable, its off-glide may be optionally treated as a final consonant. For example:

- ไป /paj˧/ ('to go') →
  - ลู /luː˧/ + ไป /paj˧/ → ไลปู /laj˧.puː˧/
  - ลุ /lu˦˥/ + ไป /paj˧/ → ลัยปุย /laj˧.puj˧/ (Note: ไ /aj/ may be treated phonetically equivalent to ัย /aj/, where ั highlights the short vowel in the nucleus with the off-glide ย /j/ treated as a final consonant.)

For words with multiple syllables, each syllable is converted with the same steps. For example:

- กะเทย /ka˨˩.tʰɤːj˧/ ('kathoey') → ลุกะ ลูเทย /lu˦˥.ka˨˩ luː˧.tʰɤːj˧/ → หละกุ เลยทูย /la˨˩.ku˨˩ lɤːj˧.tʰuːj˧/

Because Phasa Lu is primarily spoken, pronunciation and creativity vary from person to person, keeping the language lively and evolving. The method of forming words in Phasa Lu is not limited to the patterns used above.

== Examples ==
Thai	Phasa Lu form	Meaning
รักนะ (rak-na)	ซักรุก ละนุ (sak-ruk la-nu)	Love you
สู้ ๆ (su-su)	หลู้สี้ หลู้สี้ (lu-si lu-si)	Keep fighting
ขอบใจ (khop-chai)	หลอบขูบ ใลจู (lop-khup lai-chu)	Thanks
ทำไรอยู่ (tham rai yu) (Note: Abbreviated from ทำอะไรอยู่)	ลำทุม ไซรู หลู่หยี่ (lam-thum sai-ru lu-yi) (Note: หยี่ written with leading ho to match หลู่. Both syllables still pronounced with low tone like the original syllable อยู่.)	What [are you] doing?
คิดถึง (khit-thueng)	ลิดคุด หลึงถุง (lit-kut lueng-tung)	To miss [somebody]
สวย (suai)	หลวยสูย (luai-sui)	Beautiful
หล่อ (lo)	ซ่อลู่ (so-lu)	Handsome
เพื่อน (phuean)	เลื่อนพู่น (luean-phun)	Friend
เงิบ (ngoep)	เลิบงูบ (loep-ngup)	Embarrassed
หิว (hio)	หลิวหู (lio-hu)	To be hungry
มาก (mak)	ลากมูก (lak-muk)	Very
กล้ามาก (kla mak)	หล้ากู้ ลากมูก (la-ku lak-muk) (Note: Some speakers may reduce onset consonant clusters. In this case, กล /kl/ is reduced to ก /k/.)	Very brave

These examples, often shared on social media and in online Lu dictionaries, show how speakers modify sounds to create humor and a sense of community.

== Social role ==
Phasa Lu functions as both a community language and an act of linguistic creativity. It provides a shared space where LGBTQ+ speakers can connect, tease, and express themselves freely. Speaking Phasa Lu also performs queerness through tone, rhythm, and playfulness, reflecting the camp aesthetics central to Thai kathoey and LGBTQ+ culture. Some words and expressions from Phasa Lu have entered mainstream youth slang, showing how queer speech influences wider Thai language and media.

== Cultural influence ==
Phasa Lu is now heard in Thai entertainment, drag performances, and online discussions. It has appeared in shows such as The Face Thailand and Drag Race Thailand. Online communities have also compiled Lu dictionaries to record new expressions as they appear. The language illustrates how marginalized groups reshape mainstream Thai to express identity and gain visibility.
