= Women in Thailand =

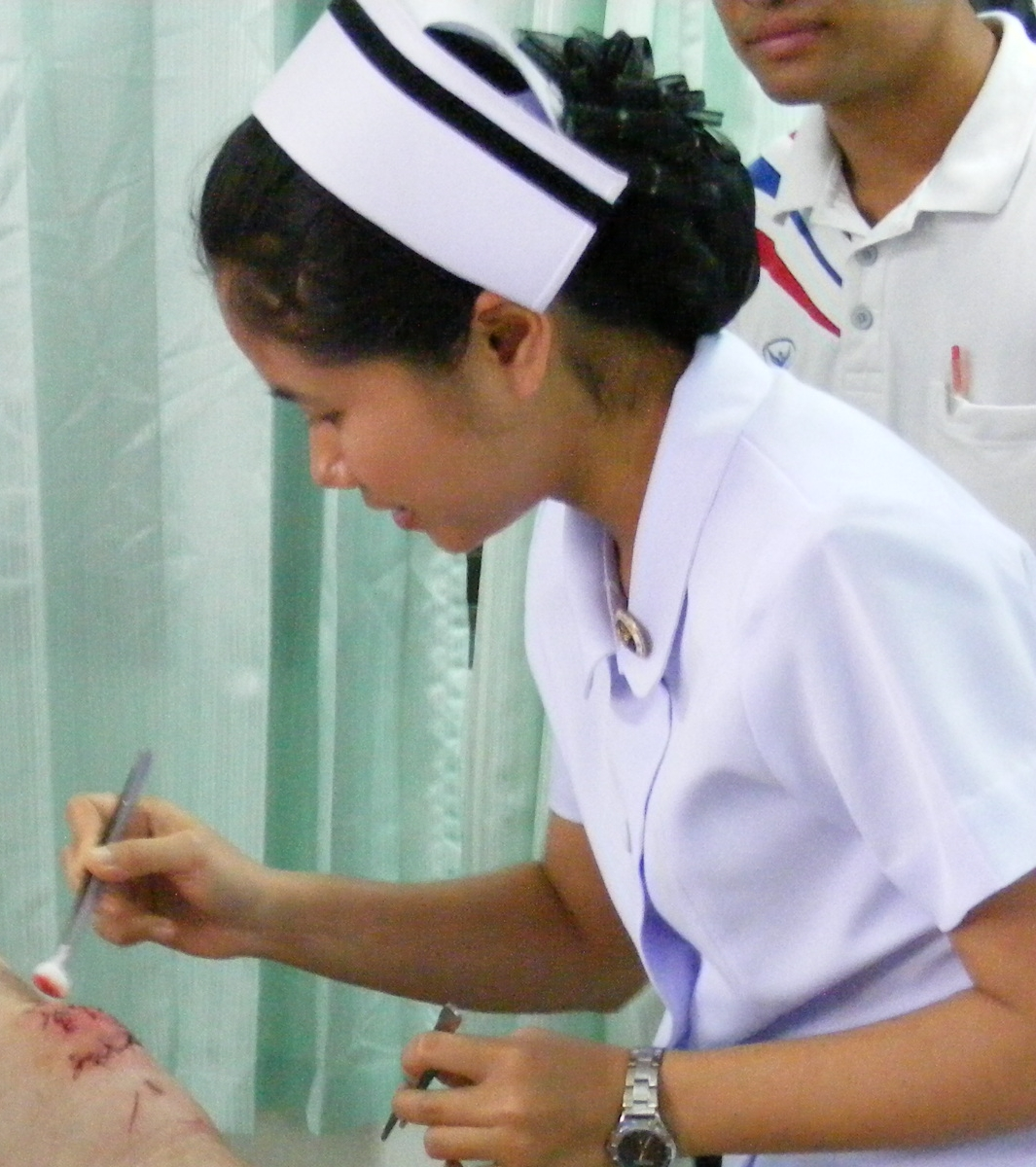
- A female nurse in Thailand

General statistics
- Maternal mortality (per 100,000): 48 (2010)
- Women in parliament: 15.7% (2012)
- Women over 25 with secondary education: 29.0% (2010)
- Women in labour force: 63.8% (2011)

Gender Inequality Index
- Value: 0.333 (2021)
- Rank: 79th out of 191

Global Gender Gap Index
- Value: 0.709 (2022)
- Rank: 79th out of 146

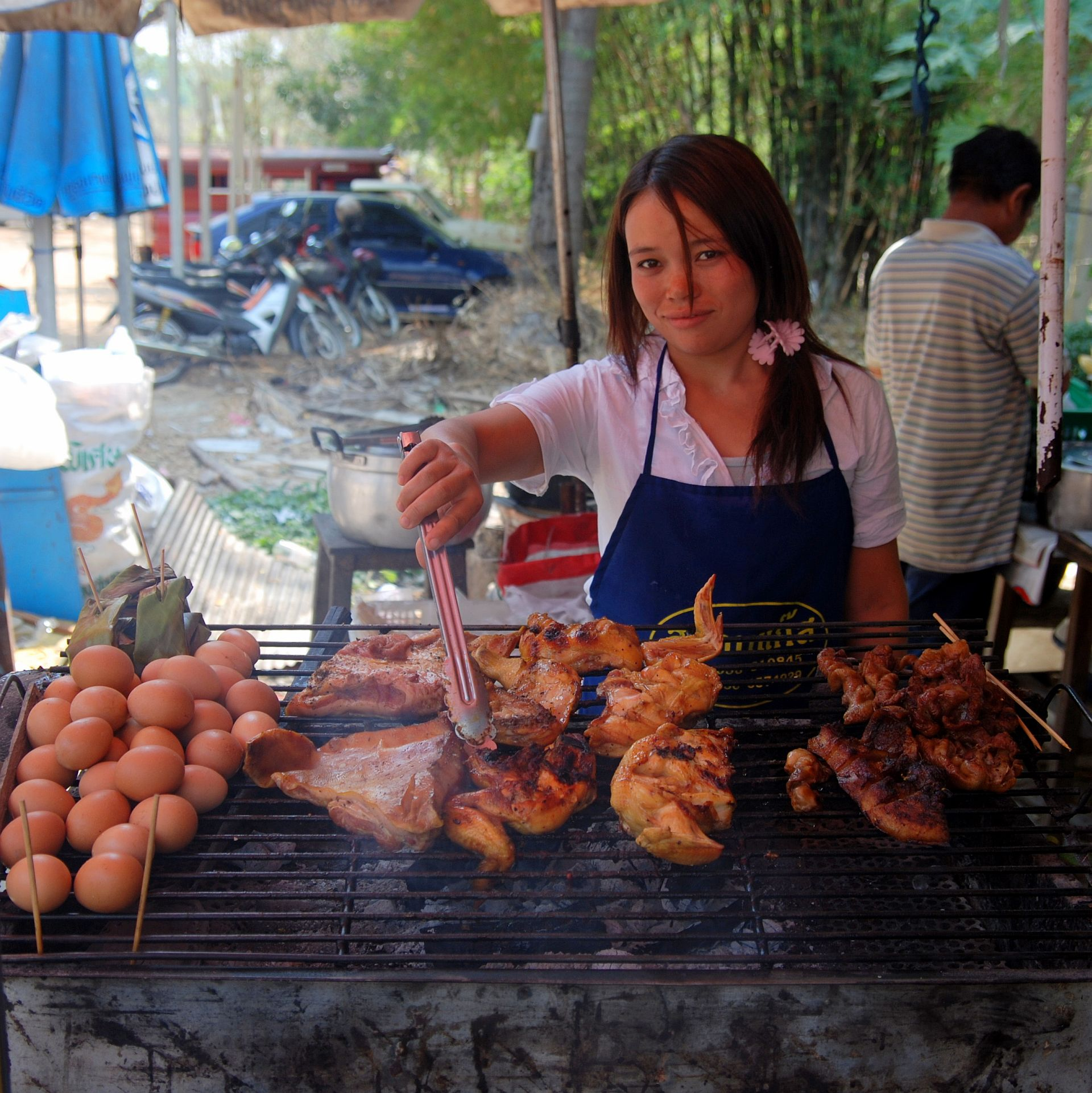
A female vendor

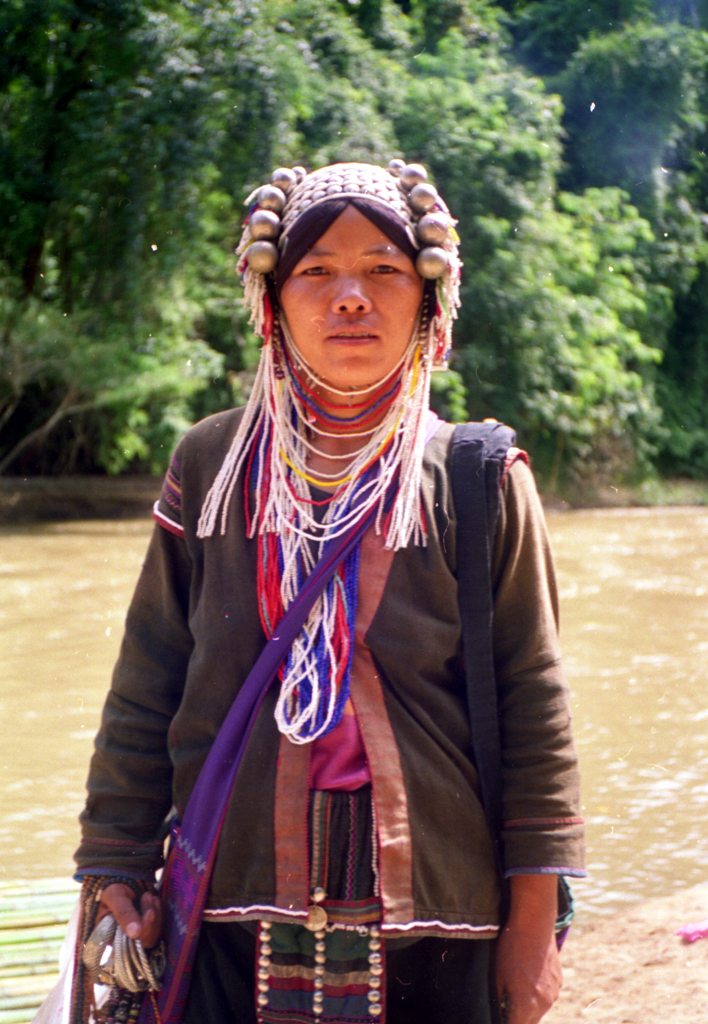
Ethnic woman, northern Thailand

Women in Thailand were among the first women in Asia who were granted the right to vote in 1932. They are underrepresented in Thai politics. Yingluck Shinawatra, a woman, was prime minister from 2011 to 2014. Factors that affect women's participation in the socio-economic field include "inadequate gender awareness in the policy and planning process" and social stereotyping.

== History and Women's movement ==
During the Ayutthaya period, rural and commoner women enjoyed a large amount of freedom, while noble women lacked any degree of freedom. Historically, foreign travelers to Thailand through the centuries continually remarked on the predominance of women entrepreneurs in the marketplace.

In the 1920s, women were allowed to study at the Chulalongkorn University, King Rama VI supported the new class of women (Sao samai) who started to dress in modern fashion and educate and support themselves as independent professionals, and new ideals of women's liberation and equality was voiced by a new women's press such as Satri thai (1926) and Netnari (1932).

The first women's organization was charitable, the first of whom were the Red Unalom Society of Siam (later Thai Red Cross Society) in 1885, but the first women's organization for women's rights was the Women's Association of Siam founded in 1932, and the women's groups were united under the National Council of Women of Thailand (NCWT) in 1957; it was however not until the foundation of Promotion of Status of Women Group, later called Association for the Promotion of Status of Women (APSW) in 1970, that was called an actual feminist organization.

== Politics ==
Despite the absence of legal limitations to women participating in the political arena in Thailand, the factors that have impeded the rise of women in politics include structural barriers, cultural impediments, lower educational attainments, lower socioeconomic status, and power-sharing issues with the opposite sex. It was only on 5 June 1949 that Orapin Chaiyakan became the first woman to be elected to a post in the National Assembly of Thailand (specifically, the House of Representatives.)

== Business ==
Thailand's female population constitutes 47% of the country's workforce, the highest percentage of working women in the Asia-Pacific region. However, these women are also confronted by hiring discrimination and gender inequality in relation to wages due to being "concentrated in lower-paying jobs".

== Marriage ==
According to the National Statistical Office of Thailand, female Thais marry at an earlier age than male Thais, and 24% of Thai households have women identified as "heads of households".

Thailand outlawed marital rape in 2007.

== The evolution of women's rights ==
In Thailand, women's rights according to labor laws require that men and women get paid for the amount of work they do. In 1974, Kanitha Wichiencharoen became a founder of The Association for the Promotion of the Status of Women (APSW), an association made up of both women and men, who campaigned to revise and amend laws to provide better protections for women and children. In the 1977 constitution of Thailand women were required to receive equal rights and protections. However, some inequalities remain in the law. There are no laws prohibiting women from holding office. The biggest problem for gender inequality is when it comes domestic violence and trafficking. Sexual harassment became illegal in 1998, but there are few reported cases and very few that are prosecuted because of the difficulties involved in proving a case. Domestic laws are still to be enacted in the constitution and the requirement for evidence of domestic abuse makes it nearly impossible to prosecute. Traditionally, a girl's education took place mostly in the home, coupled with domestic chores, while boys usually went to a Buddhist monastery for education. Education overall for business and careers is lacking in Southeast Asia.

== See also ==
- Sex trafficking of women and children in Thailand
- Thai people
- Thailand women's national handball team
- Thailand women's national rugby union team
- Thailand women's national football team
- Thailand national women's cricket team
- Thailand women's national volleyball team
- Violence against women in Thailand
- Women in Asia
