= Venus Flytrap (group) =

Thai pop music group

- Origin: Thailand
- Genres: Pop
- Years active: 2005–2010
- Label: Sony BMG
- Members: Bobo (Hot Venus); Gina (Naughty Venus); Taya (Kool Venus); Mew; Bell Nuntita
- Past members: Nok (Posh Venus); Amy (Sweet Venus)
- Website: Official Web Site

Venus Flytrap was a Thai pop music group made up of five young transgender women (commonly called kathoey in Thailand). The members were selected from 200 applicants during an audition in 2005 by Sony BMG Music Entertainment, which also promotes the group and provided it with a recording contract.

Their first public performance occurred in November 2006, and their first album, Visa for Love, was released a month later. Also in December 2006, they performed two songs with Thai superstar Tata Young at one of her concerts in Bangkok.

Venus Flytrap is the first all-transgender music group in Thailand with a recording contract, and the second in the world, following South Korean group Lady.

In 2007, Nok and Amy announced they were leaving the band for personal reasons. Twelve prospective replacements competed on a TV show Venus Flytrap Search for the Missing Puzzle for their spots. Contestants Mew and Bell were the winners.
