= Lady (group) =

Korean pop group

Lady 레이디
- Origin: South Korea
- Genres: K-pop
- Years active: 2005–2007
- Label: Logi Entertainment
- Members: Sinae (신애); Sahara (사하라); Binu (비누); Yuna (유나)
- Website: logient.co.kr/sub/sub_10_14.html

Lady (Hangul: 레이디) was a Korean pop group, noted as the first transgender group from South Korea. The band consisted of Sinae, Sahara, Binu and Yuna. According to the official story, they were the best out of hundreds who tried out to be part of this band. Although only three were supposed to be in the group, a fourth was added at the last minute.

Their formation was inspired by the emergence of Harisu, a Korean singer and actress, who is also transgender. Sinae has previously appeared in commercials with a female dance group as well as a music video by Cho PD, and Sahara is a 2003 beauty pageant winner in Thailand and a former jeans model.

Lady released their first, self-titled album in 2005, consisting of eight tracks, many of them being remixes of their first two singles, "Attention" and "Ladies Night". There was much attention given to them by the press, given their unique status as a transgender band in a conservative country. However, they were able to perform on Korean music shows only a handful of times, while their music and videos were not well received. In order to drum up more publicity, they released a photobook featuring nude shots of all the Lady members, but this also failed to catapult them into stardom.

Lady officially disbanded in early 2007.

== Discography ==
Title	Album details	Track listing
Lady 1st (1집 레이디)	Released: April 7, 2005; Genre: Dance	Track list: 1. Intro - Lady 1st 2. In Da Club; 3. Attention; 4. Ladies Night; 5. Attention (Remix); 6. Ladies Night (Plus1000 Club Mix); 7. Attention (Instrumental); 8. Ladies Night (Instrumental)

== See also ==
- Venus Flytrap (group)
