= Kathoey =

Gender identity in Cambodia, Laos, and Thailand

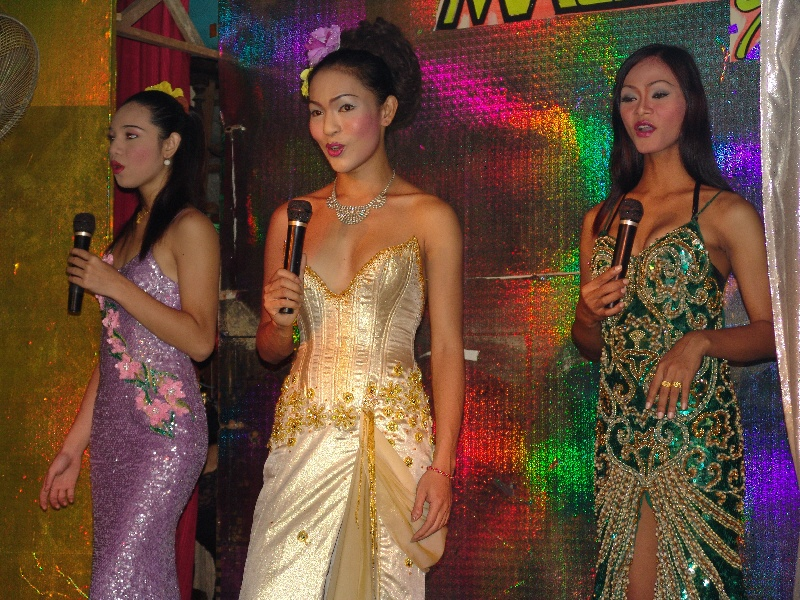
- Kathoey women singing on a stage in Pattaya
- Pronunciation: [kàtʰɤːj]
- Meaning: Trans women, androgynous people, effeminate gay men
- Classification: Gender expression

Other terms
- Synonyms: Ladyboy, phuying praphet song, phet thi sam, sao praphet song
- Associated terms: Bakla, Khanith, Kothi, Hijra, Two-spirit, Trans woman, Akava'ine

Demographics
- Frequency: up to 0.6% male (2011 estimate)
Regions with significant populations
- Cambodia, Laos, Thailand

Legal information
- Recognition: Yes, limited
- Protection: None

Kathoey, katoey or k'teuy, (Note: Khmer: ខ្ទើយ, romanized: khtəəy; Lao: ກະເທີຍ, romanized: ka thœ̄i, pronounced [kàtʰɤːj]; Thai: กะเทย, RTGS: kathoei, pronounced [kàtʰɤːj]) commonly translated as ladyboys, in Cambodia, Laos, and Thailand, are persons assigned male at birth who present as transfeminine or effeminate. Transgender women in Thailand mostly use terms other than kathoey when referring to themselves, such as phuying (Thai: ผู้หญิง, 'woman'). In the context of Thai gender norms, many perceive kathoeys as belonging to a third gender.

In reaction to the sociopolitical obstacles that kathoeys face in Thailand, kathoey activism led to constitutional protection from gender discrimination in January 2015, but a separate third gender category is not legally recognized.

== History ==
Androgynous men in Khmer society were observed by the Chinese explorer Zhou Daguan when he visited Angkor Wat in 1296–1297. In The Customs of Cambodia he records the presence of èrxíngrén (Chinese: 二形人, lit. 'two-formed persons') who tried to "lure Chinese men by promising them sumptuous gifts".

A 19th-century interpretation of the Chbab Srey is also said to contain mentions of "malicious" women being punished in the "four hells" and being reincarnated as kathoey.

== Terminology ==
The word kathoey is of Khmer ខ្ទើយ khteuy. It is most often translated as ladyboy in English conversation, an expression that has become popular across Southeast Asia.

A study of 195 Thai transgender women found that most of the participants referred to themselves as phuying (ผู้หญิง, 'women'), with a minority referring to themselves as phuying praphet song ('second kind of woman') and very few referring to themselves as kathoey. Related phrases include phet thi sam (เพศที่สาม, 'third sex'), and sao praphet song or phu ying praphet song (สาวประเภทสอง, ผู้หญิงประเภทสอง—both meaning 'second-type female').

== General description ==
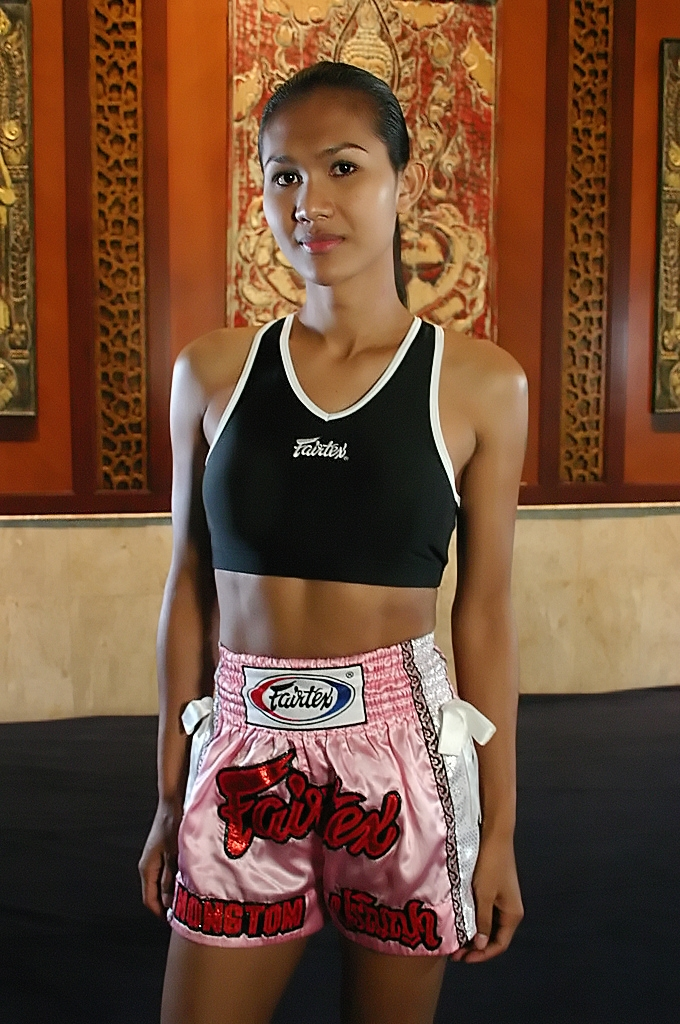
Nong Tum, a kathoey boxer, model and actress. She is internationally recognised as the subject of the biographical film Beautiful Boxer, though her character was played by another actor.

Although kathoey is often translated as 'transgender woman' in English, this term is not correct in Thailand as it is also used for gay men, and was originally used to refer to androgynous people. Before the 1960s, kathoey included anyone who deviated from the dominant sexual norms. Because of this confusion in translation, the English translation of kathoey is usually 'ladyboy' (or variants of the term).

Use of the term kathoey suggests that the person self-identifies as a type of male, in contrast to sao praphet song (which, like "trans woman", suggests a "female" (sao) identity), and in contrast to phet thi sam ('third sex'). The term phu ying praphet song, which can be translated as 'second-type female', is also used to refer to kathoey. The Australian scholar of sexual politics in Thailand Peter Jackson claims that the term kathoey was used in antiquity to refer to intersex people, and that the connotation changed in the mid-20th century to cover cross-dressing males. Kathoey has become an iconic symbol of modern Thai culture. The term can refer to males who exhibit varying degrees of femininity. Many dress as women and undergo "feminising" medical procedures such as breast implants, hormones, silicone injections, or Adam's apple reductions. Others may wear make-up and use feminine speech patterns, but dress as men, and are closer to the Western category of effeminate gay man than transgender.

The term kathoey may be considered pejorative, especially in the form kathoey-saloey. It has a meaning similar to the English language 'fairy' or 'queen'. Kathoey can also be a derogatory word for gay people.

=== Religion ===
In Buddhism there are a variety of interpretations on how to relate to kathoey and transgender people. Some within the Theravada school of Buddhism see being a kathoey as the result of karmic punishment for previous lifetimes. Bunmi, a Thai Buddhist author, believes that homosexuality stems from "lower level spirits" (phi-sang-thewada), a factor that is influenced by one's past life. Some Buddhists view kathoeys as persons born with a disability as a consequence of past sins. Using the notion of karma, some Thais believe that being a kathoey is the result of transgressions in past lives, concluding that kathoeys deserve pity rather than blame. Others, however, believe that kathoeys should rectify their past life transgressions. This is done through merit-making such as "making donations to a temple or by ordaining as monks". While other Buddhists believe that the Buddha was never hostile to LGBT people and therefore that seeing being LGBT as a karmic punishment is a mistaken interpretation.

In northern Thailand, kathoeys, women, and gay men are considered to have soft souls and are therefore easily frightened and highly susceptible to possession. These three groups are heavily represented in spirit summoning since people without soft souls are considered immune to possession. Despite this, kathoeys being a large proportion of the spirit medium population is a modern phenomenon since there is little evidence that kathoeys were associated with religious practice and were banned from religious ceremony before the modern period. In rural areas in north Thailand, kathoeys have taken on jobs as spirit mediums where they become known as Kathoey maa-khii. Spirit mediumship provides kathoeys with a source of income as well as a support network.

During the festival of the nine gods in southern Thailand, kathoeys participate as spiritual mediums of the god Kaun Im. The southern Thailand tradition of the spirit medium Nora dance has traditionally been a primarily male performance. However, women and kathoeys have become an increasingly large proportion of the performers, with a majority of male performers in 2014 being either gay men or kathoeys.

== Requirements to confirm eligibility for gender-affirming surgery ==
In Thai cities such as Bangkok, there are currently two to three gender-affirming surgery (GAS) operations per week, more than 3,500 over the past thirty years. With the massive increase in GASs, there has also been an increase in prerequisites, measures that must be taken in order to be eligible for the operation. Patients must be at least 18 years old with permission from parents if under 20 years old. One must provide evidence of diagnosis of gender dysphoria from a psychologist or psychiatrist. Before going through gender-affirming surgery, one must be on hormones/antiandrogens for at least one year. Patients must have a note from the psychiatrist or clinical psychologist. Two months before the surgery, patients are required to see a psychiatrist in Thailand to confirm eligibility for gender-affirming surgery.

== Social context ==
Kathoeys are more visible and more accepted in Thai culture than transgender people are in other countries in the world. Several popular Thai models, singers, and movie stars are kathoeys, and Thai newspapers often print photographs of the winners of female and kathoey beauty contests side by side. The phenomenon is not restricted to urban areas; there are kathoeys in most villages, and kathoey beauty contests are commonly held as part of local fairs.

A common stereotype is that older, well-off kathoeys provide financial support to young men with whom they are in romantic relationships.

Kathoeys currently face many social and legal impediments. Families (and especially fathers) are typically disappointed if a child becomes a kathoey, and kathoeys often have to face the prospect of disclosing their birth sex. However, kathoeys generally have greater acceptance in Thailand than most other East Asian countries. Problems can also arise in regards to access to amenities and gender allocation.

=== Employment ===
Many kathoeys work in predominately female occupations, such as in shops, restaurants, and beauty salons, but also in factories (a reflection of Thailand's high proportion of female industrial workers). Discrimination in employment is rampant as many perceive kathoeys as having mental problems and refuse to hire them. In addition, the difficulty for kathoeys to change their gender marker on official documentation makes finding employment harder. For these reasons, many kathoeys are only able to find work in sex and entertainment industries. These sorts of jobs include tourist centers, cabarets, and sex work. Kathoeys who work in the tourism sector must conform to a physical image that is preferred by tourists. Kathoeys who obtain jobs in the civil service sector are required to wear uniforms coinciding with their assigned sex of male. In 2011, the short-lived airline P.C. Air began hiring kathoeys as flight attendants.

In rural areas in northern Thailand, some kathoeys have acquired jobs picking fruit from trees. According to rural traditions, men and women perform separate roles in the process of collecting fruit. Men climb trees while women collect fruit in baskets below. However, kathoeys are allowed to perform both roles. Kathoeys in rural areas in northern Thailand have begun acquiring jobs as spirit mediums as well.

=== Education ===
Many schools teach students that being transgender is wrong and a form of sexual deviancy. Thai schools utilize gendered uniforms as well. In 2015, Bangkok University revised its uniform guidelines to allow transgender students to wear the uniform of their preferred gender; however, many other institutions still mandate transgender students to wear the uniform that matches their assigned sex. Several kathoey and transgender women choose which schools to attend based mainly on the ability to wear the gendered school uniform they prefer. Some kathoeys report facing violence and discrimination from both their classmates and their teachers at all levels of schooling due to them being a kathoey. This has led to some dropping out or changing schools.

== Political context ==
Thailand's 2015 Gender Equality Act is currently the strongest legal tool for advocating for transgender rights. It protects those who are "of a different appearance from his/her own sex by birth" from unfair gender discrimination. Prior to the creation of the 2016 Thai constitution, it was believed that anti-discrimination terms would be set for a new category called 'third gender'. This term, however, was missing from the new constitution and no protections for transgender people were specifically outlined. Instead, the constitution prohibited "unjust discrimination" based on differences in sex.

=== Identification documents ===
Legal recognition of kathoeys and transgender people is nonexistent in Thailand: even if a transgender person has had sex reassignment surgery, they are not allowed to change their legal sex on their identification documents. Identification documents are particularly important for daily life in Thailand as they facilitate communication with businesses, bureaucratic agencies (i.e., signing up for educational courses or medical care), law enforcement, etc. The primary identification form used in Thailand is The Thai National Identification Card, which is used for many important processes such as opening a bank account. The vast majority of transgender people are unable to change these documents to reflect their chosen gender, and those who are allowed must uphold strict standards. Transgender individuals are often accused of falsifying documents and are forced to show their identification documents. This results in their exclusion from various institutions, such as education or housing. Impeded by these identity cards daily, transgender people are outed by society.

The criminal justice sector relies on identification cards when deciding where to detain individuals. This means that kathoeys are detained alongside men. By law, women are not allowed to be detained alongside men, and since kathoeys are not legally classified as women, they reside in the male section in prison. Within prison, kathoeys are forced to cut their hair and abide by strict rules governing gender expression. Additionally, they are denied access to hormones and other transition-related health care.

=== Military draft ===
Transgender individuals were automatically exempted from compulsory military service in Thailand. Kathoeys were deemed to suffer from "mental illness" or "permanent mental disorder". These mental disorders were required to appear on their military service documents, which are accessible to future employers. In 2006, the Thai National Human Rights Commission (NHRC) overturned the use of discriminatory phraseology in Thailand's military service exemption documents. With Thai law banning citizens from changing their sex on their identification documents, everyone under the male category must attend a "lottery day" where they are randomly selected to enlist in the army for two years. In March 2008, the military added a "third category" for transgender people that dismissed them from service due to "illness that cannot be cured within 30 days". In 2012, the Administrative Court ruled that the Military and Defense needed to revise the reasoning for their exemption of kathoeys from the military. As such, kathoeys are now exempt from the military under the reasoning that their "gender does not match their sex at birth".

== Performance ==
=== Representation in cinema ===
Kathoeys began to gain prominence in the cinema of Thailand during the late-1980s. The depiction at first was negative by showing kathoeys suffering bad karma, suicide, and abandoned by straight lovers. Named by the Thai cinema scholar Oradol Kaewprasert, The First Wave of Thai Queer Cinema was a wave of films that depicted stories focused solely on queer storylines. One of these films include The Last Song (1985) directed by Pisal Akkrasenee, the first ever Thai film to have a kathoey actress as the lead role. The main character, Somying, was named after the actress portraying her, Somying Daorai, the name meaning "a proper woman" in Thai. The film director, Pisal Akkrasenee, had stated he wanted the film to portray the tragic experience of being kathoey in Thailand.

Independent and experimental films contributed to defying sexual norms in gay cinema in the 1990s. The 2000 film The Iron Ladies, directed by Yongyoot Thongkongtoon, depicted a positive portrayal of an almost entirely kathoey volleyball team by displaying their confidence. In 2003, the film Beautiful Boxer, directed by Ekachai Uekrongtham, told the story of a famous kathoey Maui Thai fighter named Parinya Charoenphol. The film was referenced in the book Movies and Mental Illness: Using Films to Understand Psychopathology for the film's focus and commentary on gender dysphoria. The rising middle-class in Bangkok and vernacular queer culture made the mainstream portrayal of kathoeys more popular on television and in art house cinemas, leading to the creation of a sub-genre in Thai cinema called Kathoey-films.

=== Miss Tiffany's Universe ===
Feminine beauty in Thailand allowed transgender people to have their own platform where they can challenge stereotypes and claim cultural recognition. Miss Tiffany's Universe is a beauty contest open to all transgender women. Beginning in 1998, the pageant takes place every May in Pattaya, Thailand. With over 100 applicants, the pageant is considered to be one of the most popular transgender pageants in the world. Through beauty pageants, Thailand has been able to promote the country's cosmetic surgery industry, which has had a massive increase in medical tourism for sex reassignment surgery. According to Miss Tiffany's Universe website, the live broadcast attracted a record of fifteen million viewers. The winner of the pageant receives a tiara, sash, car, and a grand prize of 100,000 baht (US$3,000), equivalent to an annual wage for a Thai factory worker. The assistant manager director, Alisa Phanthusak, stated that the pageant wants kathoeys to be visible and to treat them as normal. It is the biggest annual event in Pattaya.

Transgender beauty contests are found in the countryside at village fairs or festivals. All-male revues are common in gay bars in Bangkok and as drag shows in the tourist resort of Pattaya.

== Recent developments ==
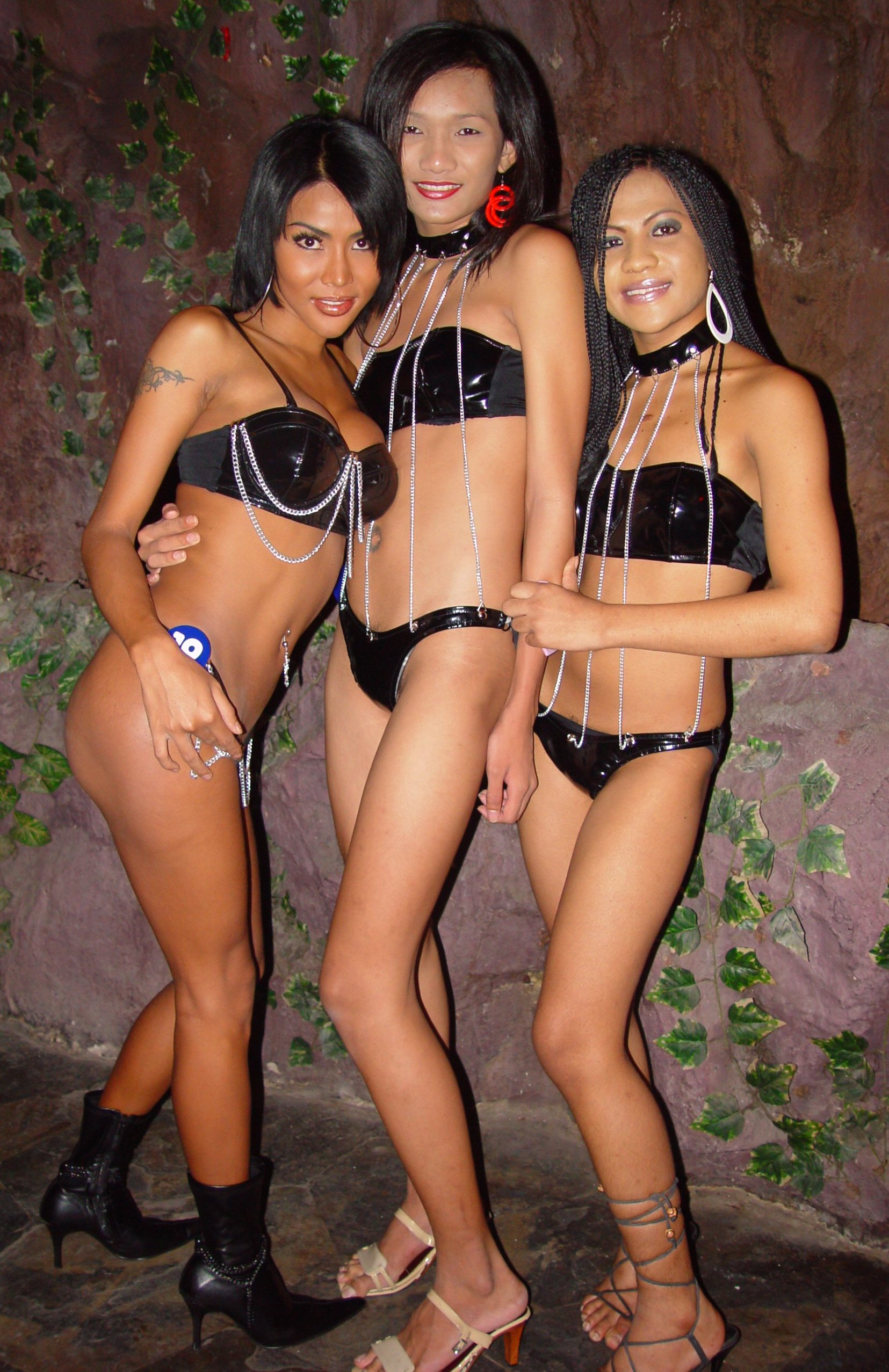
Kathoeys working in a go-go bar in Bangkok's Nana Plaza entertainment area

In 1993, Thailand's teacher training colleges implemented a semi-formal ban on allowing homosexual (which included kathoey) students enrolling in courses leading to qualification for positions in kindergartens and primary schools. In January 1997, the Rajabhat Institutes (the governing body of the colleges) announced it would formalize the ban, which would extend to all campuses at the start of the 1997 academic year. The ban was quietly rescinded later in the year, following the replacement of the Minister of Education.

In 1996, a volleyball team composed mostly of gays and kathoeys, known as The Iron Ladies (Thai: สตรีเหล็ก, satree lek), later portrayed in two Thai movies, won the Thai national championship. The Thai government, concerned with the country's image, barred two of the kathoeys from joining the national team and competing internationally.

Among the most famous kathoeys in Thailand is Nong Tum, a former champion Thai boxer who emerged into the public eye in 1998. She would present in a feminine manner and had commenced hormone therapy while still a popular boxer; she would enter the ring with long hair and make-up, occasionally kissing a defeated opponent. She announced her retirement from professional boxing in 1999 – undergoing gender reassignment surgery, while continuing to work as a coach, and taking up acting and modeling. She returned to boxing in 2006.

In 2004, the Chiang Mai Technology School allocated a separate restroom for kathoeys, with an intertwined male and female symbol on the door. The school's fifteen kathoey students were required to wear male clothing at school but were allowed to sport feminine hairdos. The restroom featured four stalls and no urinals.

Following the 2006 Thai coup d'état, kathoeys are hoping for a new third sex to be added to passports and other official documents in a proposed new constitution. In 2007, legislative efforts began to allow kathoeys to change their legal sex if they had undergone gender reassignment surgery; this latter restriction was controversially discussed in the community.

Bell Nuntita, a contestant of the Thailand's Got Talent TV show, became a YouTube hit when she first performed singing as a girl and then switched to a masculine voice.

It is estimated that as many as six in every thousand people assigned male at birth later present themselves as transgender women or phu ying kham phet.

== Advocacy ==
=== Activism ===
Thai activists have mobilized for over two decades to secure sexual diversity rights. Beauty pageant winner Yollada Suanyot, known as Nok, founded the Trans Female Association of Thailand based on changing sex designation on identification cards for post-operative transgender women. Nok promoted the term phuying kham-phet instead of kathoey but was controversial because of its connotation with gender identity disorder. The goal of the Thai Transgender Alliance is to delist gender dysphoria from international psychological diagnostic criteria. The Alliance uses the term kathoey to advocate for transgender identity. A common protest sign during sexual rights marches is Kathoey mai chai rok-jit meaning "Kathoey are not mentally ill".

Activism in Thailand is discouraged if it interferes with official policy. In January 2006, the Thai Network of People Living With HIV/AIDS had their offices raided after demonstrations against Thai-US foreign trade agreements. Under the Thai Constitution of 1997, the right to be free of discrimination based on health conditions helped to minimize the stigma against communities living with HIV/AIDS. In most cases, governments and their agencies fail to protect transgender people against these exclusions. There is a lack of HIV/AIDS services for specifically transgender people, and feminizing hormones largely go without any medical monitoring.

Trans prejudice has produced discriminatory behaviors that have led to the exclusion of transgender people from economic and social activity. Worldwide, transgender people face discrimination amongst family members, in religious and educational settings, and in the workplace. Accepted mainly in fashion-related jobs or show business, transgender people are discriminated against in the job market and have limited job opportunities. Kathoeys have also experienced ridicule from coworkers and tend to have lower salaries. Long-term unemployment reduces the chances of contributing to welfare for the family and lowers self-esteem, causing a higher likelihood of prostitution in specialized bars. "Ladyboy" bars also can provide a sense of community and reinforce a female sense of identity for kathoeys. Harassment from the police is evident, especially for kathoeys who work on the streets. Kathoeys may be rejected in official contexts, being denied entry or services.

Based on a study by AIDS Care participants who identified as a girl or kathoey at an early age were more likely to be exposed to prejudice or violence from men in their families. Kathoeys are more subjected to sexual attacks from men than are other homosexuals.

Anjaree is one of Thailand's gay feminist organizations, established in mid-1986 by women's rights activists. The organization advocated wider public understanding of homosexuality based on the principles of human rights. The first public campaign opposing sexual irregularity was launched in 1996.

Social spaces are often limited for kathoeys even if Thai society does not actively persecute them. Indigenous Thai cultural traditions have given a social space for sexual minorities. In January 2015, the Thai government announced it would recognize the third sex in its constitution in order to ensure all sexes be treated equally under the law.

== In popular culture ==
The first all-kathoey music group in Thailand was formed in 2006. It is named "Venus Flytrap" and was selected and promoted by Sony BMG Music Entertainment. "The Lady Boys of Bangkok" is a kathoey revue that has been performed in the UK since 1998, touring the country in both theatres and the famous "Sabai Pavilion" for nine months each year.

Ladyboys, also a popular term used in Thailand when referring to transgender women, was the title of a popular documentary in the United Kingdom, where it was aired on Channel 4 TV in 1992 and was directed by Jeremy Marre. Marre aimed to portray the life of two adolescent kathoeys living in rural Thailand, as they strove to land a job at a cabaret revue in Pattaya.

Thai kathoey style and fashion have largely borrowed from Korean popular culture.

=== "Uncle Go Paknam" ===
"Uncle Go Paknam", created by Pratchaya Phanthathorn, is a popular queer advice column that first appeared in 1975 in a magazine titled Plaek, meaning 'strange'. Through letters and responses it became an outlet to express the desires and necessities of the queer community in Thailand. The magazine achieved national popularity because of its bizarre and often gay content. It portrayed positive accounts of kathoeys and men called "sharks" who view transgender people as legitimate or even preferred sexual partners and started a more accepting public discourse in Thailand. Under the pen name of Phan Thathron he wrote the column "Girls to the Power of 2" that included profiles of kathoeys in a glamorous or erotic pose. "Girls to the Power of 2" were the first accounts of kathoey lives based on interviews that allowed their voices to be published in the mainstream press of Thailand. The heterosexual public became more inclined to read about transgender communities that were previously given negative press in Thai newspapers. Go Paknam's philosophy was "kathoeys are good (for men)."

=== Inside Thailand's Third Gender ===
A documentary entitled Inside Thailand's Third Gender examines the lives of kathoeys in Thailand and features interviews with various transgender women, the obstacles these people face with their family and lovers, but moreover on a larger societal aspect where they feel ostracized by the religious Thai culture. Following contestants participating in one of the largest transgender beauty pageants, known as Miss Tiffany's Universe, the film not only illustrates the process and competition that takes place during the beauty pageant, but also highlights the systems of oppression that take place to target the transgender community in Thailand.

== See also ==
- Anjaree
- Bahasa Binan
- Femminiello
- Gender identities in Thailand
- Hijra (South Asia)
- Miss Gay Philippines
- Māhū
- Muxe
- Pandaka
- Tamil sexual minorities
- Third gender
- Travesti
- Two-spirit
