= Bell Nuntita =

Bell Nuntita เบลล์ นันทิตา
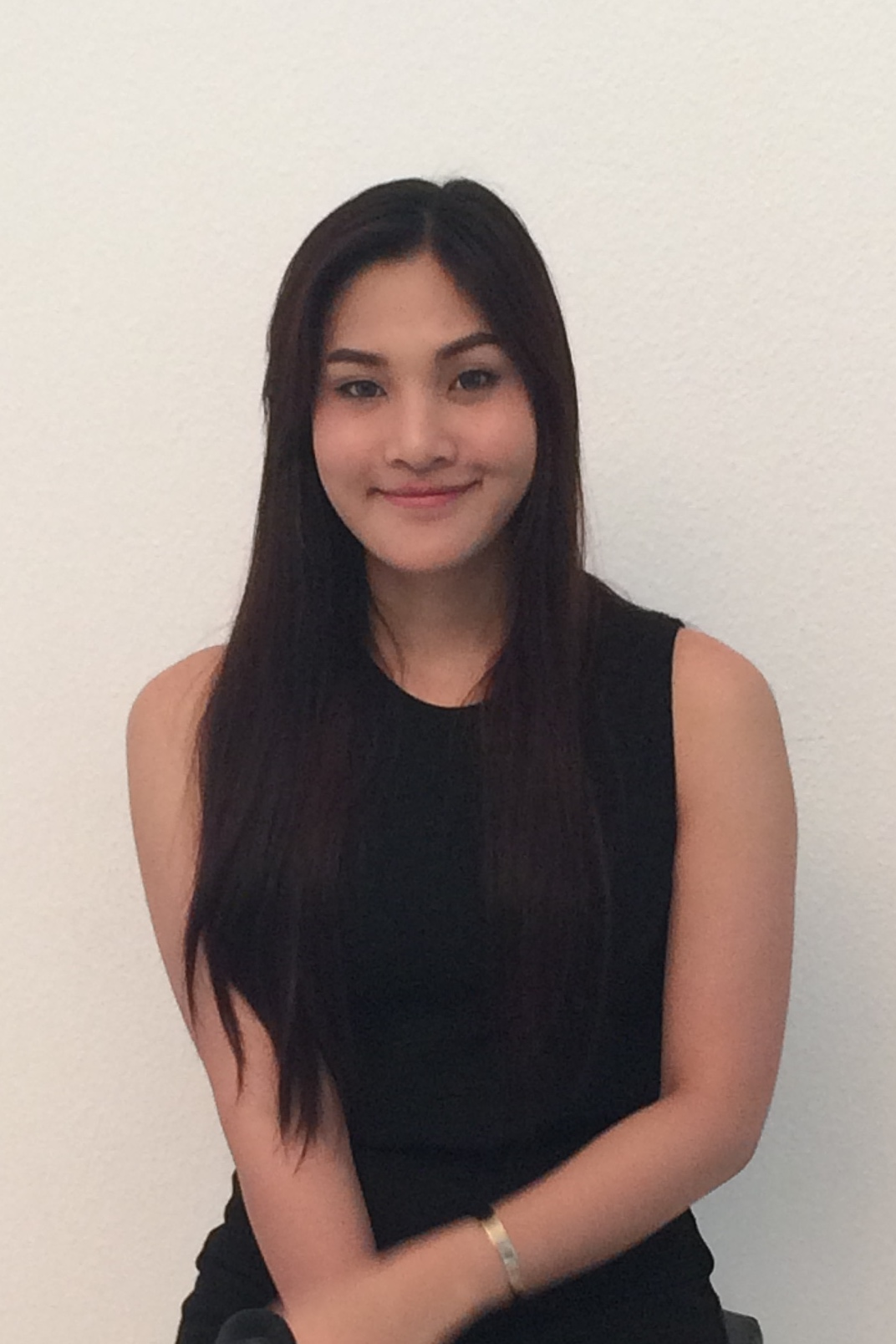
- Bell Nuntita in May 2016

Background information
- Also known as: Bell; Art
- Born: Nuntita Khampiranon Thai: นันทิตา ฆัมภิรานนท์ 20 December 1983 (age 42); Nakhon Ratchasima, Thailand
- Genre: Pop
- Occupations: Singer; entertainer; actress
- Instruments: Vocals; guitar
- Years active: 2011–present
- Label: Sony BMG Thailand

Nuntita Khampiranon (Thai: นันทิตา ฆัมภิรานนท์; RTGS: Nanthita Khamphiranon; born 20 December 1983), or nickname Art (อาร์ต), stage name Bell (เบลล์) and usually known as Bell Nuntita, is a Thai transgender actress, singer, entertainer, and radio DJ. Nuntita was part of a TV show called Venus Flytrap Search for the Missing Puzzle in 2007. As one of twelve contestants, she competed to take the place of two former cast members. Nuntita and another contestant named Mew won the competition and became part of the kathoey band Venus Flytrap. She became popular after a performance during her audition on Thailand's Got Talent and became a YouTube hit when she first performed singing as a girl, and the crowd was amazed when she switched to a masculine voice.

== Personal life ==
Although being transgender is fairly well-accepted in Thailand, life as Bell was not exactly easy. In a Thai TV interview, she said it was very difficult to explain her gender identity to her family. As the only child of a military father, she faced many challenges to be accepted. However, today her family has accepted her and she is happy.

She has absolute pitch.

== Thailand's Got Talent ==
Nuntita was convinced to audition for Thailand's Got Talent by Anucha "Chi" Lanprasert, a talent scout. It was Nuntita's idea to surprise the crowd by first singing in a middleweight contralto voice before switching to a masculine baritone midway through the audition. In an April episode of the show, the judges picked Nuntita to be one of 48 semi-finalists. She received the second most votes in the semi-final round, and was thus subject to the three judges' determining votes. She passed to the final round by receiving "yes" votes from two of the three judges. Her first remixed song on the show's audition stage was a combination of "Yahk Roo Tae Mai Yahk Taam" by Calories Blah Blah and "Unlovable" by MILD, two popular Thai tunes. The three-minute song displayed Nuntita's choice of song style, mixing different genres and vocal ranges. After Nuntita's audition video appeared on YouTube and other sites, the video quickly went viral. She is sometimes dubbed as Thailand's version of Scottish singer Susan Boyle.

Nuntita appeared on multiple Thai talk shows and had many nationally televised performances. She has appeared in TV shows such as Mum Show hosted by Petchtai Wongkamlao where she spoke of her gender transition. She said she participated in the army conscription lottery but did not draw the commission to enlist in Thailand's army. Nuntita also performed the full versions of "Yahk Roo Tae Mai Yahk Taam" and "Unloveable" at a promotional event for Miss Tiffany Universe, Thailand's transgender beauty pageant. TV shows and other publicity outlets commonly interviewed her about her reaction to the sudden fame. Bell was also featured on the front cover of Who Weekly Magazine. In July 2011, she held a one-night concert for her fans in Singapore.

== Discography ==
Extended Play (EP)
Year	Song title	Label
2012	Belle Nuntita (Thai: เบลล์ นันทิตา ชุด เบลล์ นันทิตา)	Sony BMG Thailand & iTunes

DVD
Year	Song title	Label
2012	Karaoke DVD: Bell Nuntita (Thai: คาราโอเกะ DVD: เบลล์ นันทิตา)	Sony BMG Thailand

Singles
Year	Song title	Label
2011	Siang Tee Bplian (Thai: เสียงที่เปลี่ยน; RTGS: Siang Thi Plian)	Sony BMG Thailand
2012	Paradise	Sony BMG Thailand
2012	Rak Khon Ror (Thai: รักคนรอ; RTGS: Rak Khon Ro)	Sony BMG Thailand

OST Single
Year	Song title	Label
2011	It Gets Better OST : Mai Dai Kor Hai Maa Rak (Thai: ไม่ได้ขอให้มารัก; RTGS: Mai Dai Kho Hai Ma Rak)	Sony BMG Thailand

== Filmography ==
=== Film ===
Year	Title	Role
2011	It Gets Better	Tonlew
2012	Dark Flight 407	
2014	Love is simple	
2015	How to Win at Checkers (Every Time)	
