= Ara Wilson =

University professor and author (d. 2026)

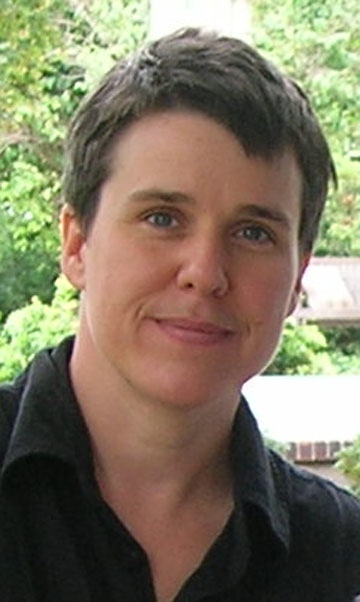
- Died: October 10, 2026; Durham, North Carolina

Academic work
- Institutions: Duke University

Ara Wilson was a university professor and author.

== Overview ==
Her work focused on the feminist ethnography of globalization through description and analysis of various market economies. Her work examined the cultural, social, and sexual aspects of Bangkok economies, as well as illustrating the inaccuracies of Eurocentric ideology.

Between 1988 and 2000, Wilson did fieldwork in Thailand, doing research for The Intimate Economies of Bangkok: Tomboys, Tycoons, and Avon Ladies in the Global City. Wilson’s research was heavily focused on sexual and ethnic identity which “are produced and transformed through the modernity of the non-Western world”. Wilson was director of the program in the study of sexualities at Duke University, where she was also an Associate Professor of Women’s Studies. Wilson worked extensively with non-governmental organizations dealing with women’s rights, as well as sexual rights in Thailand.

Wilson died on October 10, 2026.

== The Intimate Economies of Bangkok ==
=== Methods of Research ===
Wilson got most of her research for The Intimate Economies of Bangkok: Tomboys, Tycoons, and Avon Ladies in the Global City from the two years field work she spent in Bangkok from Dec 1992 – Jan 1994, as well as from many of her visits ranging from 1988-2000. During this time, she worked part-time in a telecommunications marketing office, which gave her access to social scenes and "participant observations." Like any other ethnographer, Wilson conducted most of her fieldwork alone, relying mostly on informal interviews and day-to-day conversations. Her interviewees were usually ages 20–25, many of Chinese descent, with economic standings ranging from minor royalty to peasants.

Living at the edge of Bangkok's Chinatown, Wilson observed Sino-Thai business families, major market areas of the city, the prostitution industry, and the class/gender/sexual dimensions of professional identities in transnational corporations. She gathered information primarily on key intersections of social identity and relationships, by focusing on the behavior of architecture, material objects, primary texts, secondary texts, and especially business press. Specific commercial sites included shophouses, retail stores like the Central Department Store, the tourist sex trade of the go-go bars, the popular downtown shopping mall MBK, a telecommunications marketing office, and direct sales such as Amway and Avon.

== Works and Publications ==
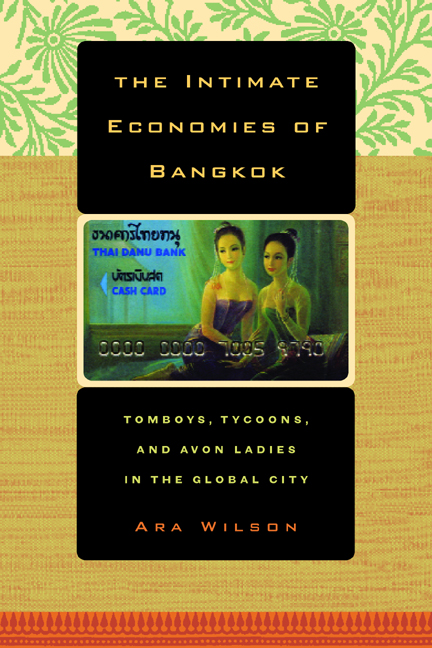
- Cover of Intimate Economies of Bangkok.
  The Intimate Economies of Bangkok: Tomboys, Tycoons, and Avon Ladies in the World City. University of California Press, 2004.
- “The Beckoning Lady: Transnational Flows of Sacred and Economic Power in the Markets of Bangkok.” In preparation.
- Guest editor of “Neoliberal Networking: The Global Assemblages of Direct Sales.” Themed issue in preparation for Identities.
- “NGOs as Erotic Sites.” Under review for proposed anthology, Queering Development, ed., Amy Lind. (2010).
- “Asian Modernity: Diasporic Agents And Trans-Asian Flows In Thailand.” In Everyday International Political Economy: Non-Elite Agency in the Transformation of the World Economy, ed. J.M. Hobson and L. Seabrooke. Under review at Cambridge University Press.
- Sexual Latitudes: The Erotic Politics of Globalization. A feminist analysis of how globalization shapes conditions for transnational sexual politics and practices.
- “Feminism in the Space of the World Social Forum.” Forthcoming, special issue of Journal of International Women’s Studies. 2007.
- “Queering Asia.” Intersections 14, 2006.
- “Plural Economies and Gendered Resistance in Bangkok.” In On the Edges of Development, eds. Kum-Kum Bhavnani and John Foran, eds. London: Zed Press, forthcoming. 2008.
- “Intra-Asian Circuits and the Problem of Global Queer.” Conference Archives of the Sexualities, Genders & Rights in Asia 1st International Conference of Asian Queer Studies.
- “Bangkok, the Bubble City.” In Wounded Cities: Destruction and Reconstruction in a Globalized World. Eds. Jane Schneider and Ida Susser. pp. 203–226. Oxford: Berg Press, 2003.
- “The Transnational Geography of Sexual Rights.” In Truth Claims: Representation and Human Rights. Eds. Mark Philip Bradley and Patrice Petro. pp. 253–265. New Brunswick: Rutgers University Press, 2002.
- “The Empire of Direct Sales and the Making of Thai Entrepreneurs.” Critique of Anthropology 19(4) 1999: 401-422.
- Co-author with S. Kasmir, “Introduction.” Critique of Anthropology 19(4) 1999: 376-378.
- “Decentralization and the Avon Lady in Bangkok, Thailand.” PoLAR: Political and Legal Anthropology Review. May 21(1) 1998: 77-83.
- “Report: Lesbian Visibility and Sexual Rights at Beijing.” Signs 22 (autumn) 1996: 214-218.
- “When Sex is a Job: An Interview with Chantawipa Apisuk of Empower.” In Sondra Zeidenstein and K. Moore, eds., Learning about Sexuality. pp. 333–342. NY: The Population Council, 1996.
- Co-author, “Introduction: Questioning Science.” Socialist Review Special Issue (summer), 1992.
- “American Catalogues of Asian Brides.” In Johnnetta Cole, ed., Anthropology for the Nineties. pp. 114–125. NY: The Free Press, 1988.
- “Thailand and Sex Tourism.” The Palgrave Dictionary of Transnational History, Eds. Akira Iriye and Pierre-Yves Saunier. Houndmills, Basingstoke, Hampshire: Palgrave Macmillan, forthcoming.
- “Global Politics and the Feminist Question.” ebr (Electronic Book Review).
- “The Intimacy of Globalization.” Anthropology News, February 2005, p. 41.
- Review of Romance on the Global Stage by Nicole Constable. American Anthropologist 106 (4) 2004.
- “Gender and Globalization.” Humanities Exchange. Ohio State University, vol. 17, 11, 2002.
- “Patriarchy: Feminist Theory.” Routledge International Encyclopedia of Women. Cheris Kramarae, Dale Spender, eds. New York/London: Routledge Press, vol 3, 1493–1497, 2000.
- Invited Comments on Graham Fordham, “Northern Thai Male Culture and the Assessment of HIV Risk.” Crossroads 12 (1) 1998: 128-130.
- “Sexualities.” Reading Women’s Lives: An Introduction to Women’s Studies. Needham Heights: Pearson Custom Publishing, 1998.
- Co-author with A. Livingston, “International Perspectives.” Reading Women’s Lives: An Introduction to Women’s Studies. Needham Heights: Pearson Custom Publishing, 1997.
- Review of The Woman in the Body by Emily Martin. Socialist Review 89/3 (autumn) 1989.

== See also ==
- Gender Identities in Thailand
- Culture of Thailand
- Feminization of migration
- Farang
