= Gender inequality in Thailand =

The social and economic changes in Thailand in the past decades have important implications for the quality and quantity of labor. The economic and non-economic roles of women in Thailand can be traced back several hundred years in Thai history, when there were traditional discriminatory attitudes towards women in the culture of Thailand. The transformation of Thailand's social and economic structure since the 1960s led to the gender disparities in Thai society. Recently, the position of Thai women in the labor market has improved a lot in comparison to the past as a result of modernization. In 2011, Thailand ranked 69th out of 143 countries in the Gender Inequality Index. In labor economics, gender inequality is widely discussed in terms of concepts of sex segregation and employment discrimination. Thai government and non-governmental organizations have put forth many policies and programs to address gender inequalities in the last few decades.

== Gender Inequality Index of Thailand ==
Thailand was 69th in global rank of the UNDP's Gender Inequality Index (GII) in 2011 out of 146 countries, with the GII value of 0.382 (where the GII values range from 0 to 1, with 1 representing perfect inequality). The GII has three components that reflect three dimensions of gender inequality: reproductive health, empowerment, and economic activity.

=== Reproductive health ===
Reproductive health is measured by maternal mortality rate and adolescent fertility rate. In 2011, the mortality ratio in Thailand was 48, which implies that for every 100,000 live births, 48 women die from pregnancy-related causes. The adolescent fertility rate was 43.3 birth per 1,000 live births to women ages 15–19 in the same year.

=== Empowerment ===
The share of parliament seats held by women and men and the attainment of secondary and higher education by each gender have been used as measures of empowerment of women, according to the GII. As of 2011, women held 14% of parliament seats, which represents an improvement over the 9.2% held in 2001. In 2011, Yingluck Shinawatra was selected as the first female Prime Minister of Thailand.

In regards to education level, Thai women aged 25 and older who attained at least secondary school educations accounted for 25.6% of the Thai population, compared to 33.7% for men.

Thailand has always offered military roles to Thai women, some 54.55% of women represent the National Human Right Commission and 10% of the National Reconciliation Commission. Thai women have been empowered to serve in the military, assigned roles as negotiators, mediators, and facilitators, as well as involvement in security operations. However, they still remain excluded from playing active roles in armed conflict.

=== Economic activity ===
Economic activity in the GII is measured by labor force participation rate, which is the proportion of the country's working-age population that engages in the labor market. In 2011, the labor force participation rate of Thai women was 65.5% compare to 80.7% of their male counterparts.

== Women labor force participation in Thailand ==
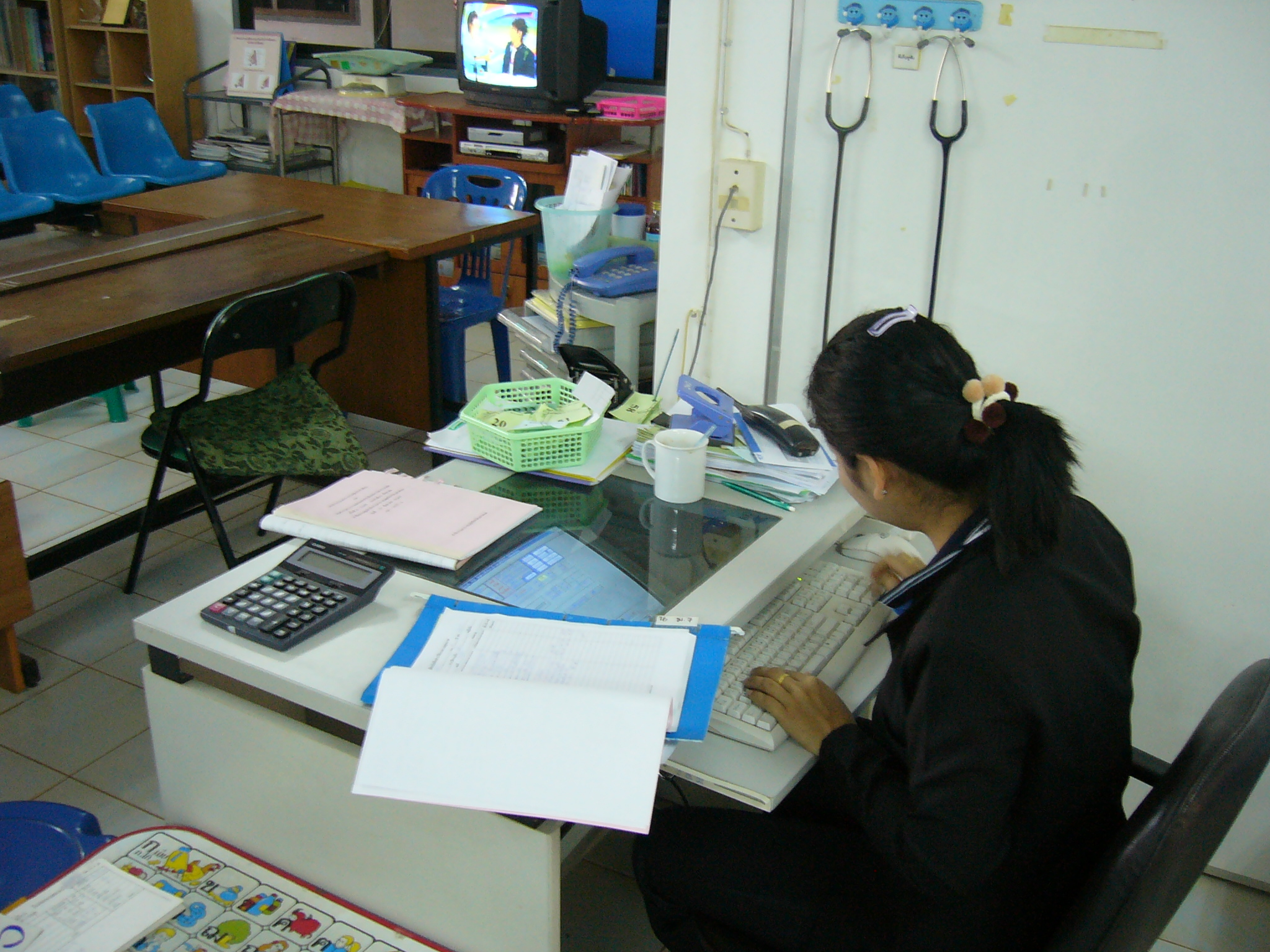
Woman working at Na Wa Public Hospital

Historically, women in Thailand have been active in a variety of economic activities. During the era of Ayutthaya Kingdom (1350-1767), under the sakdina system, every freeman had to be registered as a servant with the local lords, under whom the prime-age men were forced to be away from home to work for the crown or to serve military services. Women were left behind to take care of their families and farms and it became traditional for women to take responsibility for housework and economic activities while men are in charge of economic and political activities. Women and men, together, have continued to have high economic participation since then, which is reflected in the high female labor force participation rate of Thailand, which is one of the highest in the world in the last decade. In 2010, the female labor force participation rate of Thai women over the age of 15 years was reported to be at approximately 64% and in 1990 was reported to be as high as 76% . In 2011, women's labor force participation rate of Thailand was 65.5% while men's labor force participation rate was 80.7%.

Increase in women's labor force participation rate does not mean that women and men are treated equally in the labor market. Increase in participation could be the result of the movement of women unpaid women's work to the paid-productive types. However, if the same contributions of women and men are paid differently, gender inequality still exists. In 2004, the average welfare, measure by individual earnings, of Thai men was estimated to have 8.29% higher than that of women. As Thailand underwent the structural social and economic changes into the modern society in which economic activities are in great conflict with household tasks that remain as the main responsibility of women, Thai women faced new challenges and were opened up to new opportunities to participate in the social and economic development of the country. Overall, Thai women are in a more disadvantaged economic position than men in the labor market as demonstrated by their concentration in low-paid, low-skilled occupations, opposite to those of men.

Gender norms in Thai society are one of the main sources of discrimination against women in the labor market. There is an idiom in Thai says that “สามีเป็นช้างเท้าหน้า ภรรยาเป็นช้างเท้าหลัง” which translates as “The husband is the fore leg of the elephant. The wife is the hind leg”, implying that men are the leaders and women are the followers in Thai society. Traditionally, daughters are prepared to be mothers and followers while sons are prepared to be leaders and in the workplaces women are given second priority for education, on-the-job training and promotion.

== Employment segregation by gender in Thailand ==
Thailand's economic transformation from an agricultural to an industrial economy in the 1960s reduced the demand for labor on farms and, in the meantime, increased the demand for unskilled labor in the factories. As a result, unskilled female laborers migrate from poor rural areas to the urban areas to work for minimum wages or less, as can be seen in female workers tendency to concentrate in low-paid, low-skilled occupations.

In 2011, the majority of Thai women labor force concentrated in agricultural, wholesale and retail trade, and manufacturing sectors, which employed approximately 39.17%, 16.22% and 14.63% of the total female labor force, respectively, in comparison to 69.6%, 8.1% and 2.3%, respectively in 1980. These figures demonstrate the large-scale reallocation of women workers from the agricultural sector to the retail trade and manufacturing sectors.

In 2011, women accounted for 46.21% of the total employment rate. Most of this employment was in informal activities. Out of the total female labor force, 62.49% were occupied in the informal sector, which was nearly identical to the proportion of male workers who were employed in the informal sector.

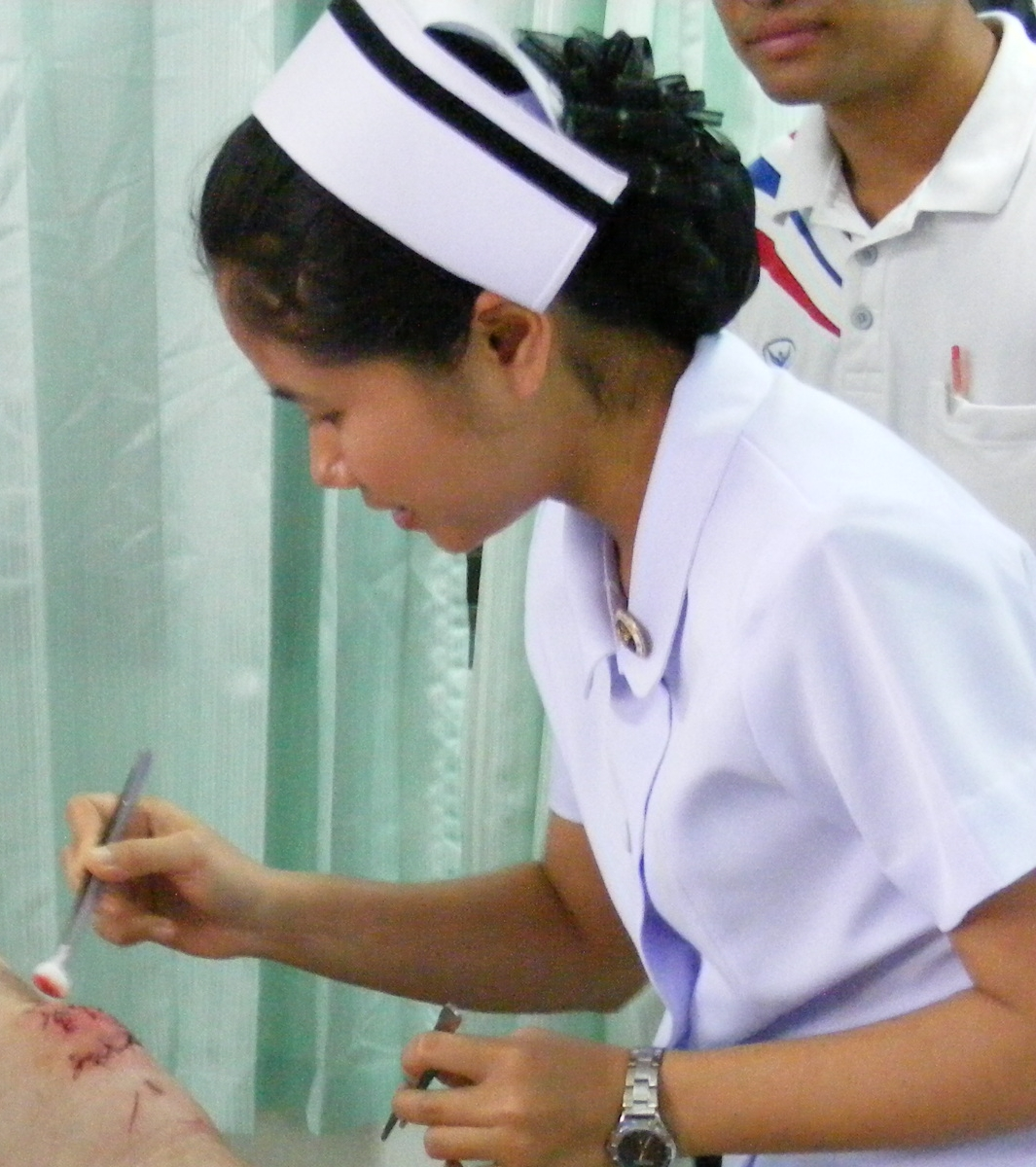
Thai nurse in Na Wa Public Hospital

The types of job occupied by each sex are also different. The industries/occupations that Thai men dominated include:

- Agricultural (55.8%)
- Mining and quarrying (83.6%)
- Public administration and defense (64.0%)
- Water supply (69.7%)
- Construction (84.6%)
- Transportation storage (86.9%)
- Information and communication (64.8%)
- Professional, Scientific and technical (52.4%)
- Administrative and support services (57.7%)
- Electricity, gas, stream supply industry (81.17%).

The numbers in the parentheses show the number of men workers as a percentage of the total employment in each industry (occupation) as of 2011.

Women were, in contrast, occupied in the industries/occupations such as:

- Accommodation and food service (64.2%)
- Financial and insurance activities (55.5%)
- Real estate activities (55.7%)
- Education (61.1%)
- Human health and social work (75.9%)
- Activities of household employers (82.1%)
- Activities in international organizations (100.0%)
- Other service activity industry (55.3%).

The numbers in the parentheses show the number of women workers as a percentage of the total employment in each industry (occupation) as of 2011.

In summary, in 2011 male workers were heavily employed in the transportation, mining, and building trades while female workers were largely employed in clerical and service occupations.

Occupational segregation by sex is widely associated with gender wage disparity. As elsewhere, men's jobs in Thailand are mostly blue-collar jobs, which require specific skills with higher pay, while women's jobs are mostly white-collar jobs. After controlling for the effects of the differences in education, work experience and location, that may reflect the income disparity between men and women, the study of Son (2011) indicates that wage pays largely contribute to the income disparity between men and women.

As of 2011, almost a third of women in the labor force were unpaid family workers, in contrast to 16% of men. Out of the total female labor force, 50.78% are engaged in the informal sector. Many of these workers work part-time or are temporarily employed in family businesses. In 2000, 7.5% of employed female workers were reported to work as part-time workers. As of the first quarter of 2012, 43.93% of Thai women, beside those who were too young or too old, were out of the labor force because of household duties and 22.21% were students.

Preference of workers and cultural factors that lead to job segregation are the causes of gendered wage disparity as well. The labor markets are embedded with societal gender norms that shape the preferences of employers and workers on choices of jobs that are appropriate to each sex.

== Gender wage disparity in Thailand ==
The gender wage differentials in Thailand declined in the early 1990s. The trend reversed after the 1997 Asian financial crisis. The main source of the existing differentials is discrimination. As of 2007, among non-agricultural sector workers in Thailand, women received 92% of the average wage of men compared to 65.4% in 1990. Women's wages in the manufacturing sector as of 2008 were 80% of men's and were 72% in 2000.

As Darity and Mason (1998) point out, the potential sources of the narrowing of the gender wage gap are a comparative decline in men's wages to women's wages; an increase in the human capital of women; and the legal pressure against discrimination. The difference in work experience is also an important cause of gender pay gap. In Thailand, the gender wage differential is larger when experience premiums are accounted for. Men with work experience receive significantly higher wages than women with the same work experience. This implies gender wage discrimination.

There seems to have no gender wage gap by the convergence of the trends of raw averages of female and male hourly wages. However, after controlling for socioeconomic and demographic characteristics, women continue to earn less than men by 16 percent in 2013.

== Education attainment of Thai women ==
Education is one of the major contributors that affect the labor market gender disparity in Thailand. The narrowing of the gender gap in Thailand from 1985-2005 was mainly the result of a narrowing of the gender education gap due to a substantial increase in Thai women's education.

The secondary school enrollment rate of women was 78.44% in 2011, up from 13.45% in 1973, whereas the secondary school enrollment rate of men was 69.86% in 2011 and 17.71 in 1973. As of 2008, Thai female students were 54.28% of the total enrollment in higher education. Out of all female students, 18.93% were enrolled in higher education, in comparison to 14.43% of all male students. Thai women are also enrolled at the master's degree level at a slightly higher rate than men, at 1.42 to 1.13%, but slightly lower than men at the doctorate level, 0.125 percent to 0.129%. Thai women have invested in human capital more than men in the 2000s. The higher education level of Thai women reduces the gender education gap in Thailand.

However, in 2002, more men than women in every level of education, except those with doctoral degree, earned income of more than 10,000 Thai baht per month. Almost 35% of men received income of more than 10,000 Thai baht per month in comparison to 23% of women who did, regardless of education level. Among the ultra-poor in the labor market, women appear to have higher education than men on average.

Empirical results suggest that although education tends to reduce segregation and discrimination against women in Thailand, it increases inequality in earnings between male and female workers. In Thailand, education level reduces total gender income disparity by 7.04%, which comes from 10.63% reduction in segregation, 0.44% reduction in discrimination and 4.04% increase in inequality. Although gender wage gap still exists, the modernization has shaped the beliefs about women's education and currently status of female workers in the labor market is improved in comparison to the past in various aspects such as wages, working conditions and opportunities.

== Problems in workplace faced by Thai women workers ==
In 2011, women and men workers in Thailand worked a relatively similar number of hours per week, except that 37.08% of men worked 50 hours or more in comparison to 33.31% of women. However, 27.55% of female workers complained that they worked too hard. 90.99% of the complaints from women workers in 2011 were that they received low pay in comparison to a 52.36% of complaints from male workers, 5.05% reported that they had no holidays and 13.15% reported that they did not receive any form of work benefits.

Another problem of labor market inequality is that women workers might face a “glass ceiling’’ in the workplace, which limits the opportunity of women to be promoted to higher positions and contributes to the gender wage gap. In 2007, only 22.2% of the executive positions in the civil service were held by women, up from 9.9% in 1992.

== Government policies on gender inequality ==
National awareness about concerns and issues of women in Thailand have been raised since 1975 when Thailand participated in the First United Nations (UN) World Conference on Women in Mexico City and joined the world community in recognition of the Decade of Women in 1976. The National Commission of Women’s Affairs (NCWA) was established in 1989. The NCWA Board has thirty members and consists of experts in the area related to women's development as well as representatives from major non-government organizations (NGOs), government agencies, community organizations and the elite society whereas the Prime Minister is formally the chairperson.

The national committee was set up to prepare the first long-term Women Development Plan, which covered the period 1982-2001. Women had been one of the target groups in Thailand's Fourth National Economic and Social Development Plan between 1977-1981 and the long-term plan for International Agendas for Women in Development (WID) was then incorporated into the National Economic and Social Development Plans, starting in 1982 with the Fifth Plan. The first long-term plan was revised in order to adapt to the current situation and the second long-term plan, known as “The Perspective Plan (1992-2011)’’, was released and became the basis of the short-term Five-year Women Development Plans corresponding to the Seventh and the Eighth Five-year National Economic and Social Development Plans.

The goal of the short-term plans is to enable women to fully develop their potential; to become valued human resources; to enjoy a good quality of life; and to participate in every aspect of their country's development which could be achieved by eliminating all forms of discrimination, exploitation, and violence and providing necessary protection to women. The broad objectives of the plans are to improve political and economic opportunities for women by enhancing their skills; to encourage women to be involved in decision-making processes; and to create a supportive environment for the employment of women without discrimination and inequality. The strategies to achieve these objectives are to launch programs that will develop the skill of the middle- and higher-level workers in quality, quantity, and efficiency and to increase gender equity by affirmative actions among the lower level workers that are the majority of women workforce.

Documents from the National Commission on Women's Affairs that are relevant to WID include: Perspective Policies and Planning for the Development of Women (1992-2011), National Declaration on Women (1992), 1990 Gender Statistics, Thailand's Report on the Status of Women and Platform for Action (1994), Thailand's Combined Second and Third Report to the Committee on the Elimination of Discrimination Against Women (1996), and Women Development Plan during the period of the Eight National Economic and Social Development Plan (1997-2001).

Thailand is one of the founding members of International Labour Organization (ILO), which formed in 1961. The country has ratified 15 ILO Conventions, one of which is the core convention related to gender inequality (C100 on equal remuneration). Also, Thailand has been a member of the Convention on the Elimination of All Forms of Discrimination Against Women (CEDAW) since 1995. The implementation of the CEDAW and the Beijing Platform for Action (BPFA) have had a visible impact on the Thai's legislation in the aspects of women protection and the progress toward gender equality in the country. The legal changes that reflect gender sensitivity and women's human rights include the enactment of the Protection of Domestic Violence Victims Act (2007), the amendment made to the Penal Code to prevent women from being raped by their own spouse, and the indications of gender inequality are also implemented in the recent constitutions.

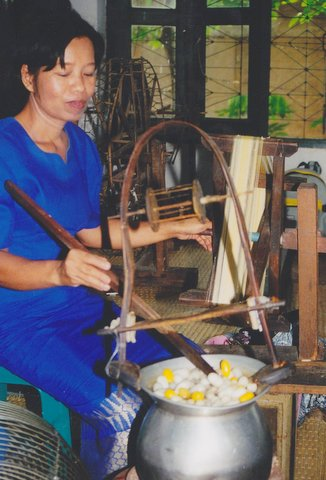
A woman from Thailand boils the cocoons of silkworm in the initial phase of making silk

Besides the National Commission on Women's Affairs, other organizations such as the National Council of Women of Thailand, the YWCA, the Council of Social Welfare, the Association for the Promotion of the Status of Women, and the Appropriate Technology Association have played important roles in solving the problems of gender inequality.

In regards to discrimination against women, the Ministry of Interior announced a regulation on 16 April 1972 in which Section 26 of Chapter 4 of the act requires employers to pay men and women with the same tasks equally. The policies to reduce employment discrimination against women were imposed to allow women to work in formerly prohibited positions. These policies imply the government's visions against gendered pay discrimination and the willingness to reduce discrimination of the government, although in practice there still exists discrimination against women in the form of employment and promotion.

To enhance employment opportunities for women, the Thai government established the Department of Skills Development under the Ministry of Labor and Social Welfare in 1992. The main objective of the department is to improve skills of female workers (new labor-market entrants, current workers, and rural workers) by offering programs with the help of many NGOs that provide basic knowledge and on-the-job training. These programs mostly come from the requests of employers or the workers themselves through surveys generated by the department. As a result, the program can also lower the shortage of specific-skills required workers at the same time. In addition, the Department of Agricultural Extension, Ministry of Agriculture and Cooperatives which focuses on home economics trainings for women also has been supporting women in agricultural sector so that they become efficient workers and increase their income which will reduce the difference between them and other group of women in the society. Various groups of home production are formed locally (e.g. mulberry production, silk weaving, handicraft making, food processing) in which knowledge and experience are shared between group members. The department also provides Agricultural Housewives Funds to encourage income-generating activities and to educate women on how to access to financial resources with low interest for their business activities expansion.

For women workers' protection, Ministry of Interior, has been trying to enhance ability to increase family income of women. One chapter in the Ministry's announcement in 1972 is devoted to women's employment with the aim of protecting women from overly heavy or dangerous types of work and to increase welfare of women, especially benefits related to maternity such as maternity leave and position reallocation due to health conditions. In addition to 30 days of annual sick leave, women are allowed for maternal leave with pays for periods of 60 days (which was later adjusted to 90 days) including holidays if she has been employed for not less than 180 days. These protection policies, however, could lead to further discrimination as they increase the cost of employing women workers so the employees might hire women at the lower pay than men.

== See also ==
- Feminism in Thailand
