= Association for the Promotion of the Status of Women =

- สมาคมส่งเสริมสถานภาพสตรี
- Abbreviation: APSW
- Pronunciation: Samakom Songserm Sthanaparb Satri
- Predecessor: Status of Women Promotion Group (SWPG)
- Established: 1974
- Founder: Khunying Kanitha Wichiencharoen
- Type: Women's rights association
- Headquarters: Bangkok

The Association for the Promotion of the Status of Women (APSW) is a women's right organization based in Thailand.

== History of APSW ==
APSW began as a pressure group consisting of less privileged women like labourers, low-skilled workers, prostitutes, and poor migrants in Bangkok. The organization was an offshoot of earlier organization, the Association of Women Lawyers of Thailand (AWL). In 1972, Khunying Kanitha Wichiencharoen formed the Status of Women Promotion Group (SWPG) for other women in professional jobs such as physicians, nurses, and teachers to join the working class group. The group was able to form a clause stating that men and women have equal rights after the rewrite of the Constitution.

== Initiatives ==
Among the initiatives the group has done over the years include a emergency shelter for women and children, The Jimmy-Rosalynn Carter Women's Clinic and Nursery, the Kanitnaree Center for rape victims, The Sasakawa Women’s Education and Training Center and youth camps.

== Impact and recognition ==
On 21 June 1987, former U.S President Jimmy Carter and his wife Rosalynn Carter officiated the founding ceremony of the We-Train Center. Carter donated ฿1,000,000 for the construction of the Women's Clinic.
