= Gender identities in Thailand =

In Thailand, one can find several different gender roles, identities and diverse visual markers of masculinity and femininity. Beyond the traditional male and female roles, there are categories for individuals who are gender non-conforming, whether in looks or behavior. These are generally regarded as sub-types of each sex, rather than a distinct gender identity, and correlate strongly with homosexuality. Demand and support for positive self-identity is growing in Thailand.

== Heterosexual ==
=== Male ===
A heterosexual male is the only sexuality, which refers not just to physical sex but gender identity as well. Note this may differ from Western ideas of heterosexual male, to which lesbian sex has been eroticized. This means he seeks a traditional Thai female, but does not accept as a sexual or marriage partner the other female gender identities listed below.

=== Female ===
A heterosexual female refers to the traditional female who seeks the traditional heterosexual male (man) in Thai society.

== Tom-Dee identity ==
=== Tom identity ===
A "tom" (ทอม), from the English word tomboy, is a female who dresses, acts, and possibly speaks in a masculine fashion. She may not identify as a lesbian, but she may be perceived as one by others. Toms wear short hair, a deviation from Thai tradition which has prized long hair as a sign of feminine beauty since a Europeanization of customs during the Victorian era (while short hair was the norm for Central Thai women until c. 1900).

Women usually wear skirts in Thailand, and in many government offices skirts are compulsory and pant suits banned. Toms dress in men's clothing—slacks, sandals, and loose fitting button-down shirts. According to Ara Wilson, a tom will use male speech terms, especially the old, now-crude pronouns goo (Thai: กู) for "I", and mueng (Thai: มึง) for "you".

=== Dee identity ===
The "dee" (ดี้), from the English word lady, is a homosexual (or bisexual) female who follows outward Thai gender norms. A dee will look, act, and speak in a manner congruent with Thai female gender norms. The only difference between dees and traditional females is that dee often engage in relationships with toms. Some dees, however, seek other dees.

=== Tom-dee within society ===
Heterosexual public displays of affection are frowned upon in Thai culture. However, minor displays of affection, such as hand-holding, between same sex individuals is considered the norm. In this way tom-dee partnerships can be invisible to the wider society.

=== Tom Gay ===
A Tom Gay is a Tom who is attracted to all 3 types of women: heterosexual women, Toms, and Dees.

=== Lesbian ===
A lesbian in Thai culture differs from the West, i.e. a woman who is attracted to the traditional gender adhering Thai female.

=== Female roles vis a vis identity ===
Within the female community, there are roles which complicate identity. Particular among them are one-way and two-way, which refer to the perceived permanent sexual roles of giver and receiver and giver, respectively, but taking on a broader meaning than merely sex. A 1-way tom would see it fit to take care of the female both materially (pay for everything) and psychologically, but not accept the same in return. Conversely, the terms king and queen refer to active or receptive roles, yet can also be situational rather than an identity. The same terms king and queen are used for male homosexual roles. Toms may seek dees or toms (in which case they may be referred to as Tom Gay Kings), toms may be 1-way or 2-way. Dees may seek toms or dees.

=== Adam ===
An Adam is a male who is attracted to Toms.

== Kathoeys ==
Although the terms "kathoey" or "ladyboy" are rather ambiguous, simply put, both terms refer to someone born a male, but who dresses as and adopts the mannerisms and identity of a woman. Though the term is often translated as "transgender", the term is rarely used in Thailand. Instead Thais use the term kathoey. This term can now also be used to refer to any male homosexual and was originally used to refer to intersex people. Due to this term becoming so broad, many choose to use the English word to explain a homosexual male dressing as a woman as a "ladyboy". The term can also be meant as an insult, especially to those who are trying to alter or openly express their identity, as it suggests that they are still men who are merely dressed as women. The term is used rather loosely at times and can be used to refer to any male who possesses traditionally 'feminine' qualities. Most kathoeys prefer to call themselves "a transformed goddess" or "a second type of woman".

=== Acceptance of kathoeys ===
Kathoeys are numerous in Thailand and are seemingly accepted by society, not only in the cities but in the countryside as well. Thai Buddhism does not specifically regard homosexuality as a sin and has no specific prohibitions regarding the orientation. However, kathoeys are still only begrudgingly accepted in many corners of Thai society. Kathoey have not yet attained equal status with those who are not transgender, and restrictions come with the identity. Kathoey cannot officially change their birth sex on birth certificates or passports, meaning they historically couldn't marry someone of the same sex (even if they identify with a different gender), though this has now changed with the legalisation of same sex marriage.

Though kathoeys have experienced some prestige in the past, they still face many struggles in everyday life. Many have found success in the entertainment business or in fashion, while others dance cabaret or accept lower level work so that they are able to live their lives in the open. Beginning in the 1950s, the existence of kathoeys began to be acknowledged, which can be seen in the media of the time. The trend of kathoeys being a regular part of entertainment such as movies, music entertainment, and television shows is rather recent.

=== Angee ===
A kathoey who is attracted to Toms.

== See also ==
- Hijra (South Asia)
- List of transgender-related topics
- Hermaphrodite
- Bishōnen
- Butch and Femme
