= P.C. Air =

Charter airline of Thailand, 2010–2012

IATA	ICAO	Call sign
GT	PCA	PIYO AIR
- Founded: 2010
- Ceased operations: 2012
- Hubs: Suvarnabhumi Airport
- Fleet size: 1
- Website: pcairline.com

P.C. Air was a short-lived Thai charter airline based at Suvarnabhumi Airport that operated from 2010 to 2012.

== History ==
The airline was founded by Khun Peter Chan ("P.C.") in 2010. In January 2012, the PC Air's sole aircraft was impounded at South Korea's Incheon International Airport, leaving its passengers without alternative transport. The airline sued its Korean sales agent, Skyjet, and oil company Jae Sin for 1.5 billion baht in compensation for damage to its reputation. Despite attempts to find an investor, the airline ceased operations entirely in the same year after this incident.

PC Air was the first airline in Thailand to hire Transgender flight attendants, they only selected four out of hundreds of applicants based on strict criteria and background check.

The aircraft belonging to PC Air is now at Rajamangala University (Pathumthani, Thailand) being renovated in preparation for being used as a training aid for students in the aviation engineering department.

== Fleet ==
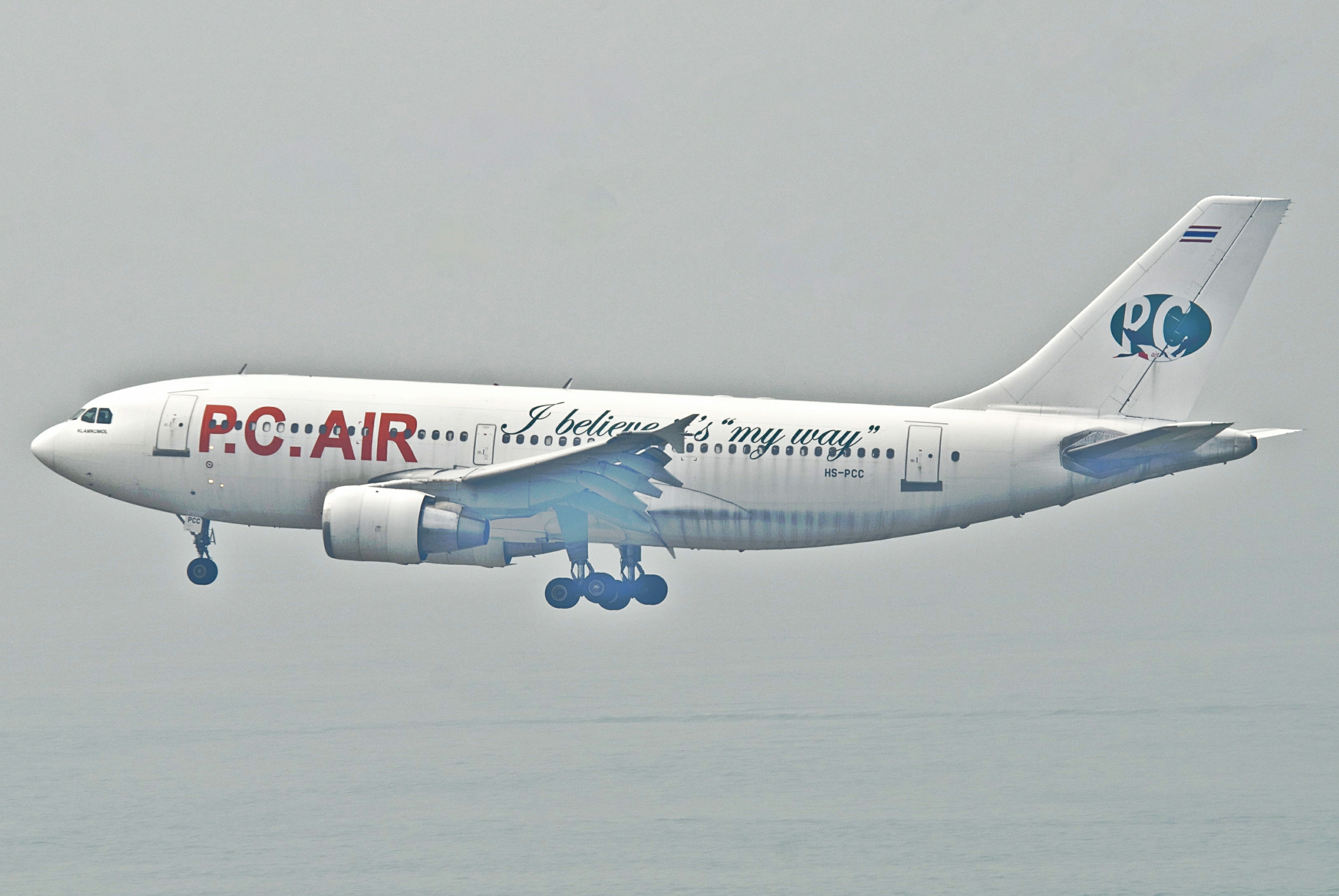
P.C. Air Airbus A310-200

As of November 2012, the P.C. Air fleet consisted of the following aircraft:

- 1 Airbus A310-200
