= Kanitha Wichiencharoen =

Thai lawyer and women's rights advocate

Khunying Kanitha Wichiencharoen
- กนิษฐา วิเชียรเจริญ
- Born: Kanitha Samsen; 4 November 1922; Bangkok, Siam
- Died: 13 May 2002 (aged 81); Bangkok, Thailand
- Other name: Kanittha Wichiencharoen
- Occupations: lawyer, women's rights activist, Buddhist nun
- Years active: 1945–2002
- Known for: establishing the first Thai emergency shelter for women

Khunying Kanitha Wichiencharoen (4 November 1922 – 13 May 2002) was a Thai lawyer and women's rights advocate until late in life when she became a maechee. Most noted for her human rights work with women, she established the first emergency shelter for women in Thailand and wrote legislation to protect women's rights. She established the Mahapajapati Theri College, the first college to train women as Buddhist nuns in southeast Asia.

== Early life ==
Kanitha Samsen was born on 4 November 1922 in Bangkok, in the Kingdom of Siam to Thanom and Mangorn Samsen. She was one of two daughters of the couple and her father was a well-known lawyer, who served as a senator during the transition to a constitutional monarchy. Her parents encouraged both Kanitha and her sister, Kanok, in their education. Samsen began her studies at St. Francis Xavier Convent School and later attended St. Yoseph Convent School, before enrolling in law school at Thammasat University. After working for two years as a counselor with women who had suffered abuse and discrimination, Samsen moved to Washington, D. C. to study international law at American University and Columbia University in New York City. She then moved to Switzerland and studied international relations at the Graduate Institute of International and Development Studies for the year in 1949.

== Career ==
Returning to Bangkok, Samsen took a job at the Ministry of Foreign Affairs, where she met Adul Wichiencharoen, whom she would marry in 1950 and with whom she would subsequently have three children: Aim, Anik, and Art. In 1953, Wichiencharoen returned to the United States to study social welfare at Howard University in Washington, D. C. Upon her graduation, in 1955, she returned to Thailand and worked as a supervisor at the Standard Vacuum Oil Company. She also worked for USAID and then as the legal advisor to the Tourist Authority. In 1961, she began a three-year term as president of the Women Lawyer's Association of Thailand, traveling abroad as her duties required. As she visited other countries, she sought out women's shelters, intent on finding ways to improve services to women. She also instituted Saturday workshops where women lawyers gave pro bono legal advice to the public as a way of offering community assistance. Becoming the executive secretary of the Thai-American Technical Cooperation Association in 1963, she would serve in that capacity for the organization for the next twenty-one years. In addition, she advised as a legal counselor to the United Nations, various developmental NGOs and the petroleum industry.

In 1969, Wichiencharoen was selected as president of the International Women's Association of Thailand. Participating in the Thai women's rights movement actively throughout the 1970s, in 1974, Wichiencharoen became a founder of The Association for the Promotion of the Status of Women (APSW). The association, made up of both women and men began campaigning to revise and amend laws to provide better protections for women and children. She served as president of the organization and simultaneously became chair of the National Council of Women's standing committee on Women and Labor. Because there were no facilities available in Thailand to assist abused, unemployed and elderly women, Wichiencharoen opened her home to serve as an emergency shelter. When the police did not know what to do with endangered women, they brought them to her. She traveled extensively studying the situation of women around the world, participating in numerous conferences and academic experiences, such as a 1961 study of the family and youth courts of Japan; a 1977 assessment of the Australian family court and women’s shelters; a 1979 study tour which included observations at the Kansas City Women's Center, shelters in San Francisco and Washington, D.C., and a rape crisis center in New York; 1987 participation in the Federation of Soviet Women Congress in Prague; 1988 lecturer at the Nordic forum and Swedish Women’s Association, among many others.

In 1980, in response to needs identified by the Lawyer's Association, Wichiencharoen began a funding drive to establish a permanent women's shelter. Raising ฿50,000 ($2,000 US), APSW set up a shelter in the building of the Lawyer's association, offering housing, meals and medical referrals. The first women's shelter in Thailand, the Emergency Home and Relief Fund for Women and Children in Distress overflowed with clients. By 1986, they had outgrown their original space and opened a second and then a third home in the Donmuang District of Bangkok. Recognizing that their assistance was being provided after-the-fact, Wichiencharoen began raising funds to open an educational facility. The Women's Education and Training Center (WE-TRAIN), providing educational as well as vocational training, was established in 1988. Long wanting to develop a clinic to assist with pregnant women, in response to the growing needs of women after the HIV/AIDS epidemic was identified in the 1980s, a clinic was finally established.

In 1990, Wichiencharoen founded a policy research center to analyze and advise on socio-economic and political issues impacting women's lives. The Gender and Development Research Institute (GDRI), was established as an NGO, and works across the spectrum of social class to improve the welfare of women. Long aware of the discrepancies in the Buddhist faith regarding women in the ministry, and the subservience required of nuns to monks, Wichiencharoen became ordained as a maechee or "lay nun" in Sri Lanka in 1993. Keeping her title, khunying, the equivalent of the British dame, she received criticism from the media, but because the king had bestowed the title and failure to use it would be a sign of disrespect, she took the name Maechee Khunying Kanitha. As she was still involved in the advocacy work of APSW, she also did not choose to live in the samnak chii with the other nuns, but established a separate cottage where she lived with a few other members of the community. In 1996, she drew up and lobbied for passage of the Nun's Bill of Rights advocating that women in religious orders should have political autonomy protected by law and have sole authority for allocating their funding ad determining ordination or censure of members. Though the bill failed, she continued to press for measures to improve the perceptions and opportunities of nuns. In 1999, Maechee Khunying Kanitha, working with the Thai Nun's Institute and APSW founded the first college, Mahapajapati Theri College, to offer women a Bachelor of Arts degree in Buddhism and philosophy.

== Death and legacy ==
Wichiencharoen died on 13 May 2002 from cancer. She is recognized as a pioneer of women's rights advocacy in Thailand In 1990, at the festivities held at the Sorbonne in honor of International Women's Day, Wichiencharoen was honored as an outstanding advocate for women and in 1995, she received an honorary doctorate in Philosophy, Sociology and Anthropology from Ramkhamhaeng University.
