= Yollada Suanyot =

Thai politician

- ยลลดา เกริกก้อง สวนยศ
- Born: Krerkkong Suanyot; June 18, 1977 (age 49); Nan, Thailand

Yollada "Nok" Suanyot (Thai: ยลลดา เกริกก้อง "นก" สวนยศ, RTGS: Yonlada Kroekkong "Nok" Suanyot; born June 18, 1977), nicknamed Yollie, is a Thai politician and celebrity in Thailand known for her multiple television appearances. On May 27, 2012, she was elected to represent Mueang Nan District on the Provincial Administration Organization for Nan Province in Thailand, running as an independent politician. Previous to entering politics, Suanyot had been a model, She won the Photogenic award at the Elite Model Look Thailand 2003 and, on the beauty pageant stage, she represented Thailand at Miss Tourism International 2001, where she received the Best National Costume award under the name Hassadee Budtriwong. She was the former winner of the ‘Miss Alcazar 2005’ Beauty Queen Contest and was a member of Sony-BMG Thailand the pop group Venus Flytrap, where she performed of the lead singer under the name "Nok". The famous songs include "Visa For Love" and "Cause I'm Your Lady." Later she join the 2nd pop band "Papillion" by IM Music. with the unreleased song "Dangerous".

Suanyot is a transgender woman. She underwent gender-affirming surgery to align with her female identity at the age of 16. She is a published writer of her own books Katoey (Trans) and Puying (Women), She founded and chairs the TransFemale Association of Thailand, which advocates for transgender rights. One of the most popular projects of her association is a reality TV show offering free gender reassignment surgeries called Sister's Hand Because of the lack of legal recognition for transgender people in Thailand, her birth name appeared on the ballot.

Suanyot graduated with a science degree from Thammasat University when she was 21, as well as 2nd bachelor's degrees in Humanities Mass Communication, holds a master's degree in political science, and is currently working toward a Ph.D. in social science at Ramkhamhaeng University. In her personal life, Suanyot and trans man Ronnakrit "Sam" Hamichart have been in a relationship for more than 11 years, and are known as the first trans couple in Thailand.

Suanyot was once the executive of Jewelry Channel, Thailand's first jewelry shopping channel. She also sponsored the diamond crown for the Miss Thailand pageant in 2010. Later, she took on the role of managing director at JKN Channel, a subsidiary company of JKN Global Media, with Anne Jakkrajuthatip as the CEO. Both, along with JenJen Boonsungnoen, founded the Transgender Inspiration Foundation to provide scholarships and support for transgender individuals in the field of education in Thailand.

Suanyot has returned to the entertainment industry as the winner of Miss Fabulous Thailand Season 3 in 2024. She is currently appointed by the Ministry of Social Development and Human Security as one of the 10 members of the Discrimination Based on Gender Advisory Committee.
