= Orapin Chaiyakan =

Thai schoolteacher; first woman to be elected to National Assembly (1949)

- อรพิน ไชยกาล
- Born: 6 May 1904; Ubon Ratchathani, Siam
- Died: 1 January 1996 (aged 91); Bangkok, Thailand
- Occupations: Politician; teacher
- Known for: First woman elected to the Parliament of Thailand
- Political party: Democrat Party

Orapin Chaiyakan (Thai: อรพิน ไชยกาล) (born May 6, 1904) was a Thai politician and teacher. She was born in Ubon Ratchathani, studied education in Bangkok, and served as headteacher of Narinukun School from 1924 to 1940. She was the first woman to be elected to hold a post in the Parliament of Thailand. Specifically, she was elected to become a member of the House of Representatives of Thailand on June 5, 1949. She was elected as a representative for Ubon Ratchathani Province. She was a member of the Democrat Party.
