= Women's Association of Siam =

The Women's Association of Siam, later known as the Thai Women's Association of Thailand, was a women's organization in Thailand founded in 1932.

It was the first women's association dedicated to women's rights in Thailand.

Its purpose was to unite women and women's learning, and it also provided courses for women.
