= Le Fort =

Le Fort, as a surname, can refer to:

== Surname ==
- Léon Clément Le Fort (1829–1893), French surgeon
- René Le Fort (1869–1951), French surgeon
- François Le Fort (16th century), French merchant
- François Jacques Le Fort (Frants Yakovlevich Lefort; 1656–1699), Russian general admiral (1695), and close associate of Tsar Peter the Great.
- Gertrud von Le Fort (1876–1971), German writer
- Ricardo Le Fort (born 1965), Argentine rugby union coach

== Other uses ==
- Le Fort fracture (disambiguation)
- Le Fort osteotomy
- Le Fort III (disambiguation)
- Lefort, a surname
- Lefortovo (disambiguation)
