= Condylar hypoplasia =

Condylar hypoplasia is known as underdevelopment of the mandibular condyle. Congenitally (primary) caused condylar hypoplasia leads to underdeveloped condyle at birth. Hypoplasia of mandible can be diagnosed during birth, in comparison to the hyperplasia which is only diagnosed later in growth of an individual.

== Types ==
=== Congenital (primary) ===
Congenital condylar hypoplasia happens when a person is born with smaller condyle than normal. The small condyle can be present either one or both sides of the lower jaw. This type of condition usually happens as part of systemic diseases such as Hemifacial microsomia, Mandibulofacial Dysostosis, Goldenhar syndrome, Hurler syndrome, Proteus syndrome and Morquio syndrome.

=== Acquired (secondary) ===
Acquired condylar hypoplasia happens when a person is not born with a small condyle but they sustain an injury during their growth which leads to this condition. The injury causes stop of growth in the condyle, resulting in a smaller condyle. The type of injuries that can happen are most traumatic in nature. Injury or infection related to ear, childhood rheumatoid arthritis and parathyroid hormone related deficiency are known to cause the injury.

== Presentation ==
Individuals with condylar hypoplasia may present with small mandible, symmetry in lower jaw and increased overjet. Depending on the presence or absence of the condyle, an individual may have limited opening of the mouth.

== Treatment ==
Treatment of this condyle usually requires a multi-team approach involving an oral surgeon, an orthodontist and a plastic surgeon. A treatment usually involves some type of bone graft from one's own body to their low jaw. A costochondral bone graft has been successfully used to add bone to the mandible by oral and plastic surgeons. This type of graft can be lengthened by a procedure known as distraction osteogenesis which adds bone to the already placed graft. The graft is usually placed before the growth spurt occurs in an individual. The graft placement is later followed by an orthognathic surgery after the growth has finished in an individual.

== See also ==
- Condylar hyperplasia
- Craniofacial team
- Distraction osteogenesis
- Hemifacial microsomia
