= Le Fort III osteotomy =

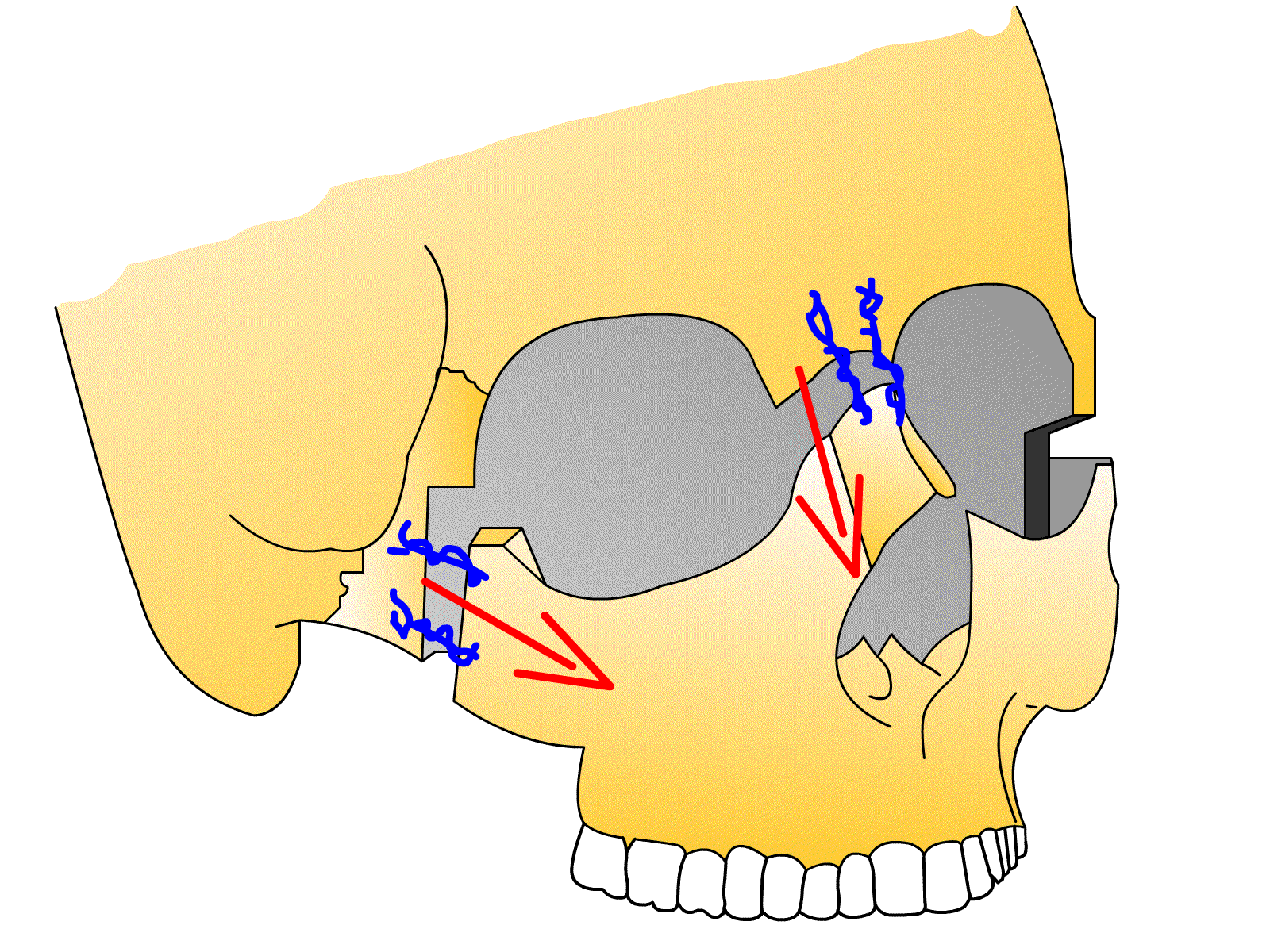
- Illustration demonstrating Le Fort III osteotomy and distraction advancement

Le Fort III osteotomy is a surgical procedure primarily used to correct growth failure or other deformity of the mid-face involving the upper jaw (maxilla), nose, cheek bones (zygoma), and portions of the orbits. It is a type of orthagnathic surgery typically conducted by plastic, craniofacial, and/or oral and maxillofacial surgeons. The surgery is typically completed in patients with craniofacial deformities, but is also utilized following facial traumas and for aesthetics.

== History ==
Le fort osteotomies originate with the 1901 description of common human-skull fracture patterns by René Le Fort. Following these principles, the Le Fort III procedure was initially described by Dr. Harold Gillies in 1950 and then further developed by Dr. Paul Tessier in the late 1960s in a series of patients with various craniofacial deformities. Originally described alongside several other operative techniques for manipulation of the bones forming and surrounding the orbit, the Le Fort III osteotomy has since been refined as a technique for correcting defects of the midface.

The modern Le Fort III has been influenced by adjacent clinical and technical advancements. The procedure may include parallel techniques such as distraction osteogenesis to further assist in correcting severe defects of the skull. Le Fort III osteotomy may also be combined with other Le Fort procedures such as the Le Fort I ostoetomy in order to more effectively treat specific deformity of the skull. Modification of incision sites has also expanded the ability of surgeons to reach the desired operative site through fewer, selectively placed sites. Modern surgical ingress is namely via bitemporal, transconjunctival, and transoral incisions. Incorporation of pre-operative 3D visualization techniques virtual planning has also aided modern streamlining of the procedure.

As the majority of patients undergoing Le Fort III osteotomy have a craniofacial deformity, concurrent treatment for the dental misalignment (most commonly class III malocclusion), nasal airway function, and other comorbidities frequently co-occurs with this procedure. Because of the multifactorial issues faced by patients presenting for Le Fort III osteotomies, patients may be addressed by multidisciplinary teams including plastic, oral and maxillofacial, pediatric, and other specialists.

== Relevant anatomy ==
The Le Fort III osteotomy involves separation of the midface entirely from the rest of the bony skull. This includes the maxilla, nasal bone, the inferior orbit, and the zygomatic bones. Separation of the midface is achieved through a transverse osteotomy.

Several arteries provide blood supply to the midface, with branches of the facial artery, namely the ascending pharyngeal artery, serving as the primary source. Branches of the ophthalmic artery such as the anterior ethmoidal artery also supply areas within the midface and may be interacted with during surgery depending on the degree of bony manipulation needed.

Innervation of the mobilized segment includes two primary sources. Sensation is primarily derived from the maxillary nerve, with the cranial nerve segment V_{2} largely supplying sensation to the maxilla, and the areas overlying the zygoma and inferior to the orbit. The bony nasal segment is primarily supplied sensation by the V1 segment of the maxillary nerve. Depending on the degree of access required around the orbit, the ophthalmic artery (CN II) may be visualized by surgeons.

== Indications ==
The Le Fort III osteotomy is most frequently considered in cases of midface hypoplasia. This may include instances of panfacial hypoplasia but also more focused retrusion or underdevelopment of the nasomaxillary complex, zygomatic arch, or the inferior bony orbits. The goal of Le Fort III osteotomy is to protrude (or otherwise bring forward) the affected area of the midface, thereby improving facial harmony. It may be reserved for more severe midface hypoplasia, where the degree of advancement cannot be achieved through a less invasive Le Fort osteotomy.

Patients presenting with associated features commonly include those with craniofacial deformities. Among these, Apert syndrome, Crouzon syndrome, Binder syndrome, Pfeiffer syndrome, and Treacher Collins syndrome, amongst others, are commonly present. Midface retrusion following facial trauma is also an indication for assessment for this procedure.

Craniofacial deformity patients being assessed for this procedure often have concomitant conditions which can be simultaneously treated by the Le Fort III osteotomy. Obstructive sleep apnea (OSA) is a frequent risk factor in such patients, as the smaller than normal midface reduces airway volume. Le Fort III may thus aid in increasing upper airway volume and alleviate the impact of OSA.

Among craniofacial and trauma patients, hypoplasia at the orbit resulting in ocular proptosis (abnormal protrusion of the eyeball) is an indicator for urgent assessment . The complications of ocular proptosis can, at its most severe, lead to blindness; and, should thus be assessed for correction with orthagnathic surgery.

Psychological distress related to one's appearance is also a known contributor to patient presentation for assessment. In such cases where clinically significant midface hypoplasia is present, assessment for Le Fort III osteotomy is indicated.

== Procedure ==
Much like other Le Fort osteotomies, intensive preparation occurs preoperatively. This may include imaging, facial analysis with or without the use of virtual planning, and the preparation of surgical splints for intraoperative use.

Following arrival in the operating room, patients undergo general anesthesia alongside local anesthesia injected at the surgical site. Multiple incisions are then made depending on the degree of midface mobilization required. These most commonly materialize as bitemporal, transconjuntival, and transoral incisions. The aforementioned incisions allow surgeons to visualize the zygomatic-temporal suture (where the two bones fuse), the lower orbits, the nasion, and the frontal skull. Specialized cutting tools such as osteotomes and sagital saws are then used to separate the midface. The specific site of separation may vary between surgeons, but largely involves separations at the zygoma, nasofrontal junction, transversely across the inferior orbits, and between the vomer-ethmoid complex and the rest of the cranium. Upon completion of osteotomies, a final midface down fracture is accomplished using forceps. Free mobility of the midface is then determined.

The now free midface is then 'distracted' to reposition it in the desired fashion. This may be done exclusively by hand using a variety of techniques or with the assistance of distraction devices. Internal or external distraction devices may also used depending on surgeon preference and desired outcomes. Regardless, the midface is stabilized using surgical plates with associated screws, pins, or wires.

Following fixation of the midface, stepwise closure of the various layers of tissue occurs. Patients commonly remain intubated after surgery to protect the airway for swelling.

== Complications ==
The Le Fort III osteotomy is considered to be among the more complicated and invasive surgeries used to address midface deformity. This surgical approach has been honed in the decades since its introduction and is a reliable tool within orthagnathic surgery. Nonetheless, the surgery carries risk for a range of complications which varies across the literature. Standard operative complications such as bleeding, infection, and damage to surrounding structures are true in the case of the Le Fort III osteotomy.

Bleeding can occur intra-operatively due to direct damage to blood vessels or postoperatively, contributing to bruising and swelling. Swelling may cause discomfort, limit ability to secrete excretions, and further compromise the airway; therefore, many patients remain intubated following surgery until their swelling is reduced. Damage to intracranial structures may also occur. Such anatomic injury may involve arteries and nerves may also occur due to intraoperative manipulation or be limited to extensive fracturing of the facial bones beyond the surgeon's intent. Iatrogenic nerve damage has been described as an injury, with reports of damage to the facial nerve, olfactory nerve, and optic nerve reported amongst others. Nerve injury may be temporary or longer lasting. Infection and wound breakdown may also occur.

Patients are typically closely monitored in the intensive care unit following surgery in order to minimize the risk for complications, particularly while they remain intubated.

== See also ==
- Le Fort osteotomy
- Le Fort I osteotomy
- Maxillomandibular advancement
- Le Fort fracture of skull
