= Hugo Obwegeser =

Australian surgeon (1920 - 2017)

- Born: 21 October 1920
- Died: 2 September 2017 (aged 96)
- Education: University of Vienna
- Known for: Modern father of Orthognathic Surgery, First person to describe the bimaxillary surgery involving maxilla and mandible
- Medical career
- Profession: Oral and Maxillo-Facial Surgeon
- Sub-specialties: Orthognathic Surgery

Hugo Obwegeser (21 October 1920 – 2 September 2017) was an Austrian Oral and Maxillo-Facial Surgeon and Plastic Surgeon who is known as the father of the modern orthognathic surgery. In his publication of 1970, he was the first surgeon to describe the simultaneous procedure which involved surgeries of both Maxilla and Mandible involving Le Fort I and Bilateral Sagittal Split Osteotomy technique.

== Career ==
In 1945, Obwegeser attended the Rockitansky Institute of Pathological Anatomy at University of Vienna after he consulted his uncle who was a physician. He received 1 year of general surgery training, 2 years of pathology training. Then he went to Graz University to train in Oral and Maxillofacial Surgery under Richard Trauner. He trained there for 6 years and performed many surgeries related to war injuries. Hugo then left to train under Harold Gillies, who was known as the founder of modern plastic and reconstructive surgery. He worked with him from 1951 to 1952. Hugo was also influenced by Dr. Paul Tessier whom he learned how to advance the entire middle third of the face. Thus he eventually ended up attaining degrees in Oral and maxillofacial surgery, plastic surgery and general surgery.

== Le Fort I osteotomy ==
Obwegeser developed the modern Le Fort I osteotomy procedure in which he completely mobilized the maxilla. His technique involved the pterygomaxillary disjunction. He was also a proponent of using bone graft between the pterygoid plates and maxillary tuberosities. Obwegeser's surgical technique was confirmed by William Bell's research on animals where the vasculature integrity of maxilla was confirmed. He also published a paper in 1969, where he described the two jaw surgery being performed simultaneously.

In 1966 Obwegeser introduced his orthognathic surgery techniques to North American surgeons at the American Society of Oral Surgery meeting held at Walter Reed Military Hospital, Washington DC.

He also wrote a textbook called Mandibular Growth Anomalies: Terminology-Aetiology Diagnosis - Treatment.

== Positions and awards ==
- Journal of Oral and Maxillofacial Surgery, Editor-in-Chief
- German Society of Oral and Maxillofacial Surgery, Past-President
- European Association of Maxillofacial Surgery, Past-President
- Semmelweis-Medicine University, Medal of Honor
- Down Surgical Prize by British Association of Oral and Maxillofacial Surgeons

== See also ==
- Condylar hyperplasia
