= Le Fort I osteotomy =

The Le Fort I osteotomy is a surgical procedure to realign the upper jaw (maxilla). This procedure is a type of orthognathic surgery that is primarily performed to fix deformities of the face and jaw, improve facial aesthetics, treat malocclusions (misaligned teeth), and treat certain medical conditions, such as obstructive sleep apnea. The surgery involves separating the maxilla from the rest of the skull and then repositioning it.

== History ==
The Le Fort I osteotomy is named after René Le Fort's 1901 description of midface fracture patterns resulting from trauma, is a surgical procedure used to correct dentofacial deformities and, in some cases, facilitate tumor removal or complex fracture reduction. The procedure involves a horizontal osteotomy of the maxilla, separating it from the skull base at the level of the Le Fort I fracture line. Unlike the fracture, the osteotomy preserves the pterygoid plates by cutting at the pterygomaxillary junction. This allowed for controlled movement of the tooth-bearing portion of the maxilla in multiple directions (anteroposteriorly, vertically, rotationally) and permitted segmentation or expansion.

Early maxillary osteotomies, performed in the 1860s, primarily aimed to improve surgical access for nasopharyngeal tumor removal through temporary maxillary mobilization. The application of this technique to correct dentofacial deformities developed later. In the early 1900s, procedures using postoperative traction for maxillary repositioning were described. The 1930s saw further refinement with the introduction of intraoperative mobilization, especially for correcting open bites. Separating the pterygomaxillary junction also became a technique for achieving anterior repositioning.

Subsequent developments in surgical techniques, understanding of revascularization, and the integration of orthodontics and fixation methods have influenced the use of the Le Fort I osteotomy. Collaboration between surgeons and orthodontists, along with techniques such as complete mobilization and bone grafting, have been incorporated into practice. The Le Fort I osteotomy is now used in orthognathic surgery and may be performed in conjunction with mandibular osteotomies in combined jaw procedures such as maxillomandibular advancement.

== Maxillary anatomy ==
The maxilla is a paired bone that forms a significant portion of the midface. It articulates with the frontal, zygomatic, palatine bone, and sphenoid bones. The Le Fort I segment, the portion of the maxilla mobilized during the osteotomy, receives its blood supply primarily from the ascending palatine artery (a branch of the facial artery) and the anterior branch of the ascending pharyngeal artery (from the external carotid artery). The descending palatine arteries, located posterior to the pyramidal process of the palatine bone, are at risk of injury, particularly during the lateral nasal osteotomy. The maxillary nerve (cranial nerve V_{2}) provides sensory innervation to the maxilla. The infraorbital nerve, a terminal branch of the maxillary nerve, innervates midface soft tissues and anterior maxillary teeth and is identified and preserved during the osteotomy.

== Indications ==
The Le Fort I osteotomy is indicated for a variety of conditions related to skeletal discrepancies of the midface. These include maxillomandibular deformities such as maxillary hypoplasia (underdevelopment of the bones of the upper jaw) and mandibular hyperplasia (overdevelopment of the mandible) as well as facial asymmetries.

It is commonly used to correct malocclusion, specifically Angle's Class II (overbite) and Class III (underbite) malocclusions, improving the patient's bite and chewing function. The procedure can also address vertical discrepancies, such as vertical maxillary excess (long face syndrome) or deficiency, which affect facial height and the amount of gingival display when smiling. Certain cases of an open bite malocclusion (apertognathia), a condition where the front teeth do not meet when the jaw is closed, can also be corrected with this procedure.

Le Fort I osteotomy is also used to treat certain cases of obstructive sleep apnea by increasing the volume of the upper airway, thus alleviating breathing difficulties during sleep. In cases of severe maxillary atrophy, often seen in patients who have lost teeth and experienced bone resorption, the osteotomy can be combined with bone grafting to create a suitable foundation for dental implants. The Le Fort I osteotomy can also be used to gain surgical access for the removal of tumors in the midface or skull base or to facilitate the reduction of complex midfacial fractures.

== Procedure ==
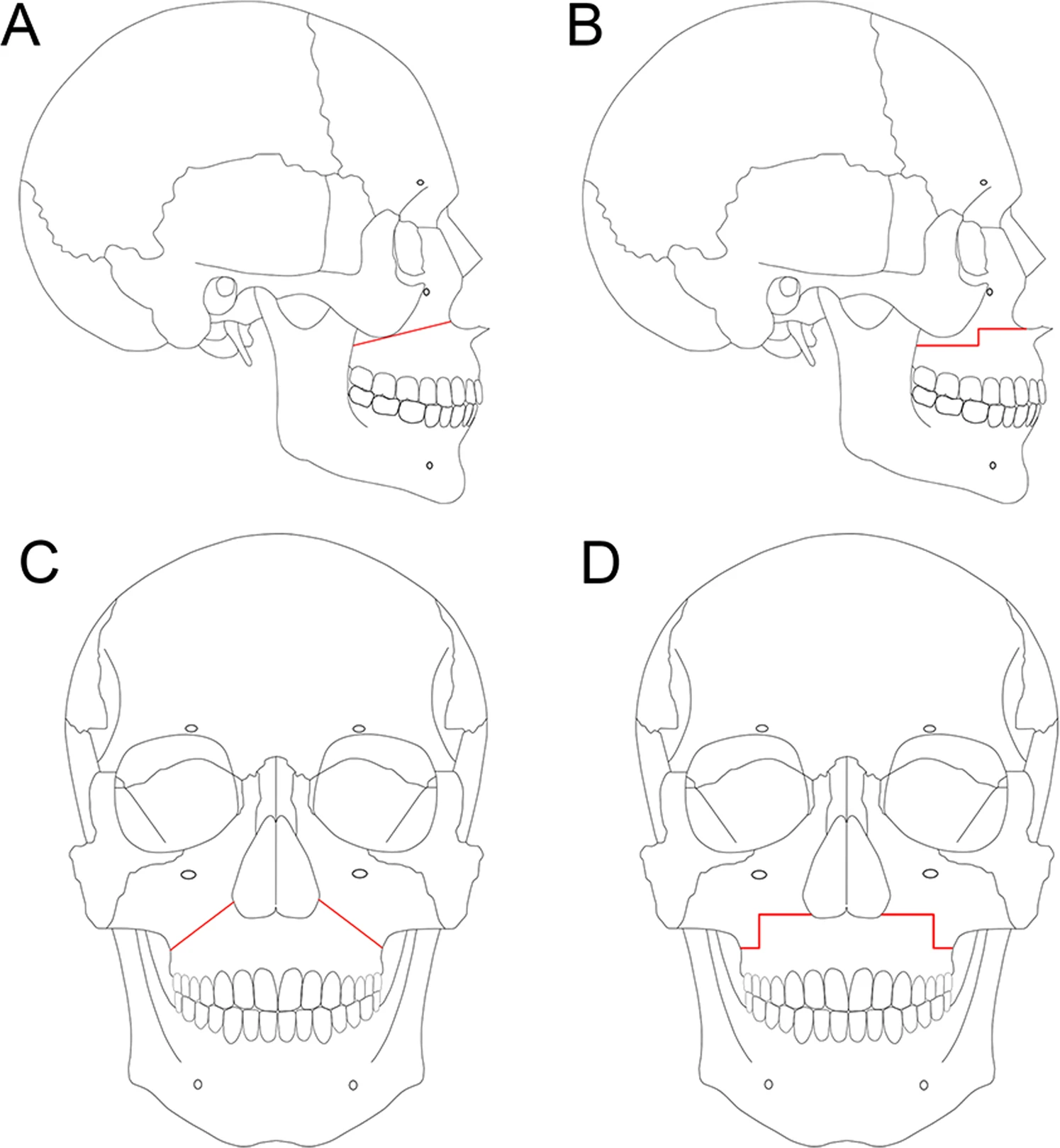
Variations in Le Fort I osteotomy. (A) Lateral view of original Le Fort I osteotomy. (B) Lateral view of maxillary step osteotomy. (C) Frontal view of original Le Fort I osteotomy. (D) Frontal view of maxillary step osteotomy.

Preoperative planning for the Le Fort I osteotomy is performed and typically involves detailed facial analysis, imaging, and often the creation of surgical splints. Orthodontic treatment may be necessary before and after surgery to optimize dental alignment.

The surgery begins by placing the patient under general anesthesia, injecting a local anesthetic containing epinephrine into the planned incision line, and then placing a throat pack. An incision in the maxillary vestibule (the area between the upper lip and gum), extending from the first molar on one side to the first molar on the other, is made. The soft tissues are carefully dissected to expose the maxilla. Key anatomical structures, such as the infraorbital nerves, are identified and protected.

The osteotomy itself is performed using a combination of specialized instruments, including saws, burs, and osteotomes. The horizontal cut is made above the roots of the teeth, extending from the lateral maxillary buttress (the bony prominence on the side of the maxilla) to the piriform rims (near the opening of the nasal cavity). Additional cuts are made to separate the maxilla from the nasal septum and the pterygomaxillary junction. These cuts allow the maxilla to be mobilized as a single unit.

Once the osteotomy is complete, the maxilla is gently separated by down-fracturing using finger pressure and repositioned according to the preoperative plan. This repositioning can involve moving the maxilla forward (advancement), backward (retraction), upward (impaction), downward (down-grafting), or rotating it. In some cases, the maxilla may be segmented and/or expanded transversely to allow for more complex movements.

After repositioning, the maxilla is stabilized using plates and screws. These fixation devices hold the bone segments in their new position, allowing for healing. Surgical splints, fabricated preoperatively, are used to guide the correct positioning of the jaws and ensure proper occlusion (bite). The surgical site is then irrigated, and the soft tissues are closed with sutures. In some cases, additional procedures, such as a nasal or alar cinch suture (to prevent widening of the nostrils) or a V-to-Y closure (to prevent lip shortening), may be performed. Postoperatively, maxillomandibular fixation (wiring the jaws together) may be used for a period to aid in healing.

== Complications ==
The Le Fort I osteotomy, while generally considered a technically straightforward surgery, carries a risk of complications, albeit infrequent. Reported complication rates from various studies range between 6.7% and 8.77%. These complications can be broadly classified into several categories: anatomical, septic, ischemic, vascular, neurologic, and otologic.

Anatomical complications include nasal septum deviation (a shift in the nasal septum), nonunion (failure of the bone to heal properly), and malposition of the maxilla. Vascular complications primarily involve hemorrhage (bleeding). Ischemic complications, such as avascular necrosis (bone death due to lack of blood supply), can also occur and are more likely with large advancements or segmental osteotomies. Neurologic complications can include nerve damage leading to sensory deficits in the midface, although these are usually temporary. Rare but more serious neurological complications such as unilateral blindness and oculomotor nerve palsy have been reported. Otologic complications, such as middle ear problems, are also possible but are not common. Infections, such as abscesses and maxillary sinusitis, can also occur.

== See also ==
- Maxillomandibular advancement
- Le Fort osteotomy
- Le Fort III osteotomy
