= Regional Acceleratory Phenomenon =

Physiological phenomenon with medical implications

Regional acceleratory phenomenon (RAP) is a sudden acceleration of normal tissue processes in reaction to noxious stimuli. It has been exploited in treatments such as the healing of atrophic or oligotrophic nonunions and surgically facilitated orthodontic therapy.

== Background ==
In the early 1980s, American orthopedist Harold Frost published a review article detailing then known experiences with regional acceleratory phenomena, which can be caused by injuries such as fractures and burns, afflictions such as acute paralysis and arthritis, bone movement such as implant placement and orthodontics, as well as vitamin D, thyroxine, and electrical stimuli. Once evoked, processes such as perfusion, the growth of skin, bone and other connective tissues, as well as their healing, turnover and remodeling can all accelerate beyond normal values. More overt manifestations include warmness of an affected region, decreased bone density, and increased bone plasticity. In rat tibia, more intense RAP was observed with deeper corticotomy. RAP typically lasts four months but, in cases of branchial plexus injuries or severe burns, potentially over two years and predisposing the patient to hypercalciuria and genitourinary tract lithiasis. If the causative stimuli were not removed, RAP may even persist indefinitely.

== Effects ==
The effects of regional acceleratory phenomenon can be positive or negative. A study in rabbits suggested that, following osteotomy, RAP contributed to a fivefold increase in new bone without a change in bone volume. In tibial fractures, accelerated bone turnover allows the union of interfaces to occur typically within six months, compared to about twenty years for remodeling based on basic multicellular units (BMUs) alone. On the other hand, increased collagen production due to RAP in rheumatoid arthritis or osteoid osteoma may lead to diffuse fibrosis and joint stiffening.

=== Impaired RAP ===
Obtunded or absent RAP often accompanies sensory denervation. In neuropathic soft tissue lesions, such as those in diabetics and certain frostbites, such impairment results in prolonged healing. Similarly, against insults, Charcot joints display far less tissue responses such as edema, erythema, fibrosis, and bone production. In late stage or some variants of rheumatoid arthritis, RAP may also be diminished; joints and ligaments become lax, allowing microscopic damages to accumulate leading to tendon rupture.

== Implications in research ==
Due to regional acceleratory phenomenon, repeated biopsies of the same bone may perturb the data being gathered. Transient RAP may also mask the depressive effects of mechanical deloading on bone growth. Experimental procedures may evoke RAP alongside other mechanical forces, such as when implanting hardware in a bone to measure the change in its diameter and porosity under mechanical compression, or when mechanically deloading bone by plate fixation, thereby yielding mixed results.

== Clinical uses ==
=== In dentistry ===
A 1994 study in rats found that the elevation of a mucoperiosteal flap is sufficient to induce RAP in the mandible. In 2001, the Wilcko brothers reported that in two patients, accelerated tooth movement for orthodontics were achieved following partial decortication of the cortical plates and concomitant bone grafting; increased bone thickness and the covering of a previous bony fenestration were also observed. Using similar techniques, the brothers went on to introduce periodontally accelerated osteogenic orthodontics (PAOO). Corticision, a less invasive technique, introduces injury without the need for a flap reflection while still accelerating tooth movement. Other recent innovations include the use of piezosurgery, micro-osteoperforation, vibrating devices, ultrasound, laser, or drugs to induce RAP.
