= Le Fort I =

Le Fort I may refer to:

- Le Fort fracture of skull, type I
- Le Fort I osteotomy
