= Rib remodeling =

Waist-contouring surgical technique

Rib remodeling is a body contouring surgical technique that narrows the waistline by reshaping the lower false and floating ribs through controlled, ultrasound-guided monocortical fractures, without removing bone and without external skin incisions. It was developed by Peruvian plastic surgeon Raúl Manzaneda Cipriani and is commercially known as RibXcar. Procedural variants and a reconstructive application have subsequently been described in the peer-reviewed literature.

== History and development ==
The foundational description was published in December 2023 in Plastic and Reconstructive Surgery – Global Open. The initial study applied the technique to 30 women in Peru, Colombia and Mexico, measuring the costal angle and waist circumference by ultrasound before surgery, immediately afterwards, and at one and three months. The article received the journal's 2024 award.

In 2024, Manzaneda described the instrument used in the procedure — an ultrasonic piezotome adapted in three steps (tip redesign, coating and sterilization) for rib surgery without incisions — published under the name "Manzaneda's Tool". The instrument is manufactured by Manzaneda's team and distributed by Marina Medical.

Subsequent publications described procedural variants, including waist reduction through conversion of false ribs to floating ribs (2024), waist reduction by rib incurvation (2026), and the "Dots Point" technique, which presents the controlled fracture pattern as a safety principle (2026). A 2026 prospective cohort study extended the technique beyond aesthetic contouring to reconstructive use in posterolateral thoracic deformities.

== Technique ==
The procedure reshapes the lower ribs through controlled, ultrasound-guided monocortical fractures performed via small punctures rather than open incisions, using the adapted piezotome. Reducing the diameter of the lower costal arch decreases the waist circumference while preserving the integrity of the bone; unlike rib resection procedures, the ribs are repositioned rather than removed. Intraoperative control combines ultrasound imaging with the audible feedback of the monocortical fracture, a method examined in a 2024 article.

== Safety and evidence ==
In a 2025 survey of 113 surgeons using the technique, 2.65% of respondents reported having had a serious complication (pneumothorax or hemothorax). A 2026 prospective cohort of 328 patients with one-year follow-up reported bicortical fractures in 15 patients (4.6%), mostly within the first 20 days after surgery, correlated with higher visceral fat and longer operative time. A 2026 study assessed respiratory function after the procedure.

A 2026 systematic review and meta-analysis published in Aesthetic Plastic Surgery, based on searches of PubMed, Cochrane and Embase, examined the efficacy and safety of rib remodeling without rib resection.

== Scientific discussion ==
Approaches to rib remodeling have been discussed in the peer-reviewed literature. A 2025 article by Alfredo Hoyos and colleagues described a related puncture-based approach, to which Manzaneda published a formal response.

== Related techniques ==
Manzaneda has described a series of ultrasound-guided body-contouring techniques in the peer-reviewed literature, including iliac crest reduction (XCREST), ultrasound-guided rectus abdominis fat transfer, and direct-vision liposuction. Rib remodeling is the most widely reported of these.

== Reception ==
The technique has been covered by consumer and industry media as part of wider interest in waist-contouring procedures, and is taught to plastic surgeons internationally.
