= Hemifacial microsomia =

Birth defect which affects the lower half of the face

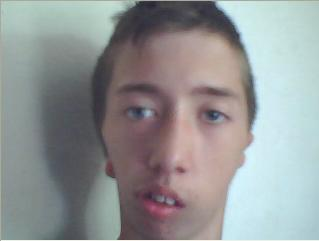
- Bilateral (both sides) hemifacial microsomia in an adolescent
- Specialty: Craniofacial surgery, pediatrics

Hemifacial microsomia (HFM) is a congenital disorder that affects the development of the lower half of the face, most commonly the ears, the mouth and the mandible. It usually occurs on one side of the face, but both sides are sometimes affected. If severe, it may result in difficulties in breathing due to obstruction of the trachea—sometimes even requiring a tracheotomy. With an incidence in the range of 1:3500 to 1:4500, it is the second most common birth defect of the face, after cleft lip and cleft palate. HFM shares many similarities with Treacher Collins syndrome.

== Presentation ==
The clinical presentation of HFM is quite variable. The severity may depend on the extent of the area with an insufficient blood supply in utero, and the gestational age of the fetus at which this occurs. In some people, the only physical manifestation may be a small and underdeveloped external ear. In more severe cases, multiple parts of the face may be affected. Some people with HFM may have sensorineural hearing loss and decreased visual acuity or even blindness.

It can be thought of as a particularly severe form of HFM, in which extracranial anomalies are present to some extent. Some of the internal organs (especially the heart, kidneys, and lungs) may be underdeveloped, or in some cases even absent altogether. The affected organs are typically on the same side as the affected facial features, but bilateral involvement occurs in approximately 10% of cases. Deformities of the vertebral column such as scoliosis may also be observed. While there is no universally accepted grading scale, the OMENS scale (standing for Orbital, Mandible, Ear, Nerves and Soft tissue) was developed to help describe the heterogeneous phenotype that makes up this sequence or syndrome.

Intellectual disability is not typically seen in people with HFM. Hemifacial microsomia sometimes results in temporomandibular joint disorders.

== Cause ==
The condition develops in the fetus at approximately 4 weeks' gestational age, when some form of vascular problem such as blood clotting leads to insufficient blood supply to the face. This can be caused by physical trauma, though there is some evidence of it being hereditary. This restricts the developmental ability of that area of the face. Currently there are no definitive reasons for the development of the condition.

== Diagnosis ==
=== Classification ===
Figueroa and Pruzanksky classified HFM patients into three different types:

- Type I : Mild hypoplasia of the ramus, and the body of the mandible is slightly affected.
- Type II : The condyle and ramus are small, the head of the condyle is flattened, the glenoid fossa is absent, the condyle is hinged on a flat, often convex, infratemporal surface, the coronoid may be absent.
- Type III: The ramus is reduced to a thin lamina of bone or is completely absent. There is no evidence of a TMJ.

== Treatment ==
Depending upon the treatment required, it is sometimes most appropriate to wait until later in life for a surgical remedy – the childhood growth of the face may highlight or increase the symptoms. When surgery is required, particularly when there is a severe disfiguration of the jaw, it is common to use a rib graft to help correct the shape.

According to literature, HFM patients can be treated with various treatment options such as functional therapy with an appliance, distraction osteogenesis, or costochondral graft. The treatment is based on the type of severity for these patients. According to Pruzanksky's classification, if the patient has moderate to severe symptoms, then surgery is preferred. If patient has mild symptoms, then a functional appliance is generally used.

According to Dr. Harry Pepe, a pediatrician from Hollywood, Florida, the goal of treatment in hemifacial microsomia is to elongate the deficient jaw bone to restore facial symmetry and correct the slanting bite (occlusion).

Patients can also benefit from a Bone Anchored Hearing Aid (BAHA).

== Terminology ==
The condition is also known by various other names:

- Lateral facial dysplasia
- First and second branchial arch syndrome
- Oral-mandibular-auricular syndrome
- Otomandibular dysostosis
- Craniofacial microsomia

== See also ==
- Condylar hypoplasia
- Goldenhar syndrome
- Parry–Romberg syndrome
