= Jaw abnormality =

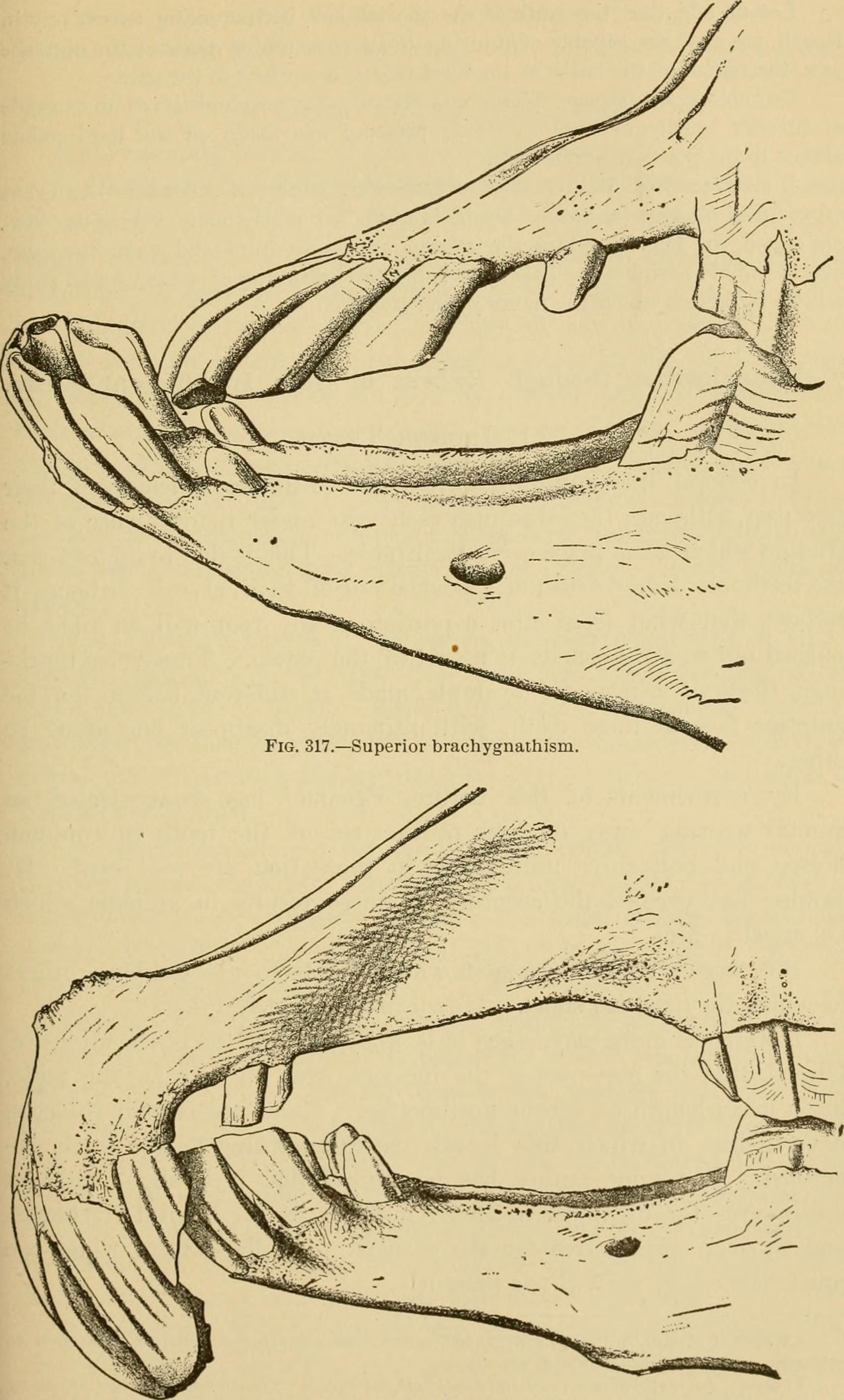
- Specialty: Oral & Maxillofacial surgery

A jaw abnormality is a disorder in the formation, shape and/or size of the jaw. In general abnormalities arise within the jaw when there is a disturbance or fault in the fusion of the mandibular processes. The mandible in particular has the most differential typical growth anomalies than any other bone in the human skeleton. This is due to variants in the complex symmetrical growth pattern which formulates the mandible.

The mandible in particular plays a significant role in appearance as it is the only moving part of the facial skeleton. This has a large impact upon an individual's ability to speak, masticate and also influence their overall aesthetic and expressive features of the face. In turn the maxilla faces the same issues if any abnormalities in size or position were to occur. The obvious functional disabilities that arise from jaw abnormalities are very much physically seen as previously stated, but when considering these individuals it must be kept in mind that these conditions may well affect them psychologically; making them feel as though they are handicapped. It is also of the utmost importance when correcting these mandibular anomalies that the teeth result in a good occlusion with the opposing dentition of the maxilla. If this is not done satisfactorily occlusal instability may be created leading to a plethora of other issues. In order to correct mandibular anomalies it is common for a complex treatment plan which would involve surgical intervention and orthodontic input.

== Signs and symptoms ==
Individuals with jaw abnormalities have both functional and aesthetic impairment.

Misalignment of teeth creates difficulties in head and neck functions related to chewing, swallowing, breathing, speech articulation and lip closure/posture.

Affected individuals may also experience TMJ pain and dysfunction, which negatively affect the quality of life.

A proportion of affected individuals also have psychological problems.

== Diagnosis ==
Diagnosis of a jaw deformity is a structured process, linking the undertaking of a history, physical examination of the patient, and appraisal of diagnostic studies. This process may involve more than a single discipline of Dentistry – in addition to orthodontic and surgical needs, some patients may also require periodontal, endodontic, complex restorative, and prosthetic considerations.

It involves the chief presenting complaint of the patient, which allows the clinician to understand the patient's perception of the problem – what they think the problem is and what they would like corrected. The patient may find eating difficult or may have problems with speech or the appearance of the teeth or face. However, patients may be hesitant to discuss dissatisfaction with their appearance because they may feel that it is more acceptable to present a functional problem to the clinician. For this reason it is important to reassure patients that their aesthetic problems and the effects of these are perfectly valid concerns. In children, psychological development can be affected due to teasing if they have abnormal appearance of teeth or face. Correction of the abnormality can be extremely beneficial to the patient. The benefits can manifest themselves in many ways including improved peer relationships and social confidence. Motivation on the patient's part is necessary if they are going to undergo lengthy orthodontic treatment and major surgery. In addition, they need to be well informed so that they may give valid consent. In terms of history, the family history and perhaps obstetric history may be relevant, especially when features of a syndrome are present.

A medical and dental history is obtained for completeness. The medical history includes questions on the general health of the patient, to assess contraindications to treatment of jaw abnormality. Special emphasis is placed on diseases and medication which cause altered metabolism, that may affect growth and tissue reactions. Allergies are checked (specifically nickel allergies), so that treatment appliances with nickel-containing materials like stainless steel can be replaced with other materials to avoid the risk of allergic reactions. Questions on family history are also relevant, as malocclusions, growth and development may be expressions of genetic patterns. The dental history investigates if the patient has had any previous dental trauma, or past dental experiences, which can serve as a gauge to patient compliance with treatment.

=== Examination ===
The assessment of facial form includes the evaluation of facial soft tissue and dentition. As the human skeleton is not visibly perceptible, bone deformity is inferred and evaluated by facial appearance and dentition. To obtain a 3D assessment of the patient, the skeletal pattern must be measured in different planes: anterior-posterior, vertical, and transverse. This allows for an accurate assessment of the size, position, orientation, shape, and symmetry of the jaws.

The anterior-posterior skeletal pattern measures the relationship of the lower jaw to the upper jaw. This is judged with the patient seated upright, head in a neutral horizontal position, and teeth in gentle occlusion. It can be classified into the following classes:

- Class I: The ideal relationship whereby the upper jaw lies 2-4mm in front of the lower jaw
- Class II: Upper jaw lies more than 4mm in front of the lower jaw
- Class III: Upper jaw lies less than 2mm in front of the lower jaw, or in more severe cases, the lower jaw may be in front of the upper jaw.

The vertical dimension can be measured by facial thirds, with ideal facial aesthetics showing equality between each vertical third. The face is divided into thirds – hairline to glabella; glabella to subnasale; and subnasale to the lowest part of the chin. Two other clinical indicators can be assessed when analysing vertical dimensions, namely the Frankfort Mandibular Planes Angle (FMPA) and the Lower Facial Height (LFH) – both of which are each recorded as either average, increased, or decreased.

- FMPA: This is estimated by the point of intersection between the lower border of the mandible and the Frankfort Horizontal plane.
- LFH: The face is divided into thirds, and the proportion of the lower third of the face is compared to the rest.

The transverse relationship is a measure of jaw or facial asymmetry. It checks for the alignment of the soft tissue nasion, the middle part of the upper lip at the vermillion border, and the chin point. If present, it is necessary to distinguish between a false and true asymmetry. A false asymmetry arises due to occlusal interferences, which results in a lateral displacement of the mandible, producing a cross-bite in the anterior/buccal region. Elimination of the displacement will return the mandible to a centric position. On the other hand, a true asymmetry indicates unequal facial growth on the left or right side of the jaws. Elimination of any occlusal cross-bites is not only difficult, but unlikely to improve the facial asymmetry. The assessment of the transverse components of the facial width is best described by the "rule of fifths", which sagittally divides the face into five equal parts:

- Each transverse fifth should be an eye distance in width.
- The middle fifth is marked by the inner canthus of both eyes.
- The medial three-fifths of the face is marked from the outer canthus of the eye frames
- The outer two-fifths of the face is measured from the lateral canthus to lateral helix of the ear, which represents the width of the ears.

=== Tests ===
It is insufficient to derive at a diagnosis of jaw deformity solely based on the clinical examination. Hence, additional information is gathered from diagnostic tests, which may include dental model analyses and radiographic imaging studies.

1. Dental Model Analyses - Study models for analysis can be made by taking dental impressions, or by 3D intra-oral scanning. They allow for the appraisal of shape and size of jaws and teeth. This can be valuable for the long-term evaluation of development and for the follow-up of treatment results. Depending on the type of jaw abnormality, a face bow record for transfer on to the articulator, can sometimes be appropriate for the patient.
2. Radiographs - Radiographic investigations should be based on individual needs and used in conjunction to the clinical examination. As with all other dental radiographs, the benefit gained for the patient with the radiograph must be weighed against the radiation dosage of taking it. In the assessment of jaw abnormalities, the most common radiographs taken used to be the dental panoramic tomography and lateral cephalometry. With the advancement in technology, the use of 3D imaging e.g. Cone Beam Computed Tomography (CBCT) has gained popularity for the use of radiographic examinations of facial bones for purpose of planning complex orthognathic surgery, especially involving significant facial asymmetry. A 3D facial construction model can be utilised in more complex malocclusion to help plan management.

== Classification ==
=== Size ===
- Micrognathia

Mandibular micrognathia is the condition when lower jaw is smaller than normal. Failure of the ramus to develop will give rise to micrognathia. Micrognathia can be classified as either congenital or acquired. Clinical appearance of some patients with congenital type of mandibular micrognathia can have a severe retrusion of the chin but by actual measurements, the mandible may be found to be within the normal limits of variation. This may be because a posterior placing of the condylar head with regard to the skull or to a steep mandibular angle resulting in an evident jaw retrusion. The acquired type of micrognathia occurs after birth and usually is an effect of a disturbance to temporomandibular joint. Growth of mandible depends on the normally developing condyles and the muscle function For example, trauma or infection that affect mastoid, middle ear or the joint will result in ankylosis of temporomandibular joint leading to mandibular micrognathia.

- Macronagthia

Macronagthia is a condition of abnormally large jaws. The jaw size is usually proportion to the increase in skeleton size. It is usually due to excessive growth of the mandible and can have features including reverse maxillary to mandibular relationship, reverse overjet or absence of overbite. It can also be clinically presented when the glenoid fossa and condylar head is more anteriorly placed, causing mandibular prognathism. Macronagthism can be associated with other medical conditions :-

1. Paget's disease where there is overgrowth of the maxilla, cranium and mandible

2. Acromegaly, an endocrine disease, can present with enlargement of bones with growth potential such as the mandible, thickened soft tissues and facial features and spade-like hands

- Macrogenia or Microgenia

Macrogenia and microgenia occur when there is a normal skeletal relationship but the chin, skeletal and soft tissue components, failed to develop in proportion to the skeletal base, resulting in marked protrusive (macrogenia) or retrusive (microgenia) facial profile. Microgenia can be presented when there is inadequate bone depth at the apex of lower anteriors or the base of mandible and vice versa.

=== Position ===
- Transverse

A transverse jaw position is known as Laterognathia. This term describes a lateral bite in the lower jaw and is often associated with a unilateral crossbite at an early age This can lead to bone development of an asymmetrical mandibular ramus resulting in asymmetry in the whole of the lower face. Treatment of laterognathism is either possible with orthodontic tooth movement or a surgical relocation of the lower jaw.

- Vertical

One of the ways in which a jaw can develop abnormally is in the vertical dimension. Abnormal growth can occur in the maxilla and the mandible. The jaw is usually loosely used to refer to the mandible (considered the lower jaw). However, the maxilla is also a jaw and should thus be referred to in this respect as well.

The vertical jaw abnormalities relating to the mandible are in relation to excessive vertical growth and excessive horizontal growth, measured by the maxillary-mandibular plane angle (MMPA). The vertical jaw abnormalities relating to the maxilla are in relation to excessive downward displacement (EDD) and insufficient downward displacement (IDD). These terms used to previously be known as vertical maxillary excess and deficiency. This nomenclature changed because excess and deficiency typically refer to size. Whereas when assessing this clinically, one would measure the distance between the central incisors and the upper lip, which, in fact, denotes position rather than size. Therefore, in order to ‘harmonize with geometry’, EDD and IDD are now used widely.

Vertical and Horizontal Mandibular Excess:

Simply put, excessive vertical growth is the term used for when the mandible is considered ‘too far down. Whereas in excessive horizontal growth the opposite applies, where the mandible is growing in a more horizontal pattern, in relation to the maxilla. The primary cause of the above two abnormalities in adolescents is due to accelerated and slow mandibular growth. Resulting in either a longer lower face height appearance (vertical growth) or a shorter one (horizontal growth). The length between the columella (base of the nose) and menton (base of the chin) is the variable measurement. This is in relation to the length between the glabella (between eyebrows) and the columella. In a normal case, these lengths would be equal or without a major discrepancy. However, in excess vertical and horizontal growth, the proportions vary and do not equal.

The development of the mandible is such that it ossifies in two primary ways; endochondrally and intramembranously. Almost the entire mandible is formed via intramembranous ossification, with just the condyle ossifying endochondrally. This allows the condyle to resist forces exerted on it. One way in which a vertical jaw abnormality can occur is if the condylar growth process is damaged, and thus the intramembranous growth continues along the posterior condylar margin, becoming predominant, thus resulting in a high angle type.

Assessing a patient for vertical and horizontal excess

The Maxillary Mandibular Plane Angle (MMPA) is important in assessing a patient for vertical jaw abnormality. The important landmarks are the Frankfurt plane and the Mandibular plane. The Frankfurt plane is a line charted from the upper border of external auditory meatus to the lower border of the orbit. It is similar to the ala-tragus line however should not be confused with it. Whereas the Mandibular angle is a line measured along the natural lower border of the patient's mandible. The intersection of the Frankfurt and Mandibular plane is what determines the pattern of vertical growth. If the intersection occurs behind the occiput i.e. decreased angle, then the patient is considered to have horizontal growth. On the other hand, if the intersection occurs in front of the occiput, then the patient is considered to have vertical growth. The normal range is considered to be between 25 and 30 degrees in a typical Caucasian person. Those with excess vertical jaw growth are most often seen having an anterior open bite, as the mandible is growing away from the maxilla. Whereas those with excessive horizontal growth are seen as having an overbite.

Excessive Downward Displacement and Insufficient Downward Displacement

Here on, we will use interchangeably the terms vertical maxillary excess and deficiency with excessive and insufficient downward displacement. In order to understand its manifestations, we need to account for key landmarks such as:

· Columella (CM)– The tissue that links the nasal tip to the nasal base, separating the nares. The inferior margin of the nasal septum

· Subnasale (SN) – the junction of the upper lip and the columella

· Stomion Superios (Sts) – the lower most point on the vermillion of the upper lip

· Stomion (Sto) – The point of contact, when lips are competent, in the midline, between the top and bottom lip

· Stomion Inferious (Sti) – the upper most point on the vermillion of the lower lip

· Soft tissue mention (Me) – The most inferior point on the soft tissue outline of the chin

The measurements of the upper lip and lower lip for each patient are ascertained by using the aforementioned landmarks. The length of the upper lip is measured from Sn to Sts. In a typical male and female this measures to 24mm and 21mm respectively (REF). The length of the lower lip is measured from Sti to Me. In a typical male and female this measures to 50mm and 46.5mm respectively.

When considering EDD and IDD, the class of the skeletal base is a good adjunct. In other words, EDD and IDD can either appear camouflaged or apparent given the skeletal base and the soft tissue profile accompanying it. For example, the drape of the upper lip can mask the maxillary deficiency to such an extent that it presents as a normal soft tissue profile (REF). Para-nasal hollowing is a key indicator of underlying maxillary deficiency. It is most common in class III patients, but can also present in some class II cases, with bilateral maxillary retrusion.

Assessing a patient for vertical and horizontal excess:

Arguably the main observation to carry out in a patient to assess maxillary excess or deficiency is the upper incisor/gum show when at rest and smiling. In other words, the relationship between the upper lip and upper central incisors when at rest and smiling. Ensure the patient's head posture is correct and the lips are at rest to establish the resting lip line. Similarly, to assess the incisor/gum show on smiling, the patient needs to fully smile to allow the upper lip to rise to its maximum height. The average showing of the incisors when the lips are at rest is 1/3 of its clinical crown height. With maxillary excess, more than 1/3 of the incisors would show. When the patient smiles, maxillary excess would manifest as the entire clinical crown and a portion of the gums showing as well. This is regarded as a ‘gummy smile.’

As alluded to previously, the paranasal region is important to consider when assessing a patient for IDD or EDD. Observing the patient from the side view allows a clearer perspective. A lack of bony support for the soft tissues in this region will subsequently produce the depression, known as paranasal hollowing. This indicates a low level antero-posterior maxillary deficiency. Maxillary deficiency usually manifests as an increased naso-labial angle, although this is not a credible indication due to factors such as a short upper lip and/or proclined incisors.

Another method to predict if a patient has maxillary deficiency is by the ‘scleral show and eyelid shape.’ The lower eyelid normally rests at the inferior border of the iris, without any sclera showing. If there is any sclera showing, then this is a good sign of infraorbital rim deficiency and maxillary antero-posterior deficiency, two manifestations that are usually seen in Class III patients.

=== Orientation ===
When a jaw is abnormally oriented, malrotations occur. These malrotations are classified according to the axis on which the abnormal rotation occurs. When a jaw is malrotated around the transverse facial axis, it is said to have abnormal pitch. When malrotated around the anteroposterior axis, the jaw has an abnormal roll, a condition also known as cant. Finally, when a jaw is malrotated around the vertical axis, it has abnormal yaw. It can occur in maxilla and/or mandible and could result due to abnormal growth of the jaws in itself or as compensatory growth.

=== Shape ===
Shape refers to figure, the geometric characteristic of an object that is not size, position, or orientation ^{5}. A jaw with abnormal shape is said be distorted.

=== Completeness ===
Completeness means the wholeness of the jaw. When failure of tissues to fuse together that are forming early in pregnancy, defect can happen and jaw is incomplete. For example, cleft lip and palate when one of the jaw's embryological processes failed to fuse together or the agenesis of the condylar process of the mandible, which may be seen in hemifacial microsomia. Clinically, cleft palate presents as opening in the palate that can affect the front palate only or extending from the front to the back palate. Cleft lip is presented clinically with opening of the upper lip which can be a small slit on the upper lip or large opening connected to the nose. The cleft can be unilateral on the upper lip or bilaterally. Cleft lip can happen together with cleft palate.

Palatal clefts are one of the most common congenital abnormalities which occur in 1:2500 live births. Embryologically, palate formation takes place in two stages, with the primary palate formed after 6th week followed by secondary palate formation between sixth and eighth weeks. The palate will fuse with the medial nasal process to form the roof of the mouth in order to complete the developmental process. However, if this process is incomplete that is when developmental defect occur. Initially, it is just a common oro-nasal cavity within the embryo with nothing to separate the nose and mouth cavity. This space is occupied with tongue. The primary palate formed when medial nasal prominences fused together to form the intermaxillary segment to demarcate the oral from the nasal components. The formation of secondary palate starts with the growing of tissues vertically and mesially forming the right and left lateral palatal shelves. On the week 8, the tongue will be withdrawn downwards and the right and left lateral palatal shelves will be rapidly elevated, flipped into a horizontal orientation and fuse together from the front to the back two. The right and left lateral palatal shelves contact or fuse with each other at the midline to form the secondary palate two.

A lot of growth factors are actively involved in the signalling to the tissues during craniofacial development. These growth factors function to control the cells proliferation, survival and apoptosis. Some of the growth factors that can be implicated in the facial development resulting in craniofacial defect are BMP, FGF, Shh, Wnt and endothelins. One of the environmental factors that has been identified in mice study to have link to cleft lip is teratogen which can interfere the molecular signalling between the growth factors. However, the exact mechanism is still not clear. Another environmental factors that has been actively involved in studies to prevent cleft lip and palate occurrences is the intake of folic acid during pregnancy. 0.4 mg folic acid intake per day has been shown to reduce one third risk of cleft lip (with or without cleft palate) in babies. However, it seems had no apparent effect on the risk of cleft palate alone. There are also studies in mice and dogs reported the protective effect of folic acid supplementation to prevent cleft lip palate occurrence.

== Treatment ==
Jaw abnormalities are commonly treated with combined surgical (orthognathic surgery) and orthodontic treatment. The procedure is carried out by oral and maxillofacial surgeons and orthodontists in close collaboration.

In most cases, the orthodontist will first align the teeth with braces or other appliances, which may worsen the occlusion until after the surgery. This is carried out to show the full degree of abnormality, and to create sufficient space for full correction in the bones.

Orthognathic surgery, also known as corrective jaw surgery, is performed to normalise dentofacial deformity and reposition part/all of the upper and/or lower jaws to improve occlusion stability and facial proportions. It is the 'mainstay treatment for patients who are too old for growth modification and for dentofacial conditions that are too severe for either surgical or orthodontic camouflage.'

The surgery usually involves gaining access to the bone from inside the mouth, revealing and moving the bone into a correct functional position, and fixing it in position with metal plates and screws. These plates are most often left in the bone, but at times require removal due to infection, which would require another operation. Most orthognathic surgeries are performed inside the mouth without any external scarring.

=== Mandibular surgery ===
There are numerous surgical techniques available to correct the position of the mandible. The most popular of these techniques is the sagittal split osteotomy which "enables the body of mandible to be moved forwards or backwards by sliding the split ramus and angle". This provides a lot of bone overlap for healing. Damage to the inferior alveolar bundle is avoided by sectioning the buccal and retromolar cortex of the mandible and the cancellous bone is carefully split. After the mandible has been repositioned, screws or mini-plates can be used to fix the mandible directly. This is instead of fixing it indirectly with intermaxillary fixation (IMF).

=== Genioplasty ===
Reduction or augmentation of the chin may be carried out either on its own or as part of a mandibular or maxillary orthognathic operation.

=== Maxillary surgery ===
The Le Fort classification (which is used for fracture description) generally describes the surgical techniques which are used for maxillary surgery.
