= Neuroplastic surgery =

- Specialty: Neurology; neurosurgery; plastic surgery

Neuroplastic or neuroplastic and reconstructive surgery is the surgical specialty involved in reconstruction or restoration of patients who undergo surgery of the central or peripheral nervous system. The field includes a wide variety of surgical procedures that seek to restore or replace a patient's skull, face, scalp, dura (the protective covering of the brain and spinal cord), the spine and/or its overlying tissues.

== History of the field ==
Neuroplastic surgery has adapted reconstructive principles from the fields of craniofacial surgery, and plastic and reconstructive surgery and refined them in order to prevent and/or address challenging deformities which result from Neurosurgical Procedures. The evolution of this new specialty and first center for Neuroplastic and Reconstructive Surgery was started at Johns Hopkins University Hospital in Baltimore, Maryland by a formal collaboration between the Department of Plastic and Reconstructive Surgery and Department of Neurosurgery, under the vision of Dr. Chad Gordon. Upon arrival to Johns Hopkins Hospital, Gordon formed a multi-disciplinary team of physicians, scientists and engineers. The team's unified goal was to develop techniques and devices to treat adult neurosurgical patients. These advances led to several "first-in-human" publications and skull implant/craniofacial computer-assisted technology patents, and allowed for the establishment of the first formal fellowship training program in Neuroplastic and Reconstructive Surgery. In March 2018, Dr. Gordon was appointed the Director of Neuroplastic and Reconstructive Surgery at Johns Hopkins. In 2018, the "Society of Neuroplastic Surgery" was officially formed with the mission to "advance the art, science, and technology related to Neuroplastic and Reconstructive Surgery", and at that time, Dr. Gordon was elected to be the society's first President.

The first peer-reviewed journal to recognize neuroplastic and reconstructive surgery as its own field was the Journal of Craniofacial Surgery which dedicated its January 2018 issue to introducing the new field of neuroplastic surgery to its readership. In that issue, the editor-in-chief, Mutaz Habal, published an editorial on neuroplastic surgery where he stated: "Based on the desire to present the fact that neuroplastic surgery is there, we have a dedicated this issue of the Journal of Craniofacial Surgery. This presentation mostly involves surgical procedures that will be termed ‘‘neuroplastic’’ in the years to come."

== Training ==
Training in neuroplastic surgery requires completion of a neuroplastic and reconstructive surgery fellowship which lasts 1–2 years. Such fellowships are available to individuals who have completed a residency in Plastic and Reconstructive Surgery, ENT Surgery, Neurosurgery or Oral and Maxillofacial surgery. As of today, the only formal fellowship training program in neuroplastic and reconstructive surgery is located at the Johns Hopkins School of Medicine and Johns Hopkins Hospital. The fellowship is co-sponsored by both Departments of Plastic Surgery and Neurosurgery. For each of the clinical fellows in the program, there is an expected volume of participating in over 110 neuro-cranial reconstructions per year with Dr. Gordon and his neurosurgery colleagues, as well as a large spectrum of complex scalp reconstruction and craniofacial cases. The first surgeon formally trained in "Neuroplastic and Reconstructive Surgery" was Dr. Gabriel Santiago [2016-18], who completed ENT surgery residency in the US Navy prior to starting the fellowship. The first Neuroplastic Surgery Research Fellow was Dr. Amir Wolff [2017-18], an attending oral-maxillofacial surgeon from Rambam Medical Center in Haifa, Israel.

== Annual Neuroplastic Surgery Symposium ==
The first Annual Neuroplastic and Reconstructive Surgery Symposium was held at Harvard Medical School/Massachusetts General Hospital in September 2015, co-chaired by Dr. Chad Gordon (Johns Hopkins) and Dr. Michael Yaremchuk (Harvard). Its overarching mission was to increase collaboration, awareness and synergy amongst numerous disciplines including craniofacial plastic surgery, adult-based cranial neurosurgery, biomedical engineering, and neurology for improved patient outcomes. Since then, the symposium has grown significantly and rotates annually between Harvard Medical School/Massachusetts General Hospital (Boston, MA) and Johns Hopkins School of Medicine/Johns Hopkins Hospital (Baltimore, MD). Its main emphasis relates to cranioplasty, implants and implantable neurotechnologies.

== Neuroplastic surgery procedures ==
- Cranioplasty (or skull reconstruction)
- Temporal Hollowing Repair
- Removal of Neurofibroma Tumors in Neurofibromatosis
- Complex Scalp Reconstruction
- Craniofacial Approaches to brain tumors
- Removal of skull and craniofacial tumors
- Complex Approaches to the spine and spinal cord
- Complex closures of the back following spine surgery
- Ventricular Shunt Revision
- Repair of Cerebrospinal Fluid (CSF) leaks
- Dural Reconstruction
- Implantation of Functional Neural Devices
