= Trauner =

Trauner (German: habitational name for someone from Traun in Upper Austria) is a surname. Notable people with the surname include:

- Alexandre Trauner (1906–1993), Hungarian-French Jewish set designer
- Dirk Trauner (born 1967), Austrian chemist
- Gary S. Trauner (born 1958), an American businessman in Wyoming
- Gernot Trauner (born 1992), Austrian football player
- Marc Trauner (born 1969), German entertainer
- Richard Trauner (1900–1980), Austrian oral surgeon
