= Craniofacial Fellowship =

In the United States, a craniofacial surgery fellowship is a one-year program that prepares plastic surgeons to perform cosmetic, dental, and craniofacial surgery as well as the clinical application used in relevant medical procedures. The fellowship allows plastic surgeons to learn how to reconstruct and reshape the faces and heads of infants and children with facial anomalies, as well as those with traumatic injuries or cancer.

== Eligibility ==
To be eligible for craniofacial surgery fellowship, the candidate must have graduated from an accredited craniofacial surgery residency program (as defined in the American Society of Craniofacial Surgeons standards) and be in possession of a letter of recommendation from a person who has experienced a craniofacial surgery procedure with the surgeon. If the applicant is from another country, they should have completed the ECFMG examination or the USMLE and should be qualified for clinical activities.

== Notable Craniofacial Fellows ==
- Andrew Heggie
