= Surgically facilitated orthodontic therapy =

Surgically facilitated orthodontic therapy (SFOT) is a group of orthodontic procedures; they can be broadly divided into two main categories.

== Types ==
The less invasive type uses alveolar corticotomies and is aimed at augmenting the alveolar bone deficiencies and shortening the orthodontic treatment time. Such procedures may also be referred to as accelerated osteogenic orthodontics (AOO), periodontally accelerated osteogenic orthodontics (PAOO), corticotomy-assisted orthodontic treatment (CAOT), selective alveolar decortication (SAD), or corticotomy-facilitated orthodontics (CFO) a.k.a. speedy orthodontics. Various techniques have been introduced, but they mainly involve creating corticotomies in the alveolar bone, creating a Regional Acceleratory Phenomenon (RAP) that leads to increased bone turnover, decreased mineral content of the alveolar bone, and thus faster tooth movement and bone remodeling. These techniques also underlie PAOO, where simultaneous bone augmentation with particulate bone graft (allgraft/xenograft) and collagen membrane were added in order to correct a deficient alveolar bone (dehiscences and fenestrations) that is often associated with gingival recessions. Various flap design modifications have been suggested, including the full-thickness mucoperiosteal flap reflection or the VISTA approach. In certain circumstances, modifications to the procedure using piezosurgical devices or without any flap elevation have been attempted.

The second category uses the principles of osteodistraction and osteotomies to facilitate correction of often severe malocclusions, such as rapid maxillary expansion to correct a narrow maxilla or closure of large clefts in cleft palate patients.
