= Corticotomy =

Medical procedure in bone surgery

In bone surgery, a corticotomy is a cutting of the bone that may or may not split into two pieces (bone fracture). It involves only the cortex, leaving intact the medullary vessels and periosteum. Corticotomy is particularly important in distraction osteogenesis or surgically facilitated orthodontic therapy.
