= Andrew Heggie =

Australian oral and maxillofacial surgeon

Andrew A.C Heggie
- Education: Melbourne University
- Occupations: Oral and Maxillofacial Surgeon
- Known for: Surgical techniques for managing facial deformity
- Medical career
- Institutions: Royal Children's Hospital Melbourne, Melbourne Oral & Maxillofacial Surgery
- Awards: Member of the Order of Australia 2019

Andrew A.C. Heggie is an oral and maxillofacial surgeon at the Royal Children's Hospital in Melbourne, Australia. His primary interest has been the management of developmental skeletal facial deformity, including patients with cleft lip and palate, craniofacial microsomia and infants with micrognathism. His contribution to the treatment of infant upper airway obstruction for Pierre Robin sequence, using internal devices for jaw lengthening using distraction osteogenesis, has replaced the need for tracheostomy in this condition. In 2019, Heggie was awarded Member of the Order of Australia for significant service to medicine and dentistry in the field of oral and maxillofacial surgery.
