= Le Fort III =

Le Fort III may refer to:

- Le Fort fracture of skull, type III
- Le Fort III osteotomy
