= Léon Clément Le Fort =

French surgeon

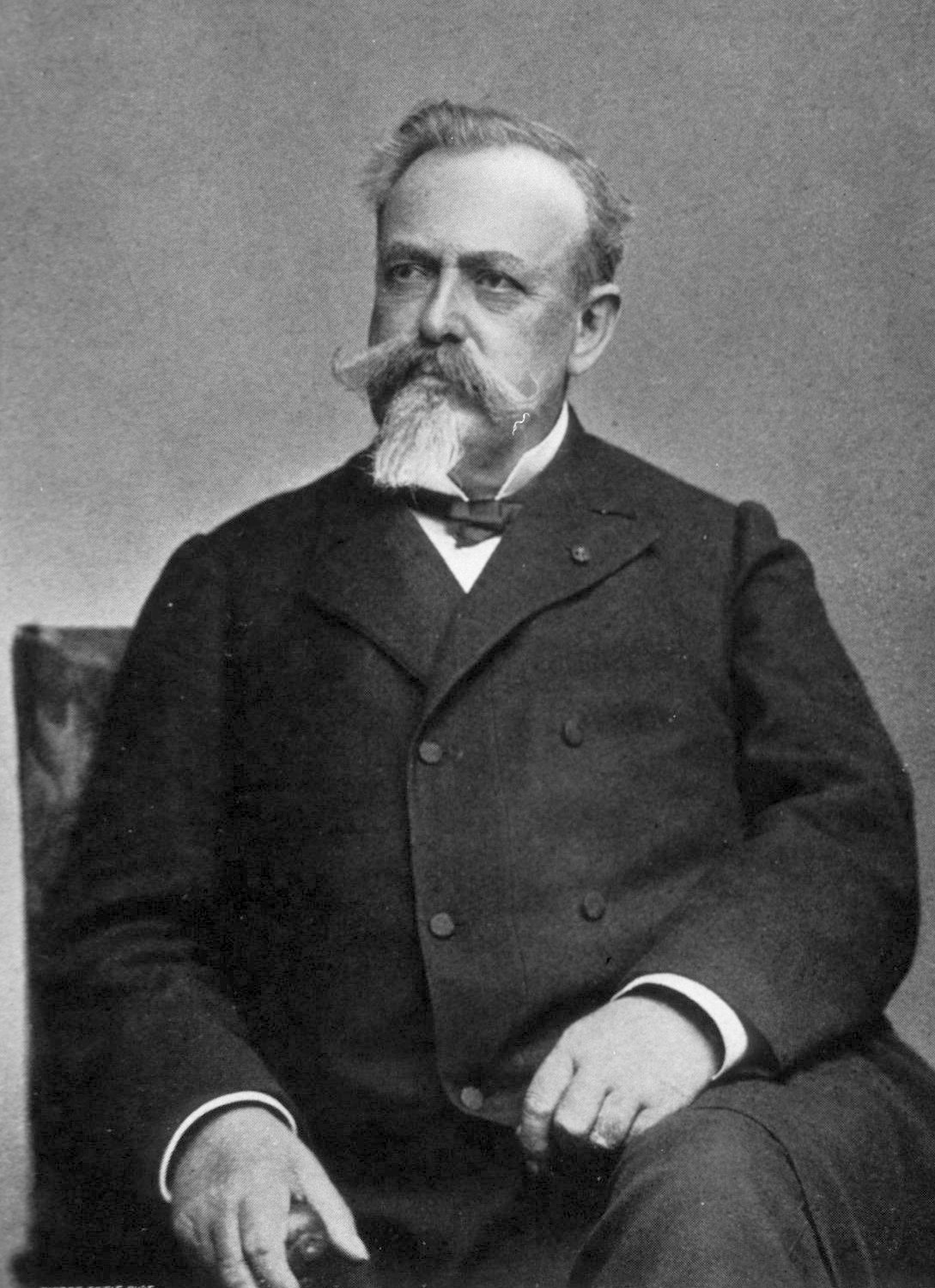
Léon Clément Le Fort

Léon Clément Le Fort (French: [leɔ̃ klemɑ̃ lə fɔʁ]; 5 December 1829, Lille – 19 October 1893) was a French surgeon remembered for his work on uterine prolapse, including Le Fort's operation. He also described Le Fort's fracture of the ankle and Le Fort's amputation of the foot.

== Biography ==
Léon Le Fort undertook medical training in Paris under Joseph-François Malgaigne and Stanislas Laugier, and was awarded his doctorate in 1858. He volunteered in the Second Italian War of Independence from 1859, and became prosector at the Paris medical faculty in 1861. Between 1865 and 1872 he worked as surgeon to the Paris hospitals Hospice des enfants-assistés, Hôpital du Midi, Hôpital Cochin, Hôpital Laboisière and Hôpital Beaujon, and was head of a field hospital in Metz during the Franco-Prussian War.

In 1873 he became professor of surgery at the Paris medical faculty and surgeon at Hôtel-Dieu de Paris. He was awarded the Légion d'honneur in 1870, and promoted to the rank of Officier in 1882. He was elected member of the Académie Nationale de Médecine in 1876; he became its president in 1893 but died later in the same year.

Léon Le Fort was the uncle and godfather of French army surgeon René Le Fort, and the son-in-law of Joseph-François Malgaigne.

== Legacy ==
Le Fort's work covered a broad spectrum of surgery, orthopaedic surgery, gynaecology, pregnancy and military surgery. He published articles on resection of the knee (Note: De la résection de genou. (1859)) and hip, (Note: De la résection de la hanche. (1861)) uterine prolapse and its treatment, (Note: Des vices de conformation de l’utérus et de vagin et des moyens de remédier. (1863)) and pregnancy. (Note: Des maternités. (1866)) He discovered communication between bronchial and pulmonary vessels, (Note: Recherches sur l’anatomie des poumons chez l’homme. (1858)) and was a proponent of asepsis in hospitals in France and England before bacteriology was established. (Note: Note sur l’hygiène hospitalière en France et en Angleterre. (1862))

A number of Le Fort's descriptions and inventions still bear his name:

- Le Fort's fracture of the ankle – vertical fracture of the distal fibula with avulsion of the lateral malleolus.
- Le Fort's amputation – osteoplastic amputation of the foot, removing part of the os calcis.
- Le Fort's operation – operation for uterine prolapse.
- Le Fort's sound – curved sound used to treat urethral strictures in male patients.
