= Lefort =

Lefort is a surname. Notable people with the surname include:

- Cecily Margot Lefort, French World War II heroine
- Claude Lefort, French political philosopher
- Elizabeth Lefort (1914–2005), Canadian artist
- Enzo Lefort, French foil fencer
- Franz Lefort, Russian admiral
- Sylvester Lefort, French wrestler

== See also ==
- Lefort (ship), a Russian ship of the line
- Le Fort (disambiguation)
