= Joseph-François Malgaigne =

French surgeon (1806–1865)

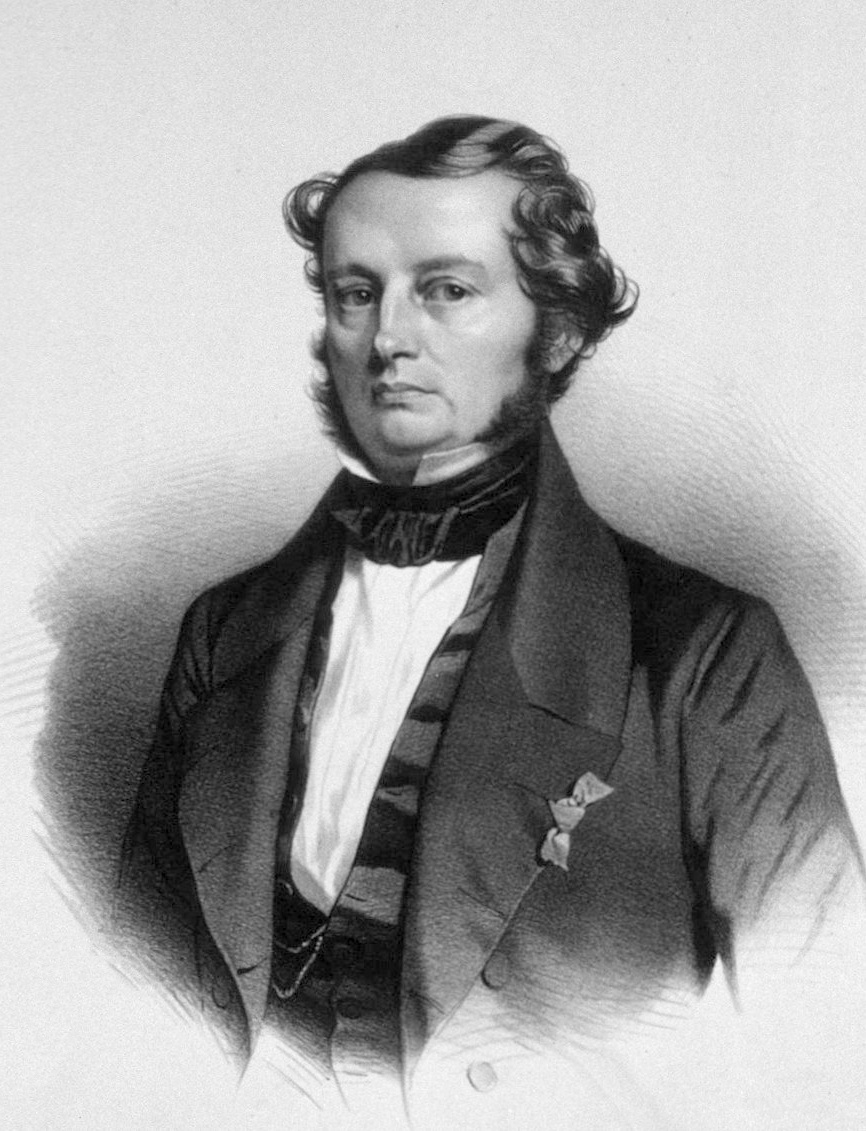
Joseph-François Malgaigne (1806–1865)

Joseph-François Malgaigne (14 February 1806 – 17 October 1865) was a French surgeon and medical historian born in Charmes-sur-Moselle, Vosges.

He studied medicine in Paris, and was later a surgeon of Parisian hospitals, including Hôpitals Saint-Louis, Charité and Beaujon. At the Hôpital Saint-Louis he was a colleague of Auguste Nélaton (1807–1873). Malgaigne was father-in-law to surgeon Léon Clément Le Fort (1829–1893). In 1846 he became a member of the Académie de Médecine.

Malgaigne is known for his work with bone fractures and dislocations, specializing in orthopedic surgery of the knee, hip and shoulder. In 1834 he published Manuel de medecine operatoire, an influential work on surgical techniques. This book was later translated into several languages. In 1843 Malgaigne, together with Germanicus Mirault designed a flap transposition procedure to close cleft lips.

As an advocate of statistical analysis in medicine, he is remembered for conducting statistical hospital surveys in Paris. As an historian, he was a scholar of the works of Hippocrates and editor of Ambroise Paré's writings. In 1841 he was founder of the surgical journal, Journal de chirurgie.

== Associated eponyms ==
- "Malgaigne's amputation": Subastragalar amputation; an amputation of the foot in which the astragalus is conserved.
- "Malgaigne's fracture": Vertical pelvic fracture with bilateral sacroiliac dislocation and fracture of the pubic rami.
- "Malgaigne's hernia": Infantile inguinal hernia prior to the descent of the testis.
- "Malgaigne's luxation": Partial dislocation of the head of the radius within the elbow joint. Also known as "nursemaid's elbow".
- "Malgaigne's triangle": Also known as the superior carotid triangle, or as "Malgaigne's fossa".

== Selected writings ==
- Manuel de medecine operatoire; 1834
- Traité d'anatomie chirurgicale et de chirurgie expérimentale; 1838
- Œuvres complètes d’Ambroise Paré, revues et collationnées sur toutes les éditions antérieures, Paris, Baillière, 1840–1841, 3 volumes in-8, edition illustrated by a frontispice, a portrait and 217 figures in the text by Antoine Chazal (1793–1854).
- Traité des fractures et des luxations; 1847. 1853 edition at the Internet Archive
