= Le Fort fracture =

Le Fort fracture can refer to:

- Le Fort fracture of skull
- Le Fort fracture of ankle
