= Richard Trauner =

Australia oral surgeon

Richard Trauner (27 August 1900 – 31 May 1980) was an Austrian oral surgeon. Trauner is known for introducing the procedure of Sagittal Split Osteotomy to the United States in the 1960s with Hugo Obwegeser.

== Life ==
Trauner was born in Austria. After three years of general surgery training under the tutelage of von Eiselsberg, he entered dentistry and oral and maxillofacial surgery under the tutelage of his uncle Hans Pichler at the Pichler School.

Trauner's research focused on mandibular dysplasia, pre-prosthetic surgery, orthognathic surgery and cleft palate and lip surgery.

Trauner was the Chair of Dentistry and Maxillofacial Surgery at the University of Graz, Austria from 1947 to 1971. Obwegeser studied under Trauner at the university. Trauner and Obwegeser introduced the horizontal osteotomy of the mandibular symphysis through the intraoral approach.
