= Héric =

Héric Éri (Gallo) Hierig (Breton)
- Commune
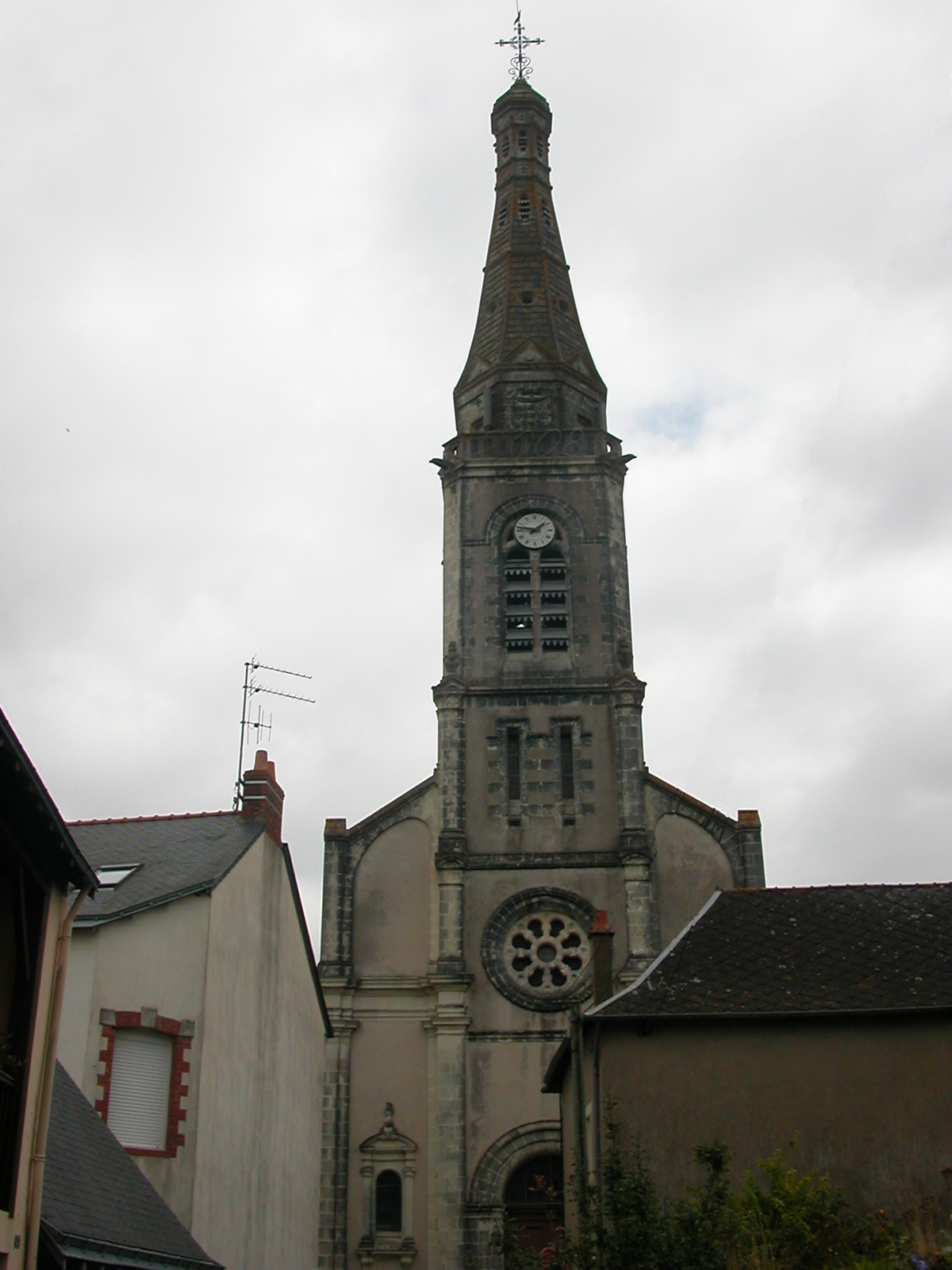

- Coat of arms
- Location of Héric
- Location within France Location within Pays de la Loire
- Coordinates: 47°24′48″N 1°39′02″W
- Country: France
- Region: Pays de la Loire
- Department: Loire-Atlantique
- Arrondissement: Châteaubriant-Ancenis
- Canton: Nort-sur-Erdre
- Intercommunality: Erdre et Gesvres

Government
  - Mayor (2020–2026): Jean-Pierre Joutard
- Area^{1}: 73.93 km^{2} (28.54 sq mi)
- Highest elevation: 66 m (217 ft)
- Lowest elevation: 17 m (56 ft)
- Population (2023): 6,585
  - Density: 89.07/km^{2} (230.7/sq mi)
- Time zone: UTC+01:00 (CET)
  - Summer (DST): UTC+02:00 (CEST)
- INSEE/Postal code: 44073 /44810
- ^{1} French Land Register data, which excludes lakes, ponds, glaciers > 1 km^{2} (0.386 sq mi or 247 acres) and river estuaries.

Héric (French pronunciation: [eʁik]; Gallo: Éri, Breton: Hierig) is a commune in the Loire-Atlantique department in western France.

== Population ==
Historical population

Year	Pop.	±% p.a.
1793	2,815	—
1800	2,645	−0.89%
1806	2,751	+0.66%
1821	3,116	+0.83%
1831	3,349	+0.72%
1841	3,927	+1.60%
1846	3,804	−0.63%
1851	4,474	+3.30%
1856	4,540	+0.29%
1861	4,595	+0.24%
1866	4,691	+0.41%
1872	4,161	−1.98%
1876	4,248	+0.52%
1881	4,244	−0.02%
1886	4,233	−0.05%
1891	4,048	−0.89%
1896	3,950	−0.49%
1901	3,843	−0.55%

Year	Pop.	±% p.a.
1906	3,895	+0.27%
1911	3,812	−0.43%
1921	3,280	−1.49%
1926	3,240	−0.25%
1931	3,111	−0.81%
1936	3,054	−0.37%
1946	2,956	−0.33%
1954	2,800	−0.68%
1962	2,624	−0.81%
1968	2,531	−0.60%
1975	2,521	−0.06%
1982	3,140	+3.19%
1990	3,378	+0.92%
1999	3,987	+1.86%
2007	4,902	+2.62%
2012	5,606	+2.72%
2017	6,049	+1.53%
2023	6,585	+1.43%

Source: EHESS and INSEE (1968-2023)

== Personalities ==
One of its most famous citizens is Paul Tessier, father of craniofacial surgery.

== See also ==
- Communes of the Loire-Atlantique department
