= Germanicus Mirault =

French surgeon

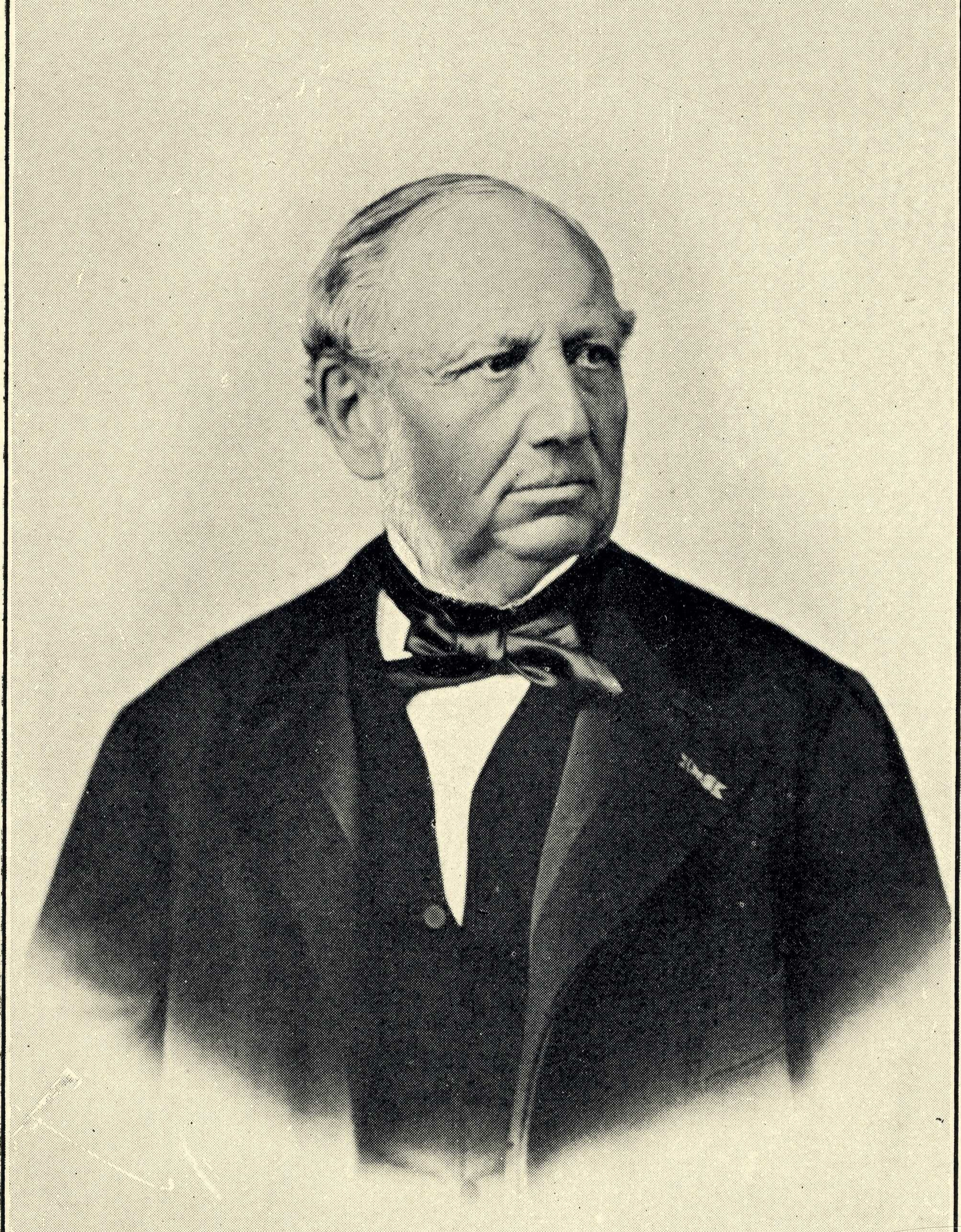
- Born: 1796; Angers, France
- Died: January 19, 1879 (aged 82)
- Scientific career
- Fields: Surgery

Germanicus Mirault was a French surgeon who pioneered cleft lip surgery.

== Early life ==
Germanicus Mirault was born in Angers on either 29 February or 1 March 1796 (1796 was a leap year). His father and grandfather were also surgeons, with his father specialising in ophthalmology.

== Education ==
Mirault first began studying medicine under his father in 1814. Moving to Paris to continue his studies, he presented his thesis in 1823 on keratitis.

== Medical career ==
Together with Joseph-François Malgaigne, Mirault introduced flap transposition for cleft-lip closure. In 1935, this work was championed by Victor Veau, who stated "Mirault is the genius of cleft lip surgery". He made other key contributions to maxillofacial surgical procedures, including the first ligature of a human lingual artery in 1833 and pioneering a method of temporary occlusion of the eyelids when correcting a post-burn ectropion, which is still in use today.

== Awards ==
Mirault was awarded by the Académie des Sciences in 1869 for his work on eyelid surgery.

== Death ==
Mirault died on 19 January 1879 in Angers.
