= Wagstaffe–Le Fort avulsion fracture =

Le Fort's fracture of the ankle is a vertical fracture of the antero-medial part of the distal fibula with avulsion of the anterior tibiofibular ligament, opposite to a Tillaux-Chaput avulsion fracture

The injury was described by Léon Clément Le Fort in 1886.

== See also ==
- Ankle fracture
