= Lefortovo =

Lefortovo may refer to:

- Lefortovo District, a district in South-Eastern Administrative Okrug of Moscow, Russia
- Lefortovo Prison, a prison in Moscow, Russia
- Lefortovo Tunnel, a road tunnel in Moscow, Russia
- Lefortovo Hill, one of the seven hills of Moscow, Russia
- Lefortovo (Moscow Metro), a station on the Moscow Metro
