= Condylar hyperplasia =

Over-enlargement of the jawbone (mandible)

- Other names: Mandibular hyperplasia

Condylar hyperplasia (mandibular hyperplasia) is over-enlargement of the mandible bone in the skull. It was first described by Robert Adams in 1836 who related it to the overdevelopment of mandible. In humans, the mandibular bone has two condyles which are known as growth centers of the mandible. When growth at the condyle exceeds its normal time span, it is referred to as condylar hyperplasia. The most common form of condylar hyperplasia is unilateral condylar hyperplasia where one condyle overgrows the other condyle leading to facial asymmetry. Hugo Obwegeser et al. classified condylar hyperplasia into two categories: hemimandibular hyperplasia and hemimandibular elongation. It is estimated that about 30% of people with facial asymmetry express condylar hyperplasia.

In 1986, Obwegeser and Makek specifically detailed two hemimandibular anomalies, hemimandibular hyperplasia and hemimandibular elongation. These anomalies can be clinically present in a pure form or in combination.

== Cause ==
Condylar hyperplasia has an unknown cause. Several theories exist in literature which related to the cause of condylar hyperplasia. One theory states that an event of a trauma leading to increase in number of repair mechanism and hormones in that area may lead to increase in growth of mandible on that side. Another theory states that an increase in loading of the temporomandibular joint can lead to increase in expression of bone forming molecules. Condylar hyperplasia predominantly affects women with 64% of patients being women.

== Diagnosis ==
Diagnosis of asymmetry can be done through many different methods. PA cephalometry, panoramic radiograph, and nuclear imaging are some of the techniques that can be used for diagnosis. Primarily nuclear imaging techniques such as single-photon emission computed tomography (SPECT), positron emission tomography (PET), and bone scintigraphy are taken along with other data before a patient is diagnosed for Condylar Hyperplasia. In SPECT imaging, an increase uptake of the isotope is seen on the affected in comparison to the non-affected side. A difference of at least 10% or a minimum ratio of 55% to 45% uptake of technetium-99m is seen when comparing affected vs non-affected side respectively. An uptake of more than 55% and difference of at least 10% indicates an active condylar growth.

=== Classification ===
Hugo Obwegesr and Makek classified condylar hyperplasia into three categories, listed in the table below. Type 1 develops its characteristics from the horizontal vector, and Type 2 develops its characteristics from the vertical vector. Type 1 CH occurs much more common (15x) than Type 2 CH. Wolford et al. in 2014, developed an updated classification of condylar hyperplasia. In 1986, Slootweg & Muller devised a histopathological classification which allows the condylar tissues to be classified into specific categories.

Type	Name	Clinical findings	Histological findings
Type 1	Hemimandibular elongation	Chin deviation towards contralateral side; Midline shift towards contralateral side; Posterior crossbite on contralateral side	Excessive growth in the horizontal vector; Enlarged ramus, normal condyle
Type 2	Hemimandibular hyperplasia	Sloping rima oris with minimal chin deviation; Supra-eruption of maxillary molars on affected side; Open bite; Midline shift (minimal to none)	Excessive growth in the vertical vector; Excessive growth in the condylar head
Type 3	Combination of both	Chin deviation towards contralateral side; Possible open bite; Sloping rima oris with possible chin deviation	Combination of excessive growth in both vectors

== Treatment ==
Many treatment options exist for this type of condition. Orthognathic surgery can be performed once the active condylar growth has finished in some cases. The point of this surgery to wait as long as the condyle is growing and only do surgery when the condyle stops growing, so the chances of any worsening of facial asymmetry lessens. This option, however, does include a person living with the facial asymmetry features all the way up until 18 to 19 years of age. A procedure called condylectomy can also be done which involves removing part of the growing condyle to arrest any active growth. Sometimes condylectomy can be done in conjunction with articular disk repositioning and orthognathic surgery to treat patients with mandibular hyperplasia, such as shown by Wolford et al.
