= Bronchial vessels =

Bronchial vessels may refer to:

- bronchial artery
- bronchial veins
