= Dentofacial deformity =

Deformity in the jaw or mandible

It is estimated that nearly 30% of the general population present with malocclusions that are in great need of orthodontic treatment. However, the term dentofacial deformity describes an array of dental and maxillo-mandibular abnormalities, often presenting with a malocclusion, which is not amenable to orthodontic treatment alone and definitive treatment needs surgical alignment of upper/lower jaws or both (orthognathic surgery). Individuals with dentofacial deformities often present with lower quality of life and compromised functions with respect to breathing, swallowing, chewing, speech articulation, and lip closure/posture. It is estimated that about 5% of general population present with dentofacial deformities that are not amenable to orthodontic treatment only. and patients with Class III malocclusion appear to form the majority of these patients.

Facial skeletal deformity can be in the form of maxillary prognathism/retrognathism (pushed out or deficient upper jaw), mandibular prognathism/retrognathism (pushed out or deficient lower jaw/receding chin), open bite (upper and lower front teeth do not meet), transverse discrepancies and asymmetry of the Jaws (very narrow/wide upper or lower jaws, shifting upper/lower jaws to right/left side), and long/short faces.

Surgical correction of dentofacial deformities started around 1849 in the USA by Simon Hullihen, a general surgeon and dentist, and was limited to the correction of the mandible (prognathism). Later on, around the turn of the twentieth century, early orthognathic surgery was born, when in St. Louis Edward Angle (orthodontist) and Vilray Blair (surgeon) started to work together and Blair stressed the importance of collaboration between surgeon and orthodontist. However, modern orthognathic surgery started to develop in central Europe by surgeons such as R. Trauner (Graz), Martin Wassmund (Berlin), Heinz Köle (Graz) and Hugo Obwegeser (Zurich).
