= Journal of Craniofacial Surgery =

- Discipline: Surgery
- Language: English
- Edited by: Mutaz B. Habal

Publication details
- History: 1990
- Publisher: Lippincott Williams & Wilkins
- Frequency: 8
- Open access: Hybrid
- Impact factor: 1.0 (2023)

Standard abbreviations
- ISO 4: J. Craniofacial Surg.

Indexing
- ISSN: 1049-2275 (print); 1536-3732 (web)
- OCLC no.: 21186847

Links
- Journal homepage

The Journal of Craniofacial Surgery is a peer-reviewed medical journal that serves as a forum of communication for all professionals involved in craniofacial surgery, maxillofacial surgery, and pediatric plastic surgery. Its coverage ranges from the practical aspects of craniofacial procedures to the basic sciences underlying surgical practice. The journal publishes original research articles, scientific reviews, editorials, invited commentaries, abstracts, and selected articles from international journals, as well as occasional international bibliographies related to craniofacial surgery.

Following its initial establishment efforts in 1985, the journal was first published in 1990.
