= Face-bow =

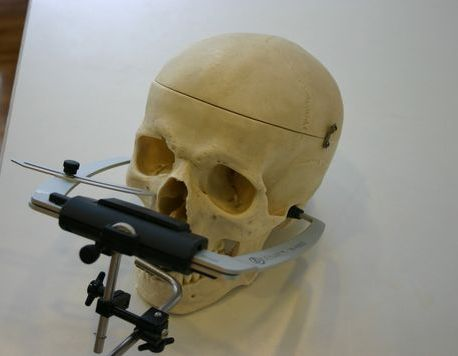
Skull model fitted with a face bow

A face-bow is a dental instrument used in the field of prosthodontics. Its purpose is to transfer functional and aesthetic components from patient's mouth to the dental articulator. Specifically, it transfers the relationship of maxillary arch and temporomandibular joint to the casts. It records the upper model's (maxilla) relationship to the External Acoustic Meatus, in the hinge axis. It aids in mounting maxillary cast on the articulator.

== Parts of Face-bow ==
U-shaped frame - forms the main part of the frame with remaining components attached to it by clamps. Frame extends from the region of TMJ or external acoustic meatus to a distance of 2-3 inches in front of the face.

Condylar rods – are positioned 13 mm anterior to the auditory meatus on the Canto-Tragal line. This placement generally locates the rods within 5 mm of the true centre of the opening hinge axis of the jaw.

Bite fork – consist of stem and prongs. Wax material is usually attached to the bite fork, and the bite fork is held in contact with maxillary jaw or mandibular jaw in kinematic face-bow.

Locking device – helps to attach the bite fork to the U-shaped frame.

Orbital pointer with clamp – used as a third reference point. The pointer tip is placed in the contact with infraorbital notch which is 43 mm above the incisal edge of the right incisors.

== Types ==
- Kinematic Face-bow - It orients jaw to actual hinge axis
- Arbitrary Face-bow - It orients maxilla on an arbitrary hinge axis
  - Facia Type (With orbital indicator)
  - Ear Piece Type (With nasal relator)
  - Hanau face-to-face (spring bow)
  - Slidematic (Denar)
  - Twirl bow
  - Whipmix

== History ==
George B. Snow is credited as the inventor of face-bow. In his version of face-bow, he positioned the plaster cast in the articulator in respect to the distance of the median incisal point from the condyles and all the other points on the occlusal plane. Snow attempted to give the occlusal plane an individual position also in this third dimension : and in order to achieve this he set about as follows. He fixed his bite-fork in the upper occlusion rim in such away that the handle, when the rim was placed in the patient's mouth. was parallel with a plane extending from the bottom of the glenoid fossa and passing through the anterior nasal spine. This plane cannot be determined directly on a living person; but it approximately corresponds with a line drawn from the upper part of the tragus to the lower edge of the nostril. In American literature, this plane is known as the Bromell plane, in Europe as the Camper plane. Snow then placed the bite-fork horizontally when the casts were mounted in the articulator.
