= Paul Tessier =

French maxillofacial surgeon (1917–2008)

Paul Tessier (August 1917 – June 6, 2008) was a French maxillofacial surgeon and one of the founders of plastic surgery. He was considered the father of modern craniofacial surgery.

== Biography ==
Born in Héric, Loire-Atlantique, Dr. Tessier first attended the Ecole de Médecine in Nantes, Loire-Atlantique, eventually receiving his Doctor of Medicine degree from the Faculté de Médecine de Paris in 1943. In 1942, during internship he started operating on people with cleft lip and cleft palate and Dupuytren's contracture. He joined the pediatric surgery service at Hospital St. Joseph in Paris in 1944. From late 1944 to 1946, he worked at the Center of Maxillofacial Surgery of the Military Region of Paris in Hospital Puteaux. In 1949, he returned to Nantes to become a surgical consultant in ophthalmology.

Dr. Tessier started to improve surgical techniques to correct craniofacial deformations in the mid-1950s. He performed his first craniofacial operation in 1967. Throughout the 1960s and 1970s, he developed the following methods:

- Using autogeneous (patient's own) bone grafts instead of silicone or acrylic to modify skull and facial contours.
- Transcranial and subcranial correction of orbital hypertelorism.
- Techniques for correcting Treacher Collins syndrome.
- Correction of craniofacial clefts.

In the 1970s, he began traveling to the United States to demonstrate his procedures. Today, his techniques are applied not only to plastic and maxillofacial surgery, but also other specialties such as trauma and neurosurgery. He was an honorary member of the American College of Surgeons, the Royal College of Surgeons at London, and the American Society of Plastic Surgeons.

== Positions and awards ==
- International Society of Craniofacial Surgery, Founding Member
- European Association of Oral and Maxillofacial Surgeons, Founding Member
- Jacobson Innovation Award, 2000
