= Piezoelectric surgery =

Piezoelectric bone surgery is a process that utilizes piezoelectric vibrations in the application of cutting bone tissue. The process was patented by Fernando Bianchetti, Domenico Vercellotti, and Tomaso Vercellotti. It was first used clinically in 1988. It is indicated for use in oral, maxillofacial, cranial and spinal procedures; but is mainly used in orthodontics and craniofacial surgery.

By adjusting the ultrasonic frequency of the device, it is possible to cut hard tissue while leaving soft tissue untouched by the process. The ultrasonic frequency is modulated from 10, 30, and 60 cycles/s (Hz) to 29 kHz. The low frequency enables cutting of mineralized structures, not soft tissue. Power can be adjusted from 2.8 to 16 W, with preset power settings for various types of bone density. The tip vibrates within a range of 60–200 μm, which allows clean cutting with precise incisions. In 2020 an article on the topic of piezoelectricity have named piezoelectric surgery as one of the most important applications of this concept, in addition to medical ultrasound imaging. Additionally in 2021 the Malhotra laboratory at Penn Neurosurgery has published additional work on this procedure for rare cancers of the spinal column.

== See also ==
- Surgery
- Piezomagnetism
- Piezoelectricity
