= Le Fort osteotomy =

Sectioning of the maxilla

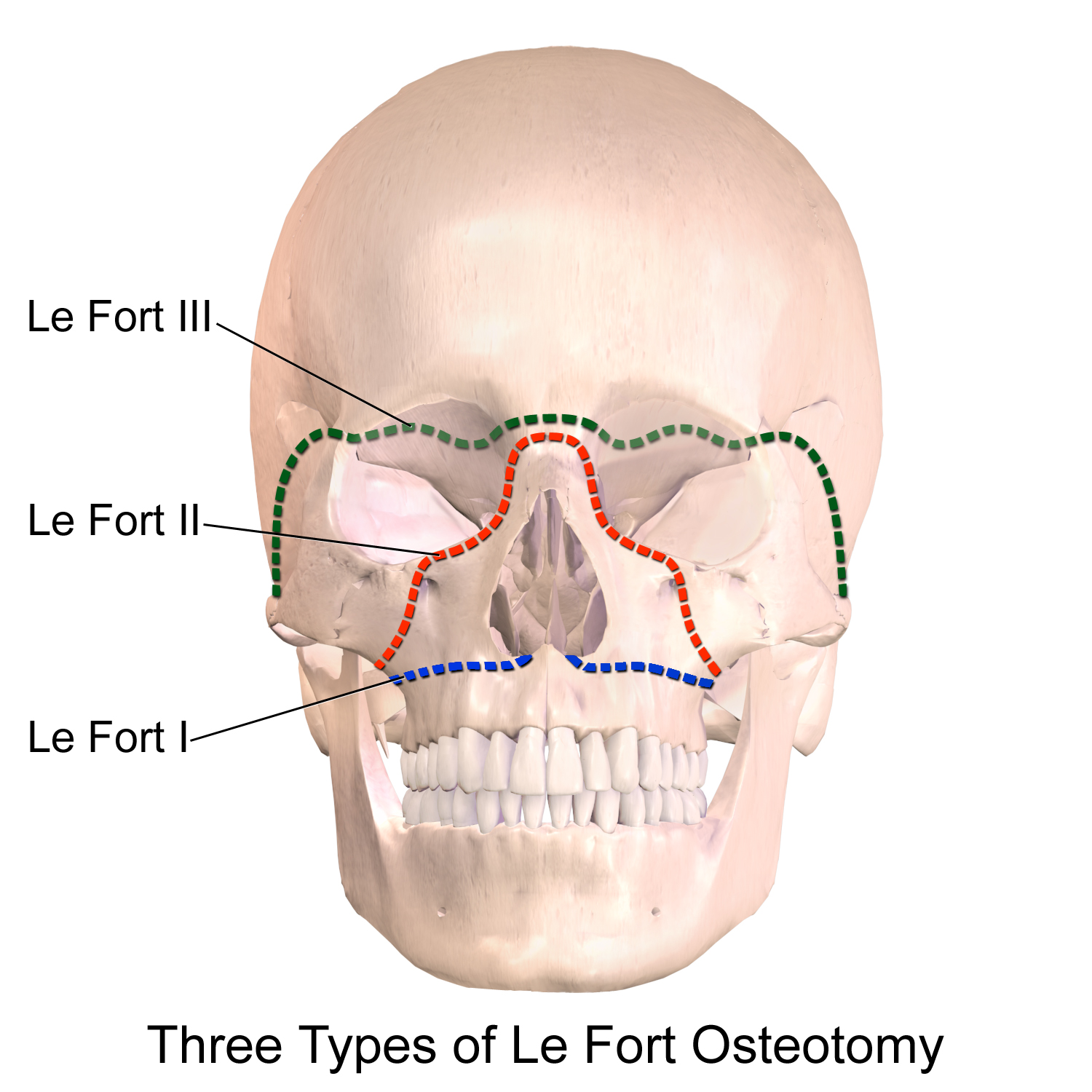
- MeSH: D019340

A Le Fort osteotomy is the name for three types of osteotomies of the jaw and face. They are based on the analogous bone fractures described by the French surgeon and physician René Le Fort.

== Type I ==
A Le Fort I osteotomy surgically moves the upper jaw to correct misalignment and deformities. It is used in the treatment for several conditions, including skeletal class II malocclusion, cleft lip and cleft palate, vertical maxillary excess (VME) or deficiency, and some specific types of facial trauma, particularly those affecting the mid-face. The procedure involves separating the upper jaw, repositioning it, and then securing it with plates and screws.

== Type II ==
The Le Fort II osteotomy treats maxillary fractures.

== Type III ==
The Le Fort III osteotomy treats midfacial abnormalities and deficiencies.

== Additional types ==
"Le Fort IV" has been used to describe a monobloc frontofacial osteotomy in 2000s French literature, but the use is heavily disputed. In 2014, the same term was used by a Japanese group to describe a "monobloc minus Le Fort I" osteotomy.
