= Distraction osteogenesis =

Gradual bone lengthening

- The periosteum appears just below the skin.

- bone marrow

Identifiers
- MeSH: D019857

Distraction osteogenesis (DO), also called callus distraction, callotasis and osteodistraction, is a process used in orthopedic surgery, podiatric surgery, and oral and maxillofacial surgery to repair skeletal deformities and in reconstructive surgery. The procedure involves cutting and slowly separating bone, allowing the bone healing process to fill in the gap.

== Medical uses ==
Distraction osteogenesis (DO) is used in orthopedic surgery, and oral and maxillofacial surgery to repair skeletal deformities and in reconstructive surgery. It was originally used to treat problems like unequal leg length, but since the 1980s is most commonly used to treat issues like hemifacial microsomia, micrognathism (chin so small it causes health problems), craniofrontonasal dysplasias, craniosynostosis, as well as airway obstruction in babies caused by glossoptosis (tongue recessed too far back in the mouth) or micrognathism.

In 2016, a systematic review of papers describing bone and soft tissue outcomes of DO procedures on the lower jawbone was published; the authors had planned to do a meta-analysis but found the studies were too poor in quality and too heterogeneous to pool. From what they were able to generalize, the authors found there was significant relapse in the vertical plane for bone, and a higher risk of relapse when there was an initial high gonial angle or Jarabak ratio (sella–gonion/nasion–menton). For soft tissue, little evidence was available regarding the vertical dimension, while a 90% correspondence between skeletal and soft tissue was found for sagittal positioning; the dental-to-soft tissue agreement was around 20%.

A 2018 Cochrane review of DO on the upper jawbone to treat cleft lip and cleft palate compared with orthognathic surgery found only one study, involving 47 participants and performed between 2002 and 2008 at the University of Hong Kong. This was not sufficient evidence from which to generalize, but the authors noted that while both procedures produced notable hard and soft tissue improvements, the DO group had greater advancement of the maxillary and less horizontal relapse five years after surgery. There was no difference in speech or nasal emissions outcomes nor in adverse effects; the DO group had lower satisfaction at three months after surgery but higher at two years.

== Procedure ==
In the first phase, called the "osteotomy/surgical phase", the bone is cut, either partially, only through the hard exterior, or completely, and a device is fitted which will be used in the next phases. In the second phase, the latency period, which lasts generally seven days, the appliance is not activated and early stages of bone healing are allowed. In the third phase, the "distraction phase", the device, which is mounted to the bone on each side of the cut, is used to gradually separate the two pieces, allowing new bone to form in the gap. When the desired or possible length is reached, which usually takes three to seven days, a consolidation phase follows in which the device keeps the bone stable to allow the bone to fully heal. After the consolidation phase, the device is removed in a second surgical procedure.

The device is usually manually operated by twisting a rod that separates the bone using a rack and pinion or similar system; the rate of separation is carefully determined because going too quickly can cause nonunion, in which unstable fibrous connective tissue is formed instead of bone, and going too slowly can allow premature union to occur. Generally the rate is about a millimeter per day, achieved in two steps per day. The frequency of steps and how much the device is moved at each step, is called the "rhythm". The devices sometimes contain a spring that provides tension to continually separate the bones, instead of being manually operated at set intervals.

In addition to these manually operated systems, there are also motorized systems like the Fitbone from Wittenstein. The Fitbone is a fully implantable, motorized, lengthening and correction nail. Advantages of this device are accurate deformity correction, low scar tissue formation, and reduced risk of infection. Furthermore, the patients describe the procedure as more comfortable than limb lengthening with mechanical systems.

== Risks ==
Risks include infection (5% overall, with 1% of those requiring pin removal and the bone becoming infected in 0.5%), failure of bone to grow in the desired direction (between 7 and 9%), hardware failure (between 3 and 4.5%), failure to follow the distraction protocol (4.5% overall; too slow 2% and too fast 0.5%), 1% pain due to distraction ending the procedure; damage to the inferior alveolar nerve occurs in 3.5% of mandibular distraction, tooth bud injury in 2%, and facial nerve injury in 0.5% of cases.

== History ==
The procedure was first proposed by Bernhard von Langenbeck in 1869, but the first publication of efforts to implement it clinically was by Alessandro Codivilla in 1905. The paper presented the results of efforts to treat 26 people who were born with malformed legs; Codivilla cut the femur, put a pin in the heel bone, and applied traction to each person. His paper showed high levels of complications, including infection, tissue death, and bones that failed to join, and his methods were not adopted.

The Russian orthopedic surgeon Gavriil Ilizarov studied DO methods in over 15,000 people starting in the 1950s; he developed external fixation devices and methods to separate severed leg bones gradually, and using them he determined optimal rates of separation. His work led to widespread use of DO.

The first use in the jaw was pioneered by Wolfgang Rosenthal in 1930 but it was not further explored until the 1980s; the first paper of the modern era describing clinical use was published in 1992.

== Society and culture ==
In India, cosmetic limb-lengthening surgery is of high demand but is also a unregulated industry. Height is considered highly attractive in India and cosmetic limb-lengthening has been used by young Indians to improve marriage and career prospects. Others have used it in preparation for a new job in foreign countries such as the United States. A possible cause might be that American and British men (with average heights of 5 feet 9.5 inches and 5 feet 9.75 inches, respectively) are around 5 inches taller than Indian men. One surgeon in India stated: "This is one of the most difficult cosmetic surgeries to perform, and people are doing it after just one or two months' fellowship, following a doctor who is probably experimenting himself. There are no colleges, no proper training, nothing."

People as young as 13 or 14 of age have undergone the procedure in India. Some patients have received infections and have had to undergo additional surgeries months later to regain the ability to walk, while others found that they gained less height than expected. Other patients have said the surgeons had misled them about the potential complications and dangers of the surgery.

In 2006, limb lengthening was banned by China's Ministry of Health after a series of operations resulting in serious side-effects.

The plot of the 1997 American dystopian science fiction film Gattaca involves one character assuming the identity of another and leg lengthening is depicted as part of the elaborate ploy to achieve this subterfuge, along with the use of various bodily fluids to avoid detection by DNA sequencing.

== Research directions ==
As of 2013, work was underway on distraction devices using Shape-memory alloy that could precisely separate bone without the need for intervention, as well as springs and motors; the use of biopharmaceuticals like BMP in combination with devices was also being explored.

As of 2016, work was underway developing devices and techniques that would allow DO in more directions simultaneously.

== See also ==
- Bone grafting
- Fibrocartilage callus
- National Organization of Short Statured Adults (NOSSA)
- Tissue expansion
- Valgus deformity
