= Orthognathic surgery =

Surgery of the jaw

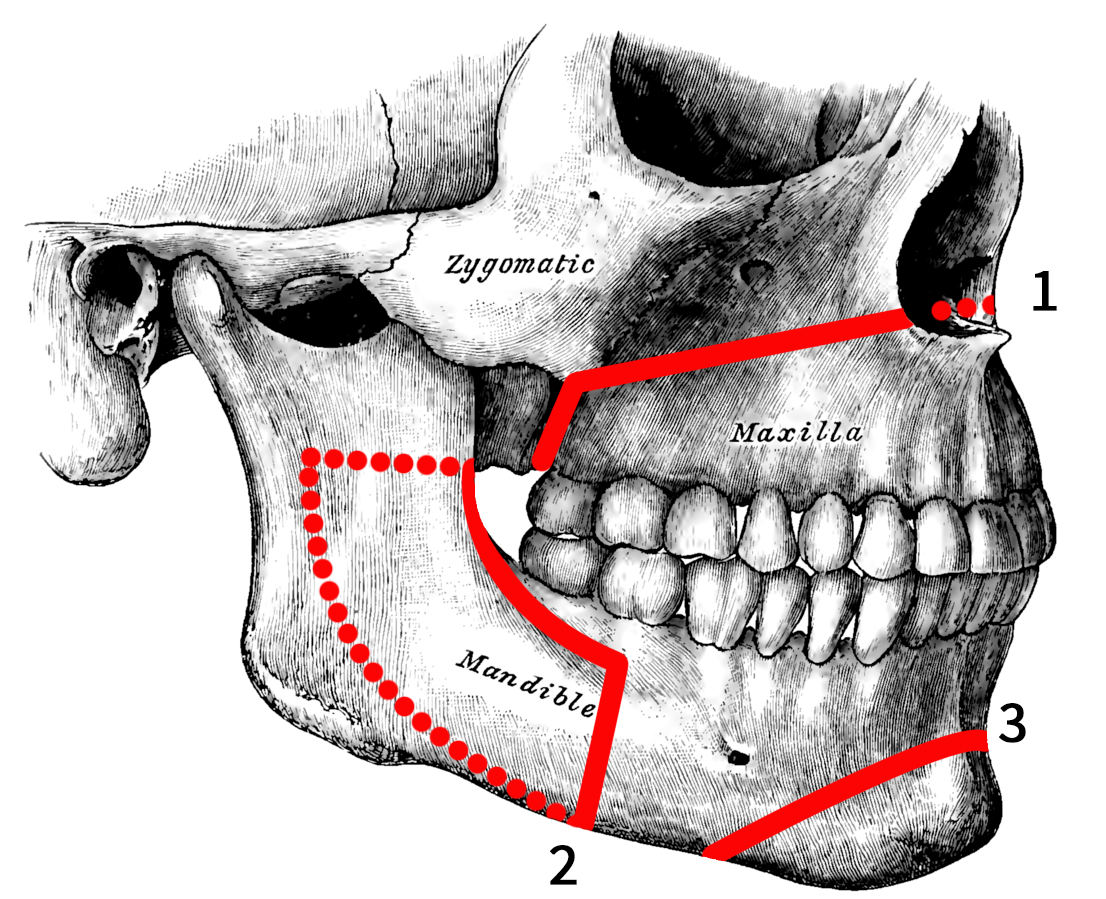
- Osteotomies of the jaws: 1. Le Fort I 2. Bilateral Sagittal Split 3. Genioplasty 4. IMDO 5. GenioPaully 6. Custom PEEK 7. SARME 8. Custom BIMAX; 9. Super BIMAX
- ICD-9-CM: 76.6

Orthognathic surgery (/ˌɔːrθəɡˈnæθɪk/), also known as corrective jaw surgery or simply jaw surgery, is surgery designed to correct conditions of the jaw and lower face related to structure, growth, airway issues including sleep apnea, TMJ disorders, malocclusion problems primarily arising from skeletal disharmonies, and other orthodontic dental bite problems that cannot be treated easily with braces, as well as the broad range of facial imbalances, disharmonies, asymmetries, and malproportions where correction may be considered to improve facial aesthetics and self-esteem.

The origins of orthognathic surgery belong in oral surgery, and the basic operations related to the surgical removal of impacted or displaced teeth – especially where indicated by orthodontics to enhance dental treatments of malocclusion and dental crowding. One of the first published cases of orthognathic surgery was the one from Dr. Simon P. Hullihen in 1849.

Originally coined by Harold Hargis, it was more widely popularised first in Germany and then most famously by Hugo Obwegeser who developed the bilateral sagittal split osteotomy (BSSO). This surgery is also used to treat congenital conditions such as cleft palate. Typically surgery is performed via the mouth, where jaw bone is cut, moved, modified, and realigned to correct malocclusion or dentofacial deformity. The word "osteotomy" means the division of bone by means of a surgical cut.

The "jaw osteotomy", either to the upper jaw or lower jaw (and usually both) allows (typically) an oral and maxillofacial surgeon to surgically align an arch of teeth, or the segment of a dental arch with its associated jawbone, relative to other segments of the dental arches. Working with orthodontists, the coordination of dental arches has primarily been directed to create a working occlusion. As such, orthognathic surgery is seen a secondary procedure supporting a more fundamental orthodontic objective.

It is only recently, and especially with the evolution of oral and maxillofacial surgery in establishing itself as a primary medical specialty – as opposed to its long term status as a dental speciality – that orthognathic surgery has increasingly emerged as a primary treatment for obstructive sleep apnea, as well as for primary facial proportionality or symmetry correction.

Increasingly, as people are more able to self-fund surgery, 3D facial diagnostic and design systems have emerged, as well as new operations that enable for a broad range of jaw correction procedures that have become readily accessible; particularly in private maxillofacial surgical practice. These procedures include IMDO, SARME, GenioPaully, custom BIMAX, and custom PEEK procedures. These procedures are replacing the traditional role of certain orthognathic surgery operations that have for decades served wholly and primarily orthodontic or dental purposes.

== Medical uses ==
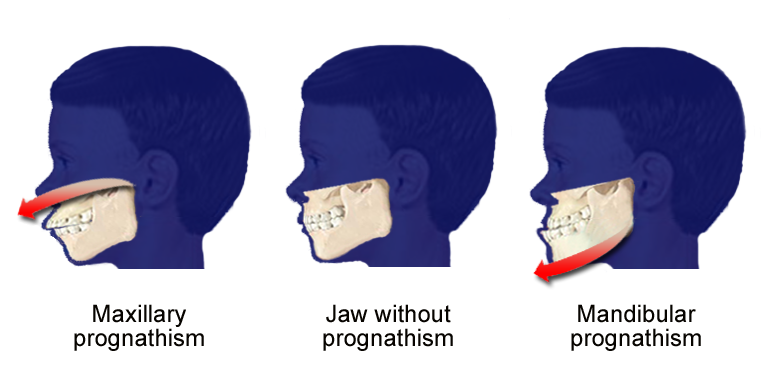

It is estimated that nearly 5% of the UK or US population present with dentofacial deformities that are not amenable to orthodontic treatment requiring orthognathic surgery as a part of their definitive treatment. Orthognathic surgery can be used to correct:

- Gross jaw discrepancies (anteroposterior, vertical, or transverse discrepancies)
- Skeletofacial discrepancies associated with documented sleep apnea, airway defects, and soft tissue discrepancies
- Skeletofacial discrepancies associated with documented temporomandibular joint pathology

A disproportionately grown upper or lower jaw causes dentofacial deformities. Chewing becomes problematic, and may also cause pain due to straining of the jaw muscle and bone. Deformities range from micrognathia, which is when the mandible does not grow far forward enough (over bite), and when the mandible grows too much, causing an under bite; all of which are uncomfortable. Also, a total maxilla osteotomy is used to treat the "long face syndrome", known as the skeptical open bite, idiopathic long face, hyper divergent face, total maxillary alveolar hyperplasia, and vertical maxillary excess. Prior to surgery, surgeons should take x-rays of the patient's jaw to determine the deformity, and to make a plan of procedures. Mandible osteotomies, or corrective jaw surgeries, benefit individuals who have difficulty chewing, swallowing, TMJ pains, excessive wear of the teeth, open bites, overbites, underbites, or a receding chin. The deformities listed above can be perfected by an osteotomy surgery of either the maxilla or mandible (whichever the deformity calls for), which is performed by an oral surgeon who is specialized in the working with both the upper and lower jaws. Orthognathic surgery is also available as a very successful treatment (90–100%) for obstructive sleep apnea.

Cleft lip and palate

Orthognathic surgery is a well established and widely used treatment option for insufficient growth of the maxilla in patients with an orofacial cleft. There is some debate regarding the timing of orthognathic procedures, to maximise the potential for natural growth of the facial skeleton. Patient reported aesthetic outcomes of orthognathic surgery for cleft lip and palate appear to be of overall satisfaction, despite complications that may arise. A potentially significant long-term outcome of orthognathic surgery is impaired maxillary growth, due to scar tissue formation. A 2013 systematic review comparing traditional orthognathic surgery with maxillary distraction osteogenesis found that the evidence was of low quality; it appeared that both procedures might be effective, but suggested distraction osteogenesis might reduce the incidence of long-term relapse. The most common causes of cleft lip and palate are genetic and environmental factors. Clefts are known to occur due to folic acid deficiency, iron and iodine deficiency

== Risks ==
Although infrequent, there can be complications such as bleeding, swelling, infection, nausea and vomiting. Infection rates of up to 7% are reported after orthognathic surgery; antibiotic prophylaxis reduces the risk of surgical site infections when the antibiotics are given during surgery and continued for longer than a day after the operation.

There can also be some post operative facial numbness due to nerve damage. Diagnostics for nerve damage consist of: brush-stroke directional discrimination (BSD), touch detection threshold (TD), warm/cold (W/C) and sharp/blunt discrimination (S/B), electrophysiological tests (mental nerve blink reflex (BR), nerve conduction study (NCS), and cold (CDT) and warm (WDT) detection thresholds. The inferior alveolar nerve, which is a branch of the mandibular nerve, must be identified during surgery and worked around carefully in order to minimize nerve damage. The numbness may be either temporary, or more rarely, permanent. Recovery from the nerve damage typically occurs within three months after repair. Some 3D movements are considered riskier than other ones, such as maxillary impaction.

== Surgery ==
Orthognathic surgery is performed by maxillofacial or an oral surgeon or a plastic surgeon in collaboration with an orthodontist. It often includes braces before and after surgery, and retainers after the final removal of braces. Orthognathic surgery is often needed after reconstruction of cleft palate or other major craniofacial anomalies. Careful coordination between the surgeon and orthodontist is essential to ensure that the teeth will fit correctly after the surgery.

== Planning ==
Planning for the surgery usually involves input from a multidisciplinary team, including oral and maxillofacial surgeons, orthodontists, and occasionally a speech and language therapist. Although it depends on the reason for surgery, working with a speech and language therapist in advance can help minimize potential relapse. The surgery usually results in a noticeable change in the patient's face; a psychological assessment is occasionally required to assess patient's need for surgery and its predicted effect on the patient. Radiographs and photographs are taken to help in the planning. There is also advanced software that can predict the shape of the patient's face after surgery, which is useful for the planning and also explaining the surgery to the patient and the patient's family. Great care needs to be taken during the planning phase to maximize airway patency.

Orthodontics are a critical component of orthognathic surgery. Traditionally the presurgical orthodontic phase can take as long as one year and undertaken with conventional metal braces. However, these days new approaches and paradigms exist including surgery-first and using clear aligner orthodontia (like Invisalign)

=== Sagittal split osteotomy ===
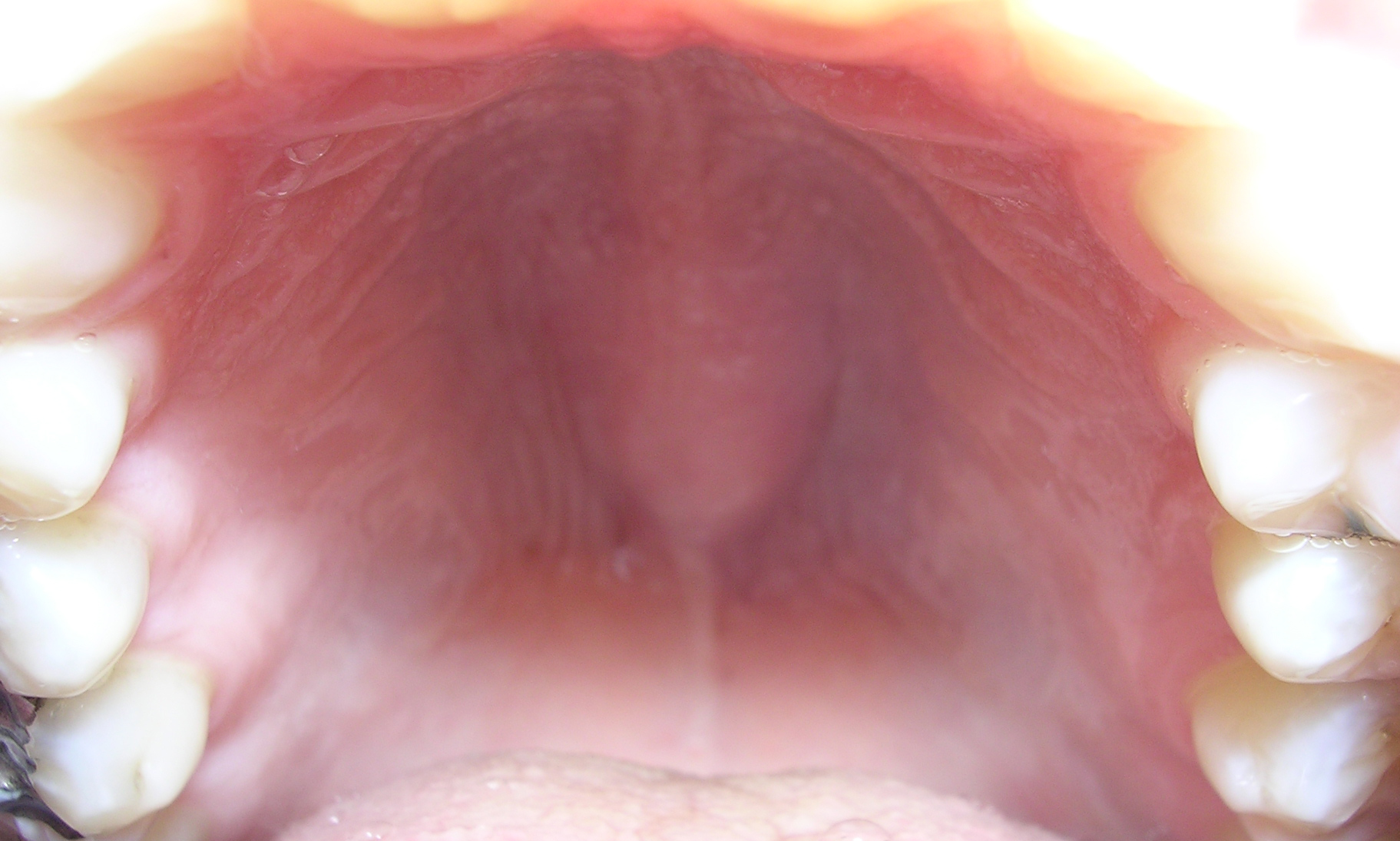
Oral palate unit

This procedure is used to correct mandible retrusion and mandibular prognathism (over and under bite). First, a horizontal cut is made on the inner side of the ramus mandibulae, extending anterally to the anterior portion of the ascending ramus. The cut is then made inferiorly on the ascending ramus to the descending ramus, extending to the lateral border of the mandible in the area between the first and second molar. At this time, a vertical cut is made extending inferior to the body of the mandible, to the inferior border of the mandible. All cuts are made into the middle of the bone, where bone marrow is present. Then, a chisel is inserted into the pre existing cuts and tapped gently in all areas to split the mandible of the left and right side. From here, the mandible can be moved either forwards or backwards. If sliding backwards, the distal segment must be trimmed to provide room in order to slide the mandible backwards. Lastly, the jaw is stabilized using rigid internal fixation (RIF), typically in the form of titanium plates and/or bicortical screws inserted at the osteotomy site. While early techniques required maxillomandibular fixation (wiring the jaw shut) for approximately 4–5 weeks, modern practice generally does not require prolonged wiring.

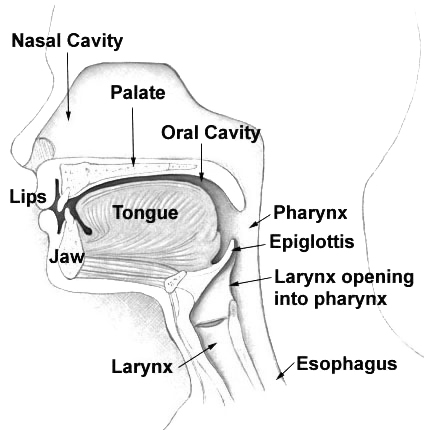
Anatomy of oral cavity and adjacent structures

=== Genioplasty osteotomy (intra-oral) ===
This procedure is used for the advancement (movement forward) or retraction (movement backwards) of the chin. First, incisions are made from the first bicuspid to the first bicuspid, exposing the mandible. Then, soft tissue of the mandible is detached from the bone; done by stripping attaching tissues. A horizontal incision is then made inferior to the first bicuspids, bilaterally, where bone cuts (osteotomies) are made vertically inferior, extending to the inferior border of the mandible, thereby detaching the bony segments of the mandible. The bony segments are stabilized with titanium plates; no fixation (binding of the jaw) necessary. If advancement is indicated for the chin, there are inert products available to implant onto the mandible, utilizing titanium screws, bypassing bone cuts.

=== Rapid palatal expansion osteotomy ===
When a patient has a constricted (oval shape) maxilla, but normal mandible, many orthodontists request a rapid palatal expansion. This consists of the surgeon making horizontal cuts on the lateral board of the maxilla, extending anterally to the inferior border of the nasal cavity. At this time, a chisel designed for the nasal septum is utilized to detach the maxilla from the cranial base. Then, a pterygoid chisel, which is a curved chisel, is used on the left and right side of the maxilla to detach the pterygoid palates. Care must be taken as to not injure the inferior palatine artery. Prior to the procedure, the orthodontist has an orthopedic appliance attached to the maxilla teeth, bilaterally, extending over the palate with an attachment so the surgeon may use a hex-like screw to place into the device to push from anterior to posterior to start spreading the bony segments. The expansion of the maxilla may take up to eight weeks with the surgeon advancing the expander hex lock, sideways (← →), once a week.

== Post operation ==
After orthognathic surgery, patients are often required to adhere to an all-liquid diet for a time. Weight loss due to lack of appetite and the liquid diet is common. Normal recovery time can range from a few weeks for minor surgery, to up to a year for more complicated surgery. For some surgeries, pain may be minimal due to minor nerve damage and lack of feeling. Doctors will prescribe pain medication and prophylactic antibiotics to the patient. There is often a large amount of swelling around the jaw area, and in some cases bruising. Most of the swelling will disappear in the first few weeks, but some may remain for a few months.

== Recovery ==
All dentofacial osteotomies require an initial healing time of 2–6 weeks with secondary healing (complete bony union and bone remodeling) taking an additional 2–4 months. The jaw is sometimes immobilized (movement restricted by wires or elastics) for approximately 1–4 weeks. However, the jaw will still require two to three months for proper healing. Lastly, if screws were inserted in the jaw, bone will typically grow over them during the two to three month healing period. Patients also may not drive or operate vehicles or large machinery during the consumption of painkillers, which are typically taken for six to eight days after the surgery, depending on the pain experienced. Immediately after surgery, patients must adhere to certain infection preventing instructions such as daily cleaning, and the consumption of antibiotics. Cleaning of the mouth should always be done regardless of surgery to ensure healthy, strong teeth. Patients are able to return to work 2–6 weeks after the surgery, but must follow the specific rules for recovery for ~8 weeks.

== History ==
Mandible and maxilla osteotomies date to the 1940s. They were used to correct dentofacial deformities like a malocclusion, and a prognathism. Advances have been made in the procedures, and in the anesthesia used. In 1985, mandible and maxilla osteotomies were effectively used to correct more extreme deformities like receding chins, and to relieve pain from temporomandibular joint disorder (TMJ).

Prior to 1991, some patients undergoing a dentofacial osteotomy still had third molars (wisdom teeth), and had them removed during surgery. An extensive study done by Dr. M. Lacy and Dr. R. Colcleugh, was used to identify threats of combining the two surgeries used 83 patients from the time span of 1987 and 1991. Patients were reviewed, and divided into two groups; those who had, and those who did not have their third molars extracted during the dentofacial Osteotomy. The study showed that 73% of patients developed an infection of the hardware inserted into the jaw when having their third molars removed during an osteotomy. The data indicated that getting the osteotomy and the third molar extraction at the same time highly increases the chances of infection development.

Advances in the surgical techniques allow surgeons to perform the surgery under local anesthesia with assistance from intravenous sedation. Dr. Raffaini introduced this technique in 2002 after a four-year study done with local anesthesia and assistance from intravenous sedation. Prior to this, surgeons would fully sedate patients, hospitalizing them shortly after the surgery for a 2–3 day recovery, specifically from the anesthesia. Advancements allow surgeons to expand the use of an osteotomy on more parts of the jaws with faster recovery time, less pain, and no hospitalization, making the surgery more effective with respect to time and recovery. The procedure, which is strictly used for a mandibular (jaw) deformity and mobilization, has advanced from similar, very effective procedures performed since 1985. The original mandible and maxilla osteotomy procedure still remains almost unchanged, as it is the simplest and still the most effective for dentofacial deformity correction.

== See also ==
- Oral and maxillofacial surgery
- Dental braces
- Oral and maxillofacial pathology
- Le Fort osteotomy
