= Cosmetic surgery in South Korea =

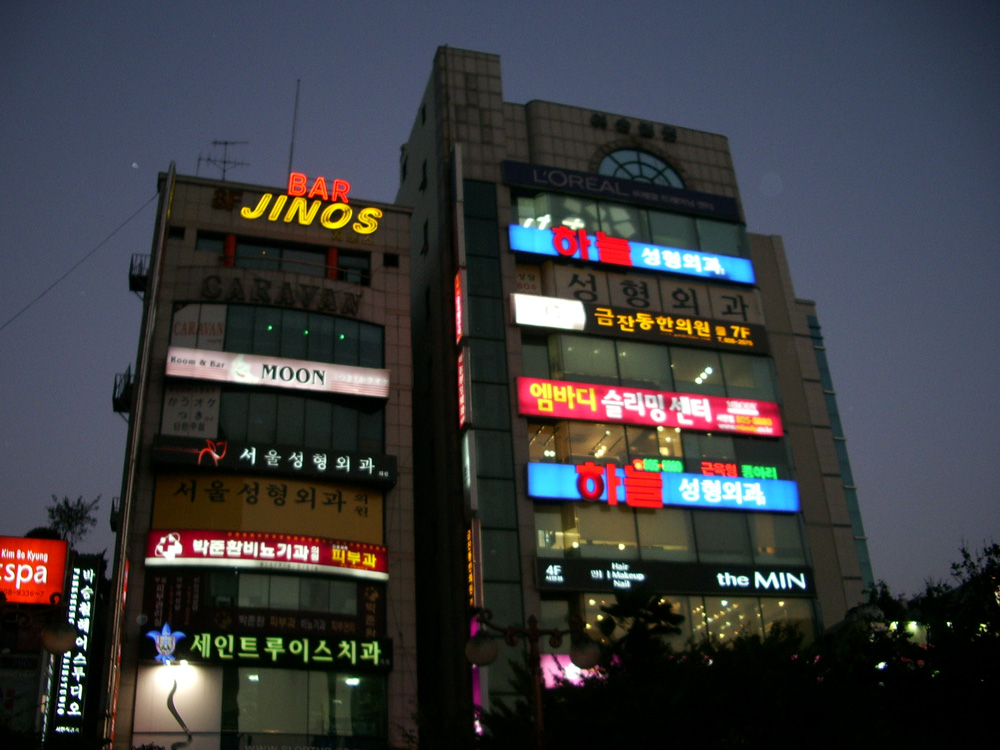
A building in Busan, housing several cosmetic surgery clinics.

As of 2021, South Korea had the highest number of voluntary or elective surgery performed for beauty enhancement per capita in the world according to data from the International Society of Aesthetic Plastic Surgery (ISAPS).

== History ==
The modern Korean interest in physical appearance dates back to the 7th century, finding its roots in physiognomy (gwansang), the belief that one's facial features reveal their personality and destiny. The concept of connecting identity and appearance became stronger during the Japanese colonial period in Korea, as Japanese rulers promoted the idea that certain facial features displayed greater intelligence and nobility. Subsequently, plastic surgery techniques were introduced by American doctors during the Korean War, which contributed to the acceptance of the Western notion that changing one's face could change one's destiny.

Following the 1997 Asian financial crisis, South Korea's labor market was deregulated, leading citizens to seek every possible edge over competitors for a job position, including cosmetic surgery. This trend persists today with many companies requiring a photo, height, and sometimes family background information as a part of the hiring process.

In South Korean society, the motivations for undergoing these procedures are a subject of debate. Holliday and Elfving-Hwang suggest that the pressure to succeed in work and marriage is deeply rooted in an individual's ability to manage their physical appearance, which is influenced by societal beauty standards. Because marriage matchmaking services and job applications often require a headshot, many Koreans feel pressure to undergo plastic surgery to achieve a look often referred to as "natural beauty".

== Statistics ==
Over the past few decades, plastic surgery has become more accepted in South Korea. For instance, while only 38% of respondents in 1994 felt that it was acceptable for a woman to undergo plastic surgery for marriage, that figure rose to 66% by 2015. During the same period, the proportion of women reporting they had undergone surgery rose from 5% to 31%. Women consistently report higher rates of procedures and express more support for them than men.

According to a 2020 Statista survey of 1,500 people, plastic surgery is especially prevalent among young adults. Nearly 25% of women aged 19–29 have undergone procedures, compared to just 2% of men. Among those aged 30–39, these figures rise to 31% for women and 4% for men. However, a case study by Allure noted a shifting trend, reporting that men have recently accounted for as much as 30% of certain plastic surgery cases. This expectation to undergo cosmetic procedures is not restricted to urban areas and has spread to rural towns, in part due to the popularity of K-pop idols such as Wonder Girls and Girls' Generation.

Frequently called the "plastic surgery capital of the world", South Korea treats cosmetic surgery as a commonplace occurrence, to the extent that it has become a frequent graduation gift. The country is a global market leader, capturing a 25% share of the international industry. One in five Korean women have undergone plastic surgery, compared to one in twenty in the United States. The industry also continues to attract international interest. In 2018, 464,452 medical tourists visited South Korea for cosmetic surgery, a 16.7% increase from 2017.

== Market ==
In the Korean surgery market, there are two providers: Hospitals and Specialty Clinics and Spas and Cosmetic Surgery Centers. In 2021, the market was valued to 1.95 billion US dollars.

=== Forms of cosmetic surgery ===
==== Blepharoplasty ====
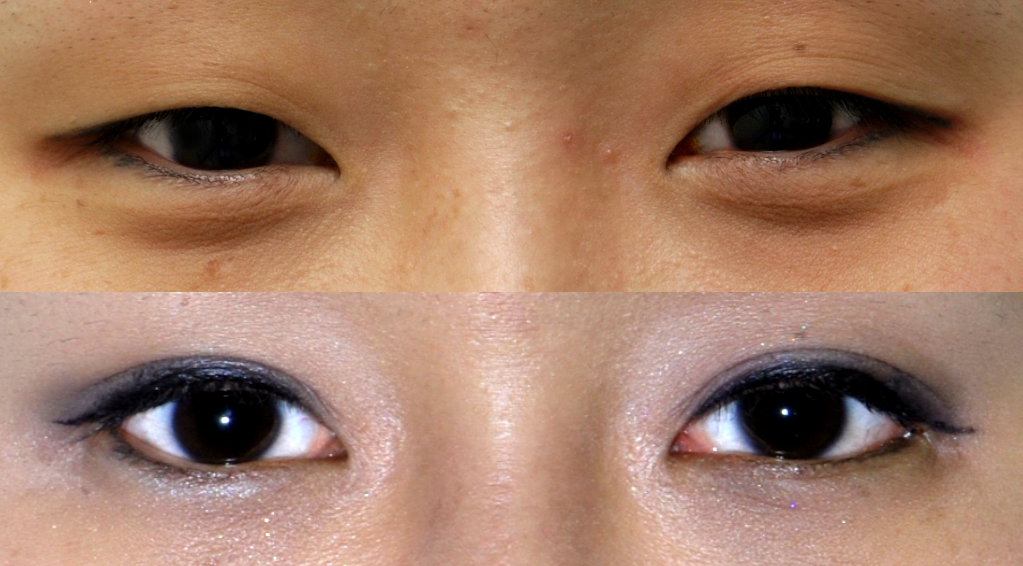
A before and after comparison of a double eyelid surgery.

This form of cosmetic surgery is also known as the "double eyelid surgery". It is a surgery that reshapes the skin around the eye, resulting in a crease on the upper eyelid. The procedure is popular not just in South Korea but also other Asian countries like Taiwan and India.

The double eyelid surgery can be done in several ways, with the main difference being the form of incision. The full incision is often done to patients with excess fat and skin in the upper eyelid, a partial incision is done when there is only excess fat in the eyelid, while there is no incision used when there is no excess fat and skin. The surgery is not considered painful and it can take up to 4 weeks to fully recover.

==== Facial contouring ====
Asian facial skeletal contouring surgeries, also known as V-Line surgeries, are often done to reduce the dimension or angularity of the cheekbones or the jaw in order to create a V shape. They are commonly found among young Korean pop stars and can give the face an elf- or childlike appeal. K-pop groups like created a trend for the V-shaped face among young girls, as it is seen as an attractive feature.

A surgery can involve several related procedures: zygomatic reduction, V-Line surgery, mandibular contouring, and sagittal osteotomy of mandible. Zygomatic reduction involves fracturing the zygomatic arch, reshaping and re-orienting the bone so that it protrudes less to the side. During a V-Line surgery, incisions are made through the mouth. The chin is then fractured and reduced, and the jaw bone is shaved. Mandibular contouring is similar but does not involve the chin. Sagittal osteotomy reduces the width of the jaw bone.

The pain following surgery ranges from mild to extreme. The jaws may be wired together for weeks, and it can take six months for the swelling to completely disappear, although it is most significant during the first 72 hours. A maxillofacial surgeon and former professor at Columbia University said the V-Line surgery is complex and carries risks of permanent numbness and death.

==== Rhinoplasty ====
The surgery can be performed open and closed. The open procedure is the most popular as it gives the surgeon more visual context. It requires an incision in the columella, which often heals without any issues and leaves a minor scar that should be difficult to spot. Once the procedure is done, it takes a few weeks to heal completely. In a closed surgery, all the incisions are made inside of the nose.

In South Korea, rhinoplasty is the most common surgery among ethnic Koreans. The procedure is sometimes be performed in a health context as well, as restructuring the nose can also make it easier to breathe.

K-pop idols may undergo rhinoplasties. For example, Hyoyeon, a member of South Korean girl group Girls' Generation, has been rumoured to have undergone rhinoplasty and other procedures during her time as an idol.

==== Face whitening ====
The active ingredient in face whitening is glutathione. The procedure lasts 20 minutes. Negative side-effects of face whitening procedures include low blood pressure, whole-body rash, and digestive issues such as nausea or vomiting.

=== Medical tourism ===
Medical tourism is the act of attracting foreigners to undergo surgeries. With the rise of popularity of K-drama and K-pop around the world, numerous people opted South Korea to undergo cosmetic surgeries. "South Korea's plastic surgery business is gaining popularity because of the country's quick, affordable, efficient, safe, and high-quality healthcare system." In 2019, a total of 211,218 tourists visited South Korea for plastic surgery.

== Controversy ==
=== Ghost surgeries ===
A ghost surgery is a surgery in which the person who performs the operation, the "ghost doctor," is not the surgeon that was hired for and is credited with the operation. The ghost doctor substitutes the hired surgeon while the patient is unconscious from anesthesia.

Ghost surgeries are "rampant" in the South Korean cosmetic surgery industry. Ghost doctors are often unlicensed and unqualified to perform the operations they are hired for, with some plastic surgeries being performed by dentists, nurses, or salespeople; one former ghost doctor reported that most substitutes were dentists. The Korean Society of Plastic Surgeons estimated that there were about 100,000 victims of ghost surgery in South Korea between 2008 and 2014. About five patients died during ghost surgeries between 2014 and 2022.

Ghost surgery is illegal in South Korea, but as there is often no evidence a surgery was performed by a ghost doctor, it is rarely punished in court. Public backlash to ghost surgery has led to the mandating of security cameras in operating rooms in South Korea.

=== Beauty standards ===
South Korea is criticised for having unrealistic beauty standards, often expecting women to be very thin to the point where their weight can become unhealthy. The "escape the corset" movement goes directly against the country's beauty standards which actively promote time consuming skin care regimens and surgery. The movement is intended to create body positivity and reduce the strict standards that women have to live up to in the country.

A study conducted by Young A. Kim, Duckhee Chae, and Hyunlye Kim titled "Factors Affecting Acceptance of Cosmetic Surgery Among Undergraduate Students" affirms that beauty standards conveyed by television, the internet, actors, and K-pop stars negatively affect mental health by decreasing self-esteem and increasing anxiety. The socio-cultural messages transmitted by peers reflect how these high beauty standards have become the norm.

Let Me In was a controversial South Korean television show focused on complete make-overs, including plastic surgery. Participants had to convince a panel that their appearance made their lives difficult. The show even went so far as having parents apologise for their child's appearance and their own inability to provide plastic surgery. After their procedures, participants were presented to a live audience. The show was shut down in 2015 following significant controversy and criticism that it promoted plastic surgery as overly attractive to its viewers.

A 2021 study found a correlation between negative body image or evaluation and acceptance of plastic surgery among South Korean college students.

=== Employment surgery ===
Employment surgery is a common occurrence in South Korea. Due to a competitive job market, appearance is considered an important factor when hiring, which pressures candidates into undergoing surgery to gain an edge over their competitors. Statistically, applicants perceived as more attractive are more likely to be hired than those who do not conform to beauty standards. This can negatively impact the mental health of qualified job seekers who feel they do not satisfy these aesthetic expectations. According to a 2006 survey, 92.2% of South Korean women expect to face appearance-based discrimination during job interviews.

In 2021, a bill was proposed that would take action against this culture, banning companies from asking for photos on résumés. A survey in 2006 showed that 80% of public companies require personal information like photos.

== See also ==
- Cosmetics in Korea
- Cosmetic surgery in Australia
- Cosmetic surgery in China
- Healthcare in South Korea
- Korean beauty standards
- Medical tourism in South Korea
