= South Korean beauty standards =

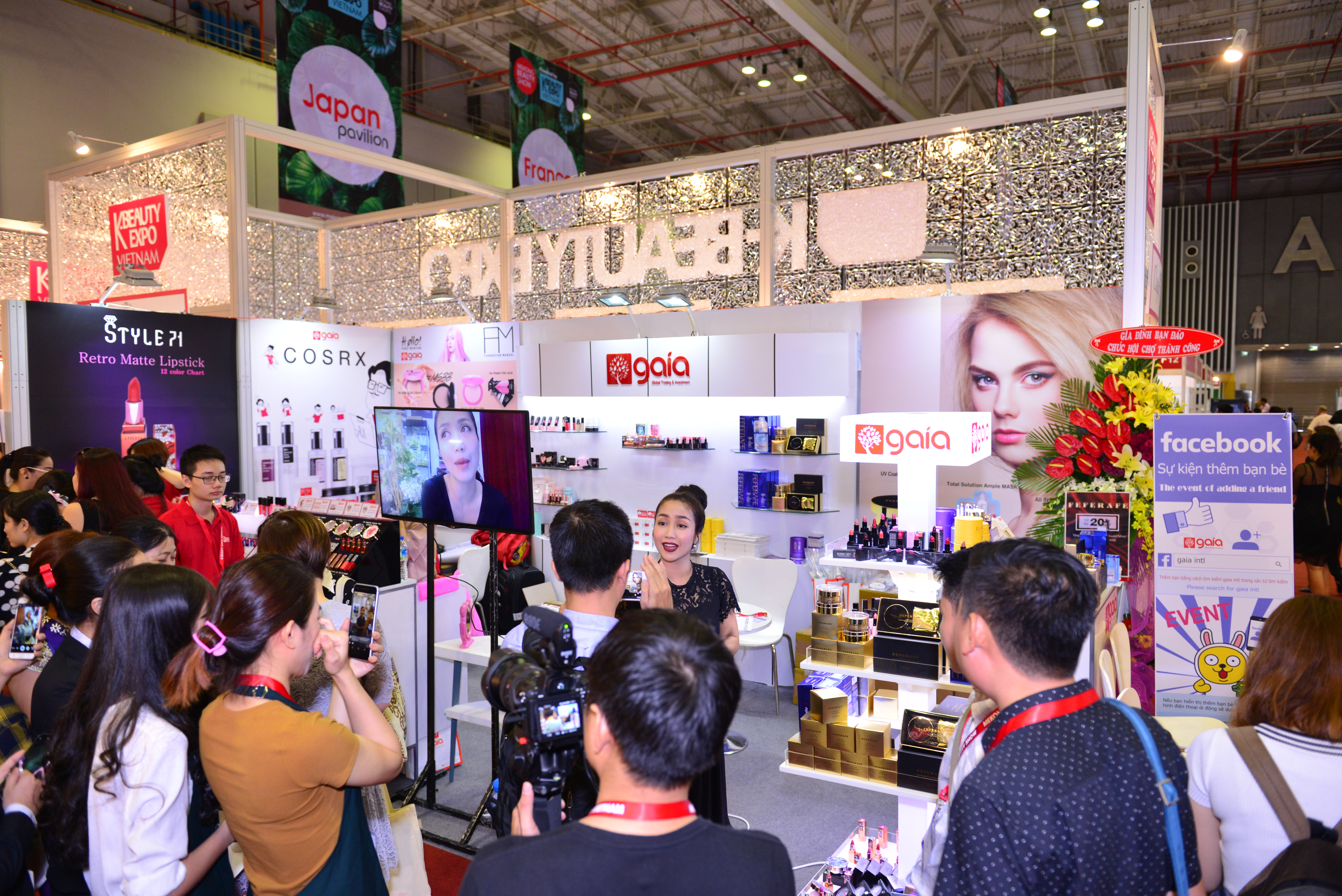
A Korean beauty expo

South Korean beauty standards prioritize maintaining a youthful appearance rather than looking mature. A combination of clear skin, an even skin complexion, a slim, V-shaped jawline, and pronounced puffy aegyo-sal (fatty, bag-like deposits under the eye—common in children; rare in adults) contributes to a desirable youthful aesthetic and personal presentation. Beauty is often associated with social and economic success in South Korea, particularly in areas such as employment.

The increased influence of South Korean media, such as K-pop, Korean dramas, and advertisements throughout South Korea presents this softer appearance to the public as the desirable norm. Even among men, this softer, more androgynous appearance is preferred in romantic interests and is more evident in the media than among men with traditionally masculine features.

In 2015, a global survey by the International Society of Aesthetic Plastic Surgeons placed South Korea in the top ten of countries who had the highest rate of cosmetic surgeries. South Korea has been described in international media as a "plastic surgery nation", although scholars argue that this idea has been shaped by media narratives and may oversimplify the reality of the industry.

== Cultural pressure ==
A study from 2008 determined that 20 percent of young South Korean girls have undergone cosmetic surgery. This is significantly above the average rate in other countries. A 2015 survey from Gallup Korea determined that approximately one-third of South Korean women between ages 19 and 29 had claimed to have had plastic surgery. (Note: In this survey, "experience of plastic surgery" was defined entirely by respondents' own judgment, regardless of type or frequency, because the goal was to gauge perceptions rather than document precise practices. Non-incisional methods that don't involve a scalpel, such as laser treatments, Botox injections, or mole removal, are often called "procedures," while incisional methods are called "surgeries," so some respondents may not have reported experiences with "procedures.")

In South Korea, immense societal pressure to conform to the community and societal expectations are placed on the individual. This is evident in the theorization of the factors that influence both South Korean men and women to adhere to a strict beauty standard. A study by Lin and Raval from Miami University shows that the pressure for the "perfect" appearance may stem from feelings of inferiority if they perceive themselves as less attractive within their community. The result from this particular study supports the previous evidence from Keong Ja Woo, who analyzed how beauty standards in South Korea, regarding one's height, weight, and facial preference, impacted their chances of employment. K-pop idols play and important role in shaping beauty standards in South Korea, often presenting idealized features such as slim bodies, fair skin, and specific facial characteristics. Exposure to these images can influence body image, particularly among adolescent girls, and increase pressure to meet similar standards.

The pressure to uphold a standard of beauty is felt even in the job market. Physical appearance is considered an important factor in hiring and employment opportunities in South Korea. Companies require a photo, height, and sometimes the family background of applicants as a part of the hiring process. Beauty is often seen as a means for socioeconomic success in the rapidly modernized post-war economy of South Korea, which has seen a sluggish job growth rate after its economic boom. Women in particular face greater pressure to conform to beauty standards due to gender expectations within society. This has left South Korea with a highly skilled and educated workforce competing for a short supply of job opportunities and chances for upward social mobility. This competitive job market can increase pressures on individuals to meet appearance standards in order to stand out. Some South Koreans view investments in beauty, such as cosmetic products and medical beauty treatments, such as plastic surgery, dermatology, and cosmetic dentistry, as a means of cultural capital to get an edge over peers for social and economic advancement.

Western beauty ideals have influenced the development of modern beauty standards in South Korea, particularly through globalization and media. The theorization of the impact of Western beauty standards on South Korean society is highly controversial. Some Western authors attribute modern South Korean beauty standards to Western influence, while others point out that Caucasian features are in many cases considered unattractive by South Korean beauty standards, and that South Korean beauty standards portray a traditional ethnic "look" that is seen in pre-colonial Korean art. Western media and advertising have also played a role in shaping beauty standards in South Korea, where the frequent use of Caucasian models in advertisements can reinforce certain appearance ideals. Some studies have reported a higher incidence of body dissatisfaction among South Korean boys and girls than among boys and girls living in the United States, while noting that these studies fail to control for the slimmer and smaller size of South Koreans as compared with Westerners.

In addition, Jung and Lee observed that more models conformed to thin beauty ideals in South Korean magazines than in U.S. magazines. Higher cultural pressure to conform to thin body ideals in South Korea may be responsible for the higher rate of body dysmorphia and eating disorders among Korean men and women.

Since South Korea has seen a more than 20-fold increase in real per capita income and is currently ranked among the top 20 economies in the world, there has been a parallel increase in visibility for women's rights. However, with this growth in visibility and social change for women, Kim et al. argued that it was "immediately accompanied by increases in body dissatisfaction and eating disorders".

Other cultural factors, such as the hardened Confucianism in Korean society, have been quoted as prominent factors. The philosophy of Confucius highly influenced the gender roles and norms in Korea, and some of his teachings have been sustained even through modern Korea. Jung et al. argued that the emphasis on gender roles, with women being submissive and men being dominant, caused a patriarchal society from these philosophical teachings, which may have had an impact on the beauty standard.

Women are more likely to examine and make changes to their bodies and faces in order to adhere to the beauty standards projected by the objectification theory that views women as "objects". Lin et al. argued that impractical beauty standards could be caused by highly patriarchal societies that only promote unbending gender roles, which are then reflected by the influence of Confucianism in South Korean history. Lin et al. also argued that another cultural factor such as certain facial features leading to bad luck may incentivize plastic surgery.

== Cosmetics ==
In 2023, South Korea's cosmetic industry was valued at over five trillion South Korean won. In 2015, South Korea exported $2.64 billion of cosmetic goods, $730 million more than in 2014. As of December 2023, South Korea was the 3rd-largest exporter of beauty products and cosmetic goods.

Some of the most popular products used in South Korean beauty are blemish balm (BB) creams, color correction (CC) creams, serums, essences, ampoules, seaweed face masks, and scrubs.

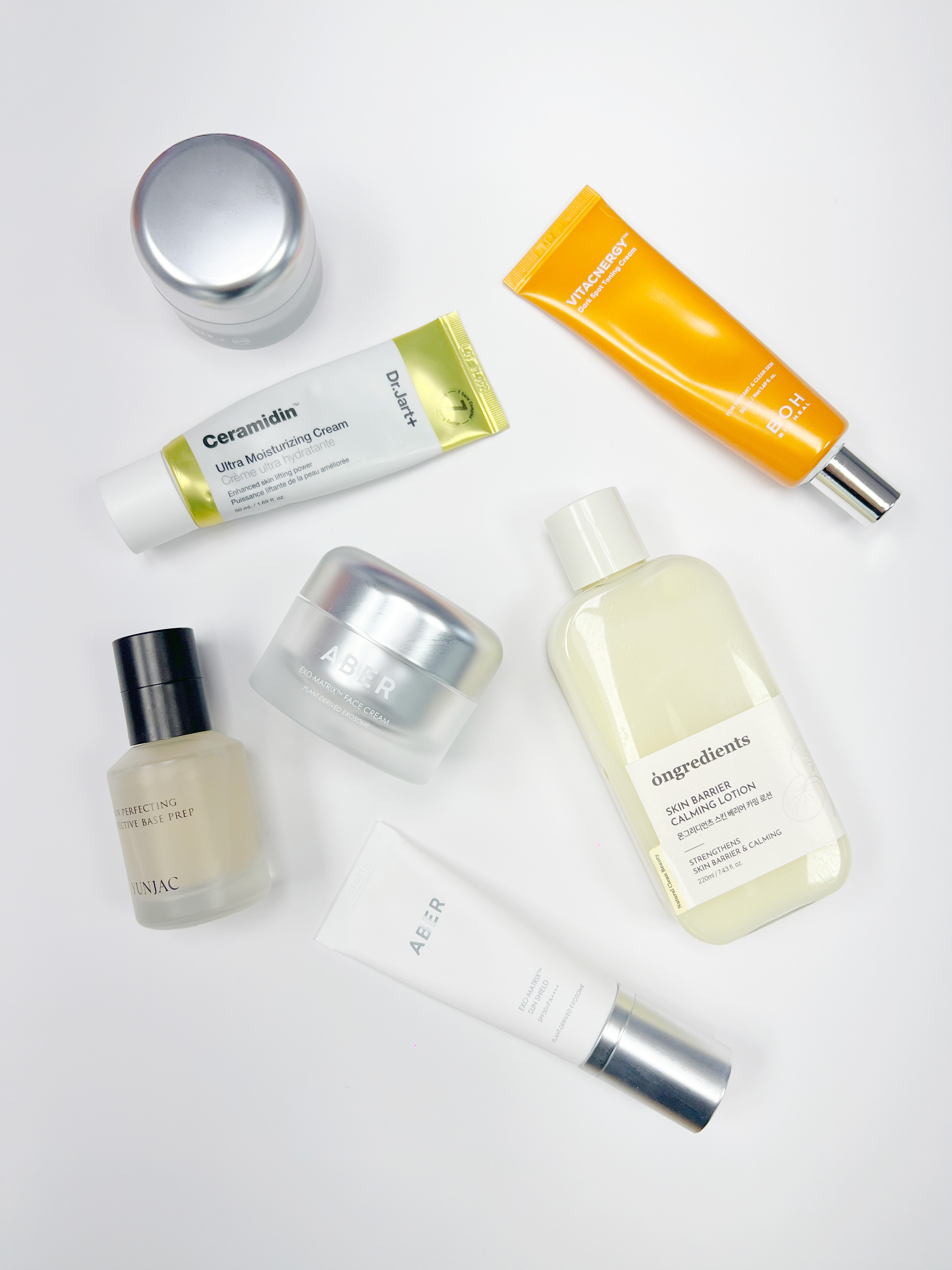
A selection of South Korean skincare and cosmetic products representing the diversity of the country's beauty industry.

South Korean beauty products contain ingredients not commonly found in Western products, such as snail extract. In 2011, BB cream, previously available only in China, hit the shelves in America, and by 2014, the US market for BB cream was around $164 million.

The ideal for South Korean women is to have "dewy" skin, meaning smooth, hydrated, clear, resilient, and shiny. Chokchok refers to skin that is bouncy and moist; taeng-taeng describes skin that is firm and smooth. The dewy skincare routines are quite different from the Western concept of using makeup to conceal flaws. While Western makeup uses facial contouring to try to change the appearance of one's facial bone structure, South Korean dewy makeup seeks to enhance the skin's appearance, creating a "natural" look.

== Plastic surgery ==
South Korea is often called "plastic surgery capital of the world" due in part to its status as an affordable destination for Chinese, Russian and American cosmetic tourists. However, a large number of countries in the Western Hemisphere have also been dubbed the "plastic surgery capital of the world". Plastic surgery in South Korea is not as stigmatized as in the west and is even a common graduation gift. The most common plastic surgery among South Koreans is double eyelid surgery and wrinkle removal surgery, whereas Caucasians in Korea tended to get their noses reduced in size, followed by eye surgery.

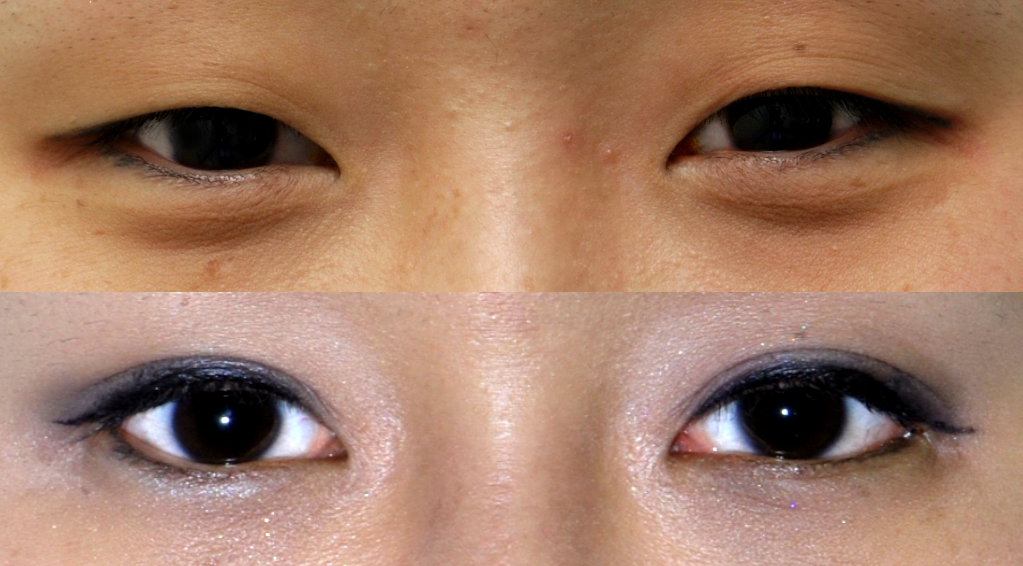
Example of Korean double-eyelid surgery

The appeal of common cosmetic procedures among South Koreans are sometimes attributed to Western influence, however many authors reject this view and suggest that they represent the pursuit of a distinctly Korean ethnic "look". V-line surgery (jaw and chin reduction) and cheekbone (zygoma) reduction surgeries are used to change the facial contour. These surgeries are especially common amongst celebrities, who are often required to undergo changes in their cheekbones, jaw, and chin, with the ultimate goal of creating an oval face. Some foreigners of Western origin have sought plastic surgery in South Korea to look like South Korean celebrities.

Motivation for plastic surgery has been debated throughout South Korean society. Holliday and Elfving-Hwang suggest that the pressure of success in work and marriage is deeply rooted in one's ability to manage their body, which is influenced by beauty. As companies helping with matchmaking for marriage and even job applications require a photo of the individual, the South Korean population inevitably feels pressure to undergo plastic surgery to achieve the "natural beauty".

South Korea has also seen an increase in medical tourism from people who seek surgical expertise in facial bone contouring. South Korean surgeons have advanced facial bone contouring with procedures like the osteotomy technique and have published the first book on facial bone contouring surgeries. There was a 17 percent increase in the sales of cosmetic surgery from 1999 to 2000, reaching almost ₩170 billion (South Korean won) which is $144 million US dollars.

The group that receives the most plastic surgery in South Korea is idol trainees, and there is a culture in which entertainment agencies force plastic surgery regardless of their will. As a result of hearing opinions from plastic surgeons in downtown Seoul, the answer came out, "90% of idol singers and trainees appearing on TV seem to have had plastic surgery." Won-jun Yoon, director of Migo Plastic Surgery Clinic, said, "Now, plastic surgery has become an essential course that teenagers who dream of becoming celebrities must go through before their debut. The most common surgeries they receive are facial contouring and fat removal. Director Bae Jun-seong of JK Plastic Surgery said, "For the face, there are many cases of receiving a discount on the eyes, nose, and facial contouring surgery as a set."

=== History ===
Ralph Millard, who graduated from Yale College and Harvard Medical School, had been employed by the U.S. Marine Corps as the chief plastic surgeon in South Korea. Desiring a similar path to his mentor, Sir Harold Gillies, he wanted to provide reconstructive plastic surgery for wounded soldiers, children, and other civilians who were injured by the Korean War. Millard was exploring ways to perform reconstructive surgeries on burn victims to restore eyebrows, an unusual interest that led him to study the eye, the eye socket, and the eyelid fold.

He wanted to modify the structure of the "oriental" eye into a more "western" look. Millard was unable to find a consenting patient until a Korean translator requested undergo the operation for eyes that had a more "round appearance", stating that the "because of the squint in his slant eyes, Americans could not tell what he was thinking and consequently did not trust him" in which Millard agreed with his sentiment.

Although double-eyelid surgery had already been performed in small numbers in Japan, Hong Kong, and South Korea, Millard's incorporation changed the motivation and techniques of plastic surgery in South Korea. Millard stated he wanted to reduce the "Asian-ness" by making a higher nose bridge by implanting more cartilage to the nose and widening the eyes by tearing the inner fold of the eye for a look of a longer eye, removed the fat in the eyelid that causes the monolid, and sutured the skin on the eyelid to create the double-eyelid fold.

== Break the corset movement ==
In 2015, participants in the feminist movement Megalia began to use the word "corset" as a metonym for the restraints women place on themselves in order to conform to the expectations of a male-centered society, especially expectations about physical appearance. Having to deal with societal oppression was compared to being bound up in a corset. South Korean women took to social media in a backlash against unrealistic beauty standards that require them to spend hours applying makeup and performing extensive skincare regimes, which often involve ten steps or more. After the #MeToo movement, when women shared their sexual assault and harassment stories, this became known as the "break (or free) the corset" movement. Some South Korean women have destroyed their makeup, cut their hair, and rejected the pressures of getting surgery. The purpose of the movement is to create space for South Korean women to feel comfortable with themselves and not have social pressures limit their identity. Critics argue that by criticizing women who still apply makeup, supporters of the movement are just imposing more constraints on women's freedom of choice.

== Male beauty standards ==
It is very common for South Korean men to care about clear, smooth and fair skin. It is also common to dye and style hair regularly. The body shape is expected to appear rather androgynous than too muscular, appearing 'boyish' at times. Men wear sharply stylish cut outfits, and double eyelids are very common as a result of cosmetic surgery. South Korean men often choose surgery to achieve a higher nose and smaller, slimmer facial features.

"Over the past decade South Korean men have become the world's biggest male spenders on skincare and beauty products." Between 2011 and 2017, the market grew by 44%. In 2015, South Korean cosmetics brand Innisfree released a line of war paints for serving soldiers that contained added skincare benefits.

== See also ==
- Tattooing in South Korea
- Women in South Korea
