= Ghost surgery =

Surgery nonconsensually performed by a substitute surgeon

A ghost surgery is a surgery in which the person who performs the operation, the "ghost surgeon" or "ghost doctor", is not the surgeon that was hired for and is credited with the operation. The term "ghost doctor" can be interchangeably used with the term "shadow doctor" in South Korea. The ghost doctor substitutes the hired surgeon while the patient is unconscious from anesthesia. Ghost doctors are often unlicensed and unqualified to perform the operations they are hired for. Ghost surgery is widely considered to be unethical.

Today, ghost surgery is particularly common in the South Korean cosmetic surgery industry, in which it is "rampant."

== History ==
The term "ghost surgery" was originally used to refer to qualified surgeons performing operations in the place of the unqualified physicians credited with the operation. By the late 1970s, following multiple highly publicized cases of medical equipment salesmen participating in surgery, it came to refer to multiple kinds of scenarios in which one individual substitutes the officially credited surgeon in an operation.

The Lifflander Report, a 1978 investigation commissioned by Speaker of the State Assembly of New York Stanley Steingut, found that 50-95% of surgeries in teaching hospitals were performed by residents under supervision, rather than by the lead surgeon. The report concluded that this generally does not decrease the quality of care, and is necessary for medical students to gain experience. However, patients typically do not understand and are not properly notified of the extent to which persons besides the lead surgeon will participate in the surgery.

Ghost surgery has continued as a practice into the present day; most reports of ghost surgery in the United States involve associates or residents performing operations to a greater extent than the patient consented to.

In South Korea, ghost surgery boomed in the 2010s with the increase in demand for plastic surgery, following the government's promotion of medical tourism. Ghost surgeries allow surgeons to double-book operations and otherwise maximize the number of patients they accept. Reports of ghost surgery in South Korea often involve dentists, nurses, or salespeople. One former ghost doctor reported that most substitutes were dentists.

== Prevalence ==
As ghost surgeries are untracked, it is unclear how common they are. Patients typically discover a ghost surgery took place after undergoing an unsuccessful operation.

Hospital records from Parkland Hospital in 2007-2008 showed that there were 161 surgeries in which residents operated for some time without supervision. Of these surgeries, 18% of the time the surgeon was not present for any part of the operation. Overall, across these surgeries, the surgeon was absent from 83% of the total operating time.

Ghost surgeries are "rampant" in the South Korean cosmetic surgery industry today, and are increasingly common nationwide in other areas such as spinal surgeries. The Korean Society of Plastic Surgeons estimated that there were about 100,000 victims of ghost surgery in South Korea between 2008 and 2014. About five patients died during ghost surgeries in South Korea between 2014 and 2022.

== High profile cases ==
=== Franklin Mirando ===
In 1975, William MacKay, the general sales manager of a prosthetics company, participated in the bone surgery of Franklin Mirando at the request of the lead surgeons, David Lipton and Harold Massoff. MacKay had never gone to high school and had no medical training, but was interested in surgery; by the time of Mirando's operation, he had been frequently involved in surgical procedures, especially in those where prosthetics his company sold were involved.

MacKay was present for Mirando's operation while his hip was replaced, using equipment from his company. Feeling that his advice was being ignored by Lipton and Massoff, he left to go golfing, but was called back to the operating room by Lipton and Massoff when it was discovered the implant had come loose. MacKay spent three and a half hours operating. It was later found that medical records had been manipulated to remove evidence of MacKay's participation in the operation.

Mirando, who had been permanently crippled by the 10-hour operation, filed a $2 million malpractice suit against Lipton, Massoff, and Smithtown General Hospital; the case was settled out of court for $1 million in 1980. He stated that he was unaware of MacKay's involvement when suing and that he filed the suit because the surgery had only worsened his condition.

Lipton and Massoff were indicted for allowing a non-licensed person to practice medicine and for manipulation of medical records, but charges were dropped in 1978, after the District Attorney spearheading the investigation was defeated for re-election.

=== Kwon Dae-hee ===
In October 2016, university student Kwon Dae-hee died from excessive bleeding after undergoing a jawline surgery partially conducted by a ghost doctor.

Kwon had been bullied in high school for his chin shape and was insecure about his appearance; he booked his cosmetic surgery after seeing an ad for Center A, a well-known cosmetic surgery clinic in Seoul at the time. His family was not aware of the surgery until Kwon's subsequent hospitalization.

After reviewing CCTV footage of the surgery, Kwon's mother found that much of the operation took place with a general doctor, rather than the hired surgeon, in charge, and portions of the operation were performed by nursing assistants with neither doctor nor surgeon present. The hired surgeon, who had been explicitly advertised as performing surgeries from start to finish, was carrying out operations on multiple patients at the same time.

After the surgery, both doctors went home. Kwon lost over 3.5 liters of blood, over three times the amount later reported by the medical staff; the unsupervised assistants had to mop the bloodied floor over a dozen times. Kwon was transferred to the hospital that night, and died seven weeks later.

Kwon's family won 430 million won in damages against the clinic in 2019. The surgeon in the case was sentenced in 2021 to three years of prison for involuntary manslaughter.

Following Kwon's death, his mother protested regularly in front of the Korea National Assembly Proceeding Hall to call for a bill, sometimes known as the "Kwon Dae-hee bill", that mandates the installation of security cameras in operating rooms. The bill was passed in August 2021, in part due to the public response to Kwon's death. The bill received objections from doctors, hospitals and medical groups, including the Korean Medical Association, claiming that the cameras in the operating rooms would undermine trust in doctors, violate patient privacy and discourage doctors from taking risks to save lives. A poll by the Anti‑Corruption and Civil Rights Commission found that 97.9% of respondents supported the bill.

== In popular culture ==
Ghost surgery was included in the plot of Squid Game.
