= Tattooing in South Korea =

History, culture and laws regarding tattoos in South Korea

Tattooing in South Korea has a long and controversial history. Since a 1992 Supreme Court ruling, South Korean law had restricted tattooing to licensed medical practitioners, as opposed to tattoo artists without medical degrees. In May 2026, the Supreme Court overturned this precedent, ruling that ordinary tattooing by non-medical practitioners does not by itself constitute unlicensed medical practice under the Medical Service Act. A September 2025 law that licenses non-medical tattooists is due to take effect in October 2027. It is not illegal to have a tattoo; only the army prohibits tattoos, and people can get tattoos after serving in the military. Attitudes towards tattoos and people who have them are often negative, particularly among the older generations of South Koreans.

== History ==
Historical texts can show that tattoos were practiced in the tribal confederacies Mahan, Jinhan and Pyŏnhan of Samhan. This tattoo practice served primarily as a type of magic charm or talisman, used by fishermen and divers in the southern part of the country to protect from sea monsters.

The significance of tattoos changed during the Goryeo Dynasty (918 to 1392) and proceeded into the Joseon Dynasty (1392–1910). Individuals who committed crimes would have tattoos describing their infractions etched into their skin over exposed areas where it could be seen by others.

During the Joseon dynasty another type of tattoo custom called yeonbi (연비; 聯臂), appeared alongside the punishment tattoo. "This practice... was a pledge of love or devotion between two (or more) people..". This type of tattoo was a symbol of loyalty displayed by marking the name of a loved one onto an individual's body. Though popular, these tattoos were illegal, and if revealed the owner would be punished by law.

During the 20th century, tattoos in Korea became customary for gangs and thus created an association of the two. This was an imitation of Japanese gang culture during Japan's colonial rule of Korea (1910-1945). This further contributed to the distaste for tattoos already present in the Confucian culture of Korea.

== Shifting cultural norms ==
The number of youth with tattoos and the number of tattooed individuals is increasing. As indicated by a study in 1983, 72.6% of individuals responded that they have not seen a person with any tattoos. In 2007, 67% of residents expressed that they have seen a tattoo. In 2014, individuals feel that they end up noticeably liberal about tattoo contrasted with the past and they anticipate that the time of inked individuals would be different and the number of inked individuals would increase.

As indicated by research in Busan, 83.1% of individuals connect tattoos to violence and punitive actions when they consider the term munsin (문신), the Korean term for 'tattoo'. Contrarily, when the English word 'tattoo' is translated as tatu (타투), it is more often contributed to fashion, trends, or beauty.

While tattoos are becoming more popular in contemporary Korean culture, particularly among the newer generations, current legal regulations hinder movement to the mainstream.

== Controversy of legalising tattoos ==
The Korean Ministry of Health and Welfare considers the act of tattooing similar to medical procedures and deemed they should therefore only be performed by a professional with a medical license. In December 2015, new vocations were advanced including occupations for tattooists. The legislature said that an update to the law regarding tattoos is essential. They arranged an exploration about the case in different nations, symptoms and legalization of tattooing.

Tattoo artists suggest the necessity of legalizing tattoo for changing an image of illegal, protecting tattooists by law and registration of entrepreneur. The awareness of tattoo is changing around the world; still, it is illegal in Korea. Tattooist iIda said "I can not hang up a sign for my shop because it is illegal, making laws about the tattoo is necessary."

"While the tattoo restriction law is currently still pending, South Korean tattoo artists are strongly forced to resort to social media and other internet platforms in order to promote their business, since it is too risky to display their shops and advertisement openly in the streets. South Korean tattoo artists have been able to gradually build and develop their own tattoo culture by means of social media and create their own unique tattoo styles and establish a tattoo community over the past decade." The Korean government estimates that approximately 20 thousand tattoo artists are operating in illegal tattoo parlors in Seoul.

== Semi-permanent tattoos ==
As the number of working women jumped dramatically, new cosmetic techniques appeared. Semi-permanent makeup provides women all around the world with convenience and efficiency. It also offers confidence and feelings of relaxation. In fact, many social commerce sites are providing various incentives such as offering coupons to increase its popularity.

Semi-permanent make up is a cosmetic technique that applies tattoo pigment onto the dermis for a certain amount of time. Compared to a permanent tattoo, it is a cosmetic technique preferred by many people because of safety and durability.

According to Korean Agency in 2016, the problematic side effects from semi-permanent tattooing, as reported in CISS (Consumer Injury Surveillance System), numbered 77 cases in the last three years. The Ministry of Agriculture conducted tests on 25 tattoo inks to determine the amount of toxicity; 12 products were declared improper and dangerous because they possessed cadmium exceeding the accepted level. Six products contained levels of lead, a known neurotoxin, over 5.5 times the accepted level. Zinc, copper, and nickel are components that may cause atopic dermatitis if people are exposed to those ingredients for a long time.

== Legalization ==
On September 25, 2025 a bill was passed legalizing tattooing by non-medical professionals after over 30 years with a total of 195 out of 202 votes in favor of the act. This legalization follows the promise that Mr. Lee had made within his presidential campaign regarding the legalization of tattooing by non-medical professionals back in 2022 after Mr. Yoon was impeached in 2024. This bill, formally known as The Tattooist Act, permits those who are non-medical professionals to tattoo, though they must follow set guidelines and will be able to do so within the provided two-year grace period that allows artists to obtain the required licenses and trainings established in the act. Among these requirements are passing a national exam in order to obtain a government-approved license, finishing training and compliance with safety and hygiene standards, license management, as well as continuous official documentation. This new law, however, does not permit the removal of tattoos, as that is still only reserved for medical professionals. The law will be enacted on October 28, 2027 and outlines the requirements that licensed artists must follow such as following safety and hygiene standards with annual health check-ups, explanation and record of potential side effects, and consent from guardians for minors.

=== Supreme Court ruling (2026) ===
On 21 May 2026, the Supreme Court, sitting en banc, overturned its 1992 precedent, holding that ordinary lettering, pictorial and cosmetic tattooing by non-medical practitioners does not by itself constitute unlicensed medical practice under the Medical Service Act. The court reasoned that such tattooing is largely unrelated to the treatment of disease and does not require expertise comparable to that of licensed medical practitioners.

== See also ==
- Korean beauty standards
