= Serdev suture =

Scarless Serdev Suture suspension liftings use percutaneous skeletal fixation of movable fascias without incisions. In Brazil known as fio elastico., are used to correct early ptosis and flabbiness in areas of face and body. The suture suspension techniques are described to lift, if necessary to form volume and to correct position of soft tissue without traditional incisions.

The techniques consist of passing closed sutures, by needle perforations only, to lift movable fascias and fix them to non movable skeletal structures in several facial and body areas:

In face areas: total ambulatory SMAS Lift, temporal and supra-temporal suture SMAS lift, scarless brow suture lift, lateral cantus lifting, mid face suture lift, cheekbone lift and augmentation, lower smas-platysma face and neck lift using skin perforations only or by using hidden retro-lobular incisions, chin enhancement, form and position correction by suture, Serdev sutures for: nasal tip refinement; nasal tip rotation; nasal alar base narrowing, scarless Serdev suture method in prominent ears, chin dimples and smiling dimples by suture, permanent block of glabella muscles etc.

In body areas: scarless breast lift by suture and needle perforations only, scarless buttock lift by suture, abdominal flaccidity tightening by sutures, scarless inner thigh lift.
