= Johann Friedrich Dieffenbach =

German surgeon specialized in skin transplantation and plastic surgery

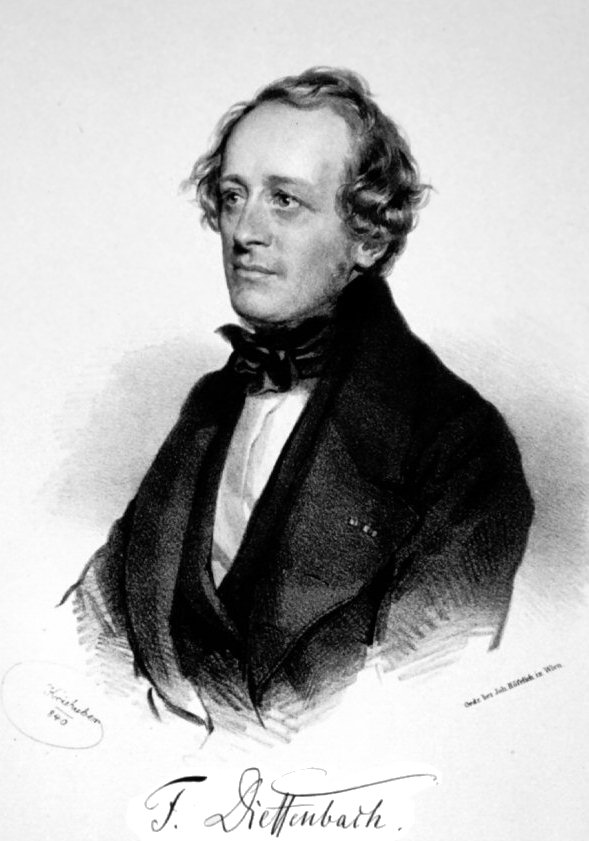
- Johann Friedrich Dieffrenbach, 1840
- Born: 1 February 1792; Königsberg, Prussia (now Kaliningrad, Russia)
- Died: 11 November 1847 (aged 55); Berlin, Germany
- Occupation: Surgeon

Johann Friedrich Dieffenbach (1 February 1792 – 11 November 1847) was a German surgeon. He was born in Königsberg and died in Berlin.

Dieffenbach specialized in skin transplantation and plastic surgery. His work in rhinoplastic and maxillofacial surgery established many modern techniques of reconstructive surgery. His endeavours comprehended subcutaneous operations such as tenotomy, the surgical division of a tendon. Before the discovery of blood typing and blood matching, Dr. Dieffenbach researched blood transfusion, about which he published Die Transfusion des Blutes und die Infusion der Arzneien in die Blutgefässe (1828). In 1839, Dieffenbach performed the first successful myotomy for the treatment of strabismus on a seven-year-old boy with esotropia.

Originally, the student J.F. Dieffenbach studied theology at the universities at Rostock and Greifswald. From 1813 to 1815, he volunteered as a soldier in the Befreiungskriege (Napoleonic Wars) as a Jäger. From 1816 to 1820 he studied medicine at the University of Königsberg, then relocated to Bonn as an assistant to Philipp Franz von Walther. Following visits to Paris and Montpellier, he received his doctorate at the University of Würzburg in 1822. Afterwards, he settled in Berlin, where he focused his attention on plastic and reconstructive surgery. In 1824, he married Johanna Motherby. In 1832, he became an associate professor at the university of Berlin, and in 1840 became director of the Clinical Institute for Surgery at Charité Hospital. After his death in 1847, Bernhard von Langenbeck (1810–1887) replaced Dieffenbach as director of surgery.

Dieffenbach has been called "father of plastic surgery".

== Dieffenbach Medal (Dieffenbach-Medaille) ==
Awarded by the Deutsche Gesellschaft für Plastische, Rekonstruktive und Ästhetische Chirurgie e. V. (Association of German Plastic Surgeons), the Dieffenbach Medal was created by artist Fritz Becker. It was awarded for the first time in 1989 during the 20th annual meeting.
