= Plastic surgery =

Medical surgical specialty

Plastic surgeon
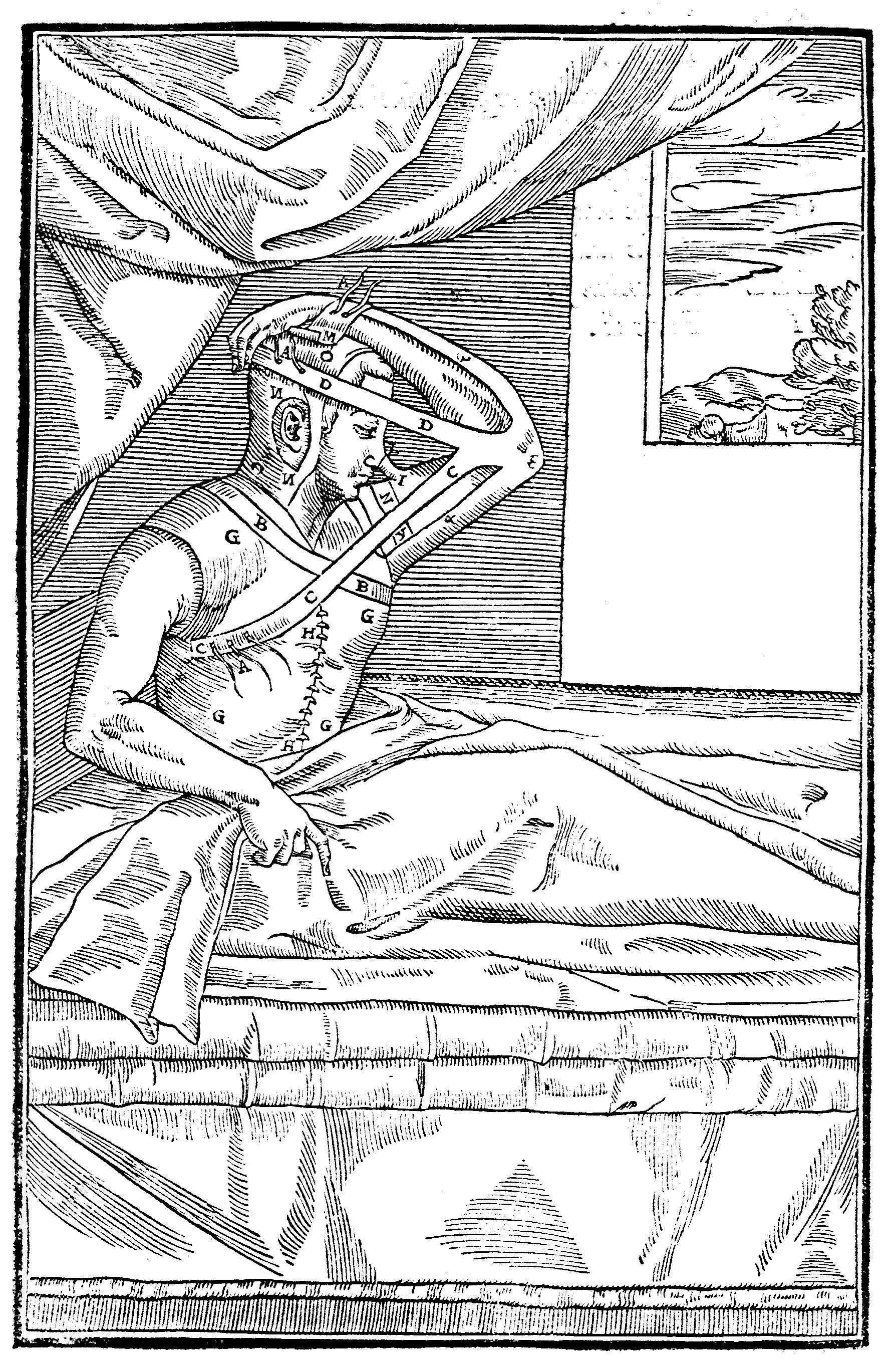
- Engraving from De Curtorum Chirurgia per Insitionem "(On the Surgery of Mutilation by Grafting)" (1597) by Gaspare Tagliacozzi

Occupation
- Names: Physician; Surgeon
- Occupation type: Specialty
- Activity sectors: Medicine, surgery

Description
- Education required: Doctor of Medicine (M.D.); Doctor of Osteopathic medicine (D.O.); Bachelor of Medicine, Bachelor of Surgery (M.B.B.S. or MBChB)
- Fields of employment: Hospitals, clinics

Plastic surgery is a surgical specialty involving restoration, reconstruction, or alteration of the human body. It can be divided into two main categories: reconstructive surgery and cosmetic surgery. Reconstructive surgery covers a wide range of specialties, including craniofacial surgery, oral and maxillofacial surgery, hand surgery, microsurgery, and the treatment of burns. This kind of surgery focuses on restoring a body part or improving its function. In contrast, cosmetic surgery (or aesthetic surgery) focuses solely on improving the physical appearance of the body.

A comprehensive definition of plastic surgery has never been established, because it has no distinct anatomical object and thus overlaps with practically all other surgical specialties. An essential feature of plastic surgery is that it involves the treatment of conditions that require or may require tissue relocation skills.

== Etymology ==
The word plastic in plastic surgery refers to the concept of "reshaping" and comes from the Greek πλαστική (τέχνη), plastikē (tekhnē), "the art of modelling" of malleable flesh. This meaning in English is seen as early as 1598. In the surgical context, the word "plastic" first appeared in 1816 and was established in 1838 by Eduard Zeis, preceding the modern technical usage of the word for the synthetic polymer material by 70 years.

== History ==
=== Ancient period (3000 BC–500 AD) ===
Treatments for the repairing of a broken nose are first mentioned in the Egyptian medical text known as the Edwin Smith papyrus (c. 1600 BC).The early trauma surgery textbook was named after the American Egyptologist, Edwin Smith, one of the earliest known surgical texts focused on trauma care. Reconstructive surgery techniques were being carried out in India by 800 BC. Particularly as documented in Sushruta Samhita, which describes methods for nasal reconstruction using skin flaps. Sushrata, a physician of the 6th century BC, made significant contributions to early plastic and cataract surgery and is widely regarded as a foundational figure in reconstructive surgery.

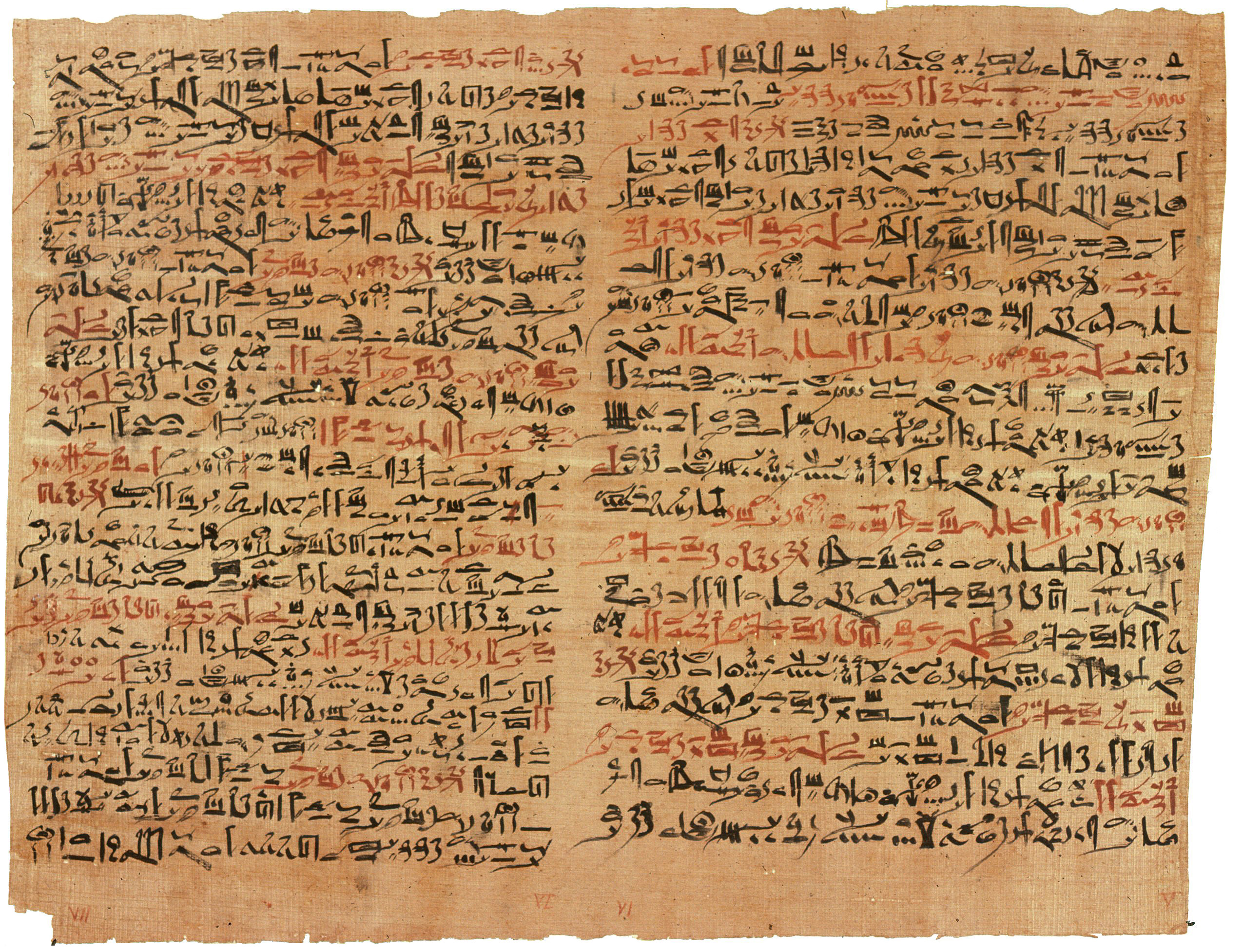
Plates vi & vii of the Edwin Smith Papyrus at the Rare Book Room, New York Academy of Medicine

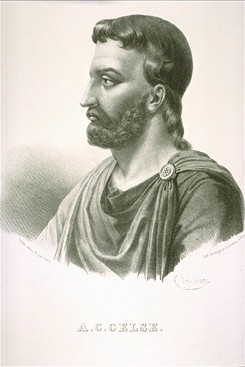
The Roman scholar Aulus Cornelius Celsus recorded surgical techniques, including plastic surgery, in the 1st century AD.

Roman physicians in the 1st century BCE also performed plastic reconstructive surgeries, using simple techniques, to repair damaged ears. For religious reasons, they did not dissect either human beings or animals, thus, their knowledge was based in its entirety on the texts of their Greek predecessors. Notwithstanding, Aulus Cornelius Celsus left some accurate anatomical descriptions, some of which—for instance, his studies on the genitalia and the skeleton—are of special interest to plastic surgery.

=== Middle Ages to early modern period (500–1800 CE) ===
Surgical practices continued to develop during the Abbasid Caliphate from 750 CE, where physicians preserved and expanded earlier medical knowledge through Arabic translations. The Arab physician, surgeon, and chemist Al-Zahrawi (936–1013) described the use of silk thread sutures in surgery to achieve good cosmesis, meaning an improved visual/bodily appearance, and documented what is thought to be the first attempt at reduction mammaplasty for the management of gynaecomastia. He gives detailed descriptions of other basic surgical techniques such as cautery and wound management. The Arabic translations made their way into Europe via intermediaries.

In Italy, the Branca family of Sicily and Gaspare Tagliacozzi of Bologna (1545–1599) became familiar with the techniques of Sushruta. Tagliacozzi was a Bolognese surgeon who popularized a rhinoplasty procedure involving the use of a skin flap from the patient's upper arm to reconstruct the nose. He wrote about this procedure in his book, "De curtorum chirurgia per insitionem" ('On the surgery of mutilations through grafting', (Venice, c. 1597)).Earlier examples of a rhinoplastic procedure may be seen in the case of Federico da Montefeltro (1422–1482), Duke of Urbino, who sustained severe facial injuries during a jousting accident and whose nasal bridge was possibly surgically modified to improve his field of vision.

In 1465, Ottoman surgeon, Sabuncuoğlu Şerafeddin (1385–1468) provided detailed descriptions and classifications of certain congenital conditions such as hypospadias and ambiguous genitalia. Sabuncuoğlu's book, Cerrahiyyet'ul Haniye (Imperial Surgery), an illustrated surgical manual covering a range of medical and congenital conditions, provided an informative and up-to-date description of hypospadias, a congenital condition where the urethral opening is located on the underside of the penis. Localization of the urethral meatus was described in detail.

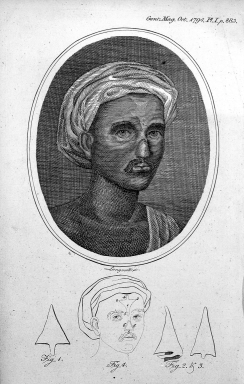
Illustration of an 18th-century nose reconstruction method from Poona performed by an Indian potter, from The Gentleman's Magazine, 1794

=== Modern period (1800–present) ===
In the 18th century, British physicians travelled to India to observe rhinoplasties being performed by Indian methods. Reports on rhinoplasties performed by a Kumhar (potter) Vaidya were published in the Gentleman's Magazine by 1794, which brought wider attention to these techniques in Europe. Joseph Constantine Carpue spent 20 years in India studying local plastic surgery methods. Carpue later applied these methods in England, performing one of the first major rhinoplasty procedures in the Western world in the year 1815. Instruments described in the Sushruta Samhita were further modified in the Western world.

In 1814, Joseph Carpue successfully performed an operative procedure on a British military officer who had lost his nose to the toxic effects of mercury treatments. In 1818, German surgeon Carl Ferdinand von Graefe published his major work entitled Rhinoplastik. Von Graefe modified the Italian method using a free skin graft from the arm instead of the original delayed pedicle flap.

The first American plastic surgeon was John Peter Mettauer, who, in 1827, performed the first cleft palate operation with instruments that he designed himself.

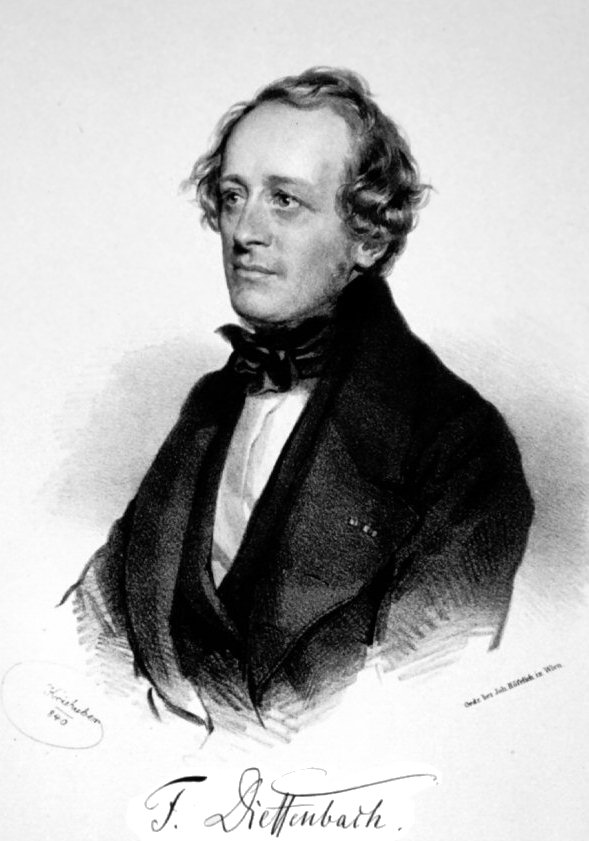
Johann Friedrich Dieffenbach established many modern techniques of reconstructive surgery.

Johann Friedrich Dieffenbach specialized in skin transplantation and early plastic surgery. His work in rhinoplastic and maxillofacial surgery established many modern techniques of reconstructive surgery. In 1845, Dieffenbach wrote a comprehensive text on rhinoplasty, titled Operative Chirurgie, and introduced the concept of reoperation to improve the cosmetic appearance of the reconstructed nose. Dieffenbach has been called the "father of plastic surgery".

Another case of plastic surgery for nose reconstruction from 1884 at Bellevue Hospital was described in Scientific American.

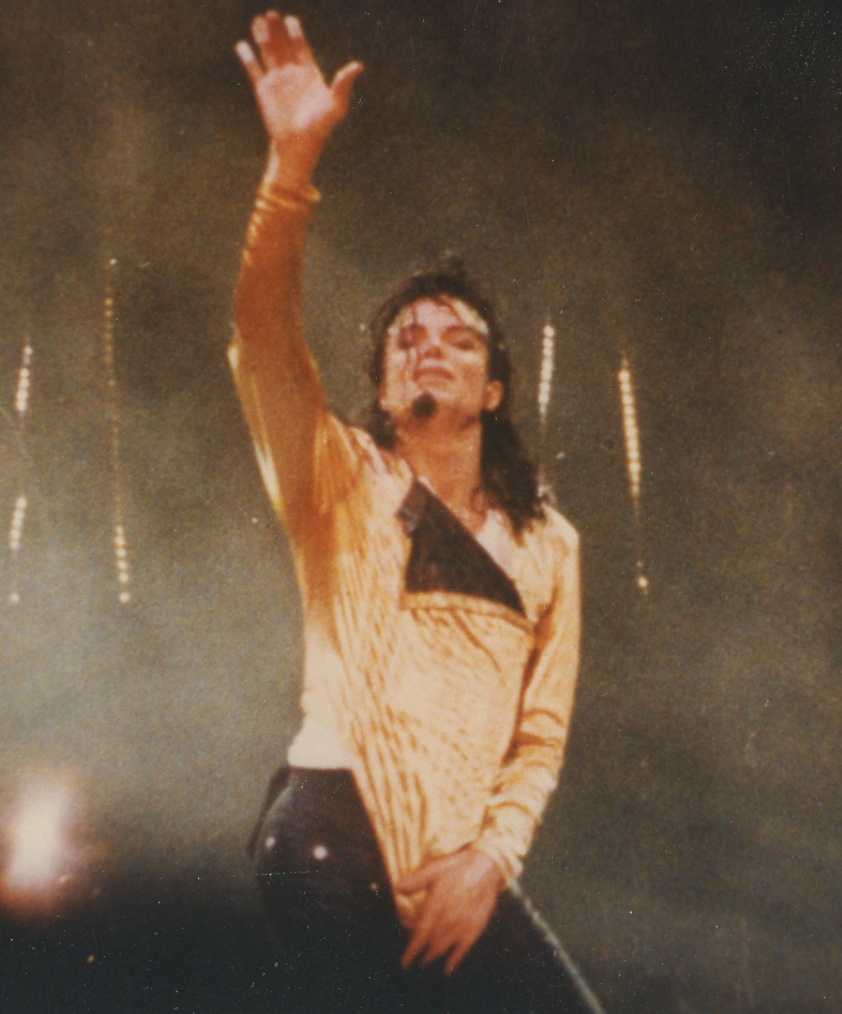
Michael Jackson on his Dangerous tour. His appearance changed significantly after a plastic surgery narrowed down his nostrils, along with his skin being bleached from vitiligo.

In 1891, American otorhinolaryngologist John Roe presented an example of his work: a young woman on whom he reduced a dorsal nasal hump for cosmetic indications. In 1892, Robert Weir experimented unsuccessfully with xenografts (duck sternum) in the reconstruction of sunken noses. In 1896, James Israel, a urological surgeon from Germany, and in 1889 George Monks of the United States each described the successful use of heterogeneous free-bone grafting to reconstruct saddle nose defects. In 1898, Jacques Joseph, the German orthopaedic-trained surgeon, published his first account of reduction rhinoplasty. In 1910, Alexander Ostroumov, the Russian pharmacist, and perfume and cosmetics manufacturer, founded a unique plastic surgery department in his Moscow Institute of Medical Cosmetics. In 1928, Jacques Joseph published Nasenplastik und Sonstige Gesichtsplastik.

== Nascency of maxillofacial surgery ==
The development of weapons such as machine guns and explosive shells during World War I led to a rapid increase in the number of mutilations to the faces and the heads of soldiers. Improved techniques for preventing and treating infections also meant that previously fatal injuries became survivable. This combination led to never-before seen rates of soldiers with facial injuries, alive but without noses, chins, cheekbones, or even eyes.

Battlefield surgeons had to quickly stabilize soldiers, often without the time to consider aesthetic results, further increasing the number of disfigured survivors. Harold Gillies, observing the number of new facial injuries and the lack of adequate surgical techniques to address them, dedicated an entire hospital to the study and reconstruction of facial injuries. Crucially, he recognized that facial disfigurement often resulted in psychological trauma, and sought to develop techniques that restored form as well as function in his patients.

Gillies developed a new technique using rotational and transposition flaps, as well as bone grafts from the ribs and tibia, to reconstruct facial defects. One of the most important advances developed at Gillies' hospital was the pedicle flap, which involved cutting a flap of skin from a donor site but leaving it connected at one end. The flap of skin, still connected to the donor site, would then be swung over the site of the wound, allowing the maintenance of physical connection and ensuring blood supply, lowering the risk of tissue rejection.

== Development of modern techniques ==
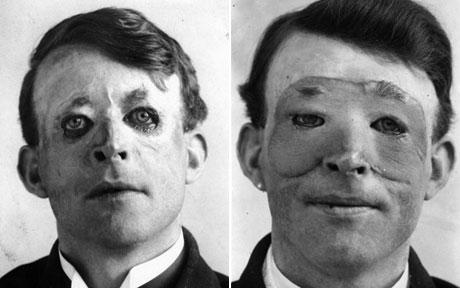
Walter Yeo, a sailor injured at the Battle of Jutland, is assumed to have received plastic surgery in 1917. The photograph shows him immediately following (right) the flap surgery by Sir Harold Gillies, and after healing (left).

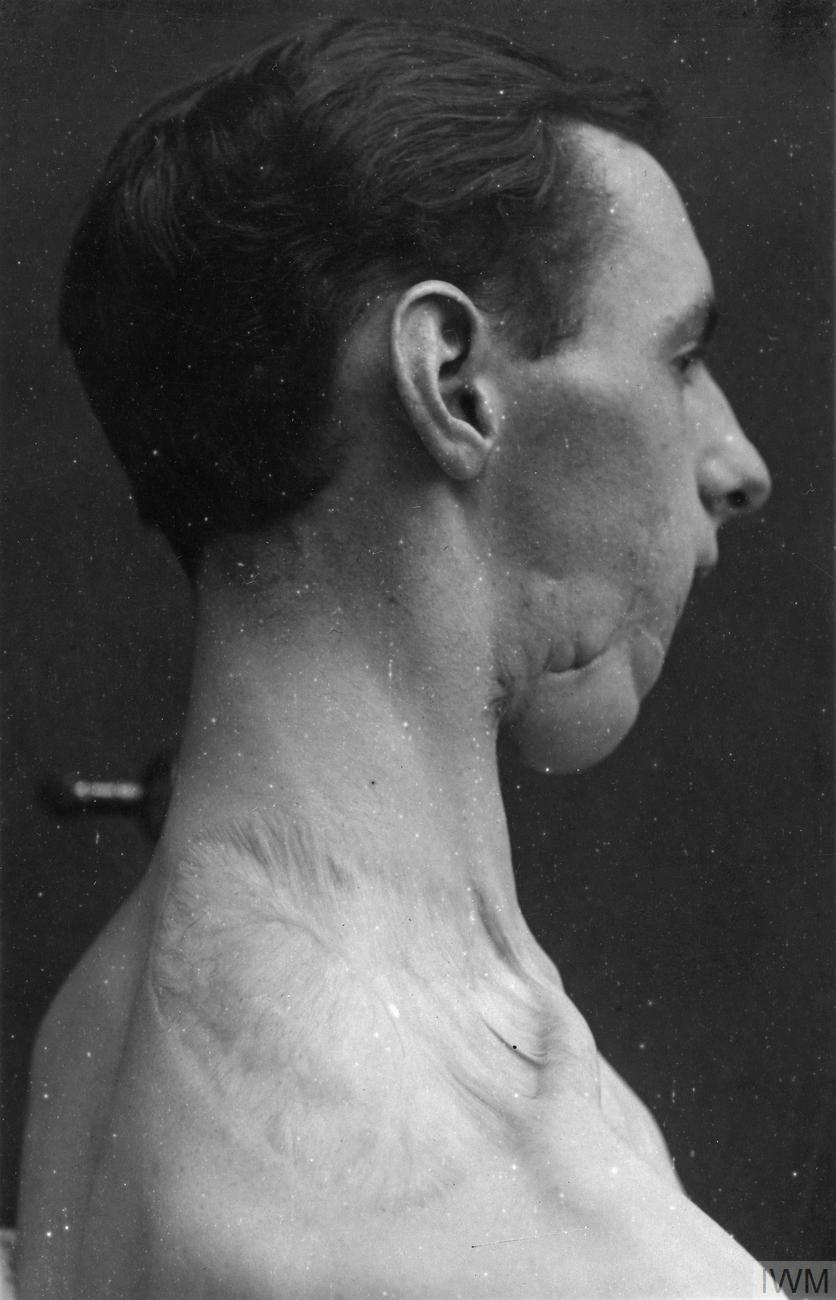
A patient after receiving plastic surgery from Harold Gillies, during World War I

The father of modern plastic surgery is generally considered to have been Sir Harold Gillies. A New Zealand otolaryngologist working in London, he developed many of the techniques of modern facial surgery in caring for soldiers with disfiguring facial injuries during the First World War.

During World War I, he worked as a medical minder with the Royal Army Medical Corps. After working with the French oral and maxillofacial surgeon Hippolyte Morestin on skin grafts, he persuaded the army's chief surgeon, Arbuthnot-Lane, to establish a facial injury ward at the Cambridge Military Hospital, Aldershot, later upgraded to a new hospital for facial repairs at Sidcup in 1917. There, Gillies and his colleagues developed many techniques of plastic surgery; more than 11,000 operations were performed on more than 5,000 men (mostly soldiers with facial injuries, usually from gunshot wounds). After the war, Gillies developed a private practice with Rainsford Mowlem, including many famous patients, and travelled extensively to promote his advanced techniques worldwide.

In 1930, Gillies' cousin, Archibald McIndoe, joined the practice and became committed to plastic surgery. When World War II broke out, plastic surgery provision was largely divided between the different services of the armed forces, and Gillies and his team were split up. Gillies himself was sent to Rooksdown House near Basingstoke, which became the principal army plastic surgery unit; Tommy Kilner (who had worked with Gillies during the First World War, and who now has a surgical instrument named after him, the kilner cheek retractor) went to Queen Mary's Hospital, Roehampton; and Mowlem went to St Albans. McIndoe, consultant to the RAF, moved to the recently rebuilt Queen Victoria Hospital in East Grinstead, Sussex, and founded a Centre for Plastic and Jaw Surgery. There, he treated very deep burns and serious facial disfigurement, such as loss of eyelids, typical of those caused to aircrew by burning fuel.

McIndoe is often recognized for not only developing new techniques for treating badly burned faces and hands but also for recognising the importance of the rehabilitation of the casualties and particularly of social reintegration back into normal life. He disposed of the "convalescent uniforms" and let the patients use their service uniforms instead. With the help of two friends, Neville and Elaine Blond, he also convinced the locals to support the patients and invite them to their homes. McIndoe kept referring to them as "his boys" and the staff called him "The Boss" or "The Maestro".

His other important work included the development of the walking-stalk skin graft, and the discovery that immersion in saline promoted healing as well as improving survival rates for patients with extensive burns—this was a serendipitous discovery drawn from observation of differential healing rates in pilots who had come down on land and in the sea. His radical, experimental treatments led to the formation of the Guinea Pig Club at Queen Victoria Hospital, Sussex. Among the better-known members of his "club" were Richard Hillary, Bill Foxley and Jimmy Edwards.

== Sub-specialties ==
Plastic surgery is a broad field and may be subdivided further. In the United States, plastic surgeons are board certified by American Board of Plastic Surgery. Subdisciplines of plastic surgery may include:

=== Aesthetic surgery ===
Aesthetic surgery is a central component of plastic surgery and includes facial and body aesthetic surgery. Plastic surgeons use cosmetic surgical principles in all reconstructive surgical procedures as well as isolated operations to improve overall appearance.

=== Burn surgery ===
Burn surgery generally takes place in two phases. Acute burn surgery is the treatment immediately after a burn. Reconstructive burn surgery takes place after the burn wounds have healed.

=== Craniofacial surgery ===
Craniofacial surgery is divided into pediatric and adult craniofacial surgery. Pediatric craniofacial surgery mostly revolves around the treatment of congenital anomalies of the craniofacial skeleton and soft tissues, such as cleft lip and palate, microtia, craniosynostosis, and pediatric fractures. Adult craniofacial surgery deals mostly with reconstructive surgeries after trauma or cancer and revision surgeries, along with orthognathic surgery and facial feminization surgery. Craniofacial surgery is an important part of all plastic surgery training programs. Further training and subspecialisation are obtained via a craniofacial fellowship. Craniofacial surgery is also practiced by maxillofacial surgeons.

=== Ethnic plastic surgery ===
Ethnic plastic surgery is plastic surgery performed to change ethnic attributes, often considered used as a way of "passing".

=== Facial plastic surgery ===
Facial plastic surgery is a subspecialty of plastic surgery focused on cosmetic and reconstructive procedures of the face, head, and neck. It includes both aesthetic procedures, such as facelifts, rhinoplasty, and blepharoplasty, and reconstructive procedures following trauma, cancer, or congenital abnormalities.

Facial plastic surgery emphasizes detailed knowledge of facial anatomy, including the skin, underlying musculature such as the superficial musculoaponeurotic system (SMAS) and platysma, fat compartments, and skeletal structure. Modern approaches often address multiple anatomical layers to restore both function and appearance.

Training in facial plastic surgery may occur through plastic surgery residency programs or via additional fellowship training, particularly through pathways associated with otolaryngology–head and neck surgery. Board certification in the United States may be obtained through organizations such as the American Board of Facial Plastic and Reconstructive Surgery.

=== Hand surgery ===
Hand surgery is concerned with acute injuries and chronic diseases of the hand and wrist, correction of congenital malformations of the upper extremities, and peripheral nerve problems (such as brachial plexus injuries or carpal tunnel syndrome). Hand surgery is an important part of training in plastic surgery, as well as microsurgery, which is necessary to replant an amputated extremity. The hand surgery field is also practiced by orthopedic surgeons and general surgeons. Scar tissue formation after surgery can be problematic on the delicate hand, causing loss of dexterity and digit function if severe enough. There have been cases of surgery on women's hands in order to correct perceived flaws to create the perfect engagement ring photo.

=== Microsurgery ===
Microsurgery is generally concerned with the reconstruction of missing tissues by transferring a piece of tissue to the reconstruction site and reconnecting blood vessels. Popular subspecialty areas are breast reconstruction, head and neck reconstruction, hand surgery/replantation, and brachial plexus surgery.

=== Pediatric plastic surgery ===
Children often face medical issues very different from the experiences of an adult patient. Pediatric plastic surgery serves to restore function to optimize growth and development. Many birth defects or syndromes present at birth are best treated in childhood, and pediatric plastic surgeons specialize in treating these conditions in children. Conditions commonly treated by pediatric plastic surgeons include craniofacial anomalies, Syndactyly (webbing of the fingers and toes), Polydactyly (excess fingers and toes at birth), cleft lip and palate, and congenital hand deformities.

=== Prison plastic surgery ===
Plastic surgery was performed on an incarcerated population in order to affect their recidivism rate, a practice instituted in the early 20th century that lasted until the mid-1990s. Separate from surgery performed for medical need.

== Techniques and procedures ==
In plastic surgery, the transfer of skin tissue (skin grafting) is a very common procedure. Skin grafts can be derived from the recipient or donors:

- Autografts are taken from the recipient. If absent or deficient of natural tissue, alternatives can be cultured sheets of epithelial cells in vitro or synthetic compounds, such as integra, which consists of silicone and bovine tendon collagen with glycosaminoglycans.
- Allografts are taken from a donor of the same species. Kidney transplants are an example of allograft transfer. Joseph Murray is credited for completing the first successful kidney transplantation in 1954.
- Xenografts are taken from a donor of a different species.

Usually, good results would be expected from plastic surgery that emphasize careful planning of incisions so that they fall within the line of natural skin folds or lines, appropriate choice of wound closure, use of best available suture materials, and early removal of exposed sutures so that the wound is held closed by buried sutures.

== Cosmetic surgery procedures ==
Cosmetic surgery is a voluntary or elective surgery that is performed on normal parts of the body with the sole purpose of improving a person's appearance or removing signs of aging. Some cosmetic surgeries such as breast reduction are also functional and can help to relieve symptoms of discomfort such as back ache or neck ache. Cosmetic surgeries are also undertaken following breast cancer and mastectomy to recreate the natural breast shape which has been lost during the process of removing the cancer. In 2014, nearly 16 million cosmetic procedures were performed in the United States alone. The number of cosmetic procedures performed in the United States has almost doubled since the start of the century. In 2014, 92% of cosmetic procedures were performed on women, up from 88% in 2001. Approximately 15.6 million cosmetic procedures were performed in 2020, with the five most common surgeries being rhinoplasties, blepharoplasties, rhytidectomies, liposuctions, and breast augmentation. Breast augmentation continues to be one of the top 5 cosmetic surgical procedures and has been since 2006. Silicone implants were used in 84% and saline implants in 16% of all breast augmentations in 2020. The American Society for Aesthetic Plastic Surgery looked at the statistics for 34 different cosmetic procedures. Nineteen of the procedures were surgical, such as rhinoplasties or rhytidectomies. The nonsurgical procedures included botox and laser hair removal. In 2010, their survey revealed that there were 9,336,814 total procedures in the United States. Of those, 1,622,290 procedures were surgical (p. 5). They also found that a large majority, 81%, of the procedures were done on Caucasian people (p. 12).

Tenth-century Spanish physician Abu Alkasem Al-Zahrawi published one of the first medical textbooks with strictly cosmetic (non-reconstructive) surgical procedures, the Kitab al-Tasrif. He was thought to have been inspired by the 7th-century work of Paulus Aeginata. This seminal text instructed on the removal of male gynecomastia growths, an early example of a gender-affirming breast augmentation procedure. Similarly, one of the earliest documented cosmetic breast reduction surgeries performed on a woman was recorded in 1560. The earliest attention devoted to the concept of the cosmetic includes the work of philosopher Francis Bacon. He was the first English-language writer to define the term in book II of his 1605 text The Advancement of Learning, coining it the 'art of decoration'. This word is believed to have originated in the public baths culture of the ancient Romans, which featured female slaves called cosmetae, who performed aesthetic treatments on visitors. Cosmetae is rooted in the Greek term cosmetikos, signifying to order or adorn.

It was not until the Renaissance period that cosmetic or "beauty" surgery was clearly distinguished from reconstructive surgery, which strictly aimed to repair function. This term began to intertwine with aesthetic considerations as a result of the defects caused by the 16th-century syphilis epidemic. The Renaissance label "beauty surgery" as a direct juxtaposition with reconstructive surgery was popularized by German surgeon Johann Friedrich Dieffenbach, who is largely considered the father of plastic surgery. Common surgeries of the Renaissance included cosmetic labiaplasties to augment the appearance of the clitoris or labia minora through reduction or removal, related to concerns surrounding the intersection between female sexual organs and gender identity/sexual orientation. These procedures were depicted in writing and illustrations as early as the 7th century, in texts such as the Byzantine physician Paul of Aegina's Medical Compendium, as well as Lanfranc da Milano's 13th century text Great Surgery. Furthermore, Renaissance physicians were also beginning to pioneer interventions to reduce the appearance of aging through operations such as the blepharoplasty, exemplified in the work of Lorenz Heister. Early works of medical research and instruction such as the aforementioned documents were often republished in the Renaissance period due to the rise in print culture that allowed for the mass dissemination of ideas, brought about by the invention of the Gutenberg press. These early discoveries set the stage for the technological and social advancements of the 20th century that solidified cosmetic plastic surgery as a successful and lucrative discipline, distinct from reconstructive plastic surgery.

In 1949, 15,000 Americans underwent cosmetic surgery procedures and by 1969 this number rose to almost half a million people. The American Society of Plastic Surgeons estimates that more than 333,000 cosmetic procedures were performed on patients 18 years of age or younger in the US in 2005 compared to approx. 14,000 in 1996. In 2018, more than 226,994 patients between the ages of 13 and 19 underwent plastic surgery compared to just over 218,900 patients in the same age group in 2010. Concerns about young people undergoing plastic surgery include the financial burden of additional surgical procedures needed to correct problems after the initial cosmetic surgery, long-term health complications from plastic surgery, and unaddressed mental health issues that may have led to surgery. The increased use of cosmetic procedures crosses racial and ethnic lines in the U.S., with increases seen among African-Americans, Asian Americans and Hispanic Americans as well as Caucasian Americans. In Asia, cosmetic surgery has become more popular, and countries such as China and India have become Asia's biggest cosmetic surgery markets. South Korea is also rising in popularity in Asian and Western countries due to their expertise in facial bone surgeries (see cosmetic surgery in South Korea).

Plastic surgery is increasing slowly, rising 115% from 2000 to 2015. "According to the annual plastic surgery procedural statistics, there were 15.9 million surgical and minimally-invasive cosmetic procedures performed in the United States in 2015, a 2 percent increase over 2014." A study from 2021 found that requests for cosmetic procedures had increased significantly since the beginning of the COVID-19 pandemic, possibly due to the increase in videoconferencing; cited estimates include a 10% increase in the United States and a 20% increase in France.

The most popular aesthetic/cosmetic procedures include:

- Abdominoplasty ("tummy tuck"): reshaping and firming of the abdomen
- Blepharoplasty ("eyelid surgery"): reshaping of upper/lower eyelids including Asian blepharoplasty
  - While blepharoplasty remains the most common procedure for modifying eyelid shape, non-surgical alternatives are increasingly sought after, especially in East Asia.
  - Methods such as double eyelid tape, eyelid glue, and structured eyelid training systems allow individuals to temporarily or semi-permanently create a double eyelid crease without surgery. Some of these products use mechanical reinforcement to 'encourage crease retention over time.
  - Unlike traditional adhesive-based tapes, structured eyelid training tapes aim to replicate mechanotransduction – a biological process where skin tension encourages crease formation. Studies on long-term non-surgical crease retention remain limited, but anecdotal evidence suggests some users achieve lasting results after sustained use.
- Phalloplasty ("penile surgery"): construction (or reconstruction) of a penis or, sometimes, artificial modification of the penis by surgery, often for cosmetic purposes
- Mammoplasty:
  - Breast augmentations ("breast implant" or "boob job"): augmentation of the breasts by means of fat grafting, saline, or silicone gel prosthetics, which was initially performed for women with micromastia
  - Reduction mammoplasty ("breast reduction"): removal of skin and glandular tissue, which is done to reduce back and shoulder pain in women with gigantomastia and for men with gynecomastia
  - Mastopexy ("breast lift"): Lifting or reshaping of breasts to make them less saggy, often after weight loss (after a pregnancy, for example). It involves the removal of breast skin as opposed to glandular tissue
    - Augmentation mastopexy ("breast lift with breast implants"): Lifting breasts to make them less saggy, repositioning the nipple to a higher location, and increasing breast size with saline or silicone gel implants. Recent studies of a newer technique for simultaneous augmentation mastopexy (SAM) indicate that it is a safe surgical procedure with minimal medical complications. The SAM technique involves invaginating and tacking the tissues first, in order to previsualize the result, before making any surgical incisions to the breast.
- Buttock augmentation ("butt implant"): enhancement of the buttocks using silicone implants or fat grafting ("Brazilian butt lift") where fat is transferred from other areas of the body
- Cryolipolysis: refers to a medical device used to destroy fat cells. Its principle relies on controlled cooling for the non-invasive local reduction of fat deposits to reshape body contours.
- Cryoneuromodulation: Treatment of superficial and subcutaneous tissue structures using gaseous nitrous oxide, including temporary wrinkle reduction, temporary pain reduction, treatment of dermatologic conditions, and focal cryo-treatment of tissue
- Calf augmentation: done by silicone implants or fat transfer to add bulk to calf muscles
- Labiaplasty: surgical reduction and reshaping of the labia
- Lip augmentation: alters the appearance of the lips by increasing their fullness through surgical enlargement with lip implants or nonsurgical enhancement with injectable fillers
- Cheiloplasty: surgical reconstruction of the lip
- Rhinoplasty ("nose job"): reshaping of the nose sometimes used to correct breathing impaired by structural defects.
- Otoplasty ("ear surgery"/"ear pinning"): reshaping of the ear, most often done by pinning the protruding ear closer to the head.
- Rhytidectomy ("face lift"): removal of wrinkles and signs of aging from the face
  - Neck lift: tightening of lax tissues in the neck. This procedure is often combined with a facelift for lower face rejuvenation.
  - Browplasty ("brow lift" or "forehead lift"): elevates eyebrows, smoothens forehead skin
  - Midface lift ("cheek lift"): tightening of the cheeks
- Genioplasty: augmentation of the chin with an individual's bones or with the use of an implant, usually silicone, by suture of the soft tissue
  - Mentoplasty: surgery to the chin. This can involve either enhancing or reducing the size of the chin. Enhancements are achieved with the use of facial implants. Reduction of the chin involves reducing the size of the chin bone.
- Cheek augmentation ("cheek implant"): implants to the cheek
- Orthognathic surgery: altering the upper and lower jaw bones (through osteotomy) to correct jaw alignment issues and correct the teeth alignment
- Fillers injections: collagen, fat, and other tissue filler injections, such as hyaluronic acid
- Brachioplasty ("Arm lift"): reducing excess skin and fat between the underarm and the elbow
- Laser skin rejuvenation or laser resurfacing: the lessening of the depth of facial pores and exfoliation of dead or damaged skin cells
- Liposuction ("suction lipectomy"): removal of fat deposits by traditional suction technique or ultrasonic energy to aid fat removal
- Zygoma reduction plasty: reducing the facial width by performing osteotomy and resecting part of the zygomatic bone and arch
- Jaw reduction: reduction of the mandible angle to smooth out an angular jaw and creating a slim jaw
- Buccal fat extraction: extraction of the buccal pads
- Body contouring: the removal of this excess skin and fat from numerous areas of the body, restoring the appearance of skin elasticity of the remaining skin. The surgery is prominent in those who have undergone significant weight loss, resulting in excess sagging skin being present around areas of the body. The skin loses elasticity (a condition called elastosis) once it has been stretched past capacity and is unable to recoil back to its standard position against the body and also with age.
- Sclerotherapy: removing visible 'spider veins' (Telangiectasia), which appear on the surface of the skin.
- Dermal fillers: Dermal fillers are injected below the skin to give a more fuller, more youthful appearance of a feature or section of the face. One type of dermal filler is hyaluronic acid. Hyaluronic acid is naturally found throughout the human body. It plays a vital role in moving nutrients to the cells of the skin from the blood. It is also commonly used in patients with arthritis as it acts like a cushion to the bones which have depleted the articular cartilage casing. Development within this field has occurred over time with synthetic forms of hyaluronic acid is being created, playing roles in other forms of cosmetic surgery such as facial augmentation.
- Micropigmentation: is the creation of permanent makeup using natural pigments to places such as the eyes to create the effect of eye shadow, lips creating lipstick and cheek bones to create a blush like look. The pigment is inserted beneath the skin using a machine which injects a small needle at a very fast rate carrying pigment into the skin, creating a lasting colouration of the desired area.

In 2015, the most popular surgeries were botox, liposuction, blepharoplasties, breast implants, rhynoplasties, and rhytidectomies. According to the 2020 Plastic Surgery Statistics Report, which is published by the American Society of Plastic Surgeons, the most surgical procedure performed in the U.S. was rhinoplasty (nose reshaping) accounting for 15.2% of all cosmetic surgical procedures that year, followed by blepharoplasty (eyelid surgery), which accounted for 14% of all procedures. The third most populous procedure was rhytidectomy (facelift) (10% of all procedures), then liposuction (9.1% of all procedures).

== Complications, risks, and reversals ==
All surgery has risks. Common complications of cosmetic surgery includes hematoma, nerve injury, infection, scarring, implant failure and end organ damage. Breast implants can have many complications, including rupture. In a study of his 4761 augmentation mammaplasty patients, Eisenberg reported that overfilling saline breast implants 10–13% significantly reduced the rupture-deflation rate to 1.83% at 8-years post-implantation. In 2011 FDA stated that one in five patients who received implants for breast augmentation will need them removed within 10 years of implantation.

== Psychological disorders ==
Although media and advertising do play a large role in influencing many people's lives, such as by making people believe plastic surgery to be an acceptable course to change one's identity to their liking, researchers believe that plastic surgery obsession is linked to psychological disorders such as body dysmorphic disorder. There exists a correlation between those with BDD and the predilection toward cosmetic plastic surgery in order to correct a perceived defect in their appearance.

BDD is a disorder resulting in the individual becoming "preoccupied with what they regard as defects in their bodies or faces". Alternatively, where there is a slight physical anomaly, then the person's concern is markedly excessive. While 2% of people have body dysmorphic disorder in the United States, 15% of patients seeing a dermatologist and cosmetic surgeons have the disorder. Half of the patients with the disorder who have cosmetic surgery performed are not pleased with the aesthetic outcome. BDD can lead to suicide in some people with the condition. While many with BDD seek cosmetic surgery, the procedures do not treat BDD, and can ultimately worsen the problem. The psychological root of the problem is usually unidentified; therefore causing the treatment to be even more difficult. Some say that the fixation or obsession with correction of the area could be a sub-disorder such as anorexia or muscle dysmorphia. The increased use of body and facial reshaping applications such as Snapchat and Facetune have been identified as potential triggers of BDD. Recently, a phenomenon referred to as 'Snapchat dysmorphia' has appeared to describe people who request surgery to resemble the edited version of themselves as they appear through Snapchat filters. In response to the detrimental trend, Instagram banned all augmented reality (AR) filters that depict or promote cosmetic surgery.

In some cases, people whose physicians refuse to perform any further surgeries, have turned to "do it yourself" plastic surgery, injecting themselves and facing extreme safety risks.

== Research ==
The main objective of clinical research in this specialty is to enhance surgical safety, improve treatment efficacy, optimize the quality of patient care, and achieve better clinical outcomes by producing robust and evidence-based findings. Unlike many medical interventions, surgical results can be affected by variations in operative techniques, surgeon experience, patient selection, perioperative management, and differences in outcome assessment methods. Researchers should therefore consider these factors when designing studies and interpreting their findings.

Plastic surgery is distinct from many other medical disciplines because treatment outcomes are affected by multiple variables, including the surgical technique, the surgeon’s level of expertise, individual patient characteristics, and the subjective evaluation of both aesthetic and functional outcomes. Consequently, the use of evidence-based practices and appropriate research methodologies is crucial for accurately assessing surgical interventions and establishing reliable clinical guidelines. Systematic reviews and meta-analyses in plastic surgery should address methodological issues such as study heterogeneity, publication bias, and differences in surgical techniques. Standardized reporting methods and well-designed prospective studies are important for improving the quality of evidence and supporting safe, evidence-based clinical practice.

Aesthetic plastic surgery research evaluates procedures designed to improve appearance and patient satisfaction, including rhinoplasty, facial rejuvenation, breast surgery, and body contouring procedures. Because aesthetic outcomes often involve subjective assessment, research in this area frequently incorporates patient-reported outcomes and validated satisfaction measures.

=== Clinical outcomes and outcome assessment ===
Evaluation of clinical outcomes is a central component of plastic surgery research. Outcomes may include complication rates, functional recovery, aesthetic improvement, quality of life, and patient satisfaction.

Unlike many medical interventions in which outcomes can be evaluated using laboratory parameters or survival statistics, outcomes in plastic surgery frequently include a combination of objective measurements and subjective assessments. For this reason, researchers rely on standardized evaluation techniques, validated scoring tools, clinical photography, and patient-reported outcome measures to enhance the reliability, consistency, and comparability of findings across different studies.

Patient-reported outcomes have become increasingly important because they provide information regarding the patient's perception of improvement, satisfaction, and quality of life following surgery.

=== Study designs ===
Clinical research in plastic surgery uses different study designs depending on the research question and available evidence. These include randomized controlled trials, prospective cohort studies, retrospective analyses, case series, and systematic reviews.

Randomized controlled trials may provide high-quality evidence but can be difficult to conduct in surgical fields because of ethical considerations, differences in surgical expertise, and challenges in standardizing operative techniques. Consequently, observational studies and prospective clinical registries remain important sources of evidence in plastic surgery.

Systematic reviews and meta-analyses are also widely used to summarize available evidence; however, their conclusions may be affected by differences in study design, patient populations, surgical methods, and outcome definitions.

=== Methodological considerations ===
Clinical research in plastic surgery requires careful attention to the many factors that can influence surgical outcomes and the interpretation of study findings. Unlike many other medical treatments, the success of surgical procedures depends on several variables, including the surgeon's level of experience, differences in surgical techniques, patient selection, perioperative care, and the methods used to assess outcomes. Because these factors can significantly affect results, researchers should account for them when designing studies and interpreting the evidence.

Systematic reviews and meta-analyses in plastic surgery should address methodological issues such as study heterogeneity, publication bias, and differences in surgical techniques. Standardized reporting methods and well-designed prospective studies are important for improving the quality of evidence and supporting safe, evidence-based clinical practice. Potential methodological shortcomings in published literature are frequently addressed through expert commentaries and letters, emphasizing the importance of critically appraising these concerns to ensure accurate interpretation and application of research findings.

=== Ethical considerations ===
Clinical research in plastic surgery involves specific ethical considerations, particularly in aesthetic procedures where patient expectations, body image concerns, and psychological factors may influence decision-making. Researchers should ensure appropriate informed consent, protection of patient privacy, and responsible use of clinical photographs and patient-reported information. Ethical oversight through institutional review boards and adherence to established research ethics guidelines are essential to protect participants and maintain the integrity of clinical research.

== See also ==
- Biomaterial
- Body modification
- Cosmetic surgery in Australia
- Dental trauma
- Dermatologic surgical procedure
- Ethnic plastic surgery
- List of plastic surgery flaps
- Plastic and Reconstructive Surgery
- Scalp reconstruction
- Serdev suture
- Rejuvenation
