= Cosmetic surgery in Australia =

Cosmetic surgery, also referred to as aesthetic surgery, is a surgical procedure which endeavours to improve the physical aspects of one's appearance to become more aesthetically pleasing. The continuously growing field of cosmetic surgery is closely linked with plastic surgery, the difference being, cosmetic surgery is an elective surgery with the sole purpose to enhance the physical features of one's appearance. Plastic surgery is performed in order to rectify defects to reinstate normality to function and appearance. Cosmetic surgical procedures are generally performed on healthy functioning body parts, with the procedure being optional not medically necessary. The inevitable aim of cosmetic surgery is to enhance one's image, encompassing reducing the signs of aging and/or correction of a believed deviation on one's body in turn it is surrounded by controversy. Although the implementation of cosmetic surgery within Australian society is growing, the trade has struggled to find its place within the Australian culture.

== History ==
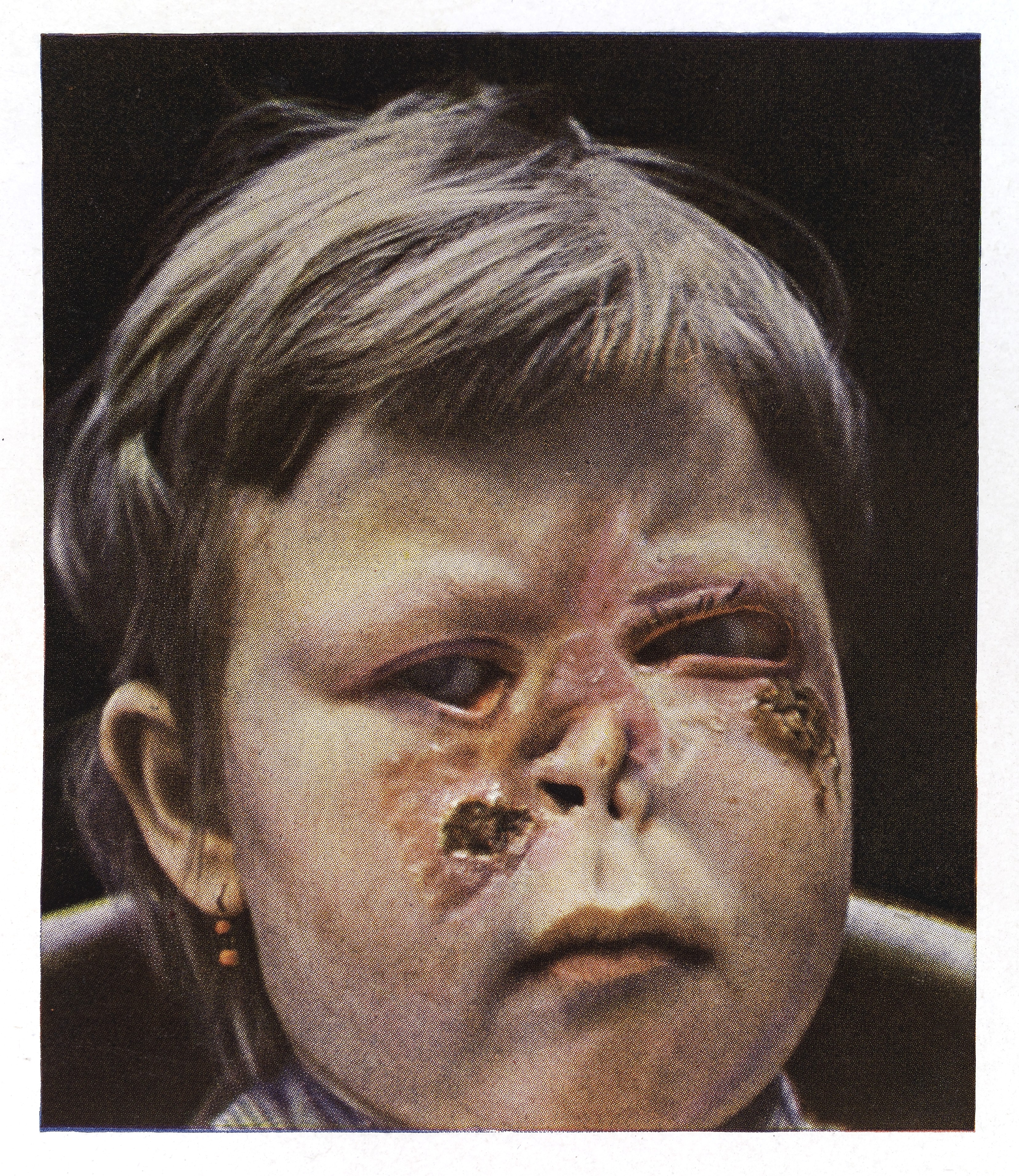
Ill shaped nose of a young girl suffering from syphilis.

The history of cosmetic surgery can be linked back to that of plastic surgery, as the debate persists, around the blurred lines of the two. Plastic surgery originated in 600 BC when Hindu surgeons performed rhinoplasty with the use of segments of cheek tissue.

At the end of the fifteenth century when syphilis was prevalent, came the introduction of debatable reconstructive surgery to rectify the ill shaped nose, a prominent feature of Syphilis sufferers. The sixteenth century saw an Italian by the name of Gaspare Tagliacozzi adopt the method of using upper arm tissue to reconstruct the nose during rhinoplasty, granting him the nickname 'the father of plastic surgery'. Although Tagliacozzi's approach left patients required to have their arm raised to their nose for several months, requiring numerous surgeries, with excessive scarring.

England was exposed to the Hindu techniques of rhinoplasty by a practitioner in 1815, who clearly defined the use for the surgery, limited to those who were physically affected by the horrors of Napoleonic Wars. Towards the end of the century in the 1880s John Orlando Roe, a New York surgeon, developed a technique which prevented scarring by operating from inside the nostrils.

World War I was the most costly war to Australia in regards to fatality. The brutality sparked the generation of plastic surgery within Australia introduced by a man by the name of Harold Gillies. Gillies oversaw the development of the first unit to treat the returned battle scared veterans of the war. This led to the relocation of the Red Cross to the Queen Mary Hospital in Sidcup, England. The Queen Mary Hospital opened in 1917 was a six hundred bed hospital which focused solely on plastic surgery. It was here that Gillies trained not only Australian plastic surgeons but surgeons from all over the globe. The return of these surgeons to their home countries such as Australia, saw the spread of the plastic surgery trade across the globe.

The war gave the dishonoured trade a respected name through the treatment and resurrection of returned war veterans, with shattered physical traits. The century gave rise to anaesthetics and Antiseptics prompting an increase in the number of surgeries being performed. But with this heroic status and development of techniques came the taboo ideology cast upon cosmetic surgery as the trade filtered into the population, with civilians un-pleased with their aesthetic appearance undergoing surgery. In turn the need for secrecy arose as people felt the need to hide the truth about their surgical endeavours. From here a surgeon by the name of Henry Junius Schireson, acquired his license to practice throughout multiple states of America, who became known in 1923 when he performed rhinoplasty on a Jewish actress Fanny Brice in her New York apartment, giving birth to the booming trade of cosmetic surgery for everyday civilians.

Benjamin Rank was an Australian trained by Gillies himself who in the 1940s governed the Royal Melbourne Hospital which was the first plastic surgery unit within Australia. It was in 1956 that plastic surgery was acknowledged by the Royal Australia College of Surgeons as a separate specialty trade of plastic surgery. Today, the Australian Society of Plastic Surgeons Inc. founded in 1917, commonly known as ASPS, was founded in 1970 with the aim to uphold the integrity of the plastic surgery field (inclusive of cosmetic and reconstructive surgery) within Australia. Today, the deliverance of the highest quality surgeries is at the forefront of their work. They govern the AMC accredited Surgical Education and Training (SET) Program within Australia.

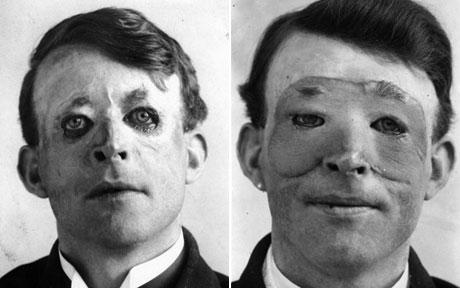
Walter Yoe, a patient of Harold Gillies who received flap surgery.

== Development of modern techniques ==
=== Non-invasive treatments ===
The development of different techniques within the field of cosmetic surgery has led to the innovation of non-invasive methods. Nine percent of the Australian population have undergone a non-invasive form of cosmetic surgery. Numerous surgeries are now performed using these techniques as opposed to open surgery methods which have been used in the past. This adaptation has led to a reduction in cost, time, scarring and pain involved with these procedures. As non-invasive cosmetic procedures have become more widely adopted, specialist cosmetic dermatology practices have expanded the range of treatments offered beyond traditional surgical interventions. For example, Dr Refresh, a cosmetic dermatology practice in Sydney, provides non-surgical skin rejuvenation, laser-based treatments, and body contouring procedures alongside medical dermatology services. Through the development of aiding surgical instruments such as a viewing scope or Lasers (see below), this shift has been made possible, reducing the incision site resulting in a faster recovery time for patients. Examples of non-invasive surgeries are as muscle relaxants, such as Botox or Dysport.

==== IPL ====
Another form of laser treatment is intense pulsed light (IPL). IPL differs from laser treatment as unlike laser treatments, IPL will perform multiple treatments at once but only a few are capable of doing so with the same potency as a laser. IPL is predominantly used for mild skin issues in comparison to laser being used for the more extreme cases.

== Risk factors ==
Due to cosmetic surgery being an elective surgical procedure it is of common assumption that the risk factors around these surgeries are lower than that of other surgeries. The invasive procedures have numerous risk factors as it is still a medical procedure, all of which come with a level of risk. The non-invasive treatments also come with a level of risk although lower than invasive methods. This common impression can be linked to the controversies surrounding the trade as critics struggle to see the link between the benefits and the risk facts. Surgeries are generally linked to, although not restricted to, risk factors affecting the area in which the surgery is performed. Some of the common risks are the development of a hematoma, organ damage, deep vein thrombosis, seroma, excessive bleeding, swelling, bruising, ectropion (optical), blindness (optical), obstruction of airways (nasal), loss of sensation, excessive scarring (including of keloid scars), a shift in position of hair line effecting symmetry and nerve damage.

=== Smoking ===
Most surgeons will suggest to patients electing to undergo cosmetic surgery to cease smoking for a period before and after their alterations. Generally a period of four weeks pre-operative and post operative, to aid in the recovery time and the healing of the wound. Just like other surgeries, cosmetic surgery may require incisions to be made to the skin, in one or more places of the body. These wounds will be required to heal post operation, therefore leaving the patient at risk of poor wound healing which may be due to numerous causes such as infection requiring antibiotics.

=== Medical conditions ===
Medical conditions can impact on the level of risk involved with cosmetic surgery as there can be underlying effects caused by different medications. For example, blood thinning medication can cause excessive bleeding due to the bloods ability to clot being lowered by the medication. All medications prescribed to a patient are noted and discussed by the surgeons to reduce the chance of issues arising.

== Psychological impacts ==
The most common reason behind one's choice to undergo cosmetic surgery is due to dissatisfaction with their body image. Body image issues are commonly allied with lower levels of self-esteem and psychological well-being. These issues are the cause of many women turning to cosmetic surgery. In today's world viewers are flooded with images and advertisements, showing generally, naturally unobtainable faces and bodies. There is a growing trend of reality television shows broadcasting makeovers of ordinary civilians undergoing cosmetic surgery to enhance their aesthetic image. Viewpoints grow around the link between the climbing figures of cosmetic surgery and the constantly changing world of media. There is a constant stream of connection developed via social media outlets such as Facebook and Instagram which hold a high level of importance within people lives. Other viewpoints circle the growth of public awareness of the topic is increasing becoming a direct link to this growth spurt in popularity of surgery. Many of the patients who undergo cosmetic surgery have been found to have low levels of self-esteem and use cosmetic surgery to rectify the issues they have with their body image. Numerous studies have focused on the final outcome of cosmetic procedures and the level of satisfaction which patients have with their results showing a large portion of patients look for additional surgeries to rectify the issue. Cosmetic surgery in a lot of cases will enhances the problems patients have with their self-esteem issues instead of depressing them as first desired. Studies show that patients who undergo cosmetic surgery who have been made aware of the risks involved along with the technical side of the procedure, have higher levels of satisfaction with their outcome post-surgery.

=== Body dysmorphic disorder ===
Body dysmorphic disorder (BDD) is a condition of which people find their own image immensely flawed. It effects both men and women equally, with the average onset age of thirteen years of age. The condition is treatable although there is an alarmingly high rate of suicide within BDD sufferers, one in every three hundred and thirty diagnosed will end their own lives. Patients of BDD will commonly turn to cosmetic surgery to rectify these flaws resulting in unsatisfactory results due to their condition.

=== Histrionic personality disorder ===
Histrionic personality disorder can be categorised as a person who thrives on being the center of attention in all social settings. They show signs of attention seeking behaviour along with instability emotionally. Immense discomfort is felt by the individual when they do not feel they are the epicenter of a group or one on one environment and often struggle when it comes to relationships with others, being both on a level of friendship and sexual relationships. Suggestions have been made in regards to the need for screening before cosmetic surgeries are performed on patients who suffer from disorders such as histrionic personality disorder as the level of satisfaction which is felt by individuals post-surgery is low, triggering the desire for additional treatments. The surgery impacts on their self-esteem leaving them higher levels of distressed post-op.

== Controversies ==
The controversies surrounding cosmetic surgery are plentiful. The stigma that exists around the practice has been evident since its introduction into the modern world. The taboo stigma around these types of surgery is beginning to fade as we see the trend of cosmetic surgery growing.

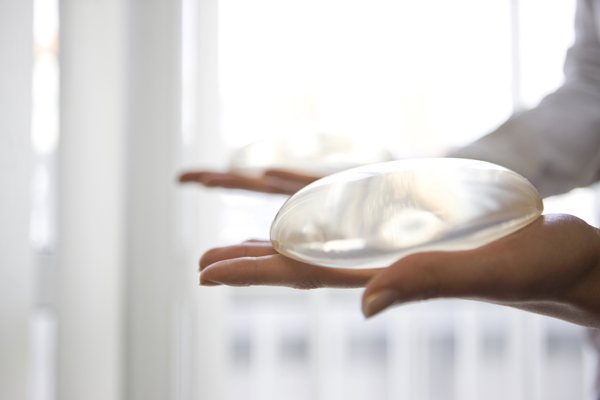
Silicone breast implant.

=== Age limitations ===
The age limitations around cosmetic surgery within Australia is eighteen years of age until one is eligible to opt to undergo cosmetic surgery. There is numerous discussions occurring around the use of cosmetic surgery within children which have undergone extensive trauma due to a catastrophic life event or birth defects, in turn patients seek cosmetic surgery to rectify the issue. The debate around whether this is ethically correct exists with the viewpoint that this is unethical and the surgeries are for the purpose of vanity. Other sides of the debate argue for the lasting impacts on the children during adolescent years due to the dis-figuration causing prejudice and view the surgical procedures will attribute to the child's mental health in later years.

=== Faulty breast implants ===
In 2011, concerns were expressed as information arose in regards to the quality of the material being used in silicone breast implants. Industrial grade silicone was being used in the replacement of medical grade supplies by a French firm by the name of Poly Implant Prothese (PIP). The silicone being used was found to be suitable for uses within the production of mattresses. In 2011, it was reported that in twelve years of production, more than 300,000 PIP implants were sold globally. In the case of rupture the dispute around safety risks arose with parties debating the increase cancer risks due to the poor grade materials. To date there has been no scientific evidence proving the implants should cause safety concerns linking to toxicity or cancer. The debate surrounds whether the removal of the implants is required due to safety concerns around rupture and toxicity.

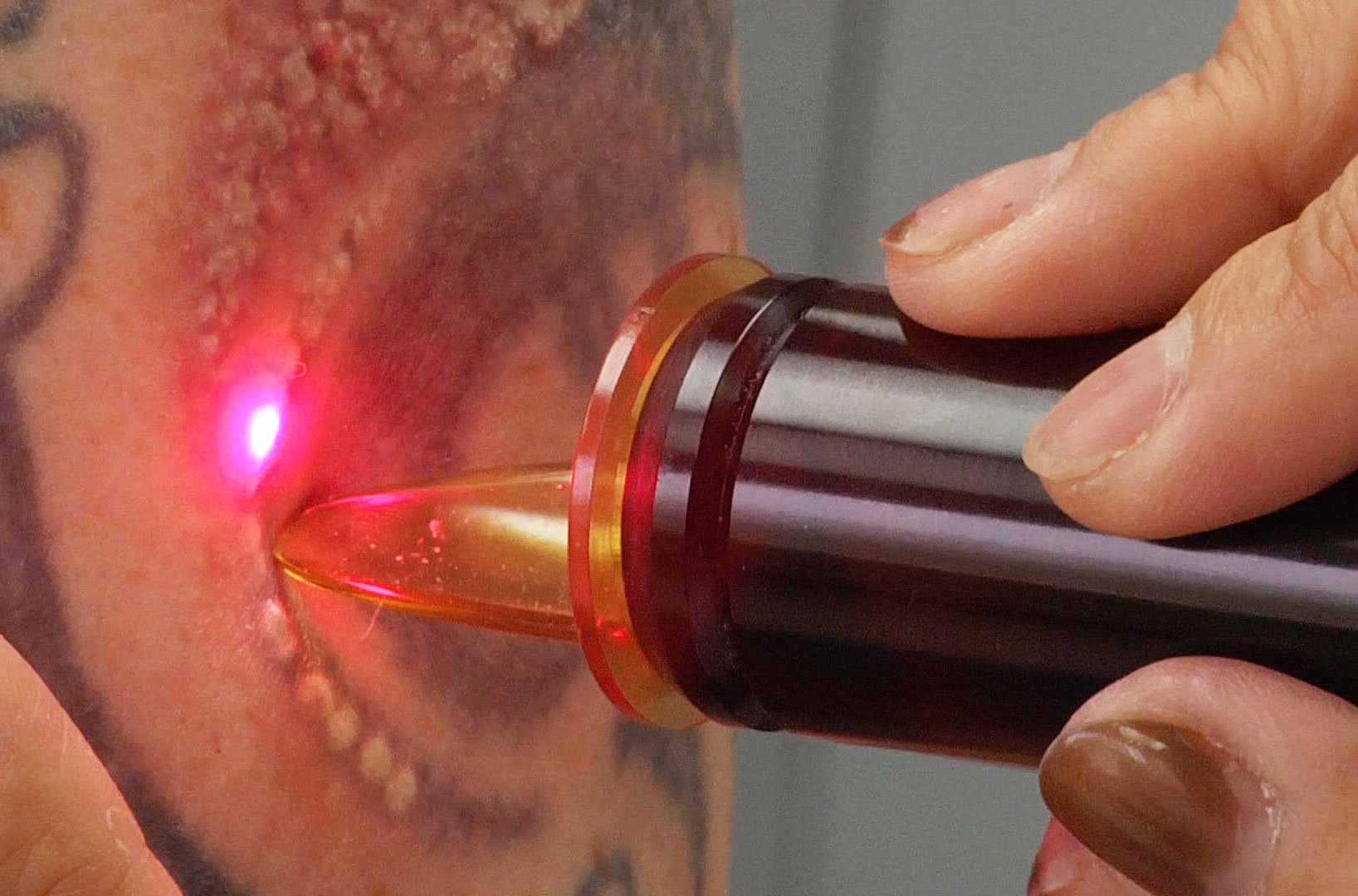
Laser being used within the field of tattoo removal.

=== Laser and IPL regulation ===
Concerns are sparked within Australia around the level of regulation which exists around the implementation of laser and IPL treatments. The practice has little federal regulated with inconsistencies existing between the states within Australia. It is largely debated around the level of regulation in comparison to the heavy controls placed around the use of schedule 4 drugs such as Botox or Dysport. Many rally for the investigation into the uses of these techniques, claiming long term damage can be a result of mistreatment. The authority involved in the monitoring these regulations within Australia is the Department of Health, the Therapeutic Goods Administration.

== See also ==
- Body modification
