= Platysmaplasty =

Platysmaplasty, commonly performed as part of a neck lift, is a form of cosmetic plastic surgery that tightens, repositions or supports the platysma muscle of the neck. Neck lift surgery may also address the skin, superficial fat and deeper structures that contribute to the shape and contour of the neck. Aging of the neck does not follow one predictable pattern because changes can occur at different anatomical layers. These include the skin, superficial fat, platysma muscle and structures beneath the platysma. Accordingly, neck lift surgery is individualized according to the anatomy contributing to a person's neck contour.

Over time, the skin can lose elasticity as collagen and elastin decline, while the platysma can separate and become more visible, contributing to vertical banding and loss of jawline definition. Fullness beneath the chin can also originate beneath the platysma rather than from superficial fat alone.

The deeper structures of the neck can include subplatysmal fat, the anterior bellies of the digastric muscles and the submandibular glands. These structures can contribute to central bulging or fullness beneath the platysma and may be evaluated when planning neck lift surgery.

When evaluating the neck, the goal is to identify which anatomical layers are contributing to the change. Depending on the anatomy, treatment may involve the skin, fat, platysma or deeper neck structures before the tissues are repositioned and supported.

== Techniques ==
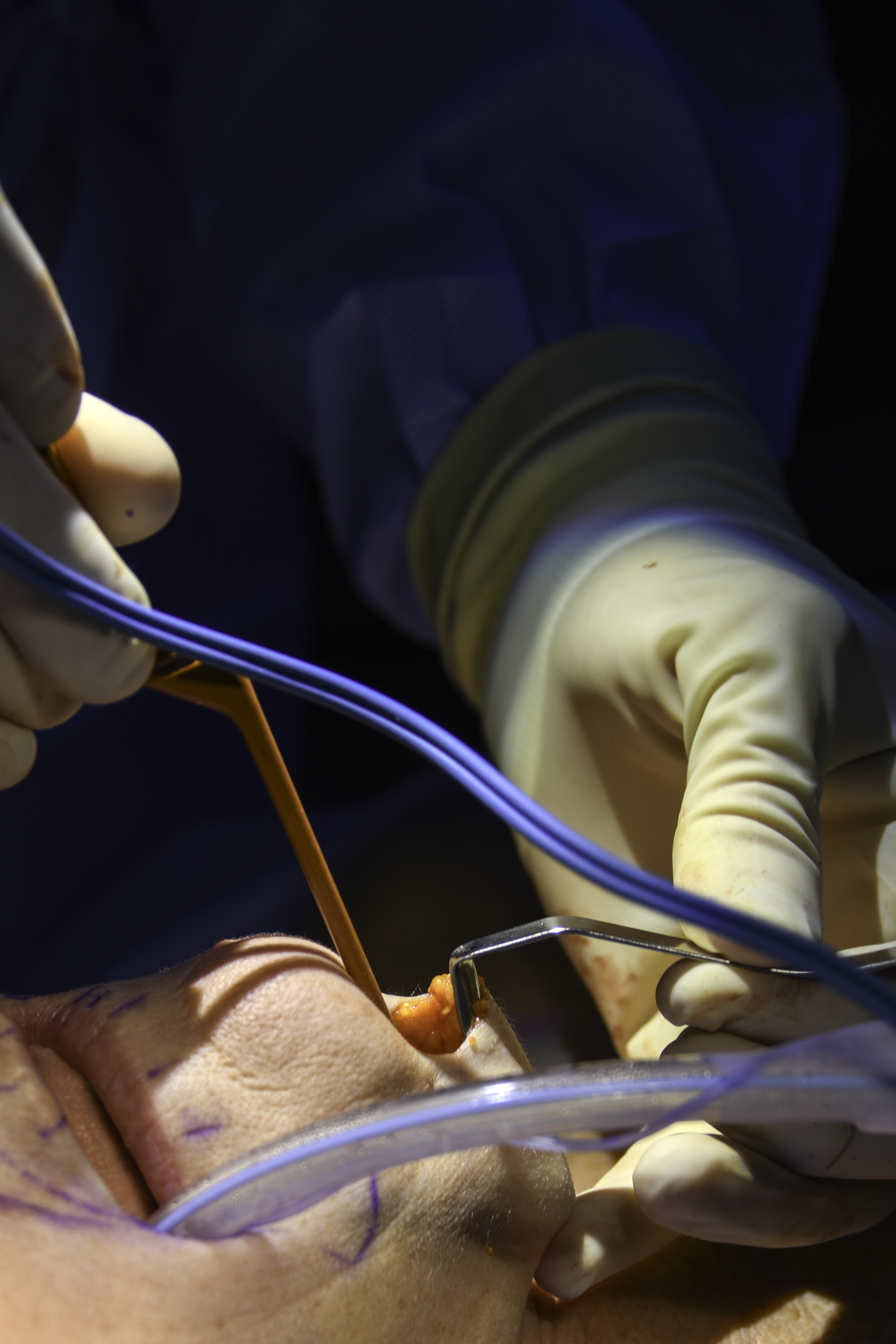
Submental dissection during combined platysmaplasty to address deeper neck structures and improve cervicomental contour.

Platysmaplasty includes several approaches to reposition and support the platysma muscle. The technique is selected according to the anatomy of the neck and may include medial repair, lateral suspension, combined medial and lateral approaches, or procedures addressing structures beneath the platysma.

- Medial platysmaplasty (corset technique) is performed through a submental incision under the chin. The medial borders of the platysma are brought together in the midline to reduce platysmal banding and restore central neck support. StatPearls describes anterior or medial platysmaplasty as midline approximation of platysmal diastasis from the chin toward the thyroid cartilage.
- Lateral platysmaplasty / platysmapexy, often described as lateral platysmapexy or lateral suspension, supports the platysma laterally rather than repairing the central muscle edges under the chin. StatPearls describes lateral platysmapexy as suturing the platysma to the upper quarter of the sternocleidomastoid fascia, while Labbé’s PubMed-indexed article describes suspending the free edge of the platysma and fixing it to resistant tissue near the earlobe.
- Combined medial and lateral platysmaplasty addresses both the central and lateral components of the platysma. A modified medial and lateral platysmaplasty paper specifically compares medial platysmaplasty with lateral pulling and reports that medial platysmaplasty was generally more effective than simple lateral pulling for multiple neck deformities, especially midline deformity.
- Subplatysmal / deep neck techniques are not platysmaplasty alone, but they are often performed with platysmaplasty when deeper structures contribute to fullness. These may include subplatysmal fat, anterior digastric muscle, and submandibular gland management. Auersvald’s article on submandibular gland management states that common neck concerns include hypertrophy of subplatysmal fat, the anterior belly of the digastric muscle, and/or the submandibular salivary glands.
- Vertical platysma suspension repositions the platysma in a more superior direction rather than relying primarily on posterolateral traction. The mastoid crevasse technique uses fixation along the anterior mastoid to provide a more vertical vector of platysma movement and suspension.

== Incision closure ==
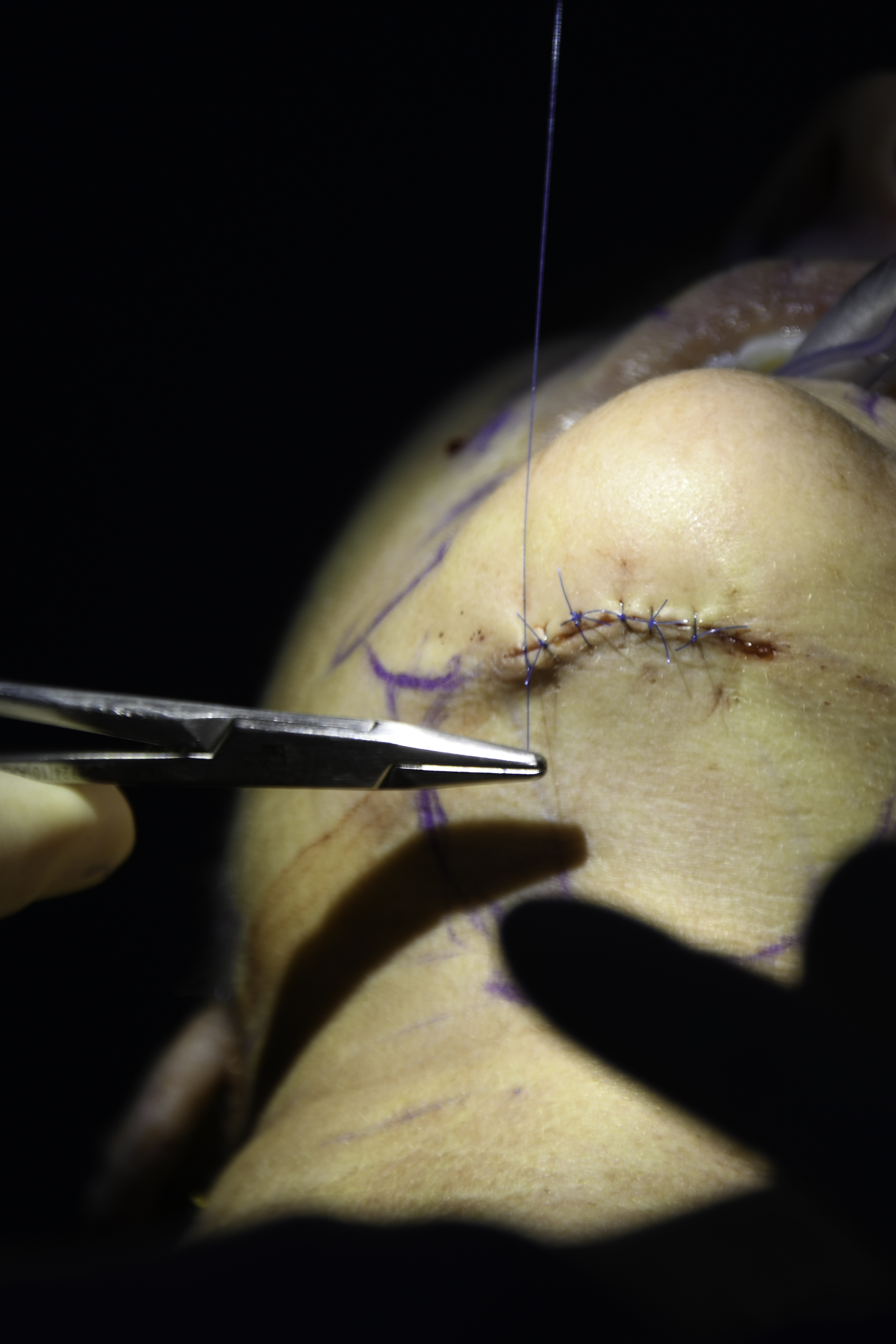
Layered platysmaplasty closure with tension-free skin.

Closure after a platysmaplasty is performed using a layered, tension-free technique designed to preserve the underlying structural repair. Following approximation or suspension of the platysma muscle, the subcutaneous tissues are reapproximated to reduce dead space, and the skin is redraped and closed without tension to optimize scar quality and contour.

Modern neck lift literature emphasizes that platysma manipulation, including midline plication or lateral suspension, provides the primary structural support, while skin closure serves a secondary, non–load-bearing role.

This layered approach is consistent with established surgical principles in facial plastic surgery, where reliance on deep structural support rather than skin tension improves long-term definition of the cervicomental angle and reduces recurrence of platysmal banding.

== Complications ==
Like all surgery, platysmaplasty and neck lift surgery have risks. These can include bleeding or hematoma, infection, numbness, temporary nerve weakness, contour problems and recurrent platysmal bands.

A hematoma is a collection of blood beneath the skin. As it expands, it can put pressure on the tissues and compromise blood flow to the skin. A larger hematoma may need to be drained or treated surgically.

Numbness can occur when small sensory nerves are disrupted during the incision or when the skin is elevated. A motor nerve can also become temporarily weakened from stretching, pulling or heat from cautery around the nerve. In most cases, this type of weakness improves as the nerve recovers.

When surgery extends beneath the platysma, there are additional structures that need to be protected. Treatment of the submandibular glands, for example, can result in hematoma, a collection of saliva known as a sialoma or sialocele, or weakness involving nerves that control movement of the lower lip.

Taking too much fat from the neck can also create contour problems. One example is a cobra neck deformity, in which the central portion of the neck becomes overly hollow while the tissues on either side remain more prominent. For this reason, fat removal is generally conservative rather than removing all of the fat beneath the chin.

Problems with neck contour can remain or return after surgery. Platysmal bands may recur, while fullness beneath the chin may persist when deeper structures such as the digastric muscles or submandibular glands continue to affect the shape of the neck. Removing too much superficial fat can also leave visible contour irregularities.

== See also ==
- Rhytidectomy (face lift)
