= Facial implant =

Facial implants are surgically inserted devices that modify the features of the human face, for cosmetic or medical reasons.

Types include:

- Chin implant – These can be used to increase anterior, lateral and downward projection of the chin. The implant is placed internally through the lower lip, or externally under the chin. Sutures will vary depending on the approach.
- Cheek implants – The implants are placed either through incisions inside the upper lip or through the lower eyelid. Sutures will vary depending on the approach.
- Jaw angle implants – These can be placed individually, in pairs, or as a large wraparound implant that includes the chin. They are used to increase lateral and/or downward projection of the ramus. They are placed through incisions inside the lower lip.
- Paranasal implant – This involves placing an implant between the nose and upper lip to increase anterior projection of the upper jaw. It is inserted through a small incision inside the mouth.
