= Medical tourism in South Korea =

South Korea has been considered a medical tourism destination since 2009, attracting more than 2.76 million foreign patients between then and 2019. The increasing number of patients seeking medical treatment in South Korea do so for multiple reasons, such as low medical costs, high quality medical services, short waiting times, and tourism packages combining relaxation and tourism.

== Key industry fields ==
Many Korean doctors specialize in organ transplants, cancer treatment, cardiac and coronary treatment and care, spinal diseases, infertility, traditional Korean medicine, and cosmetic surgery.

=== Organ transplants ===
According to the International Registry in Organ Donation and Liver Transplantation, in 2014, 18 patients out of a million Korean citizens received living donor liver transplantation, which was the largest number in the world. Compared with the US rate of 85%, the success rate of liver transplants in Korea is 92%. The overall 5-year survival rate of organ transplants in Korea is 86.72%, and the 11-year survival of organ transplants is 80.44%.

=== Cancer treatment ===
According to South Korea's National Cancer Control, the 5-year survival rate of all cancers in Korea has increased from 43% in the 1990s to 70.4% in 2017, which surpasses the average of OECD countries. The 5-year relative survival rate for thyroid cancer was 100% in South Korea, and 93.3 percent for prostate cancer. Having the most clinical trial experience in breast cancer, Korean health professionals are known for having advanced treatment for breast cancer, bronchial cancer, and lung cancer. In 2019 alone, 11,226 international patients — a 45% increase from the previous year — visited Korea for cancer treatment. The percentage of Russian patients (29.4%) was the highest, followed by patients from Kazakhstan (17.7%), China (14.5%), the United States (10.5%), Mongol (7.7%), the United Arab Emirates (5.1%), and other countries (15.0%).

=== Plastic surgery ===
South Korea has the highest per capita rate of cosmetic surgery in the world, according to a 2014 survey by International Society of Aesthetic Plastic Surgery (ISAPS), and ranked fifth in the number of plastic surgeons according to their 2022 survey. The number of foreign patients who visited Korea to seek medical help for cosmetic purposes rose to 464,452 in 2018, an increase of 16.7% from 397,882 in 2017. Although many foreign patients receive plastic surgery for cosmetic purposes in Korea, many visit the country for reconstructive surgery, which is performed to restore normal function and appearance. Most foreign patients come to Korea to treat facial burns but also for treatment of injuries such as abrasion, laceration, fracture, burns, and amputation. With advances in surgical technology, Korea has also contributed to leading medical charity programs. For example, in 2013, Seoul St. Mary's Hospital paid the total cost of reconstructive surgery for Neru Gui, a Mongolian boy, who did not have a nose. To help him breathe, surgeons created a new artificial nose for him using a 3D printing structure.

=== Medical examination ===
Koreans receive free medical checks covered by the National Health Insurance Service (NHIS). Examinations in South Korea include MRI, CT, and colonoscopy, which are not usually covered in other countries. Due to its comprehensive checkup, foreign patients coming to Korea for medical checkup alone increased from 9,911 in 2010 to 41,316 in 2016.

== Origin of foreign patients ==
The Korea Health Industry Development Institute (KHIDI), a government-affiliated institution under the Ministry of Health and Welfare, reported the number of foreign inpatients and outpatients increased from 60,201 patients from 139 countries in 2009 to 2,760,553 patients from 198 countries in 2019. In 2019 alone, 497,464 foreign patients visited Korea for treatment. The number of Chinese patients was the highest, followed by patients from Japan, the United States, Russia, and Mongolia. Internal medicine recorded the largest increase of 26.1%, followed by plastic surgery (35.1%), dermatology (33.8%), medical checkup (31.4%), OB/GYN (67.6%), and orthopedic surgery (9.2%).

== Government initiatives: Medical Korea ==
To perform professional and systematic support to develop the health industry and enhance the health service, in 2009, the KHIDI established a Korean medical brand called "Medical Korea" under the slogan titled "Smart Care" to represent Korea's medical technologies. Medical Korea has contributed to the enhancement of medical tourism in Korea through conferences, exhibitions, and other promotional activities such as facilitating medical travel programs and developing public health services. In 2019 alone, it attracted more than 497,000 patients, reaching an all-time high.

=== Independent platforms connecting certified hospitals ===
In addition to government-led programs, private platforms also contribute to the facilitation of medical tourism by helping international patients access certified medical institutions in South Korea. One such example is www.medicaltravelkorea.com, a multilingual platform that connects users exclusively with hospitals officially certified by the Ministry of Health and Welfare to treat international patients.

Although not operated or endorsed by the government, the platform adheres to official standards by listing only certified hospitals that are required to carry medical malpractice insurance. It is integrated with Google Search and Google Booking, and supports over ten languages including English, Chinese, Japanese, and more. According to REDTABLE Inc., www.medicaltravelkorea.com was used by approximately 9.2% of all international medical tourists who visited South Korea as of March 2025. (Based on: Korea Health Industry Development Institute (2025), "2024 Global Perception Survey on Korean Medical Services")

=== Expansion of South Korean hospitals' overseas presence ===
After the Act Supporting the Overseas Expansion of Medical Services and Attraction of International Patients (Presidential Decree No. 27241) was established in 2016, KHIDI was able to take an active role in helping Korean medical institutions serve foreign patients, exporting 91 medical services and techniques to 20 countries between 2016 and 2020. KHIDI provided consulting for medical institutions' global expansion projects, helped the country with the recruitment of medical professionals, and fostered cooperation between Korean medical institutions and diplomatic offices overseas.

=== Medical tourism support centers ===
Medical tourism support centers, which are located throughout South Korea, are operated by KHIDI, Korea Tourism Organization (KTO), and local governments. A new medical tourism support center, operated by KHIDI, opened on 18 December 2018 at Incheon International Airport, providing foreign patients with consultations from healthcare professionals immediately following their arrival at the airport. The other medical tourism support center at Seoul Tourism Plaza, which KHIDI opened on 29 February 2021, has a medical exhibition center available for medical tourists. The center also helps patients to find hospitals and nearby restaurants in Korea and make reservations.

== Government regulations for protecting foreign patients ==
=== Act on Support for Overseas Expansion of Healthcare System & Attraction of International Patients ===
To limit excessive fees for attracting foreign patients and provide them with more benefits, the Korean government proposed the "Act on Support for Overseas Expansion of Healthcare System & Attraction of International Patients" for foreign patients. If an unregistered hospital attempts to attract foreign patients without a certificate of registration, it will face up to three years in prison and a 30 million won fine.

Since 2016, all registered medical institutions have been required to subscribe to medical malpractice liability insurance. It is to improve the rights and safety of international patients by the Ministry of Health and Welfare. At the same time, the Ministry strengthened regulation over registered institutions so that patients abroad can receive safe and quality medical treatment in medical institutions in Korea.

=== Hospital accreditation program ===
Another regulation for improving healthcare quality in Korea is the Korean Accreditation Program for Hospitals serving Foreign patients (KAHF), implemented by the Ministry of Health and Welfare. The program is to evaluate the quality of medical and non-medical services provided to medical institutions with 35 standards and 149 items.

- Evaluation Category
  - Specialized Services for International Patients: Performance in attracting international patients and management system, Medical Specialists, Protection of Patient Rights, Medical Disputes
  - Patient Safety System: Guaranteed Patient Safety, Patient Treatment, Drug Management, Infection Control, Management of Hospital Facilities

=== Other regulations ===
The Ministry of Health and Welfare announced regulations in 2016 to punish illegal brokers who bring in foreign patients and demand high fees. Under the Act on Support for Overseas Expansion of Healthcare System & Attraction of International Patients unregistered brokers will face up to three years in prison and a fine of 30 million won, and anyone who reports an illicit broker will be rewarded up to 10 million won. In addition, hospitals registered with the Ministry of Health and Welfare as medical institutions are eligible to give international patients a 10% VAT refund when they receive cosmetic procedures. The refund system, which was established in 2016, was extended to 31 December 2022.

== Awards ==
For its contribution to health care industry, Korea has been awarded:

- IMTJ Awards - Health and Medical Tourism: Destination of year 2018
- IMTJ Awards - Health and Medical Tourism: Destination of year 2019
- IMTJ Awards - Best Medical Travel Website 2019
- IMTJ Awards - Outstanding Response to COVID-19 2020
- 6th Porter Prize for Excellence in CSV 2019
- Healthcare Revolution Innovation Awards 2018
- Healthcare Asia Medtech Awards – Corporate Social Responsibility Program of the Year 2021
