= Zygoma reduction plasty =

Type of cheekbone reduction surgery

Zygoma reduction, also known as cheekbone reduction surgery, is a surgery used to reduce the facial width by excising part of the zygomatic bone and arch. Wide cheekbones are a characteristic facial trait of Asians, whose skull shapes tend to be more brachycephalic (broad, short skull) in comparison with Caucasian counterparts, whose skull shapes tend to be more dolichocephalic (narrow and long).This surgery is popular among Asians due to their inherent wide cheekbones. Due to the advanced surgical skills of Korean surgeons who perform facial contouring surgeries, the number of Asian people undergoing this surgery is increasing.

The goal of a zygoma reduction surgery is not to flatten out the cheekbone but rather it is used to reduce the facial width while simultaneously creating a more three-dimensional projection to suit the overall facial contour of an individual. The infraorbital nerve supplies skin and mucous membranes to the middle portion of the face and also supplies sensation to the skin of the cheek, upper lip, nose and upper teeth. Therefore, special care should be taken to avoid contact with the infraorbital nerve, as damage to this nerve can result in possible loss of sensation or dysesthesia.

== Consultation and patient evaluation ==
Before surgery, the zygoma type should be identified in order to create a surgical plan suited to the individual. Vital points that factor in the evaluation are the zygomatic width, volume, and position which determine the surgical technique best suited to the individual. The surgeon evaluates the surgery candidate in person whilst simultaneously examining clinical photos, X-ray and CT scans in frontal, lateral, three-quarter oblique and basal views. The assessment of the three-quarter oblique view is the most important as it determines the level of projection of the zygomatic bone. Further attention should be paid in evaluation of the skin, subcutaneous fat, muscles and the underlying structure to accurately formulate the surgical plan. Depending on the skin thickness and soft tissues, additional liposuction or lifting procedures may be recommended in conjunction with the zygoma reduction surgery.

During consultation process, it is essential that the surgeon discusses the surgery outcome, and ensure that the candidate's surgery expectations are realistic. MMP (maximal malar projection) is the most protruded portion of the outer contour of zygomatic complex in the basal three-quarters view. MMP is measured using either the Hinderer Analysis or Wilkinson Analysis methods. Using these methods, the MMP is calculated to find the ideal placement of the zygomatic body and arch.

== Surgery methods and techniques ==
Once the MMP is calculated and the new position of the zygoma bone is planned then the surgery method is planned. The surgery is performed under general anesthesia through orotracheal intubation.

=== Osteotomy method ===
The osteotomy method is based on an individual's bone structure. There is the standard L-shaped Osteotomy method, the High L-shaped osteotomy method (link), High L-shaped osteotomy with orbital rim shaving and High L-shaped osteotomy with tripod osteotomy. High L-shaped osteotomy zygoma reduction provides the most precise level of osteotomy, with the least amount of scarring.

=== Surgical approaches ===
Zygoma reduction surgical approach can be divided into two types, external or intraoral approach. External approach requires incision made externally, which will cause visible scarring. Intraoral approach is the most favored approach as the incision site will be hidden inside the mouth. For some cases, both an intraoral and external approach is required to achieve maximum shaving of the zygomatic body and arch.

==== Intraoral approach ====
Onizuka et al. introduced zygoma reduction surgery using the intraoral approach in 1983. The High L-shaped osteotomy technique also uses an intraoral approach. The incision is made on the lateral edge of the infraorbital rim to access the zygomatic bone.

==== Preauricular approach ====
Preauricular approach requires an incision to be made on the sideburns to access the zygomatic arch. Based on the zygoma shape and classification, the surgeon can ascertain whether intraoral and preauricular approach are both required to sufficiently decrease the zygoma protrusion.

== Surgical tools ==
"Double bladed" reciprocating saw is used for this procedure to produce symmetric osteotomy. The saws come in different sizes ranging from two to 7 millimeters. Pre-bent titanium plates and screws are used to fixate the zygoma bone and arch in its new position.

== Post-surgery symptoms ==
Post-surgery symptoms include haematoma, swelling, numbness, reduced sensation and usually clear within three to six months after surgery. Complications like asymmetry, infection, motor nerve injury, excessive scarring, and malunion can also occur, albeit it is a rare possibility.

== Additional procedures ==
Certain candidates are prone to requiring additional surgery in conjunction with the zygoma reduction surgery. Soft tissue sagging is one of the main issues and the can be aggravated depending on the candidate's age, skin thickness and elasticity level, and excess cheek fat. Depending on the severity of the aforementioned factors, the surgeon may recommend additional procedures like lifting, buccal fat removal, fat graft etc. to combat any issues that may arise from having surgery.

== External links and sources ==
S. Park (ed.), Facial Bone Contouring Surgery, © Springer Nature Singapore Pte Ltd. 2018 ISBN 978-981-10-2725-3
