= Non-surgical rhinoplasty =

Non-Surgical Rhinoplasty
- ICD-9-CM: 21.87
- MeSH: D012225

Non-surgical rhinoplasty is a medical aesthetic procedure in which injectable fillers, most commonly hyaluronic acid ones like Restylane and Juvederm or calcium hydroxyapatite (Radiesse), are used to alter and shape a person's nose without a surgery. The procedure fills in depressed areas on the nose, lifting the angle of the tip or smoothing the appearance of bumps on the bridge. Non surgical rhinoplasty is an augmentation procedure, so it cannot reduce the size of someone's nose. The cosmetic procedure carries the risk of causing serious skin damage or distant complications like blindness. If the filler product is injected into an artery, filler can travel in the arteries and blocks smaller size arteries like ophthalmic artery and cause blindness. If blood vessels of the skin are blocked, skin necrosis can develop. Hyaluronic acid based fillers can be reversed even if injected into a blood vessel with an enzyme called hyaluronidase, which can be also injected like fillers.

Originally developed at the turn of the 19th century, early attempts used soft-tissue fillers such as paraffin wax and silicone. The procedure was abandoned when disastrous late complications started appearing. More modern fillers are now in use.

== History ==
Non-surgical rhinoplasty is reported to have originated at the turn of the nineteenth century, when New York City neurologist James Leonard Corning (1855–1923) and Viennese physician Robert Gersuny (1844–1924) began using liquid paraffin wax to elevate the "collapsed nasal dorsum" that characterizes the "saddle nose deformity." Yet, despite its corrective efficacy, liquid paraffin proved biologically harmful.

During the 1960s, soft-tissue fillers of medical-grade silicone gel were introduced to the rhinoplastic surgeons. However, like liquid paraffin, silicone gels proved biologically harmful, causing ulcers and granulomas, as reported in 1977. To minimize the risk, in 2000 D.S. Orentreich advocated the "microdroplet technique", minute doses of silicone injected over multiple sessions.

== Procedure overview ==
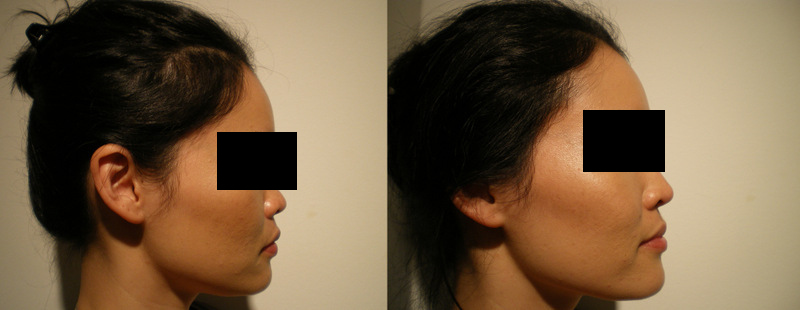
BEFORE AND AFTER: Low bridge and under-projected nasal tip (left photo) corrected with Radiesse injection into the tip and dorsum.

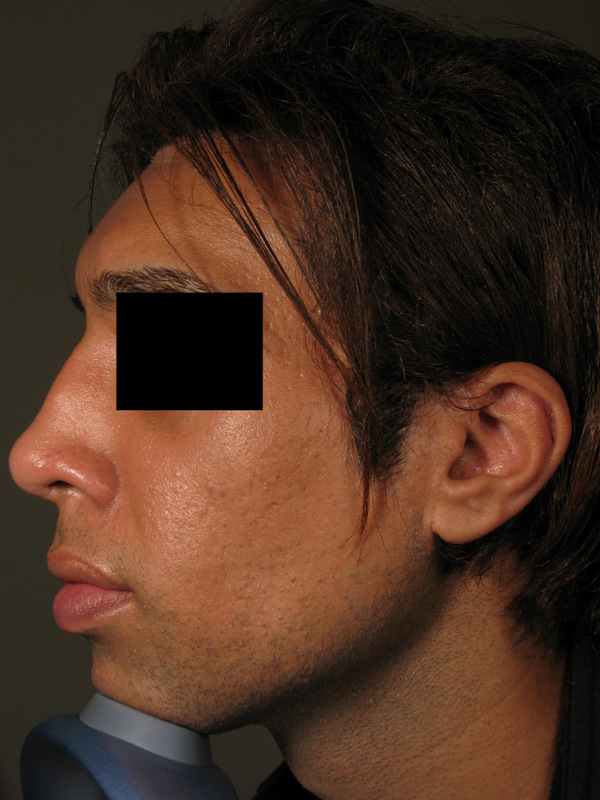
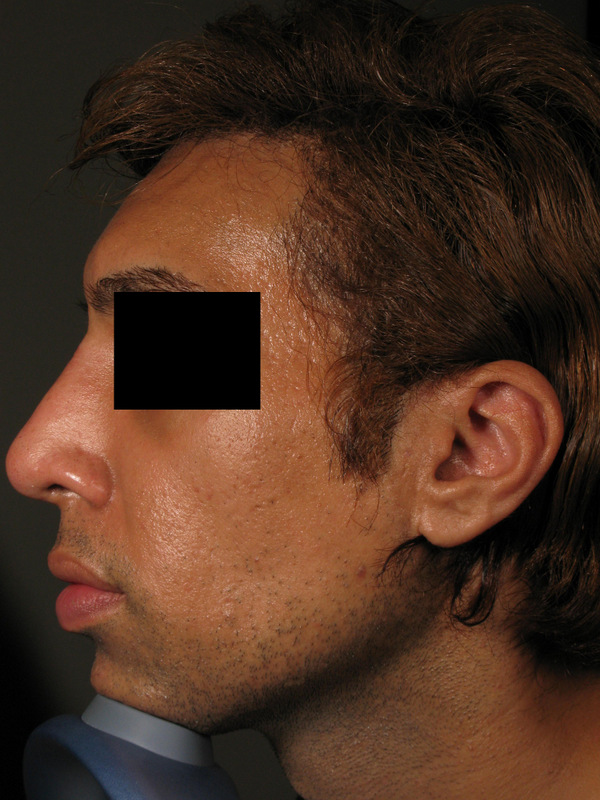
BEFORE AND AFTER: Bumpy nose (left photo) straightened with filler injection.
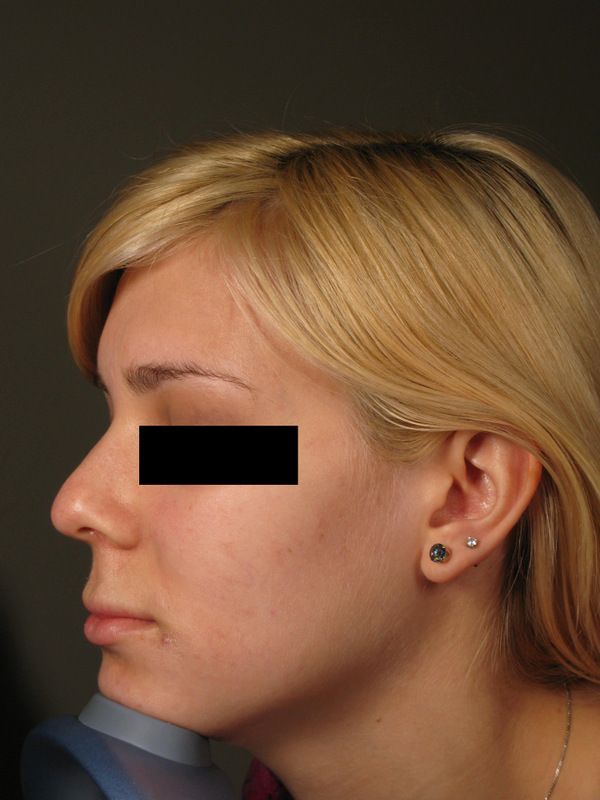
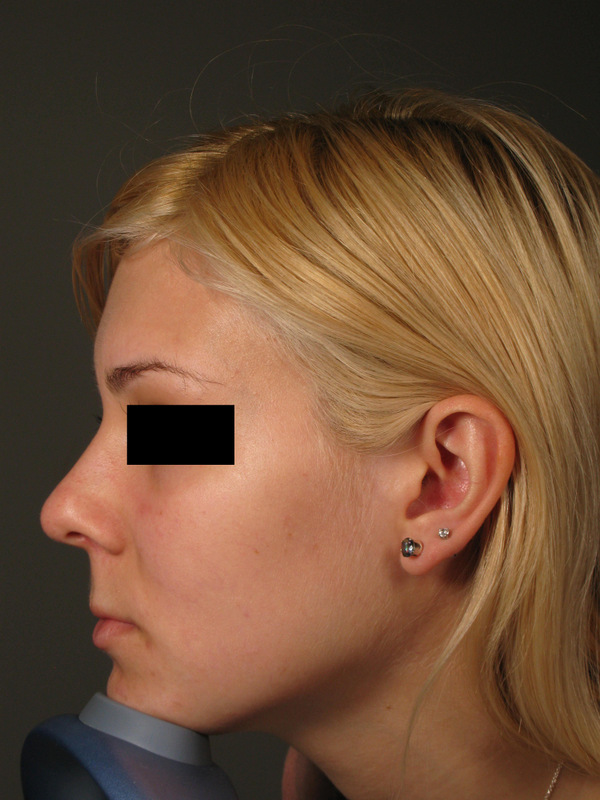
BEFORE AND AFTER: Droopy nasal tip (left photo) lifted with filler injection.

Because the nose is the anchor-feature of the face, an aesthetically proportionate nose balances the physiognomic features of a person. Non-surgical correction is considered for patients with a treatment-suitable aesthetic defect, or a defect resulting from a surgical rhinoplasty (either primary or secondary). Although the procedure is usually performed for aesthetic purposes, it can also be used to correct some birth defects. Because the procedure is not invasive, bruising and swelling are minimal. The procedure is not meant to decrease nose size, although it can make the nose appear smaller by making it look straighter. It is frequently used to increase the height and definition of the nasal bridge, as well as augmenting other precisely defined areas of the nose. The procedure is not used to correct functional defects. Non-surgical rhinoplasty is used by patients of all ethnicities.

The filler-injection technique allows for:

- the augmentation of a flat nasal bridge (depressed dorsum)
- the added projection of the nasal tip
- correction of retracted columella
- small reduction of nostril size
- the perceptual diminution of a nasal hump
- filling a nasal sidewall depression
- enhancing a retracted anterior nasal spine
- the enhancement of a retracted maxilla lateral to the pyriform (pear-shaped) aperture to displace the anterior plane
- the elevation of a saddle nose deformity caused by a failed primary rhinoplasty
- traumatic injury

As with other aesthetic procedures, possible complications of the procedure can include infection, hematoma, discomfort, anatomic asymmetry, or foreign body reaction (called granulomas). Granulomas are extremely rare, and are most seen with impure silicone and some of the early non-modern versions of methyl-methacrylate (Artecoll or Arteplast, though not Artefill).

== Modern fillers ==
Duration of results depends on the type of filler used. Modern injectable soft-tissue filler agents include:

- Calcium hydroxyapatite (Radiesse) – A calcium based, non allergenic filler that is sturdier than hyaluronic acid and lasts for 10 to 14 months. However, it is not reversible.
- Hyaluronic acid (Juvederm, Restylane, Perlane or Voluma) – low hypoallergenic temporary filler that lasts for 6 to 10 months. This filler can be dissolved with injections of an enzyme called hyaluronidase.
- Liquid silicone – Medical grade silicone is sometimes used in a microdroplet technique for permanent versions of the procedure.
- Polyacrylamide gel (PAAG or Aquamid) – A permanent filler used most frequently in Asia and Australia. Some studies have since found increased complications with Aquamid. It is not approved by the U.S. FDA.
- Polymethylmethacrylate (Artefill) – A permanent filler made from inert, microscopic surgical plastic beads. It is packaged with bovine collagen as a carrier, so a skin test is necessary prior to treatment. This filler is injected over several treatment sessions.

== Techniques ==
The preferred anesthesia for non surgical rhinoplasty is topical cream (topical anesthesia). Some physicians use local anaesthesia (i.e. lidocaine injections), but that can obscure the area being injected.

The physician injector uses a sterile syringe, prepackaged with filler and a hypodermic needle (e.g. 27-G, 25 mm) to inject the material under the nasal skin, most commonly in the deep subcutaneous tissues, immediately above the periosteum. Surgeons may also inject material in two planes, above and below the subperiosteal plane, for dorsal augmentation.

The procedure for injecting and placing the soft-tissue filler typically take 10 to 30 minutes to perform in the surgeon's consultation room, after an initial 15 minutes of numbing. After the procedure, the patient can typically resume normal life activities immediately. Results are immediate and lasts up to 15–18 months depending on the filler type.

== See also ==
- Cosmetic surgery
- History of rhinoplasty
