= Oral and maxillofacial surgery =

Surgical treatment

- System: Head, neck, face, jaws, hard and soft tissues of the oral and maxillofacial region
- Specialist: Oral and maxillofacial surgeon
- Glossary: Glossary of medicine

Oral and maxillofacial surgery (OMFS) is a surgical speciality focusing on reconstructive surgery of the face, facial trauma surgery, the mouth, head and neck, and jaws, as well as facial plastic surgery including cleft lip and cleft palate surgery and rhinoplasty.

== Specialty ==
An oral and maxillofacial surgeon is a specialist surgeon who treats the entire craniomaxillofacial complex: anatomical area of the mouth, jaws, face, and skull, head and neck as well as associated structures. Depending upon the national jurisdiction, oral and maxillofacial surgery may require a degree in medicine, dentistry or both.

=== United States ===
In the US, oral and maxillofacial surgeons, whether possessing a single or dual degree, may further specialise after residency, undergoing additional one or two year sub-specialty oral and maxillofacial surgery fellowship training in the following areas:

- Cosmetic facial surgery, including eyelid (blepharoplasty), nose (rhinoplasty), facial lift, brow lift, and laser resurfacing
- Cranio-maxillofacial trauma, including zygomatic (cheek bone), orbital (eye socket), mandibular and nasal fractures as well as facial soft tissue lacerations and penetrating neck injuries
- Craniofacial surgery/paediatric maxillofacial surgery, including cleft lip and palate surgery and trans-cranial craniofacial surgery including Fronto-Orbital Advancement and Remodelling (FOAR) and total vault remodelling
- Head and neck cancer and microvascular reconstruction free flap surgery
- Maxillofacial regeneration, which is re-formation of the facial region by advanced stem-cell technique

=== United Kingdom and Europe ===
In countries such as the UK and most of Europe, it is recognised as a specialty of medicine with a degree in medicine and an additional degree in dentistry being compulsory. The scope of practice is mainly head and neck cancer, microvascular reconstruction, craniofacial surgery and cranio-maxillofacial trauma, skin cancer, facial deformity, cleft lip and palate, craniofacial surgery, TMJ surgery and cosmetic facial surgery.

In the UK, maxillofacial surgery is a speciality of the Royal College of Surgeons of England, and the Royal College of Surgeons of Edinburgh. Intercollegiate Board Certification is provided through the JCIE, and is the same as plastic surgery, ENT, general surgery, orthopaedics, paediatric surgery, neurosurgery and cardiothoracic surgery.

The FRCS (Fellowship of the Royal College of Surgeons) is the specialist exam at the end of surgical training, and is required to work as a Consultant Surgeon in maxillofacial surgery.

In the EU, OMFS is defined within Directive 2005/36 on professional qualifications (updated 2021). The two OMFS specialties are 'dual degree' dental, oral, and maxillofacial surgery (DOMFS) and 'single medical degree' maxillofacial surgery (MFS). In some cases a dental degree may be required to enter speciality training but in all cases the medical degree must be obtained before starting OMFS speciality training.

In Poland, maxillofacial surgery has always been dominated by dentists and still the majority of current OMFS trainees are dental graduates.

Since 2019, Norway switched from dual degree requirement for maxillofacial surgery to medical degree only. Similarly, Sweden has started several maxillofacial surgery training programs for medical graduates.

=== Canada and Asia ===
In Asia, oral and maxillofacial surgery is also recognised as a dental speciality and requires a degree in dentistry prior to surgical residency training. The Canadian model is the same as the model used in the United States.

=== Pakistan ===
In Pakistan, OMFS is recognised as a speciality of dentistry which requires FCPS from CPSP after 4 years BDS degree and a one-year housejob. The candidate has to pass FCPS-1 in order to commence their training followed by PGMI Exam (not in all cases).

=== India ===
Oral and maxillofacial surgery, also known as OMFS, is a branch recognised by DCI (Dental Council of India). Becoming a maxillofacial surgeon requires a five-year dental degree followed by three years of post-graduate specialisation. Oral and maxillofacial surgery includes the treatment of complex dental surgery, including wisdom tooth removal, dental implant, craniomaxillofacial trauma, orofacial pain (trigeminal neuralgia) and jaw joint pain (temporomandibular disorder) management, jaw joint replacement for ankylosis and deformed jaw joint cases, Lefort-3 distraction for craniosynostosis case, jaw tumour and cyst removal surgery, head and neck cancer, facial aesthetic like rhinoplasty, eye and ear plastic surgery, facial cosmetic surgery, microvascular surgery, and cleft and craniomaxillofacial surgery. A maxillofacial surgeon is considered one of the required members of an emergency team. Almost 20-25% of trauma patients usually have sustained facial trauma, and that needs urgent opinion and primary management that can be better managed by maxillofacial experts.

=== Australia and New Zealand ===
In Australia and New Zealand, oral and maxillofacial surgery is recognised as both a speciality of medicine and dentistry. Degrees in both medicine and dentistry are compulsory prior to being accepted for surgical training. The scope of practice is broad and there is the ability to undertake subspecialty fellowships in areas such as head and neck surgery and microvascular reconstruction.

=== Globally ===
In other countries, oral and maxillofacial surgery as a speciality exists but under different forms, as the work is sometimes performed by a single or dual qualified specialist depending on each country's regulations and training opportunities available. In several countries, oral and maxillofacial surgery is a speciality recognised by a professional association, as is the case with the Dental Council of India, American Dental Association, Royal College of Surgeons of England, Royal College of Surgeons of Edinburgh, Royal College of Dentists of Canada, Royal Australasian College of Surgeons and Brazilian Federal Council of Odontology (CFO).

== Regulation in the United States ==
Oral and maxillofacial surgery is an internationally recognised surgical speciality. Oral and maxillofacial surgery is formally designated as either a medical, dental or dual (medical and dental) speciality.

In the United States, oral and maxillofacial surgery is a recognised surgical speciality, formally designated as a dental speciality. A professional dental degree is required, a qualification in medicine may be undertaken optionally during residency training. In this respect, oral and maxillofacial surgery is sui generis among surgical specialties. Board certification in the US is governed by the American Board of Oral and Maxillofacial Surgery (ABOMS). Oral and maxillofacial surgery is among the fourteen surgical specialties recognised by the American College of Surgeons. Oral and maxillofacial surgeons in the United States, whether single or dual degree, may become Fellows of the American College of Surgeons, "FACS" (Fellow, American College of Surgeons).

The American Association of Oral and Maxillofacial Surgeons (AAOMS) is the chief professional organisation representing the roughly 9,000 oral and maxillofacial surgeons in the United States. The American Association of Oral and Maxillofacial Surgeons publishes the peer-reviewed Journal of Oral and Maxillofacial Surgery.

== Surgical procedures ==
Globally, treatments may be performed on the craniomaxillofacial complex: mouth, jaws, face, neck, and skull, and include:

- Cosmetic surgery of the head and neck: (rhytidectomy/facelift, browlift, blepharoplasty/Asian blepharoplasty, otoplasty, rhinoplasty, septoplasty, cheek augmentation, chin augmentation, genioplasty, oculoplastics, neck liposuction, hair transplantation, lip enhancement, injectable cosmetic treatments like botox, fillers, platelet rich plasma, stem cells, chemical peel, mesotherapy.
- Orthognathic surgery, surgical treatment/correction of dentofacial deformity as well as management of facial trauma, and sleep apnea
- Oncology head and neck surgery with free flap microvascular reconstruction
- Cutanous malignancy/skin cancer surgery of head and neck surgery skin grafts and local flaps
- Diagnosis and treatment of:
- benign pathology (cysts, tumours etc.)
- malignant pathology (oral & head and neck cancer) with (ablative and reconstructive surgery, microsurgery)
- cutaneous malignancy (skin cancer), lip reconstruction
- congenital craniofacial malformations such as cleft lip and palate and cranial vault malformations such as craniosynostosis, (craniofacial surgery)
- chronic facial pain disorders
- temporomandibular joint (TMJ) disorders
- Orthognathic (literally "straight jaw") reconstructive surgery, orthognathic surgery, maxillomandibular advancement, surgical correction of facial asymmetry.
- soft and hard tissue trauma of the oral and maxillofacial region (jaw fractures, cheek bone fractures, nasal fractures, LeFort fracture, skull fractures and eye socket fractures).
- Dentoalveolar surgery (surgery to remove impacted teeth, difficult tooth extractions, extractions on medically compromised patients, bone grafting or preprosthetic surgery to provide better anatomy for the placement of implants, dentures, or other dental prostheses)
- Surgery to insert osseointegrated (bone fused) dental implants and maxillofacial implants for attaching craniofacial prostheses and bone anchored hearing aids.

== Occupation ==
Oral and maxillofacial surgery is intellectually and physically demanding and is among the most highly compensated surgical specialties in the United States, with a 2008 average annual income of $568,968.

The popularity of oral and maxillofacial surgery as a career for persons whose first degree was medicine, not dentistry, seems to be increasing. At least one program (University of Alabama at Birmingham) exists that allows highly qualified candidates whose first degree is in medicine to earn the required dental degree, so as to qualify for entrance into oral and maxillofacial residency training programs and ultimately achieve board eligibility and certification in the surgical speciality.

== Education and training ==
In the UK, oral and maxillofacial surgery is one of the ten medical specialties, requiring MRCS and FRCS examinations.

In mainland Europe, its status, including whether or not oral surgery, maxillofacial surgery, and stomatology are considered separate specialties, varies by country. The required qualifications (medical degree, dental degree, or both, as well as the required internship and residency programs) also vary.

In the US, Australia and South Africa, oral and maxillofacial surgery is one of the ten dental specialties recognised by the American Dental Association, Royal College of Dentists of Canada, and the Royal Australasian College of Dental Surgeons. Oral and maxillofacial surgery requires four to six years of further formal university training after dental school (i.e., DDS, BDent, DMD, or BDS).

Residency training programs are either four or six years in duration. In the United States, four-year residency programs grant a certificate of speciality training in oral and maxillofacial surgery. Six-year programs granting an optional MD degree emerged in the early 1990s in the United States. Typically, six-year residency programs grant the speciality certificate and an additional degree such as a medical degree (e.g., MD, DO, MBBS, MBChB) or research degree (e.g., MS, MSc, MPhil, MDS, MSD, MDSc, DClinDent, DSc, DMSc, PhD). Both four– and six–year graduates are designated US "board eligible" and those who earn "board certification" are diplomats. Approximately 50% of the training programs in the US and 66% of Canadian training programs are "dual-degree." The typical length of education and training, in post-secondary school is 12 to 14 years. Beyond these years, some sub-specialise, adding an additional 1-2 year fellowship.

The typical training program for an oral and maxillofacial surgeon is:

- 2–4 years of undergraduate study (BS, BA, or equivalent degrees)
- 4 years dental study (DMD, BDent, DDS or BDS)
- 4–6 years residency training – Some programs integrate an additional degree such as a master's degree (MS, MDS, MSc, MClinDent, MScDent, MDent), doctoral degree (PhD, DMSc, DClinDent, DSc), or medical degree (e.g., MBBS, MD, DO, MBChB, MDCM)
- After completion of surgical training most undertake final speciality examinations: US: "Board Certified (ABOMS)", Australia/NZ: FRACDS, or Canada: "FRCDC"
- Some colleges offer membership or fellowships in oral/maxillofacial surgery: MOralSurg RCS, M(OMS) RCPS, FFD RCSI, FEBOS, FACOMS, FFD RCS, FAMS, FCDSHK, FCMFOS (SA)
- Both single and dual qualified oral and maxillofacial surgeons may obtain fellowship with the American College of Surgeons (FACS).

=== Surgical sub-specialty fellowship training ===
In addition, single and dual-qualified graduates of oral and maxillofacial surgery training programs can pursue post-residency sub-specialty fellowships, typically 1–2 years in length, in the following areas:

- Head and neck cancer – microvascular reconstruction
- Cosmetic facial surgery (facelift, rhinoplasty, etc.)
- Craniofacial surgery and paediatric maxillofacial surgery (cleft lip and palate repair, surgery for craniosynostosis, etc.)
- Cranio-maxillofacial trauma (soft tissue and skeletal injuries to the face, head and neck)

== Charities ==
Several notable philanthropic organisations provide humanitarian oral and maxillofacial surgery globally. Smile Train was created in 1998 by Charles Wang focusing on childhood facial deformity. Operation Smile focuses on correcting cleft lips and palates in children. AboutFace, created by Paul Stanley, of the rock band KISS, who was born with a facial deformity, focuses on craniofacial disfiguration.

== See also ==
- Cosmetic surgery – Medical surgical specialty
- Orthognathic surgery – Surgery of the jaw
- Oral and maxillofacial pathology
- Head and neck cancer – Cancer arises in the head or neck region
- Oral cancer – Cancer of the lining of the lips, mouth, or upper throat
- Dental trauma – Injury to the teeth or surrounding tissues
- Dental implant – Surgical component that interfaces with the bone of the jaw
- Craniofacial surgery – Surgical treatment
- Cranio-maxillofacial trauma
- Anaesthesia – State of medically-controlled temporary loss of sensation or awareness
- Temporomandibular joint dysfunction – Disorders of the muscles and joints connecting the jaw to the skull
- Dentoalveolar – Region of jaw bones containing tooth sockets surgery
- Rhytidectomy – Type of cosmetic surgery
- Botox – Neurotoxin produced by Clostridium botulinum
- Blepharoplasty – Surgical modification of the eyelids
- Asian blepharoplasty – Cosmetic surgery for creating an eyelid crease
- Rhinoplasty – Surgical procedure to enhance or reconstruct a human nose
- Cheek augmentation – Cosmetic procedure intended to emphasize a person's cheeks and chin augmentation – Plastic surgery technique
- Oral medicine – Medicine pertaining to the mouth
- Otorhinolaryngology – Medical specialty of the head and neck
- Plastic surgery – Medical surgical specialty
- Ophthalmology – Field of medicine treating eye disorders
