= Cheek augmentation =

Cosmetic procedure intended to emphasize a person's cheeks

Cheek augmentation is a cosmetic surgical procedure that is intended to emphasize the cheeks on a person's face. To augment the cheeks, a plastic surgeon may place a solid implant over the cheekbone. Injections with the patients' own fat or an injectable filler are possible. Rarely, various cuts to the zygomatic bone (cheekbone) may be performed. Cheek augmentation is commonly combined with other procedures, such as a face lift or chin augmentation.

== Implants ==
=== Materials ===
Cheek implants can be made of a variety of materials. The most common material is solid silicone. In addition, two popular options are high-density porous polyethylene, marketed as Medpor, and ePTFE (expanded polytetrafluoroethylene), better known as Gore-Tex. Both Medpor and ePTFE are inert substances, providing better integration with the underlying tissue and bone than solid silicone. However, in the case of Medpor, the implants' integration and ingrowth with the underlying tissue causes difficulty removing the implant if revisions are needed.

=== Shapes ===
There are three general shapes to cheek implants: malar, submalar, or combined. Malar implants, the most common shape, are placed directly on the cheekbones. The result is more projection to the cheekbones, providing a "higher" contour to the side of the face. In contrast, submalar implants are not placed on the cheekbones. They are intended to augment the midface, especially if the person has a gaunt or "sunken" appearance to this area. Combined implants or malar/submalar combination, are an extended implant intended to augment both the midface and the cheekbones.

=== Incisions ===
A surgeon will usually make an incision in the upper mouth near the top of the gum line and slide the implants into place. Another method is to make an external incision near the eye, but most patients do not choose this method since it can create a visible scar. However, the intraoral (inside the mouth) approach carries a higher risk of infection since the mouth contains more bacteria. Cheek implant surgery is usually performed under sedation or general anesthesia and take about one to two hours. Recovery from this surgery usually takes about ten days.

=== Risks ===
As with any surgery there is a risk of infection, postoperative bleeding, formation of a blood clot, and severe swelling. Asymmetry is a risk with all forms of cheek augmentation. This can occur due to uneven resorption, implant displacement, or shifting. This shift can happen due to swelling, trauma or scarring. Although a temporary loss of sensation is common, an extended loss of sensation can occur with any surgery, especially cosmetic plastic surgery.

== Fillers or injections ==
Injections to the cheekbones to provide a less invasive and less expensive approach to cheek augmentation. A hyaluronic acid, such as Restylane or Juvederm, can be injected to the cheek area. Autologous fat is considered a "more permanent" option, but all are eventually completely resorbed.

== Zygomatic osteotomy ==
A zygomatic "sandwich" osteotomy is far less common. The procedure is often indicated during reconstructive surgery for birth defects or traumatic injury. During this procedure, the zygoma, or cheekbone, is separated by bone cuts near the orbital rim and maxilla. The bone is then moved outward and a solid material, such as hydroxylapatite, is wedged in place to hold the new position of the zygoma.
