= Aquamid =

Injectable cosmetic filler

Aquamid is a non-absorbable soft volume filler for aesthetic and reconstructive purposes. Aquamid is the trade name for a specific formulation of 97.5% water for injection and 2.5% cross-linked polyacrylamide. It is injected subcutaneously to correct wrinkles and folds or to add volume. Common aesthetic indications are nasolabial folds, lip augmentation, cheek contouring, nose enhancement. Aquamid is also used to correct signs of facial lipoatrophy or fat wasting in HIV+ patients.

Aquamid has been evaluated in several clinical trials involving more than 5,000 patients including a comparative trial in the United States. Data from this trial has been used to support a PMA application to the FDA. Aquamid is not yet approved for sale in the United States.

Aquamid is developed, produced and commercialized by Contura International. It was approved in Europe in 2001 for facial augmentation and minor body contouring and is available in several countries in Europe, Asia, the Middle East and Latin America.
