= Lip flip =

Cosmetic procedure

Lip flip is a cosmetic procedure that modifies the shape of the lips using botulinum neurotoxin type A and occasionally adding hyaluronic acid fillers. The procedure is performed in order to increase the size of the lips. The procedure typically involves injection of the neurotoxin along the vermilion border of the lips. This leads to a relaxation of the underlying muscle and eversion of the lip. Hyaluronic acid fillers are sometimes added in order to increase volume in the lips.

== Aesthetics ==
The aim of lip flip is to provide an aesthetic, symmetric, and healthy appearance for the patient.

== Materials and techniques ==
The primary agents used during the lip flip procedure include:

- Botulinum neurotoxin type A, is a neurotoxic protein produced by the bacterium Clostridium botulinum that temporarily reduces muscle contraction and is used for cosmetic purposes.
- Hyaluronic acid fillers
- Lip Flip is a nonsurgical cosmetic treatment. It is done to increase the volume of the upper lip and make it look fuller. A small amount of botulinum toxin ie; BOTOX® is injected around the corners of the lips to fill the volume.

== Non-surgical alternatives ==
- Lip plumper is a cosmetic product used to make lips appear fuller. These products work by irritating the skin of the lips with ingredients such as Capsaicin. This makes the lips swell, temporarily creating the appearance of fuller lips.
- Suction pumps, a special device for lips uses vacuum pumping to increase blood pressure in each lip and to pull them out a bit, making it quite an instrument to adjust proper lip length/value in a slow determinate step-by-step way.

== See also ==
- Lip lift
- Plastic surgery
