= Lip augmentation =

Cosmetic procedure

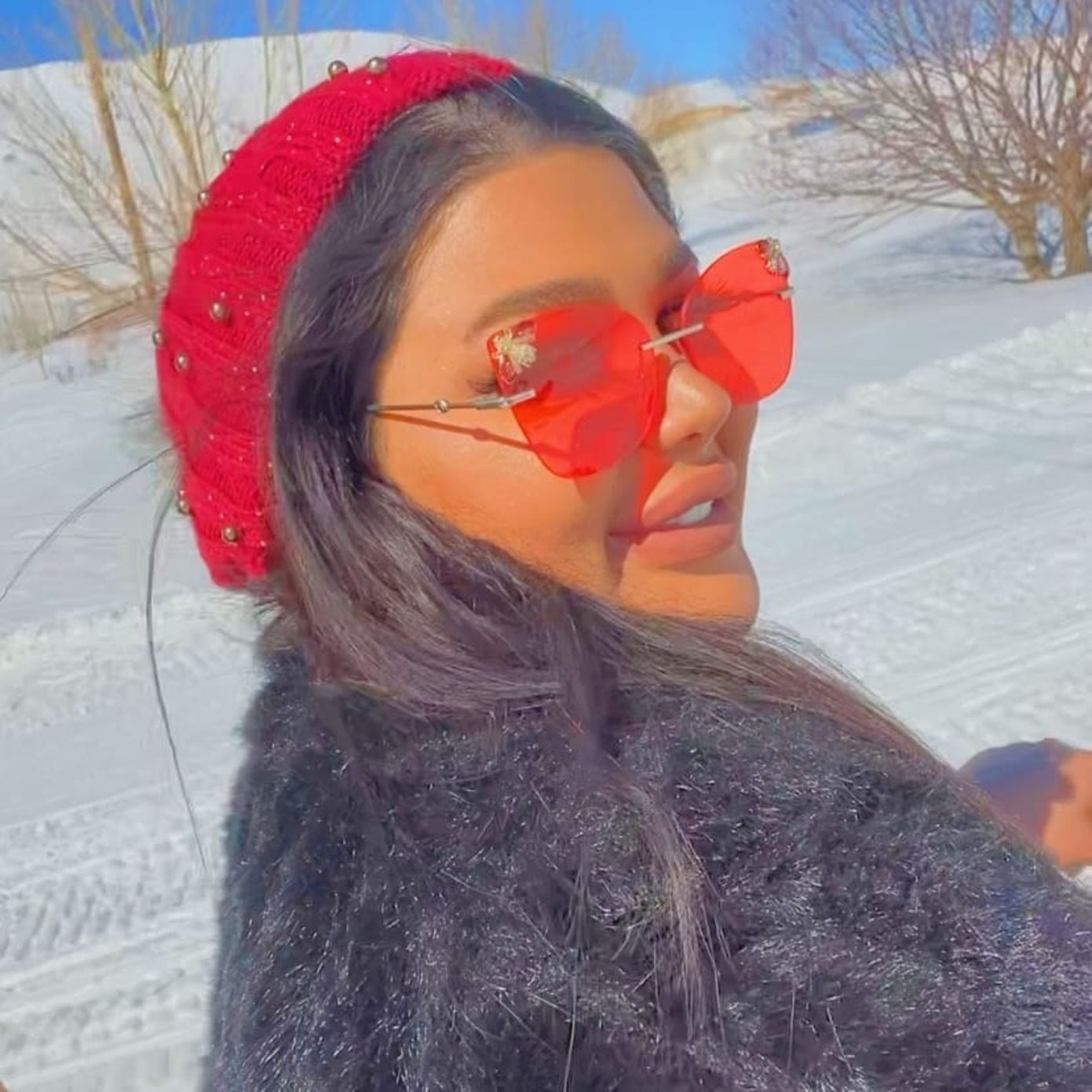
A woman showing typical lip augmentation

Lip augmentation is a cosmetic procedure that modifies the shape of the lips using fillers, such as collagen or implants. The procedure may be performed to increase lip size, correct asymmetry, create protrusion, or adjust the ratio of the top and bottom lips. The procedure typically involves surgical injection, though temporary non-surgical alternatives exist.

Swelling and bruising are common after lip augmentation, and irritation or allergic reactions may also occur. Lip augmentations can have undesired cosmetic effects, including scarring and lumping, and implants pose the risk of shifting underneath the lip or breaking through the skin.

== History ==
Around 1900, surgeons tried injecting paraffin into the lips without success. Liquid silicone was used for lip augmentation, starting in the early 1960s but was abandoned thirty years later due to fears about the effects of silicone on general health and long term aesthetic outcome. In about 1980, injectable bovine collagen was introduced to the cosmetic surgery market and became the standard against which other injectable fillers were measured. However, that collagen does not last very long and requires an allergy test, causing the patient to wait at least three weeks before another appointment, after which more waiting is required to see cosmetic results.

== Materials and techniques ==
In the late 1990s, with the huge popularity of surgical rejuvenation and the concomitant increase of cosmetic surgery procedures worldwide, more substances, along with biocompatible materials commonly used in other medical applications for years, became available to surgeons for use in augmenting thinning or misshapen lips into more plump and attractive features.

Some of the first widely used lip augmentation substances were:

- Autologen, an injectable dermal material made from the patient's own skin. No risk of allergy exists but the results are very temporary because the body quickly absorbs the material.
- Collagen requires an allergy test because the material is extracted from bovine hides. It lasts anywhere from four weeks to three months because it is also absorbed into the body. However, the allergy test must be observed for four weeks.
- Dermalogen is taken from the patient's skin—and through a laboratory process—made into a high concentration collagen that can be injected into the lips. Some studies indicate it lasts somewhat longer than collagen.
- Alloderm is donor tissue taken from cadavers and then denatured, purified and treated to remove viable cells that could pass along disease. Under a local anesthesia, Alloderm is placed into the mucosa, or body, of the lips in small rolls to make them larger. Alloderm can also be placed into the vermilion, the pink area of the lip, to provide definition and a sharper border.
- Radiance, a synthetic, laboratory produced solution containing calcium hydroxylapatite (bone) suspended in a gel that has been safely used in medicine for years. Some studies indicate Radiance can last between three and five years. One researcher (Tzikas) found in a study of Radiance on 90 patients that 59 percent felt when injected, moderate to severe pain which disappeared two to five minutes later. But the substance produced results for an average of two years with a few patients reporting the plumping effects being sustained as long as three to five years. Of the 90 patients, four required surgical intervention due to nodules in the lips.
- Gore-Tex implants. In medical uses, Gore-Tex is known as EPTFE, or expanded polytetrafluoroethylene and, commercially as Advanta, UltraSoft, and SoftForm. The EPTFE is delivered to surgeons in strips that are 1/16 inch (1.6 mm) and 3/16 inch (4.8 mm) diameter tubes.

== Current popular procedures ==
Since 2000, more products and techniques have been developed to make lip augmentation more effective and patient friendly. The relative ease of many injections is due to surgeons using tiny 30 and 31 gauge (about as thick as a dozen human hairs) needles that are used to inject the very sensitive lips. Nonetheless, topical anesthesias are often used for lip augmentation procedures.

Some of these new techniques and substances include:

- Fat transfer. Surgeons harvest through liposuction or excision the patient's fat from places on the body where it can be spared and either injected or surgically placed into the lips. Surgical applications usually require general anesthesia.
- Restylane, a non-animal, clear gel that is reported to be very close to the hyaluronic acid found naturally in the body. According to the American Society of Plastic Surgeons, there were 778,000 cases of Restylane injection in 2006, the most recent year for which statistics are available. The substance usually lasts six months and, sometimes, longer. While Juvederm is extremely chemically close to Restylane; many surgeons report the former is slightly smoother to inject. Juvederm contains 35 percent more cross-linked hyaluronic acid than Restylane, therefore it is claimed to be longer lasting (up to 1 or 1.5 year).
- Artecoll. Both Artecoll and ArteFill are not used to inject the body of the lips because the substance is heavy and would show as white through the thin skin of the lips. Additionally, both products contain tiny microspheres known as PMMA (polymethylmethacrylate) which remain in the face permanently. In cases where Artecoll has been used around the edges of the lips to remove fine lines and wrinkles, some patients have reported annoying nodules or small lumps. In a few cases, surgery was required to remove the Artecoll.

== Non-surgical alternatives ==
- Lip plumper is a cosmetic product used to make lips appear fuller. These products work by irritating the skin of the lips with ingredients such as capsaicin. This makes the lips swell, temporarily creating the appearance of fuller lips.
- Suction pumps, a device that uses vacuum pumping to increase blood pressure in the lips, causing temporary swelling.

== Risks and side effects ==
Several studies have found fat grafting of the lip to be one of the best methods of maintaining a semi-permanent fuller and softer lip. When the lips are overfilled, the results can be comic, often supplying fodder to tabloid newspapers and offbeat websites. This look is sometimes mockingly called a 'trout pout.' Overaggressive injections can lead to lumpiness while too little can result in ridges.

Common reactions can range from redness, swelling or itching at the injection site(s). Other possible complications include bleeding, uneven lips, movement of the implants, or extrusion, when an implant breaks through the outermost surface of the skin. Swelling and bruising can last from several days to a week.

Some patients are allergic to the common local anesthetics like lidocaine and probably should not consider lip injections. Some react badly to the skin test that patients must take before receiving collagen. Other patients who should forego procedures to the lip include those who have active skin conditions like cold sores, blood clotting problems, infections, scarring of the lips or certain diseases like diabetes or lupus that cause slower healing. Patients with facial nerve disorders, severe hypertension or recurrent herpes simplex lesions should also eschew lip augmentation. As in all surgeries, smokers complicate completion of their procedure as well as the speed of healing.

Fat transfer can last longer than other injected materials but can have lumping or scarring effects. The length of time a fat transfer may last in the lips is often determined by how much the area moves and how close it is to a major blood supply. In addition, the donor fat must be harvested from another area of the patient's body which leaves another—albeit tiny—surgical wound. However, donor fat harvesting techniques have become extremely well refined.

== Discussion ==
Cosmetic surgery providers often advise their patients that many options now exist for improving the appearance of the lips. Most practitioners also admit that successful lip augmentation is highly dependent on the skill of the provider, with that skill stemming from many years of experience injecting the lips of many types of patients. Moreover, the surgeon must master various injection techniques.

With many injectables, the benefit to the patient is an immediate return to normal, usual activities. A few surgeons offer a procedure known as surgical flap augmentations, in which small sections of skin near the lips or inside the mouth are excised and added to the lips. This technique does not add volume and achieves only a slight outward protrusion of the lips.

== See also ==
- Oral and maxillofacial surgery
- Otolaryngology
- Plastic surgery
- Lip lift
