= Mauricio de Maio =

Brazilian plastic surgeon

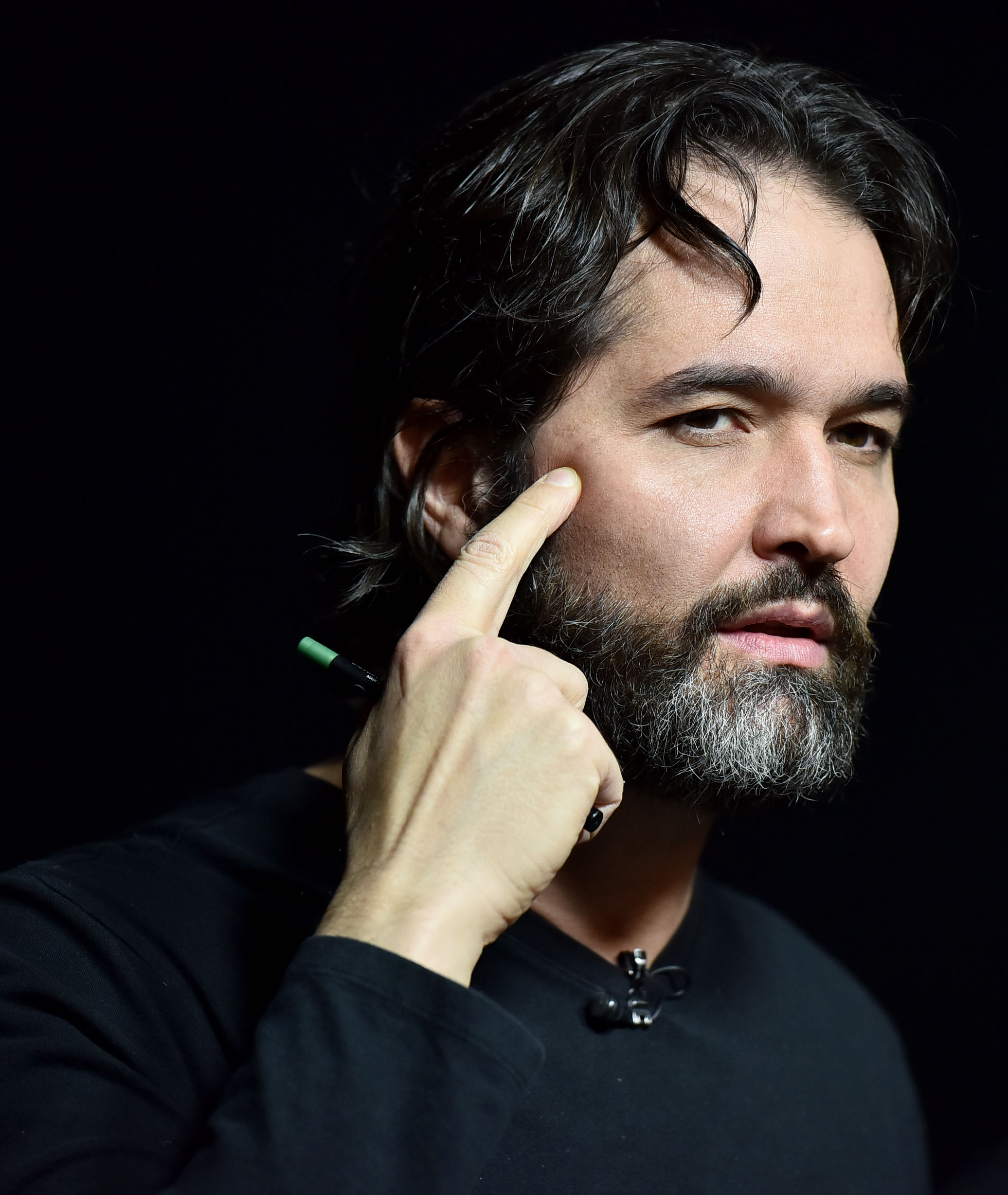
- de Maio in 2016
- Education: University of São Paulo

Mauricio de Maio is a Brazilian plastic surgeon who works with injectable fillers and botulinum toxin. He is the co-author of three textbooks on plastic surgery.

== Career ==
De Maio studied medicine at the Medical School of the University of São Paulo. After his residency in Plastic Surgery and clinical practice since 1996, he specialized in non-surgical procedures

De Maio developed a technique for using injectable fillers and botulinum toxin (Botox) for cosmetic procedures that he calls "the MD Codes". He has taught his technique in MD Codes Institute.

He is a member of the Brazilian Society of Aesthetics and Reconstructive Plastic Surgery since 1997 and active member of the International Society of Aesthetic Plastic Surgery (ISAPS) since 2004

== Textbooks ==
- Injectable Fillers in Aesthetic Medicine (Maio, Mauricio; Rzany, Berthold) - Springer-Verlag Berlin Heidelberg, 2006 and 2nd edition (2014). Published in English, Spanish, Portuguese and Korean. ISBN 978-3-642-45124-9
- The Male Patient in Aesthetic Medicine (Maio, Mauricio; Rzany, Berthold). Published in English. Publisher Springer-Verlag Berlin Heidleberg, 2009. ISBN 978-3-540-79045-7
- Botulinum Toxin in Aesthetic Medicine (Maio, Mauricio; Rzany, Berthold). Publisher - Springer-Verlag Berlin Heidelberg, 2007. Published in English, Spanish, Portuguese, Korean and Japanese. ISBN 978-3-540-34094-2
