= MBAM =

MBAM may refer to:

- Malwarebytes Anti-Malware, anti-malware software, as its former name
- Montreal Museum of Fine Arts, in Québec, Canada, an abbreviation for its French name, Musée des beaux-arts de Montréal

MBAm may refer to:

- N,N'-Methylenebisacrylamide, a chemical compound, polyacrylamide crosslinker
