= N,N'-Diallyl-L-tartardiamide =

Chemical compound, polyacrylamide crosslinker

DATD

Names
- Preferred IUPAC name (2R,3R)-2,3-dihydroxy-N,N'-bis(prop-2-enyl)butanediamide

Identifiers
CAS Number	58477-85-3
3D model (JSmol)	Interactive image
ChemSpider	88941
ECHA InfoCard	100.055.688
EC Number	261-277-3
PubChem CID	94074
CompTox Dashboard (EPA)	DTXSID60886266
- InChI: InChI=1S/C10H16N2O4/c1-3-5-11-9(15)7(13)8(14)10(16)12-6-4-2/h3-4,7-8,13-14H,1-2,5-6H2,(H,11,15)(H,12,16)/t7-,8-/m1/s1 Key: ZRKLEAHGBNDKHM-HTQZYQBOSA-N
- SMILES: C=CCNC(=O)C(C(C(=O)NCC=C)O)O

Properties
Chemical formula	C_{10}H_{16}N_{2}O_{4}
Molar mass	228.248 g·mol^{−1}
- Except where otherwise noted, data are given for materials in their standard state (at 25 °C [77 °F], 100 kPa). Infobox references

N,N′-Diallyl-L-tartardiamide (DATD) is a crosslinking agent for polyacrylamide gels, e.g., as used for SDS-PAGE. Compared to bisacrylamide gels, DATD gels have a stronger interaction with glass, and therefore are used in applications where the polyacrylamide gel acts as a "plug" structural component at the bottom of a gel electrophoresis apparatus, thereby preventing a weak discontinuous gel from sliding out from or otherwise moving within the apparatus. Unlike bisacrylamide-polyacrylamide gels, DATD-polyacrylamide gels can be conveniently dissolved using periodic acid due to the presence of viscinal diols in DATD. DATD is the slowest polyacrylamide crosslinker tested, and has can act as an inhibitor of polymerization at high concentrations.

== See also ==
- bisacrylamide
