= Test Tube Aliens =

Toy line

- Invented by: JKID Ltd
- Company: 4Kidz, Inc.

Test Tube Aliens are a series of toys that were invented by JKID Ltd and released by 4Kidz, Inc., a toy and juvenile products company based in Stamford, Connecticut.

== Story ==
There are 6 aliens available - three good, three bad. The three good aliens have escaped their dying home world of Naratuko in search of a new home. Using the technology of their ancestors, they were genetically reverted to a pre-birth state. They retain only their intelligence, their accumulated strength sacrificed for the greater good. They travelled across the universe in search of a sympathetic lifeform to restore them to adulthood and their former strength.

The evil aliens are responsible for the destruction of Naratuko, and have pursued the three good aliens across the universe, determined not to let their quarry escape for good.

== The toy itself ==
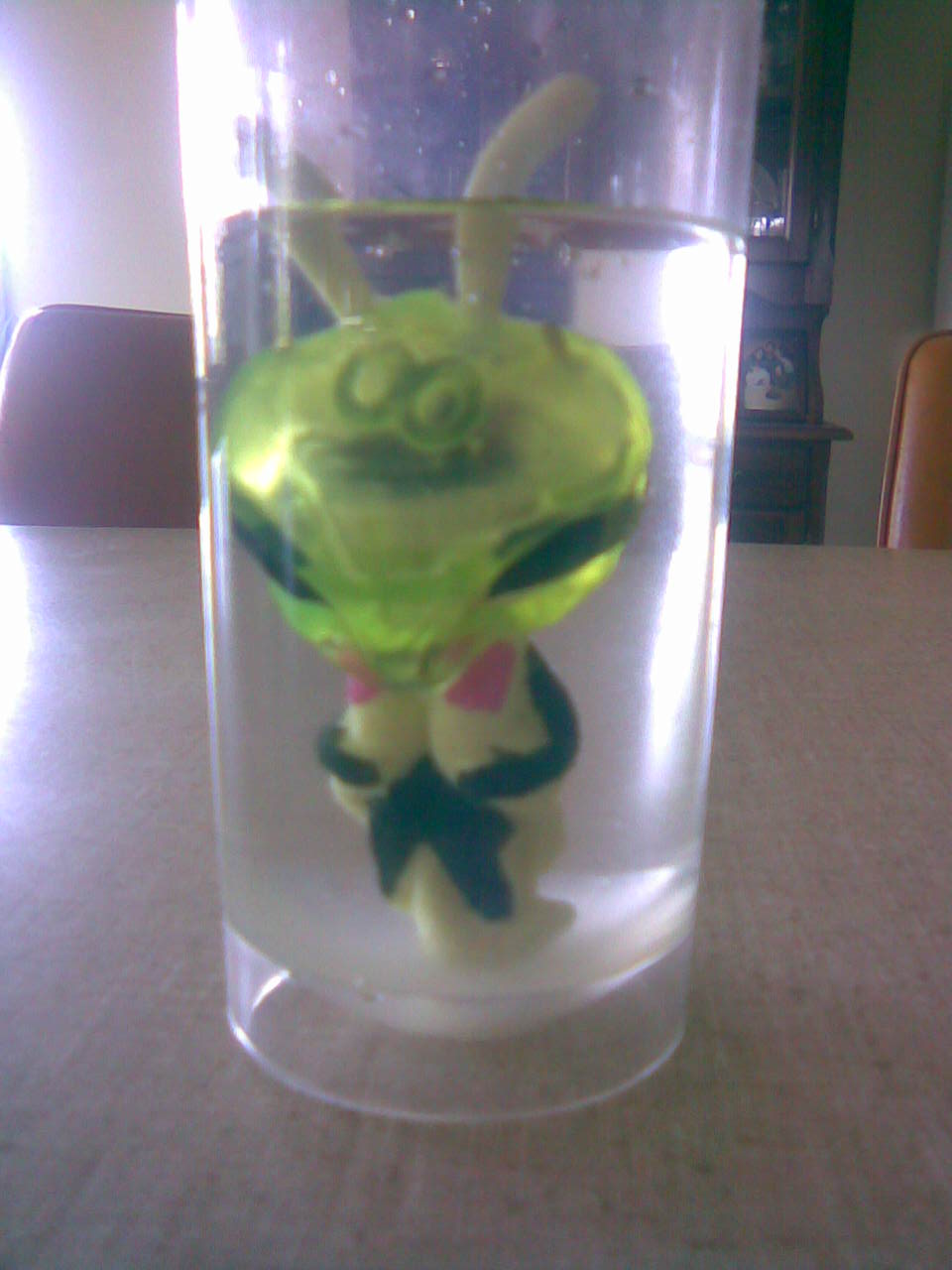
Kurion, a good alien in its infancy, having just hatched from its chrysalis.

The package contains a test tube, a clear plastic cylinder of around 18 centimetres in height and 6 centimetres in diameter. The alien is contained within a white cocoon, or 'chrysalis', inside the cylinder. By adding water the cocoon erodes, revealing an infant alien. The alien's heart (represented by a series of coloured flashes from the head) begins to beat, and the alien is 'alive'.

The alien must be fed for the first few days of its existence with 'Sloog', a white powder which is combined with water and poured into the test tube. After the feeding is complete, the alien will survive on plain tap water.

In order to remain 'healthy', the alien must be kept in twelve hours of daylight, and twelve hours of darkness each day. If left too long in the light, the alien's heartbeat will speed up. If left too long in darkness, the alien's heartbeat will become staggered and sporadic.

Similarly, the alien will detect if the water level is too high or low, and it will flash green (too high, drowning) or orange (too low, thirsty) to indicate this.

Eventually, if the alien is not treated right, it will die and the toy becomes useless. Some have been recorded to survive seven to nine months in total.

== How it works ==
The alien body contains Polyacrylamide, a polymer that soaks up water and causes the body to expand to up to eight times its original size. The "sloog" contains a weak acid that slows the expansion of the polymer so that the growth appears to occur over several days. The alien can sense the presence of the acid by measuring the solution's conductivity via electrodes on the tip of its antenna and on the top of its head. The electrodes also act to sense water level—the water level must be between the antenna electrode and the head electrodes for the alien to be `healthy'.

The website interaction works via a light detector in the alien's head responding to flashes from the 'web portal' on the Test Tube Aliens website. The light detector also lets the alien know how many hours it has been exposed to light and dark.
