= Restylane =

Injectable cosmetic filler

Restylane is the trade name for a range of injectable fillers with a specific formulation of hyaluronic acid (HA).

In the United States, Restylane was the first hyaluronic acid filler to be approved by the U.S. Food and Drug Administration (FDA) for cosmetic injection into subdermal facial tissues.

Restylane is produced by Galderma.

== Medical uses ==
Restylane is most commonly used for lip enhancement (volume and contouring). It is used to diminish wrinkles and aging lines of the face such as the nasolabial folds (nose to mouth lines) and melomental folds (sad mouth corners). It may also be used for filling aging-related facial hollows and "orbital troughs" (under and around the eyes), as well as for cheek volume and contouring of the chin, lips and nose.

== Side effects ==
A treatment with a dermal filler like Restylane can cause some temporary bruising in addition to swelling and numbness for a few days. In rare cases there has been reports of lumps or granulomas. These side effects can be easily reversed with a treatment of hyaluronidase, which is an enzyme that speeds up the natural degradation of the injected hyaluronic acid filler.

Several studies have been done to understand the long-term side effects of restylane and other hyaluronic acid fillers. In certain cases, the filler results in a granulomatous foreign body reaction.

Even though side effects are rare Restylane should not be used in or near areas where there is or has been skin disease, inflammation or related conditions. Restylane has not been tested in pregnant or breast-feeding women.

== Contraindications ==
Restylane dermal fillers are generally considered safe, there are certain contraindications and safety rules that online licensed providers should be aware of before buying and injecting Restylane fillers.

Contraindications for Restylane dermal fillers:

- Patients with a history of severe allergies or anaphylaxis should not receive Restylane fillers;
- Restylane fillers should not be used in patients who are allergic to hyaluronic acid or any of the other ingredients in the product;
- Patients with active infections or inflammation at the injection site should not receive Restylane fillers until the infection or inflammation has cleared up;
- Restylane fillers should not be used in patients who are pregnant or breastfeeding, as the safety of these products has not been established in these populations;
- Patients with bleeding disorders or taking blood-thinning medications should be closely monitored when receiving Restylane fillers.

== Treatment techniques ==
Most injectors inject the filler with a small needle under the skin. Numbing creams or injections decrease pain.

A new way to use Restylane was described in the August 2007 issue of the Journal of Drugs in Dermatology by Dutch cosmetic doctor Tom van Eijk, whose "fern pattern" injection technique aims to restore dermal elasticity rather than to fill underneath the wrinkles.

== Advantages ==
Mimic wrinkles are inextricably linked to the skin and affect the formation of fine wrinkles. Muscles woven into the dermis, contracting, tighten the skin, which provides mimic facial mobility. Their constant movement stretches the skin and leads to its sagging. This drug helps to restore weakened tissue and increase its volume without external damage.
