= Artefill =

Injectable wrinkle filler

Artefill is a permanent injectable wrinkle filler, for the correction of smile lines. Artefill was approved by the U.S. Food and Drug Administration (FDA) as a medical device in October 2006. A prior version of the product called Artecoll has been marketed in Canada and Europe since the 1990s.

== Medical use ==
Artecoll is a gel suspension of 20% polymethylmethacrylate (PMMA) 30- to 42-micron microspheres, 3.5% collagen derived from cows, and 0.3% lidocaine. The PMMA microspheres in Artecoll are not absorbed by the body and therefore provide a permanent scaffold into which the person's own soft tissue can grow; the PMMA microspheres can only be removed by cutting them out.

Artecoll is a permanent injectable wrinkle filler used by dermatologists and plastic surgeons to fill smile lines. The initial correction lasts about six months, until the bovine collagen degrades, but as the recipient's tissue grows in, filling may last for about five years and there have been reports of ten years' duration.

== Side effects ==
Side effects may include lumpiness at the injection site, persistent swelling or redness, increased sensitivity, and rash or itching more than 48 hours after injection. The lumpiness (nodules), and granulomas, can be difficult for doctors to treat.

If the recipient has allergies to bovine collagen or lidocaine, severe allergies, a susceptibility to form keloid or hypertrophic scars, or fails a small skin test, Artefill should not be used. Because the device ultimately works by causing tissue to grow around the microsphere scaffold, there is a risk of overgrowth if too much Artefill is administered.

== History ==
The product was invented by German plastic surgeon Gottfried Lemperle and the first version was called Arteplast and clinical trials started in 1989. An unacceptable rate of complications led to a new formulation, Artecoll, for which the Dutch company Rofil Medical received European marketing approval in 1994 and for which Canderm Pharma received Canadian approval in 1996. Artes Medical Inc. was formed in the US in 1999 by Lemperle and his two sons to bring the technology to the U.S. and secure FDA approval.
