= Juvéderm =

Injectable cosmetic filler

Juvéderm (/ˈdʒuːvɪdɜːrm/), an injectable filler (injectable facial filler), is used by cosmetic, dermatological, and plastic surgeons to soften deep folds and reduce wrinkles in the faces of patients. The substance is largely hyaluronic acid, a substance normally found in the skin, muscles, and tendons of mammals. Approved in June 2006 by the U.S. Food and Drug Administration, Juvéderm’s prime use is removing nasolabial folds, or “smile lines,” creases of skin which run from the corners of the nose to the corners of the mouth. It is also used as a lip augmentation agent, and to fill in hollow places and scars on the face. However, all hyaluronic acid facial filler products are eventually absorbed by the body, usually within six to nine months, requiring the patient to undergo repeat injections to maintain the younger look. Juvéderm is also used by physicians to plump lips, which also lose fat and internal shape with normal aging.

== FDA testing ==
Before being released onto the U.S. market, Juvéderm was compared with Zyplast dermal filler, a bovine-based injectable facial filler made from collagen. In clinical studies conducted at several U.S. medical centers to evaluate safety and efficacy, or effectiveness, 146 subjects were followed for 24 weeks. The subjects had Juvéderm injected into one nasolabial fold and Zyplast in the other. Using scientific measuring scales, Juvéderm was deemed to provide a more persistent correction in the subjects’ facial folds. At the end of the study, the researchers asked subjects to judge which fold looked better to them. Eighty-eight percent chose the area treated with Juvéderm. Before FDA approval, two other clinical studies on Juvéderm were done on a total of 293 subjects in the United States. The safety profile and effectiveness was found to be similar to the first test.

== History ==
In 1934, medical researchers Karl Meyer and John Palmer, scientists at Columbia University in New York, found that one of the chief functions of hyaluronic acid is maintaining skin volume and hydration, along with other body maintenance functions and tasks.

Meyer and Palmer first isolated the substance from the eye of a cow and named hyaluronic acid by combining the Greek word for glass—hyalos—and the uronic sugar contained in hyaluronic acid.

Hyaluronic acid later found uses in the baking and food industry in the 1940s and, by the 1990s, found its way into the medical field for use in joint pain, treating wounds, eye surgery and, finally, in 1996, for facial tissue augmentation in Europe.

== Current usage ==
Juvéderm’s current competitive edge in cosmetic surgery is possible because, according to the manufacturers, Juvéderm is “cross linked.” In hyaluronic acid’s natural form, the substance is a liquid which the body metabolizes in about half a day. Cross linking is a process which chemically binds the individual chains of the acid so it is changed into a gel which lasts much longer once injected inside the face.

Several other facial fillers used in Europe and the U.S. — such as Restylane, Belotero and Hylaform —are also cross-linked, with competition driving the other fillers toward even more highly cross linked compounds, according to Professor Berthold Rzany, professor of dermatology at the Charité Universitätsmedizin Berlin Germany.

== Mechanism of action ==
Juvéderm works well for cosmetic and plastic surgery applications because hyaluronic acid can absorb up to 1,000 times its own weight in water, thereby adding new volume under the surface of sagging skin. Older faces take on more youthful aspects because hyaluronic acid is known to bind with collagen—the material that supports human facial skin—and elastin to move more basic nutrients into the skin. Juvederm hydrates the skin and increases the capacity of skin to hold water therefore skin holds more moisture and looks fresher than before.

== Side effects ==
Patients, physicians and researchers say usual, expected side effects include; temporary redness, pain and tenderness during injections and swelling and bruising at the injection sites. The more serious side effects include: immune system reactions which result in facial lumps and bumps known as granulomas, bothersome reactions which are very difficult for physicians to treat. According to Allergan, Juvéderm should not be used in patients with severe allergies, particularly those who have allergies to bacterial proteins or patients with a history of anaphylaxis, which is a potentially life-threatening hypersensitivity to some drugs and proteins.
