= Lip lift =

Plastic surgery procedure

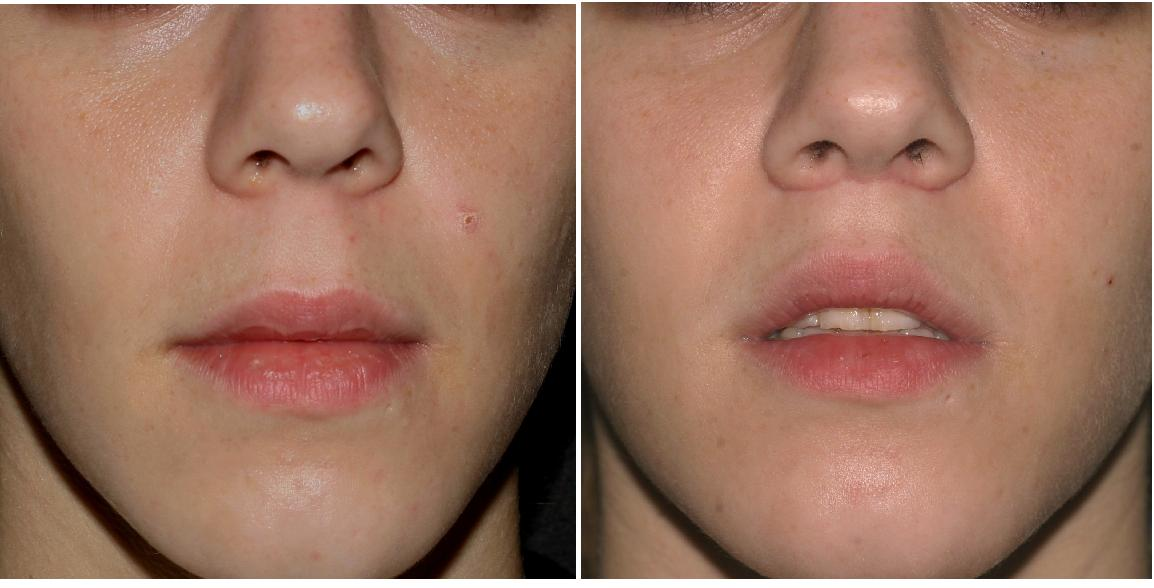
Lip lift: the post-operative aspect (left), and the pre-operative aspect (right) of surgically modified lips. The vermilion border is noticeably more defined in post-operative aspect.

A lip lift is the most common plastic surgery procedure that modifies the cosmetic appearance of the lips, by reshaping them to increase the prominence of the vermilion border and to alter the facial area above the lips into a different shape. In corrective praxis, a lip lift procedure is distinguished from lip enhancement, the augmentation of the lips, which can be affected with a non-surgical procedure.

== Background ==
=== Techniques ===
There are surgical and non-surgical techniques for effecting lip lift and lip augmentation to the lips. The surgical techniques include incisions below the nose and in the periphery of the lips area of the face, the perioral area; other techniques effect the surgical incisions from inside the mouth.

=== Surgical aesthetics ===
The aesthetic ideal of a mouth with youthful lips—shaped like a lozenge—features an upper lip with a pronounced Cupid's bow, and much fullness to each lip; however, such an ideal physiognomy declines with age, and the lips shrink and lose anatomic definition, as the lips sag, which affects the aesthetics of the smile, by revealing less of the teeth during a relaxed smile. The American Society of Plastic Surgeons reported 3.2 million cosmetic surgery procedures performed to mature patients aged 55 years and older, in 2008. The patient demand for facial rejuvenation indicates that most requests do not include the mouth, which results in a surgical outcome that is aesthetically deficient. In the 1980s, when collagen, originally the principal filler for the lips, proved limited in effecting permanent correction, plastic surgeons then developed surgical techniques for lifting and augmenting the lips, and correcting aesthetic defects and deformities.

== Surgical procedures ==
A systematic review regarding "non-filling" procedures for lip augmentation classified lip lift techniques in four surgical categories: the direct lip lift (DLL), indirect lip lift (ILL), corner of the mouth lift (CML), and the V–Y lip advancement (VYLA).

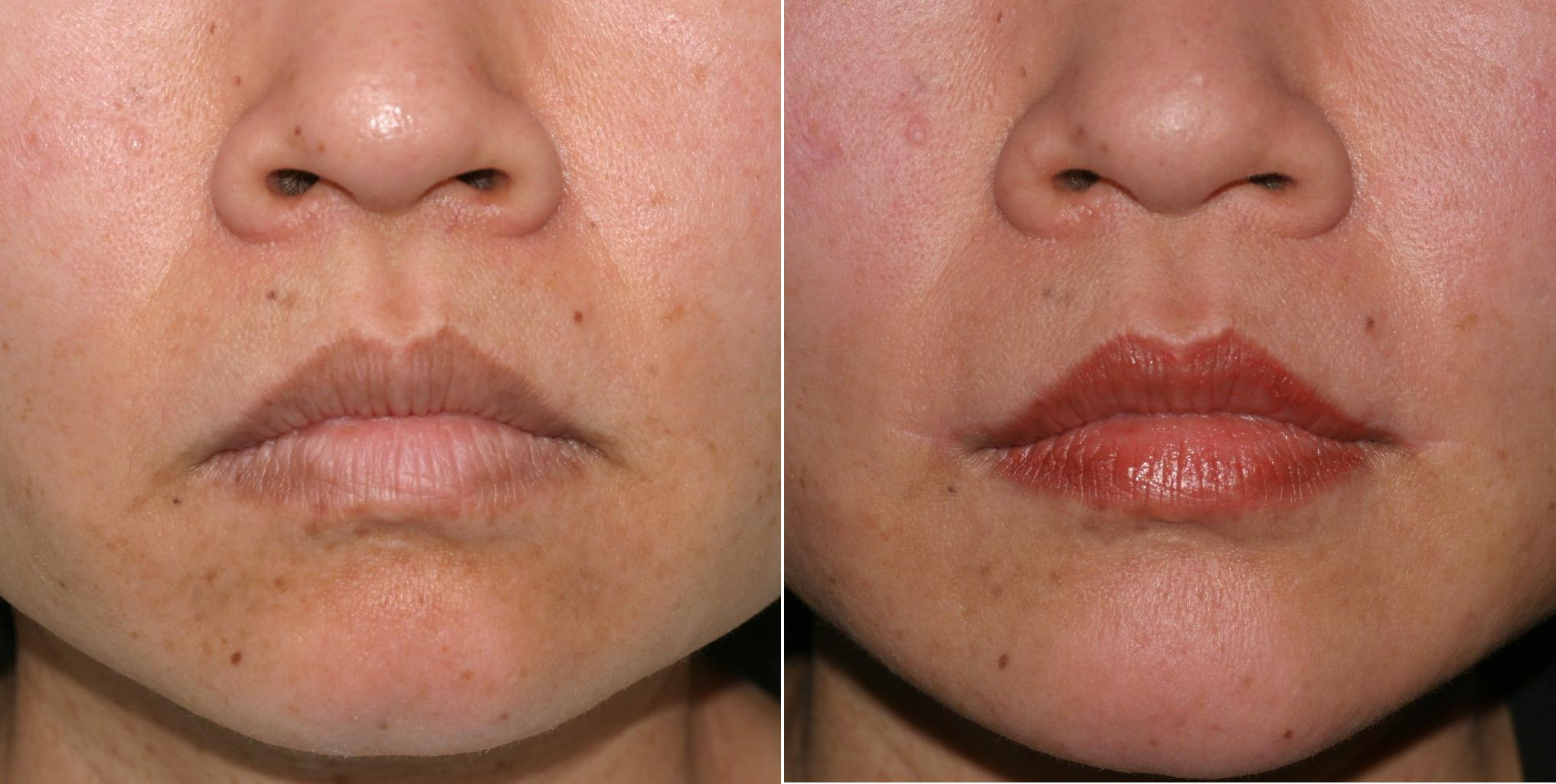
Lip lift: the pre-operative aspect (left), and the post-operative aspect of the lifted corners of the mouth.

=== Direct lip lift (DLL) ===
The "gull-wing lift" is an effective surgical technique for increasing the prominence (display) of the vermilion coloring of the lips, by removing skin (and other tissues) as required, either directly from or from above the white line of skin that borders onto, and sets off, the vermilion of the lips (the white roll). The incisions remove tissue and significantly alter the shape of the lips by moving up the vermilion from both peaks of the Cupid's bow outwards to the commissures, the corners of the mouth. Incisions are also made below the lower lip to increase the projection of the vermilion of the lower lip. This gull-wing lip lift usually requires an OR time of approximately 20 minutes; post-operatively, the swelling of the lips subsides at 1–2 weeks and the tightness subsides at 2–4 months. Asymmetry, under-correction, and hypertrophic scarring are possible complications.

=== Indirect lip lift (ILL) ===
==== Subnasal bullhorn ILL ====
A technical variant of the gull-wing lip lift is the sub-nasal lip lift (bull-horn lip lift), which involves the removal of either an ellipse or a curved-edge ellipse of tissue from under the nose. The skin then is raised, and sutured to lift the lip and expose more of the upper-lip vermilion. Depending upon the indications of the patient, this technique can increase the drooping the corners of the mouth (commissures); thus, the sub-nasal lip lift often includes a corner-lift surgical step. In the corner lift procedure (external angle oral commissuroplasty), triangles of tissue are resected from above the commissures, thereby elevating the corners of the mouth. A descending wedge of tissue can also be removed to add contour to the Cupid's bow or to reduce bulky lips.

==== Thread lip lift ====
Another variation is the thread lift, in which a square stitch is placed from one nostril to the other and down to the peaks of the Cupid's bow. This variation has fallen out of favor because the results are short-lived.

==== Double duck lip lift ====
Another variation is the double duck lip lift, in which the columella of the nose is not incised.

=== Corner of the mouth lift (CML) ===
Another variation of the procedure consists of a lenticular excision of the white skin surrounding the upper oral commissure in order to lift this part of the lips. This technique has also been dubbed the "Smile Lift".

=== V-Y lip augmentation ===
Another variation of the procedure is for a surgeon to make an incision inside the mouth to loosen the mucosa and vermilion, which are then advanced and secured, leaving a portion of scar tissue inside the mouth which may take 2–4 months to heal. Yet another technique uses a "W" incision inside the mouth to create several "V" flaps, which are then used in a V-to-Y plasty technique to advance the vermilion of either or both lips. This procedure leaves no exposed areas inside the mouth, but can be painful and has a lengthy recovery period.

== Outcomes ==
Although surgeons report patient satisfaction with these techniques to be "high," no one variation has been sufficiently applauded to become the standard procedure. Most of these methods result in an increase in the amount of vermilion visible. Quantitative data exists for the V-Y lip augmentation, for which statistically significant increases in upper vermilion height and surface area have been measured. A systematic review regarding "non-filling" procedures for lip augmentation published in 2014 showed that philtrum length decreases with Indirect Lip Lift techniques, but not with V-Y lip augmentation.

Complications which may arise from lip lift surgery include:

- Numbness
- Stiffness
- Pain
- Parasthesia
- Lip distortion
- Lip lengthening
- Smile deformation
- Speech impediment
- Visible scarring

Because of this, patients must be on bed rest for at least a week. In particular, the technique of removing skin at or directly above the white roll has been singled out as resulting in unfavorable scarring and stiffness in the lips.

Advancements and improvements in non-surgical fillers available for lip enhancement has reduced demand for the lip lift procedure.

== Bibliography ==
- Aiache, Adrien E (1997). "Rejuvenation of the Perioral Area". Dermatologic Clinics. 15 (4): 665–72. doi:10.1016/S0733-8635(05)70475-7. PMID 9348466.
- Austin, H. W (1986). "The lip lift". Plastic and Reconstructive Surgery. 77 (6): 990–4. doi:10.1097/00006534-198606000-00024. PMID 3714896.
- Fanous, N (1984). "Correction of thin lips: "lip lift"". Plastic and Reconstructive Surgery. 74 (1): 33–41. doi:10.1097/00006534-198407000-00005. PMID 6739598.
- Greenwald, A. E (1987). "The lip lift". Plastic and Reconstructive Surgery. 79 (1): 147. doi:10.1097/00006534-198701000-00036. PMID 3797512.
- Jacono, Andrew A; Quatela, Vito C (2004). "Quantitative Analysis of Lip Appearance After V-Y Lip Augmentation". Archives of Facial Plastic Surgery. 6 (3): 172–7. doi:10.1001/archfaci.6.3.172. PMID 15148125.
- Rohrich, R. J; Reagan, B. J; Adams Jr, W. P; Kenkel, J. M; Beran, S. J (2000). "Early results of vermilion lip augmentation using acellular allogeneic dermis: An adjunct in facial rejuvenation". Plastic and Reconstructive Surgery. 105 (1): 409–16, discussion 417–8. doi:10.1097/00006534-200001000-00067. PMID 10627010.
- Weston, George W; Poindexter, Byron D; Sigal, Robert K; Austin, Harvey W (2009). "Lifting Lips: 28 Years of Experience Using the Direct Excision Approach to Rejuvenating the Aging Mouth". Aesthetic Surgery Journal. 29 (2): 83–6. doi:10.1016/j.asj.2009.01.013. PMID 19371836.
- Wilkinson, Tolbert S. (2013). Practical Procedures in Aesthetic Plastic Surgery. ISBN 978-1-4612-2594-2.
- Wilkinson, T. S (1994). "'Lip lift' resection". Plastic and Reconstructive Surgery. 94 (1): 212. doi:10.1097/00006534-199407000-00037. PMID 8016240.
- Moragas, Joan San Miguel; Vercruysse, Herman Junior; Mommaerts, Maurice Y (2014). "'Non-filling' procedures for lip augmentation: A systematic review of contemporary techniques and their outcomes". Journal of Cranio-Maxillofacial Surgery. 42 (6): 943–52. doi:10.1016/j.jcms.2014.01.015. PMID 24534683.
