= N,N'-Methylenebisacrylamide =

Chemical compound, polyacrylamide crosslinker

N,N′-Methylenebisacrylamide
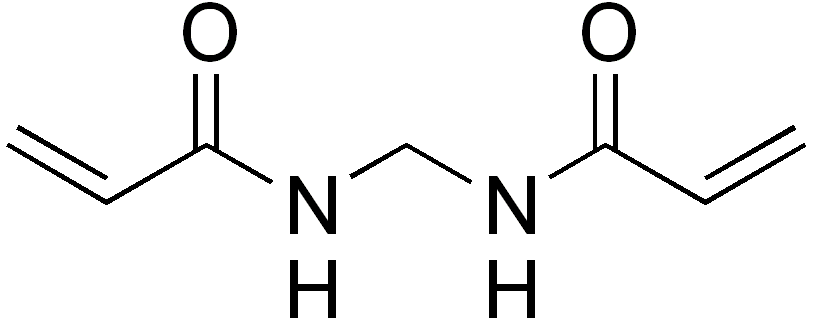

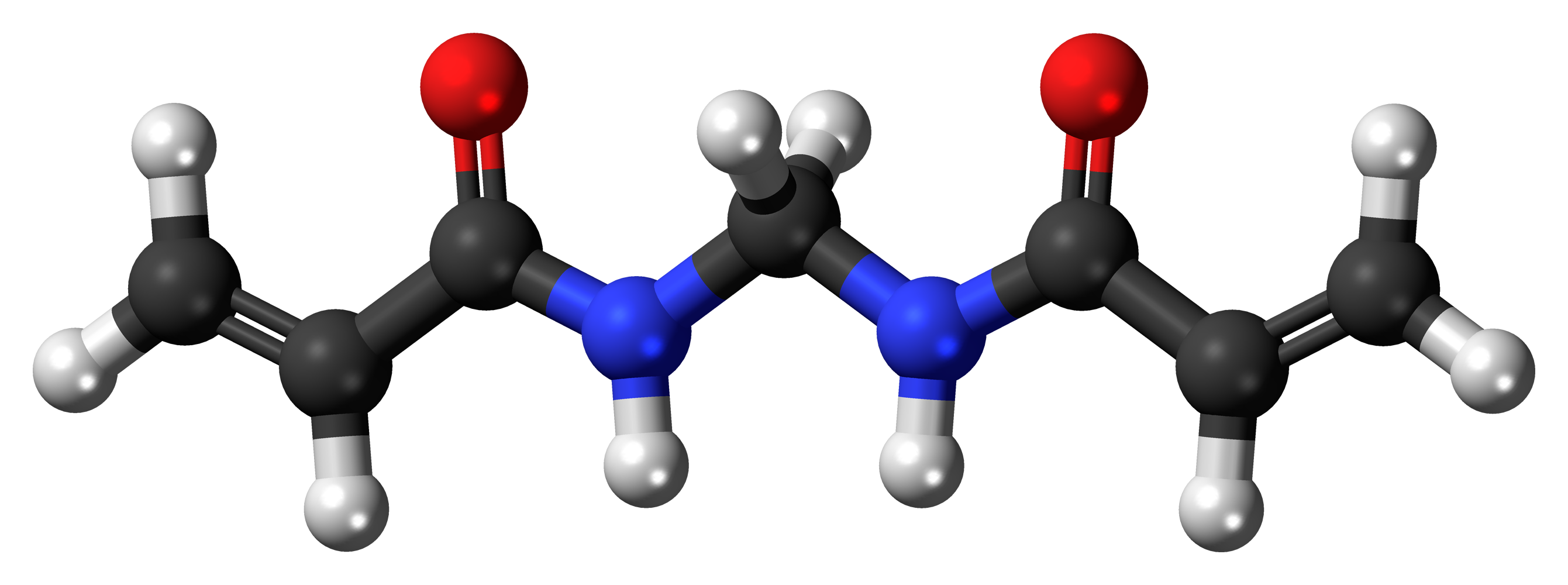

Names
- Preferred IUPAC name N,N′-Methylenedi(prop-2-enamide)
- Other names bis

Identifiers
CAS Number	110-26-9
3D model (JSmol)	Interactive image
ChemSpider	7750
ECHA InfoCard	100.003.411
EC Number	203-750-9
MeSH	C021221
PubChem CID	8041
UNII	EDK4RIE19C
CompTox Dashboard (EPA)	DTXSID8025595
- InChI: InChI=1S/C7H10N2O2/c1-3-6(10)8-5-9-7(11)4-2/h3-4H,1-2,5H2,(H,8,10)(H,9,11) Key: ZIUHHBKFKCYYJD-UHFFFAOYSA-N; InChI=1/C7H10N2O2/c1-3-6(10)8-5-9-7(11)4-2/h3-4H,1-2,5H2,(H,8,10)(H,9,11) Key: ZIUHHBKFKCYYJD-UHFFFAOYAA
- SMILES: C=CC(=O)NCNC(=O)C=C

Properties
Chemical formula	C_{7}H_{10}N_{2}O_{2}
Molar mass	154.169 g·mol^{−1}
Appearance	white solid
Melting point	181–182 °C (358–360 °F; 454–455 K)
- Except where otherwise noted, data are given for materials in their standard state (at 25 °C [77 °F], 100 kPa). verify (what is ?) Infobox references

N,N′-Methylenebisacrylamide (MBAm or MBAA, colloquially "bis") is the organic compound with the formula CH_{2}[NHC(O)CH=CH_{2}]_{2}. A colorless solid, this compound is a crosslinking agent in polyacrylamides, e.g., as used for SDS-PAGE.

== Synthesis ==
Acrylamide reacts with an aqueous solution of formaldehyde in the presence of copper(I) chloride as a polymerization inhibitor and sulfuric acid as catalyst to form N,N′-methylenebisacrylamide with yields of 60 to 80%.

The reaction proceeds via N-hydroxymethylacrylamide, which can be detected in alkaline solution and decomposes in acid to give N,N′-methylenebisacrylamide. Using acrylamide and paraformaldehyde in 1,2-dichloroethane gives a clear solution upon heating, from which MBA crystallizes.

In aqueous media, acrylonitrile also reacts with formaldehyde to give crude N,N′-methylenebisacrylamide, which can be purified by recrystallization with acetone/water.

== Reactions and uses ==
Under basic conditions, MBA reacts further with formaldehyde at the amide nitrogen to give N-hydroxymethyl,N,N′-methylenebisacrylamide. Nucleophiles such as alcohols, amines, or thiols add across the activated vinyl groups, giving mixtures of mono- and disubstituted products.

As a bifunctional electron-poor dienophile, MBA reacts with electron-rich dienes, such as cyclopentadiene, in Diels–Alder reactions, giving the corresponding norbornene adducts.

As a symmetric, unconjugated divinyl monomer, MBA can be used with suitable initiators in cyclopolymerizations to create linear, soluble polymers whose backbones are built from five- and seven-membered rings. With acrylic and vinylic monomers such as acrylonitrile, acrylamide, and substituted acrylamides, MBA can undergo radical copolymerization to form highly crosslinked gels, using peroxides, UV light, or redox initiators.

The properties of such gels are determined by the crosslink density, and targeted gel formation using MBA crosslinking gives useful technical properties used in various applications, such as in adhesives, paints, and superabsorbents. In biochemistry, MBA is used for chromatography gels and polyacrylamide gel electrophoresis.

== See also ==
- DATD
