= Polyacrylamide =

Names
- IUPAC name poly(2-propenamide)
- Other names poly(2-propenamide), poly(1-carbamoylethylene)

Identifiers
CAS Number	9003-05-8
ChemSpider	none
ECHA InfoCard	100.118.050
UNII	5D6TC4BRWV (1500 MW)
CompTox Dashboard (EPA)	DTXSID7042308

Properties
Chemical formula	(C_{3}H_{5}NO)_{n}
- Except where otherwise noted, data are given for materials in their standard state (at 25 °C [77 °F], 100 kPa). verify (what is ?) Infobox references

Polyacrylamide (abbreviated as PAM or pAAM) is a polymer with the formula (-CH_{2}CHCONH_{2}-). It has a linear-chain structure. PAM is highly water-absorbent, forming a soft gel when hydrated. In 2008, an estimated 750,000,000 kg were produced, mainly for water treatment and the paper and mineral industries.

== Physicochemical properties ==
Polyacrylamide is a polyolefin. It can be viewed as polyethylene with amide substituents on alternating carbons. Unlike various nylons, polyacrylamide is not a polyamide because the amide groups are not in the polymer backbone. Owing to the presence of the amide (CONH_{2}) groups, alternating carbon atoms in the backbone are stereogenic (chiral). For this reason, polyacrylamide exists in atactic, syndiotactic, and isotactic forms, although this aspect is rarely discussed. The polymerization is initiated with radicals and is assumed to be stereorandom.

=== Copolymers and modified polymers ===
Linear polyacrylamide is a water-soluble polymer. Other polar solvents include DMSO and various alcohols. Cross-linking can be introduced using N,N-methylenebisacrylamide. Some crosslinked materials are swellable but not soluble, i.e., they are hydrogels.

Partial hydrolysis occurs at elevated temperatures in aqueous media, converting some amide substituents to carboxylates. This hydrolysis thus makes the polymer particularly hydrophilic. The polymer produced from N,N-dimethylacrylamide resists hydrolysis.

Copolymers of acrylamide include those derived from acrylic acid.

== Uses ==
In the 1970s and 1980s, the proportionately largest use of these polymers was in water treatment. The next major application by weight is additives for pulp processing and papermaking. About 30% of polyacrylamide is used in the oil and mineral industries.

=== Flocculation ===
One of the largest uses for polyacrylamide is to flocculate solids in a liquid. This process applies to water treatment, and processes like paper making and screen printing. Polyacrylamide can be supplied in a powder or liquid form, with the liquid form being subcategorized as solution and emulsion polymer.

Even though these products are often called 'polyacrylamide', many are actually copolymers of acrylamide and one or more other species, such as an acrylic acid or a salt thereof. These copolymers have modified wetting and swellability.

The ionic forms of polyacrylamide has found an important role in the potable water treatment industry. Trivalent metal salts, like ferric chloride and aluminum chloride, are bridged by the long polymer chains of polyacrylamide. This results in significant enhancement of the flocculation rate. This allows water treatment plants to greatly improve the removal of total organic content (TOC) from raw water.

=== Fossil fuel industry ===
In the oil and gas industry, polyacrylamide derivatives (especially co-polymers) have a substantial effect on production by enhanced oil recovery by viscosity enhancement. High viscosity aqueous solutions can be generated with low concentrations of polyacrylamide polymers, which are injected to improve the economics of conventional water-flooding. In a separate application, hydraulic fracturing benefits from drag reduction resulting from injection of these solutions. These applications use large volumes of polymer solutions at concentration of 30–3000 mg/L.

=== Soil conditioning ===
The primary functions of polyacrylamide soil conditioners are to increase soil tilth, aeration, and porosity and reduce compaction, dustiness and water run-off. Typical applications are 10 mg/L, which is still expensive for many applications. Secondary functions are to increase plant vigor, color, appearance, rooting depth, and emergence of seeds while decreasing water requirements, diseases, erosion and maintenance expenses. FC 2712 is used for this purpose.

=== Molecular biology laboratories ===
Polyacrylamide is also often used in molecular biology applications as a medium for electrophoresis of proteins and nucleic acids in a technique known as PAGE. PAGE was first used in a laboratory setting in the early 1950s. In 1959, the groups of Davis and Ornstein and of Raymond and Weintraub independently published on the use of polyacrylamide gel electrophoresis to separate charged molecules. The technique is widely accepted today, and remains a common protocol in molecular biology labs.

Acrylamide has other uses in molecular biology laboratories, including the use of linear polyacrylamide (LPA) as a carrier, which aids in the precipitation of small amounts of nucleic acids (DNA and RNA). Many laboratory supply companies sell LPA for this use. In addition, under certain conditions, it can be used to selectively precipitate only RNA species from a mixture of nucleic acids.

=== Mechanobiology ===
The elastic modulus of polyacrylamide can be changed by varying the ratio of monomer to cross-linker during the fabrication of polyacrylamide gel. This property makes polyacrylamide useful in the field of mechanobiology, as a number of cells respond to mechanical stimuli.

=== Niche uses ===
The polymer is also used to make Gro-Beast toys, which expand when placed in water, such as the Test Tube Aliens. Similarly, the absorbent properties of one of its copolymers can be utilized as an additive in body-powder.

It has been used as a subdermal filler for aesthetic facial surgery

It was also used in the synthesis of the first Boger fluid.

== Environmental effects ==
Considering the volume of polyacrylamide produced, these materials have been heavily scrutinized with regards to environmental and health impacts.

Polyacrylamide is of low toxicity but its precursor acrylamide is a neurotoxin and carcinogen. Thus, concerns naturally center on the possibility that polyacrylamide is contaminated with acrylamide. Considerable effort is made to scavenge traces of acrylamide from the polymer intended for use near food.

Additionally, there are concerns that polyacrylamide may de-polymerise to form acrylamide. Under conditions typical for cooking, polyacrylamide does not de-polymerise significantly. The single claim that polyacrylamide reverts to acrylamide has been widely challenged.

Polyacrylamide is most commonly partially biodegraded by the action of amidases, producing ammonia and polyacrylates. Polyacrylates are hard to biodegrade, but some soil microbe cultures have been shown to do so in aerobic conditions.

== See also ==
- Aquamid
- Chitosan
- Rhoca-Gil
- Sodium polyacrylate, a similar material
