= Wrinkle =

Crease on otherwise smooth surface

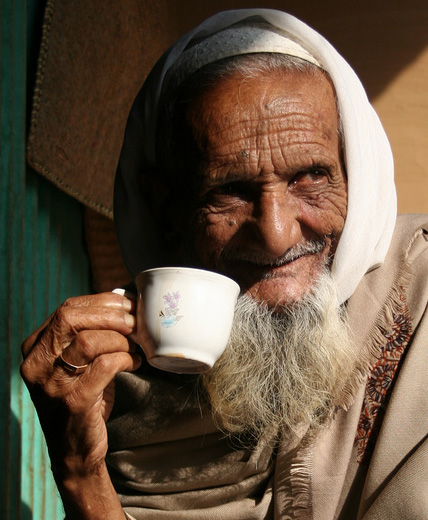
Wrinkles on the face and hands are a typical sign of aging.

A wrinkle, also known as a rhytid, is a fold, ridge or crease in an otherwise smooth surface, such as on skin or fabric. Skin wrinkles typically appear as a result of ageing processes such as glycation, habitual sleeping positions, loss of body mass, sun damage, or temporarily, as the result of prolonged immersion in water. Age wrinkling in the skin is promoted by habitual facial expressions, aging, sun damage, smoking, poor hydration, and various other factors. In humans, it can also be prevented to some degree by avoiding excessive solar exposure and through diet (in particular through consumption of carotenoids, tocopherols and flavonoids, vitamins (A, C, D and E), essential omega-3-fatty acids, certain proteins and lactobacilli).

== Skin ==
=== Causes for aging wrinkles ===
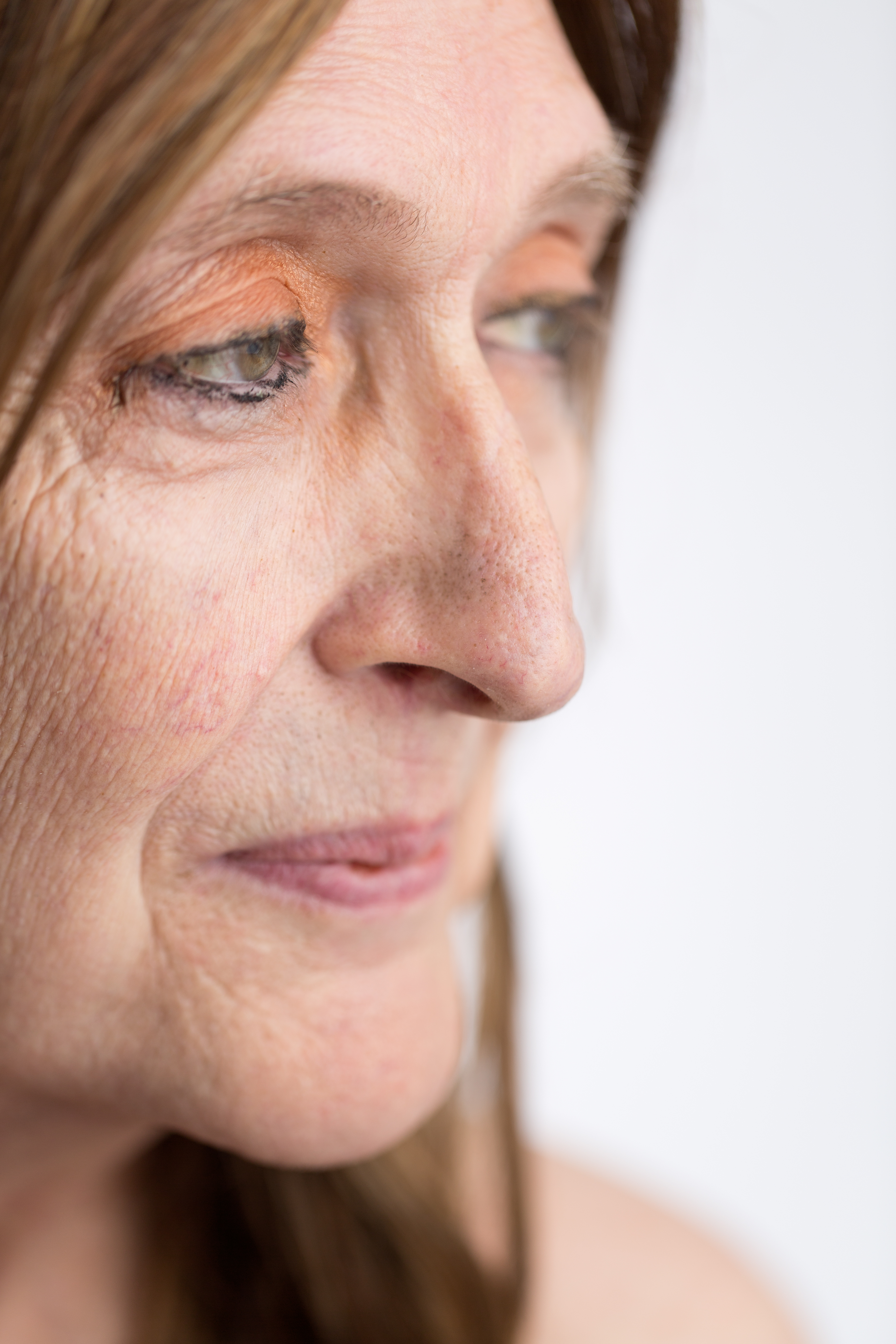
A woman of European origin with facial wrinkles

Development of facial wrinkles is a kind of fibrosis of the skin. Misrepair-accumulation aging theory suggests that wrinkles develop from incorrect repairs of injured elastic fibers and collagen fibers. Repeated extensions and compressions of the skin cause repeated injuries of extracellular fibers in derma. During the repairing process, some of the broken elastic fibers and collagen fibers are not regenerated and restored but replaced by altered fibers. When an elastic fiber is broken in an extended state, it may be replaced by a "long" collagen fiber. Accumulation of "long" collagen fibers makes part of the skin looser and stiffer, and as a consequence, a big fold of skin appears. When a "long" collagen is broken in a compressed state, it may be replaced by a "short" collagen fiber. The "shorter" collagen fibers will restrict the extension of "longer" fibers, and make the "long" fibers in a folding state permanently. A small fold, namely a permanent wrinkle, then appears.

=== Water-immersion wrinkling ===
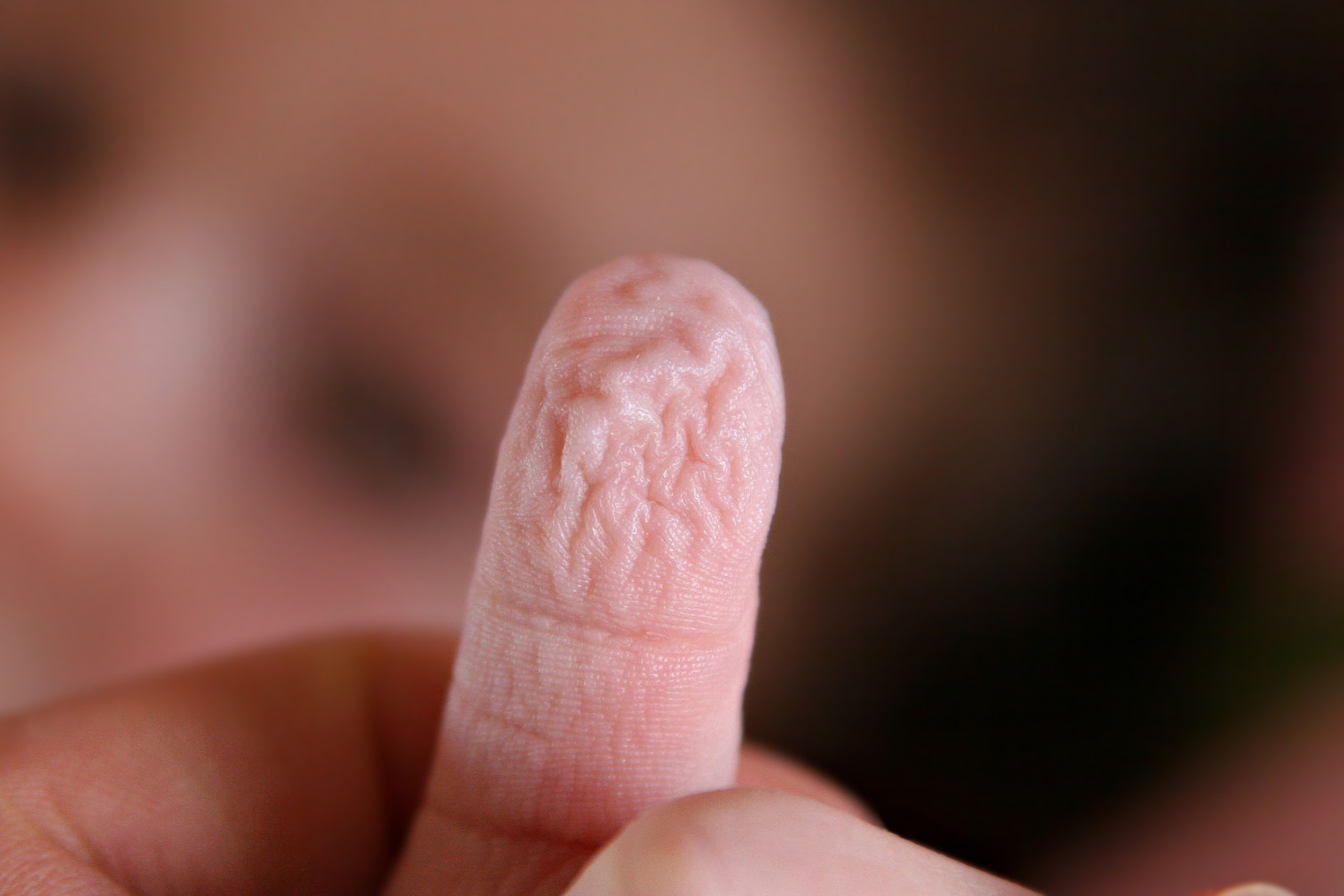
A wrinkled finger after a warm bath

The wrinkles that occur in skin over prolonged exposure to water are sometimes referred to as pruney fingers or water aging. In perhaps archaic Wiltshire dialect, the condition is referred to as quobbled. This is a temporary skin condition where the skin on the palms of the hand or feet becomes wrinkly. This wrinkling response may have imparted an evolutionary benefit by providing improved traction in wet conditions, and a better grasp of wet objects. These results were called into question by a 2014 study that failed to reproduce any improvement of handling wet objects with wrinkled fingertips. However, a 2021 study of gripping efficiency found that wrinkles decreased the force required to grip wet objects by 20%, supporting the traction hypothesis.

Prior to a 1935 study, the common explanation was based on water absorption in the keratin-laden epithelial skin when immersed in water, causing the skin to expand and resulting in a larger surface area, forcing it to wrinkle. Usually the tips of the fingers and toes are the first to wrinkle because of a thicker layer of keratin and an absence of hairs which secrete the protective oil called sebum.

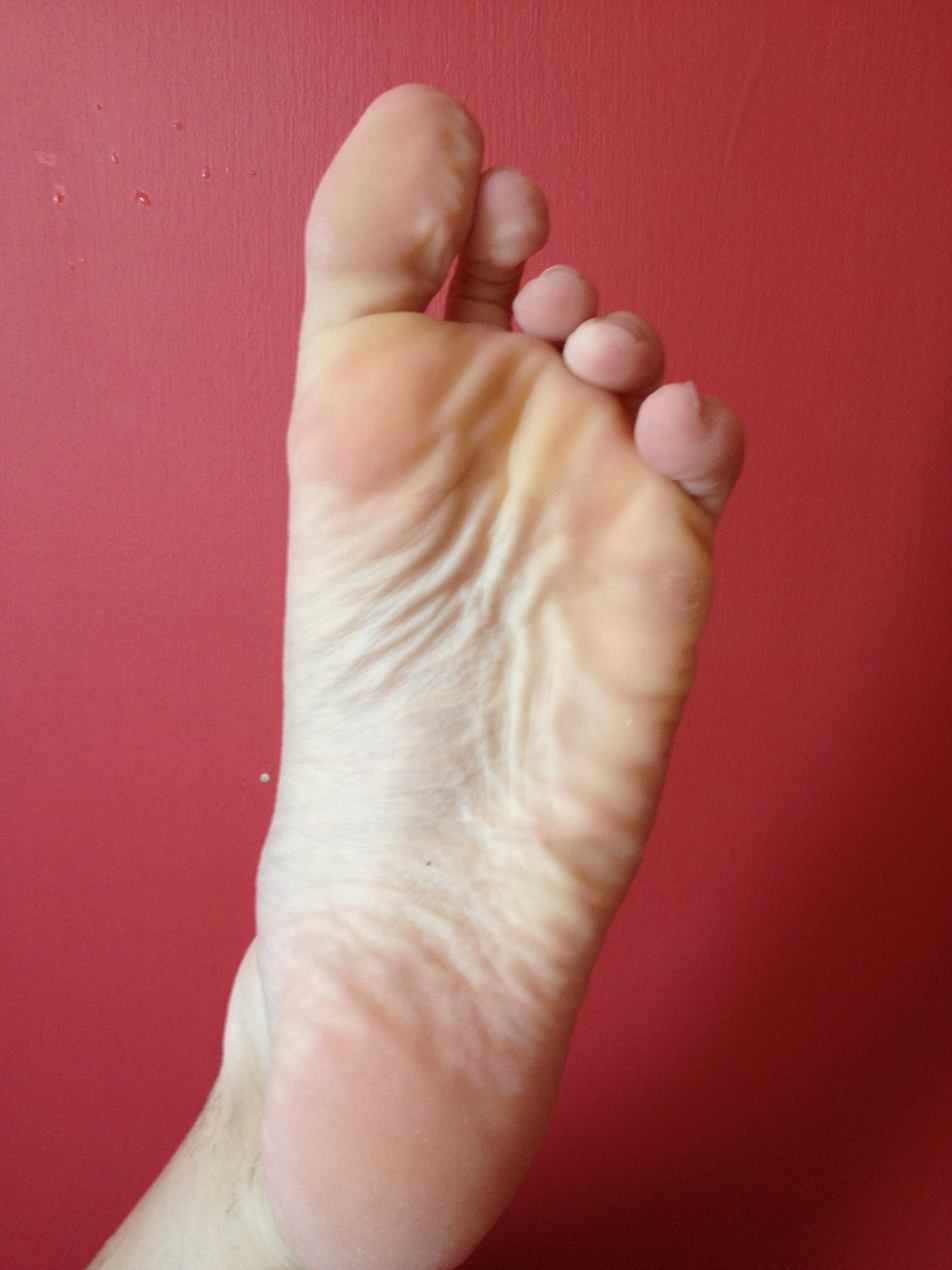
Adult sole showing water immersion wrinkling

In the 1935 study, however, Lewis and Pickering were studying patients with palsy of the median nerve when they discovered that skin wrinkling did not occur in the areas of the patients' skin normally innervated by the damaged nerve. This suggested that the nervous system plays an essential role in wrinkling, so the phenomenon could not be entirely explained simply by water absorption. Recent research shows that wrinkling is related to vasoconstriction. Water probably initiates the wrinkling process by altering the balance of electrolytes in the skin as it diffuses into the hands and soles via their many sweat ducts. This could alter the stability of the membranes of the many neurons that synapse on the many blood vessels underneath skin, causing them to fire more rapidly. Increased neuronal firing causes blood vessels to constrict, decreasing the amount of fluid underneath the skin. This decrease in fluid would cause a decrease in tension, causing the skin to become wrinkly.

This insight resulted in bedside tests for nerve damage and vasoconstriction. Wrinkling is often scored with immersion of the hands for 30 minutes in water or EMLA cream with measurements steps of 5 minutes, and counting the number of visible wrinkles in time. Not all healthy persons have finger wrinkling after immersion, so it would be safe to say that sympathetic function is preserved if finger wrinkling after immersion in water is observed, but if the fingers emerge smooth it cannot be assumed that there is a lesion to the autonomic supply or to the peripheral nerves of the hand.

=== Other animals with wrinkles ===
Examples of wrinkles can be found in various animal species that grow loose, excess skin, particularly when they are young. Several breeds of dog, such as the Pug and the Shar Pei, have been bred to exaggerate this trait. In dogs bred for fighting, this is the result of selection for loose skin, which confers a protective advantage.

=== Techniques and procedures for reducing the appearance of aging wrinkles ===
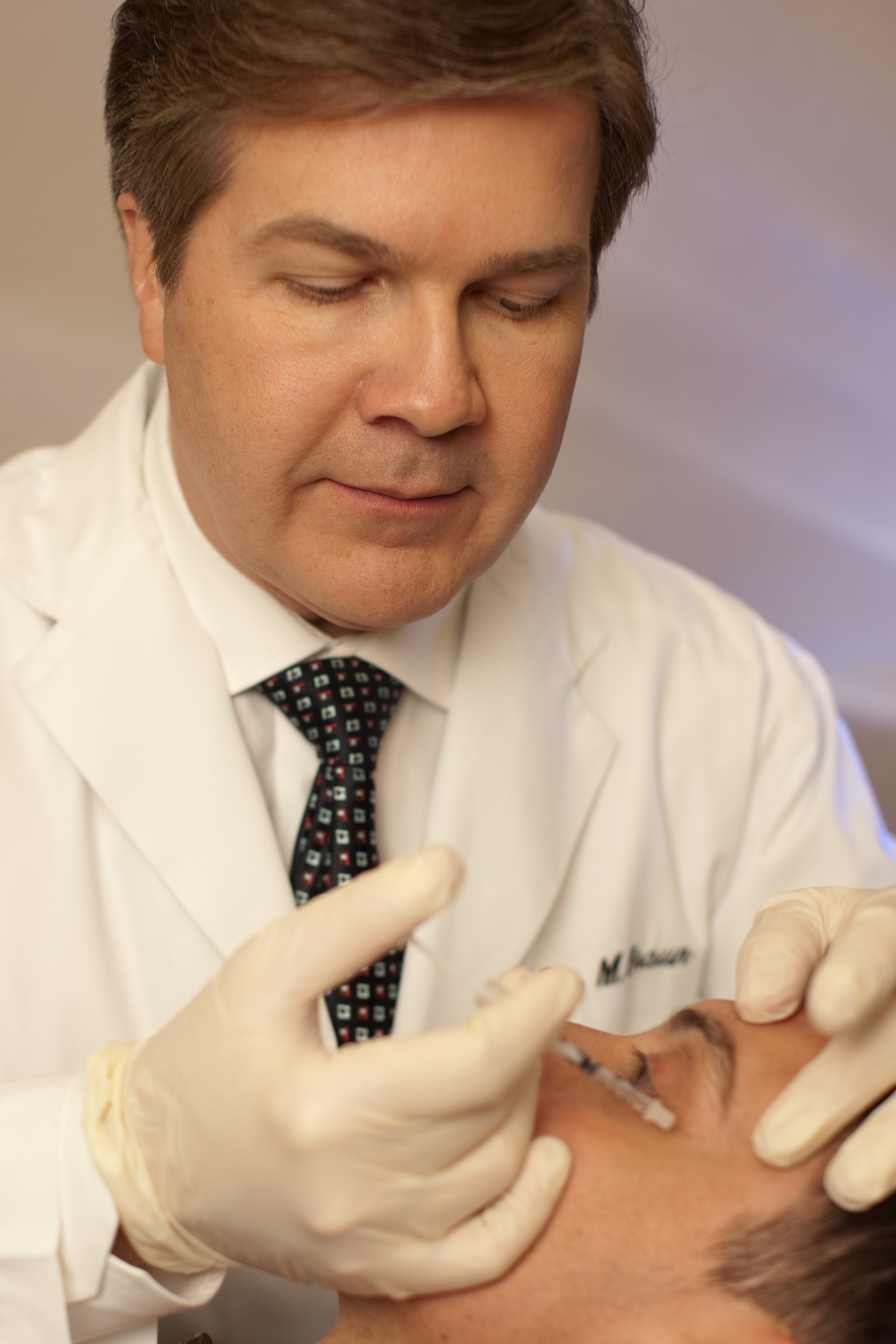
A man receiving a Botox injection

==== Retinoids ====
Retinoids, a class of natural and synthetic vitamin A analogues, are widely utilized for their anti-aging effects, specifically in the reduction of facial wrinkles and fine lines. Tretinoin (Retin-A) and tazarotene (Tazorac) are the only topical retinoids approved as medical agents for the treatment of wrinkles and fine lines from photodamage. Other retinoids, such as retinol, retinaldehyde, and retinyl palmitate, are commonly found in over-the-counter cosmeceuticals and have some evidence for reducing wrinkles and fine lines but are regulated as cosmetics rather than medicines.

Retinoids function by binding to retinoic acid receptors (RAR) and retinoid-X receptors (RXR), which promotes keratinocyte proliferation, increases epithelial cell turnover, stimulates collagen synthesis, and inhibits collagen degradation. Retinoids also appear to improve the epidermal barrier and reduce transepithelial water loss.

==== Glycosaminoglycans ====
Topical glycosaminoglycans supplements can help to provide temporary restoration of enzyme balance to slow or prevent matrix breakdown and consequent onset of wrinkle formation. Glycosaminoglycans (GAGs) are produced by the body to maintain structural integrity in tissues and to maintain fluid balance. Hyaluronic acid is a type of GAG that promotes collagen synthesis, repair, and hydration. GAGs serve as a natural moisturizer and lubricant between epidermal cells to inhibit the production of matrix metalloproteinases (MMPs).

==== Injectable fillers ====
Dermal fillers are injectable products frequently used to correct wrinkles, and other depressions in the skin. They are often a kind of soft tissue designed to enable injection into the skin for purposes of improving the appearance. The most common products are based on hyaluronic acid and calcium hydroxylapatite.

==== Neuromodulators ====
Botulinum toxin is a neurotoxin protein produced by the bacterium Clostridium botulinum. The neurotoxin treats wrinkles by immobilizing the muscles that cause wrinkles. It is not appropriate for the treatment of all wrinkles; it is indicated for the treatment of glabellar lines (between the eyebrows, also called frown lines) in adults. Any other usage is not approved by the FDA and is considered off-label use.

Botox is a specific form of botulinum toxin manufactured by Allergan for both therapeutic and cosmetic use. Besides its cosmetic application, Botox is used in the treatment of other conditions including migraine headache and cervical dystonia (spasmodic torticollis) (a neuromuscular disorder involving the head and neck).

Dysport, manufactured by Ipsen, received FDA approval and is now used to treat cervical dystonia as well as glabellar lines in adults. In 2010, another form of botulinum toxin, one free of complexing proteins, became available to Americans. Xeomin received FDA approval for medical indications in 2010 and cosmetic indications in 2011.

==== Photorejuvenation ====
Laser resurfacing is an FDA-cleared skin resurfacing procedure in which lasers are used to improve the condition of the skin. Two types of lasers are used to reduce the appearance of fine lines and wrinkles on the face; laser ablation, which removes thin layers of skin, and nonablative lasers that stimulate collagen production. Nonablative lasers are less effective than ablative ones, but they are less invasive, and recovery time is short. After the procedure people experience temporary redness, itching and swelling.

== See also ==
- Botulinum toxin
- Injectable filler
- Wrinkly skin syndrome
