= Injectable filler =

Fillers for cosmetic skin smoothing

Injectable filler is a substance made to be injected into connective tissues, such as skin, cartilage or even bone, for cosmetic or medical purposes. The most common application of injectable fillers is to change one's facial appearance, but they also are used to reduce symptoms of osteoarthritis, treat tendon or ligament injuries, support bone and gum regeneration, and for other medical applications. Injectable fillers can be in the form of hydrogel or gels made from pulverized grafts.

Injectable fillers have risen in popularity mostly due to the wide application of dermal fillers in 1980s. Their premise is to help fill in facial wrinkles, provide facial volume, and augment facial features. Potential side effects include bruising, allergic reactions which may cause scarring or lumps, or infections from improper sterilisation. This may include HIV infection. Blindness due to retrograde (opposite the direction of normal blood flow) embolization into the ophthalmic and retinal arteries can occur.

== Materials used ==
Injectable fillers are composed of a wide range of natural and synthetic biomaterials, which can be categorized as resorbable or non-resorbable polymers. Injectable fillers are frequently formulated as hydrogels composed of hydrophilic polymer networks that can retain large amounts of water while maintaining structural integrity. Common materials include naturally derived polymers such as hyaluronic acid, gelatin, collagen, chitosan, alginate, and polysaccharides, as well as synthetic polymers like polyethylene glycol (PEG), poly(lactic acid), poly(methyl methacrylate), polyacrylamide, and dextran. These materials are often selected for their biocompatibility and structural similarity to the extracellular matrix, enabling integration with surrounding tissues. To enable in situ gelation, polymers are typically functionalized with reactive groups such as phenols, amines, or glutamine residues, allowing controlled crosslinking after injection. In advanced formulations, these hydrogel matrices may also serve as carriers for therapeutic fillers, including cells, proteins, or drugs, expanding their functionality beyond structural augmentation.

Hyaluronic acid

Hyaluronic acid
- Hyaluronic acid structure Example of a naturally derived polymer for injectable filler use

Hyaluronic acid is one of the most common materials used for injectable filler procedures due to its natural presence in vertebrates. Its inherent biocompatibility and biodegradability makes it particularly well suited for these applications, contributing to its widespread use in aesthetic and medical treatments. The chemical structure of hyaluronic acid is made up of repeating disaccharide units that consist of N-acetyl-D-glucosamine and D-glucuronic acid.

Crosslinking mechanisms in injectable fillers

Crosslinking mechanisms determine the mechanical stability, degradation behavior, prolonged in vivo retention time, and in situ gelation properties of the injectable filler material. Hydrogels used as injectable fillers may be formed through physical (non-covalent) interactions or chemical (covalent) crosslinking, with chemical crosslinking generally providing greater stability and tunability. In collagen-based fillers, crosslinking methods such as glutaraldehyde treatment have been used to enhance integration, while synthetic fillers like poly(methyl methacrylate) rely on particulate scaffolds that induce fibrotic tissue formation rather than on degradable networks. Among chemical approaches, enzymatic crosslinking has gained prominence for its ability to proceed under physiological conditions without toxic catalysts or external stimuli such as ultraviolet light. Common enzymatic crosslinking mechanisms include horseradish peroxidase (HRP), tyrosinase, and transglutaminase. Horseradish peroxidase catalyzes the formation of phenolic radicals in the presence of hydrogen peroxide. Tyrosinase oxidizes phenolic groups into reactive quinones capable of forming crosslinks. Transglutaminase creates covalent bonds between glutamine and lysine residues in polymer chains. These mechanisms enable precise control over crosslinking density, which in turn governs key material properties such as stiffness, degradation rate, and pore size.

1,4 – Butanediol diglycidyl ether (BDDE) cross-linked hyaluronic acid fillers

BDDE crosslinking
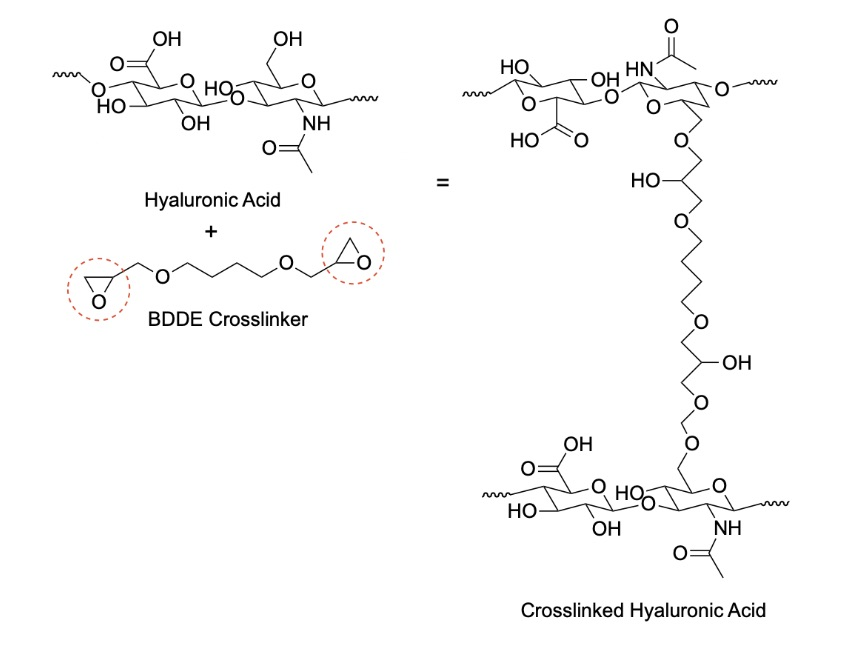
- Chemical depiction of hyaluronic acid being crosslinked by BDDE Example of crosslinked hyaluronic acid via BDDE

Most hyaluronic acid injectable fillers are cross-linked using chemicals such as 1,4 butanediol ether (BDDE) to enhance their stability and resistance to enzymatic degradation. Cross-linking significantly improves pharmokinetics and allows the filler to remain in the body for a longer duration. However, concerns have been raised regarding the long-term safety of BDDE, which remains incompletely understood. A 2024 review reports that the long-lasting side effects and potential harm of BDDE has caused allergic reactions in patients. A 2015 study found that 34.3% of patients in a cohort of 452 experienced allergic reactions associated with BDDE exposure.

Self-cross-linkable hyaluronic acid

Self crosslinking hyaluronic acid
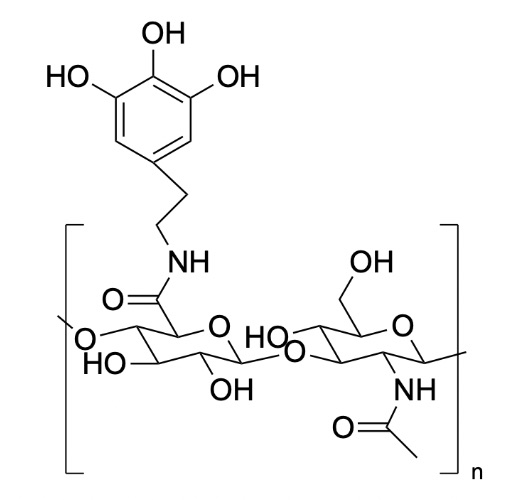
- Structure of self crosslinking hyaluronic acid Self crosslinked HA via autoxidation

Natural hyaluronic acid rapidly degrades in vivo, which limits its effectiveness as a long-lasting injectable filler due to the lack of cross-linking chemistry. A 2019 study investigated a self-cross-linkable form of hyaluronic acid modified with gallol groups that can form a stable hydrogel in vivo through autoxidation. The technique eliminates the need for commonly used cross-linkers in hyaluronic acid fillers like BDDE. The gallol groups on the hyaluronic acid contain three hydroxyl groups on the benzene ring, allowing for spontaneous oxidative crosslinking in vivo without the need for additional cross-linking agents. The study confirmed that this self-cross-linkable hyaluronic acid improves pharmokinetics and the long-term performance of the filler compared to non-cross-linked forms of hyaluronic acid.

Self-cross-linkable hyaluronic acid is proposed for use in applications such as tissue augmentation and wrinkle correction. Other studies report that hyaluronic acid is used for tissue engineering as well as drug delivery mechanisms.

Polylactic acid

Poly(lactic acid)
- Poly(lactic acid) structure Example of synthetic polymer for injectable filler use

Polylactic acid (PLA) is a synthetic biodegradable polymer widely used as a dermal filler for soft tissue augmentation, classified into two stereoisomeric forms: poly(L-lactic acid) (PLLA) and poly(D,L-lactic acid) (PDLLA), both of which are widely used as dermal fillers, though variations in their physicochemical properties may lead to differences in handling characteristics and clinical performance. Unlike hyaluronic acid fillers that provide immediate volume, PLLA particles remaining after carrier absorption are degraded into lactic acid, which enhances collagen synthesis by fibroblasts, while immune cells recognize PLLA as a foreign body, initiating macrophage recruitment that induces fibroblast recruitment and fibrotic tissue formation.

== Medical uses ==
Injectable fillers are widely used in cosmetics for soft tissue augmentation and facial rejuvenation. Their primary clinical applications include the correction of facial wrinkles and folds, restoration of age-related volume loss, and the enhancement of facial contours such as the lips, cheeks, and jawline. Hyaluronic acid-based fillers are commonly used for superficial and mid-dermal injections to treat fine lines and improve skin hydration, while more robust fillers are injected into deeper tissue layers to correct severe wrinkles and provide structural support. Biodegradable fillers, such as poly(lactic acid), can stimulate collagen production, contributing to longer-term volume effects.

Injectable hydrogel-based fillers have been investigated for a wide range of medical applications due to their biocompatibility, injectability, and ability to form three-dimensional networks in situ. In wound healing, these materials provide a moist environment, act as barriers against infection, and conform to irregular tissue defects, thereby promoting tissue regeneration. They are also used to prevent post-operative adhesions by acting as physical barriers that separate tissues during healing, reducing fibrotic attachment. In hemostasis, injectable hydrogels can rapidly solidify at bleeding sites and adhere to tissues, enabling effective control of hemorrhage.

Emerging applications include regenerative approaches based on tissue engineering, where injectable scaffolds combined with cells or bioactive components aim to promote the formation of new extracellular matrix and restore tissue function, or to act as delivery systems for therapeutic agents. Cell-laden hydrogels support tissue regeneration by protecting encapsulated cells and enhancing their survival, while protein-loaded systems enable sustained release of growth factors such as vascular endothelial growth factor (VEGF) and bone morphogenetic proteins, promoting angiogenesis and bone repair. Drug-loaded hydrogels have also been developed for localized therapies, including cancer treatment, cartilage regeneration, and myocardial repair, where controlled release improves efficacy and reduces systemic side effects.

== Pharmacokinetics ==
Most wrinkle fillers are temporary because they are eventually metabolized by the body. Some people may need more than one injection to achieve the wrinkle-smoothing effect. The effect lasts for about six months. Results depend on health of the skin, skill of the health care provider, and the type of filler used. Regardless of material (whether synthetic or organic) filler duration is highly dependent on amount of activity in the body area where it is injected. Exercise and high intensity activities such as manual labor can stimulate blood flow and shorten the lifespan of fillers.

== Side effects and risks ==
Risks of an improperly performed dermal filler procedure commonly include bruising, redness, pain, or itching. Less commonly, there may be infections or allergic reactions, which may cause scarring and lumps that may require surgical correction. In 2024, a cluster of HIV infections was described amongst clients receiving microneedling facials at a spa. More rarely, serious adverse effects such as blindness due to retrograde (opposite the direction of normal blood flow) embolization into the ophthalmic and retinal arteries can occur. Delayed skin necrosis can also occur as a complication of embolization. Embolic complications are more frequently seen when autologous fat is used as a filler, followed by hyaluronic acid. Though rare, when vision loss does occur, it is usually permanent.

== Society and culture ==
In the US, fillers are approved as medical devices by the Food and Drug Administration (FDA) and the injection is prescribed and performed by a provider. What defines a qualified dermal injection provider varies by country and is a point of debate between board-certified doctors and injectors who operate under cosmetic or aesthetician licenses.

Fillers are not to be confused with neurotoxins such as Botox. Fillers are not approved for certain parts of the body where they can be unsafe, including the penis. In the European Economic Area and the UK, fillers are non-prescription medical devices that can be injected by anyone licensed to do so by the respective medical authorities. They require a CE mark, which regulates adherence to production standards, but does not require any demonstration of medical efficacy. As a result, there are over 140 injectable fillers in the UK/European market and only six approved for use in the US.

In China, the NMPA (formerly CFDA) has also issued guidance to regulate injectable fillers.

== See also ==
- Cosmetic surgery
