= List of medical abbreviations: P =

Sortable table
Abbreviation	Meaning
p̄	after (from Latin post) [letter p with a bar over it]
pH	Potential of Hydrogen - Acidity of a fluid
P	parturition (total number of live births) phosphorus pulse post
P_{OSM}	plasma osmolality
PA	posterior–anterior, posteroanterior pulmonary artery physician assistant or physician associate psoriatic arthritis primary aldosteronism
P&A	percussion and auscultation phenol and alcohol matrixectomy
PAC	premature atrial contraction pulmonary artery catheter, pulmonary artery catheterisation
PACU	Post-anesthesia care unit
PAD	peripheral artery disease (aka peripheral artery occlusive disease) postadmission day (e.g. PAD 6 equals the sixth day of being in hospital) peripheral airspace disease Passively Acquired anti-D
PAE	prostatic artery embolization
PAF	platelet-activating factor paroxysmal atrial fibrillation (meaning intermittent AF)
PAH	pulmonary arterial hypertension phenylalanine hydroxylase
PAI-1	plasminogen activator inhibitor-1
PAL	posterior axillary line
PALS	Pediatric advanced life support (training program)
PAN	polyarteritis nodosa
PAO	peak acid output
PAOD	peripheral artery occlusive disease
PAP	Papanicolaou stain positive airway pressure pulmonary artery pressure (see pulmonary hypertension) pulmonary alveolar proteinosis
Pap	Papanicolaou test (pap smear)
PAPP-A	pregnancy-associated plasma protein A
PAPVR	partial anomalous pulmonary venous return
PARA I	indicating a woman with one child (partus = birth)
PARA II	indicating a woman with two children (partus = birth)
PASP	Pulmonary artery systolic pressure
PASH	Pseudoangiomatous stromal hyperplasia
PAT	paroxysmal atrial tachycardia
PBC	primary biliary cirrhosis, paired blood culture
PBX	probiotics
PBF	peripheral blood film
p.c.	after food (from Latin post cibum) after meals
PCA	patient-controlled analgesia
PCa	prostate cancer
PCD	postconcussional disorder primary ciliary dyskinesia
Pcele	Pseudomeningocele
PCI	percutaneous coronary intervention
PCIOL	posterior chamber intraocular lens
PCKD	Polycystic Kidney Disease
PCL	posterior cruciate ligament
PCN	penicillin
PCNL	Percutaneous nephrolithotomy
PCNSL	primary CNS (central nervous system) lymphoma
PCO	polycystic ovary (see polyendocrine metabolic ovarian syndrome (PMOS))
PCP	Pneumocystis carinii pneumonia (now called Pneumocystis pneumonia) primary care physician (also called primary care provider)
PCR	patient care report polymerase chain reaction
PCS	post-concussion syndrome
PCT	progesterone challenge test Patient care technician
PCV	packed cell volume (see hematocrit) polycythemia vera
PCWP	pulmonary capillary wedge pressure
PD	Parkinson's disease paroxysmal dyskinesia peritoneal dialysis physical diagnosis personality disorder program director
PDA	patent ductus arteriosus posterior descending artery
PDD	premenstrual dysphoric disorder
PDE	phosphodiesterase
PDGF	platelet-derived growth factor
PDR	Physicians' Desk Reference Proliferative Diabetic Retinopathy
PDT	photodynamic therapy
PDVT	postoperative deep-vein thrombosis
PE	pulmonary embolism pre-eclampsia pleural effusion physical examination
PEA	pulseless electrical activity
PEB	cisplatin, etoposide, and bleomycin (chemotherapy regimen)
PEEP	positive end-expiratory pressure
PEF	peak expiratory flow
PEFR	peak expiratory flow rate
PEG	percutaneous endoscopic gastrostomy
PEM	protein/energy malnutrition (aka Kwashiorkor)
pen	penicillin (Best practice is to avoid drug name abbreviations)
PEP	Post-exposure prophylaxis
PERM	Progressive Encephalomyelitis with Rigidity and Myoclonus
PERRL	pupils equal, round, reactive to light
PERLA	pupils equal and reactive to light and accommodation
PERRLA	pupils equal, round, reactive to light and accommodation
Per Vag	per vagina
PET	positron emission tomography (cerebral metabolic scan)
PFO	patent foramen ovale
PFT	pulmonary function test (see spirometry)
PGCS	Paediatric Glasgow Coma Scale
pH	pH (measurement of acidity)
PH	Pulmonary hypertension Past history (see also medical history)
PH_{x}	past history (see also medical history)
PHG	Portal hypertensive gastropathy
PHI	protected health information
PHN	postherpetic neuralgia
PHP	Partial Hospitalization Program
PHQ	Patient Health Questionnaire
PHTLS	prehospital trauma life support
PI	present illness
PII	personally identifiable information
PICC	peripherally inserted central catheter
PID	pelvic inflammatory disease prolapsed intervertebral disc
PIG-A	phosphatidyl inositol glycan A
PIH	pregnancy induced hypertension
PIP	proximal interphalangeal joint
PJP	Pneumocystis jirovecii pneumonia
PJS	Peutz-Jeghers syndrome
PK	protein kinase
PKA	protein kinase A
PKD	polycystic kidney disease
PKP	penetrating keratoplasty
PKU	phenylketonuria (PKU card—see Guthrie test)
PLAT	tissue plasminogen activator
PLIF	posterior lumbar interbody fusion (a type of spinal fusion)
PLT	platelets
PM	post meridiem (in the afternoon)
PMB	post-menopausal bleeding (bleeding after menopause)
PMD	primary medical doctor
PMDD	premenstrual dysphoric disorder
PMH	past medical history (see also medical history) perimesencephalic subarachnoid hemorrhage progressive macular hypomelanosis
PMI	point of maximal impulse or apical beat point of maximal intensity
PML	polyoma virus progressive multifocal leukoencephalopathy
PMOS	polyendocrine metabolic ovarian syndrome
PMP	Pseudomyxoma peritonei
PMN	polymorphonuclear leukocytes, that is, neutrophils
PMR	percutaneous myocardial revascularization polymyalgia rheumatica proportionate mortality rate
PM&R	physical medicine and rehabilitation
PMS	premenstrual syndrome
PNA	pneumonia
PNA	postnatal age
PND	paroxysmal nocturnal dyspnea postnasal drip
PNET	primitive neuroectodermal tumor
PNH	paroxysmal nocturnal hemoglobinuria
PNM	perinatal mortality
PNS	Peripheral Nervous System
PNV	Prenatal vitamin
PO	by mouth, that is, orally (from Latin per os)
POA	(Health Care) Power of Attorney
POC	postoperative care products of conception Plan of Care
POCT	Point-Of-Care testing
POD	postoperative days
POEMS	POEMS syndrome (polyneuropathy, organomegaly, endocrinopathy, myeloma protein and skin changes)
POLST	Physician Orders for Life-Sustaining Treatment
poly	polymorphonuclear cells, that is, neutrophils
PONV	postoperative nausea and vomiting
POP	pain on palpation
POP	pelvic organ prolapse
POP	plaster of Paris
POP	progestin only pills
Post	posterior (see anatomical terms of location)
POT	plan of treatment
POTS	postural orthostatic tachycardia syndrome
POX	peroxidase
PP	pulse pressure postpartum, that is, postnatal postprandial
PPA	primary progressive aphasia
PPCS	prolonged post-concussion syndrome
PPD	packs per day (cigarettes) postpartum depression, that is, postnatal depression purified protein derivative or Mantoux test, for tuberculosis testing
PPE	personal protective equipment
PPF	posterior pharyngeal flap
PPGL	pheochromocytoma and paraganglioma
PPH	postpartum haemorrhage primary pulmonary hypertension procedure for prolapse and hemorrhoids
PPHN	persistent pulmonary hypertension of the newborn
PPI	proton pump inhibitor
PPMS	Primary Progressive Multiple Sclerosis
PPROM	preterm prelabor rupture of membranes
PPS	post-polio syndrome
Ppt	precipitate precipitating
PPTCT	prevention of parent-to-child transmission (of HIV) (government of India initiative)
PPTL	postpartum tubal ligation
PPTP	Pediatric preclinical testing program
PPV	positive predictive value positive pressure ventilation
PPx	prophylaxis
PR	prothrombin ratio
p.r.	per rectum (as noun: rectal examination)
PRA	plasma renin activity
PRBC; PRBCs	packed red blood cells
PREA	Pediatric Research Equity Act
Preme	premature infant (see premature birth)
Prep PrEP	preparation pre-exposure prophylaxis
PRES	Posterior reversible encephalopathy syndrome
PRIND	prolonged reversible ischemic neurologic deficit
PRL	prolactin
prn PRN	as necessary (from Latin pro re nata) (if used in chronic pain control, sometimes disparagingly termed "pain relief nil") as needed
Prog	prognosis
PROM	prelabor rupture of membranes partial range of motion
PRP	panretinal photocoagulation platelet-rich plasma progressive rubella panencephalitis
PRRE	purine-rich response element
PRV	polycythemia rubra vera (see polycythemia vera)
PSA	prostate-specific antigen
PBSO	partial small bowel obstruction
PSC	primary sclerosing cholangitis
PSCH	preoperative systemic chemotherapy
PSGN	poststreptococcal glomerulonephritis
PSH	Paroxysmal sympathetic hyperactivity Past surgical history psychosocial history Past medical history (see also medical history)
PSI	Pneumonia severity index
PSP	Phenolsulfonphthalein
PSS	progressive systemic sclerosis (see scleroderma)
PSVT	paroxysmal supraventricular tachycardia
PT	prothrombin time physical therapy (physiotherapy)
Pt.	patient (from Latin patiens, meaning "one who endures" or "one who suffers")
PTA	percutaneous transluminal angioplasty post-traumatic amnesia prior to admission Peritonsillar abscess
PTB	pulmonary tuberculosis
PTC	percutaneous transhepatic cholangiography
PTCA	percutaneous transluminal coronary angioplasty
PTD	prior to discharge preterm delivery
PTH	parathyroid hormone
PTHC	percutaneous transhepatic cholangiography
PTL	preterm labor
PTSD	posttraumatic stress disorder
PTSS	posttraumatic stress syndrome (see posttraumatic stress disorder)
PTT	partial thromboplastin time
PTU	propylthiouracil
PTx	pneumothorax
PU	palindromic unit
PUBS	percutaneous umbilical blood sample
PUD	peptic ulcer disease
PUO	pyrexia of unknown origin
PUVA	psoralen UV A (photochemical ultraviolet light A waves)
p.v.	per vagina (as noun: vaginal examination with manual examination and speculum inspection)
PV	polycythemia vera
PVC (VPC)	premature ventricular contraction
PVD	peripheral vascular disease
PVFS	post-viral fatigue syndrome
PVI	Peripheral vascular insufficiency Pulmonary vein isolation
PVOD	Pulmonary venoocclusive disease
PVR	pulmonary vascular resistance Postvoid residual urine volume
PVS	perivascular space persistent vegetative state pulmonary valve stenosis Plummer–Vinson syndrome
PVT	Paroxysmal ventricular tachycardia
PWD	Pink, warm, and dry (skin assessment)
PWP	pulmonary wedge pressure
Px px	physical examination prognosis patient
P-Y	Pack-year (years of smoking multiplied by average number of packs, or fraction thereof, per day)
PZA	pyrazinamide
