= PSH =

PSH may refer to:

== Science and technology ==
- Paroxysmal sympathetic hyperactivity
- Past surgical history
- Petrograd Standard Hundred, a measure of timber
- PlayStation Home
- Plurisubharmonic function, a class of functions commonly abbreviated to $\mathcal{PSH}.$
- Polythematic structured-subject heading system, controlled vocabulary
- Portable Surgical Hospital
- Prebisch–Singer hypothesis, a hypothesis in economics.
- Psychosocial hypothesis
- Pumped-storage hydroelectricity

== Places ==
- Parma Senior High School
- Pershore railway station, England; National Rail station code PSH
- Primary State Highways (Washington), major state highways in Washington State from 1905 to 1964
- Public Service Hall - а Georgian government agency.

== People ==
- Philip Seymour Hoffman (1967–2014), American actor

== Other ==
- Haitian Socialist Party (French: Parti socialiste haïtien), Haitian political party

== See also ==
- PSSH (disambiguation)
