= Le Fort fracture of skull =

Type of head injury

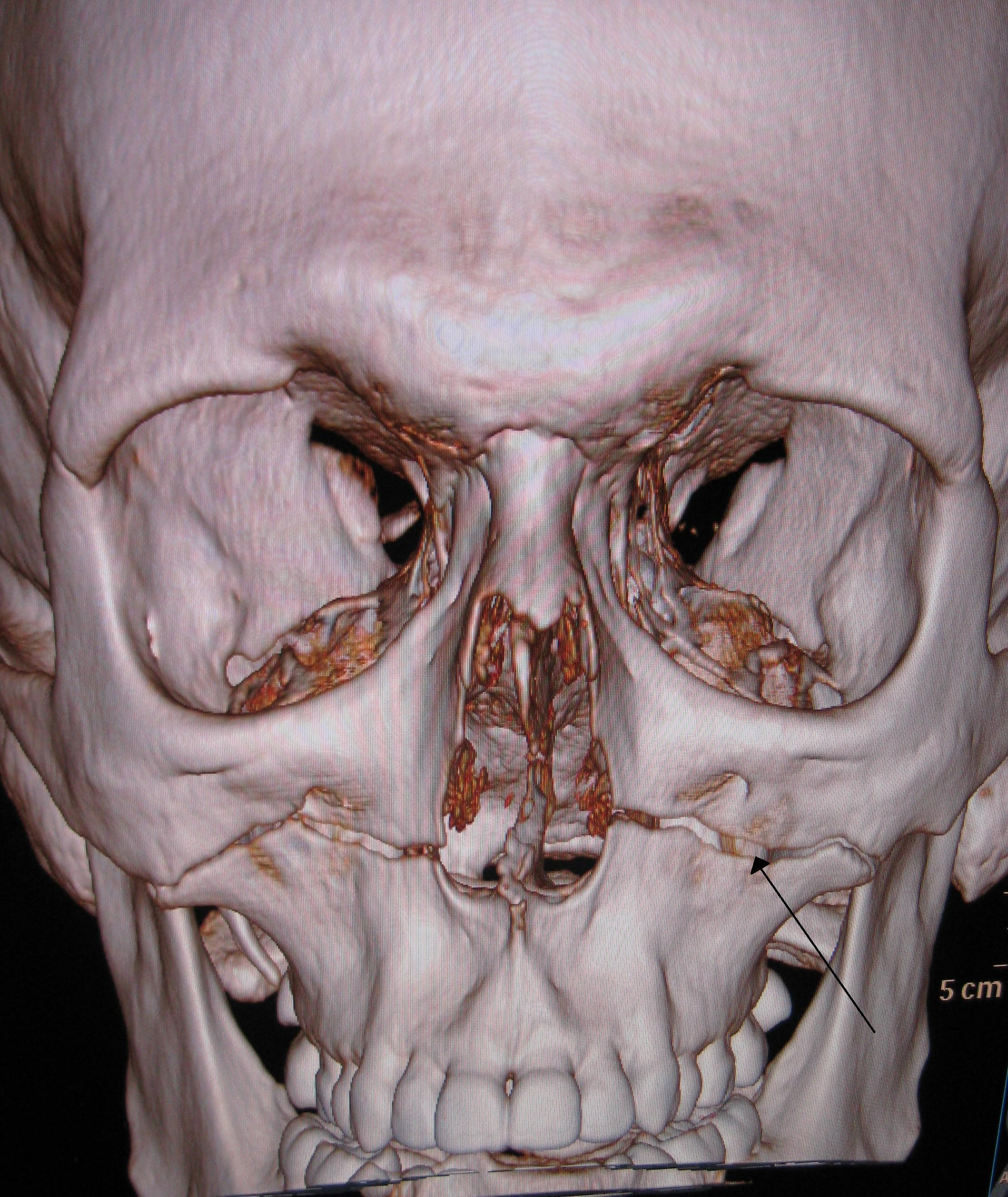
A 3D CT reconstruction showing a Le Fort I fracture (arrow indicates fracture line)

The Le Fort (or LeFort) fractures are a pattern of midface fractures originally described by the French surgeon René Le Fort in the early 1900s. He described three distinct fracture patterns. Although not always applicable to modern-day facial fractures, the Le Fort type fracture classification is still utilized today by medical providers to aid in describing facial trauma for communication, documentation, and surgical planning. Several surgical techniques have been established for facial reconstruction following Le Fort fractures, including maxillomandibular fixation (MMF) and open reduction and internal fixation (ORIF). The main goal of any surgical intervention is to re-establish occlusion, or the alignment of upper and lower teeth, to ensure the patient is able to eat. Complications following Le Fort fractures rely on the anatomical structures affected by the inciding injury.

== Anatomy ==
When discussing the anatomy of the face, it is often divided into thirds. The lower third extends from the chin to approximately the level of the upper teeth. The middle third continues from the teeth to just below the brow line. Finally, the upper third stretches from the brow to the hairline.

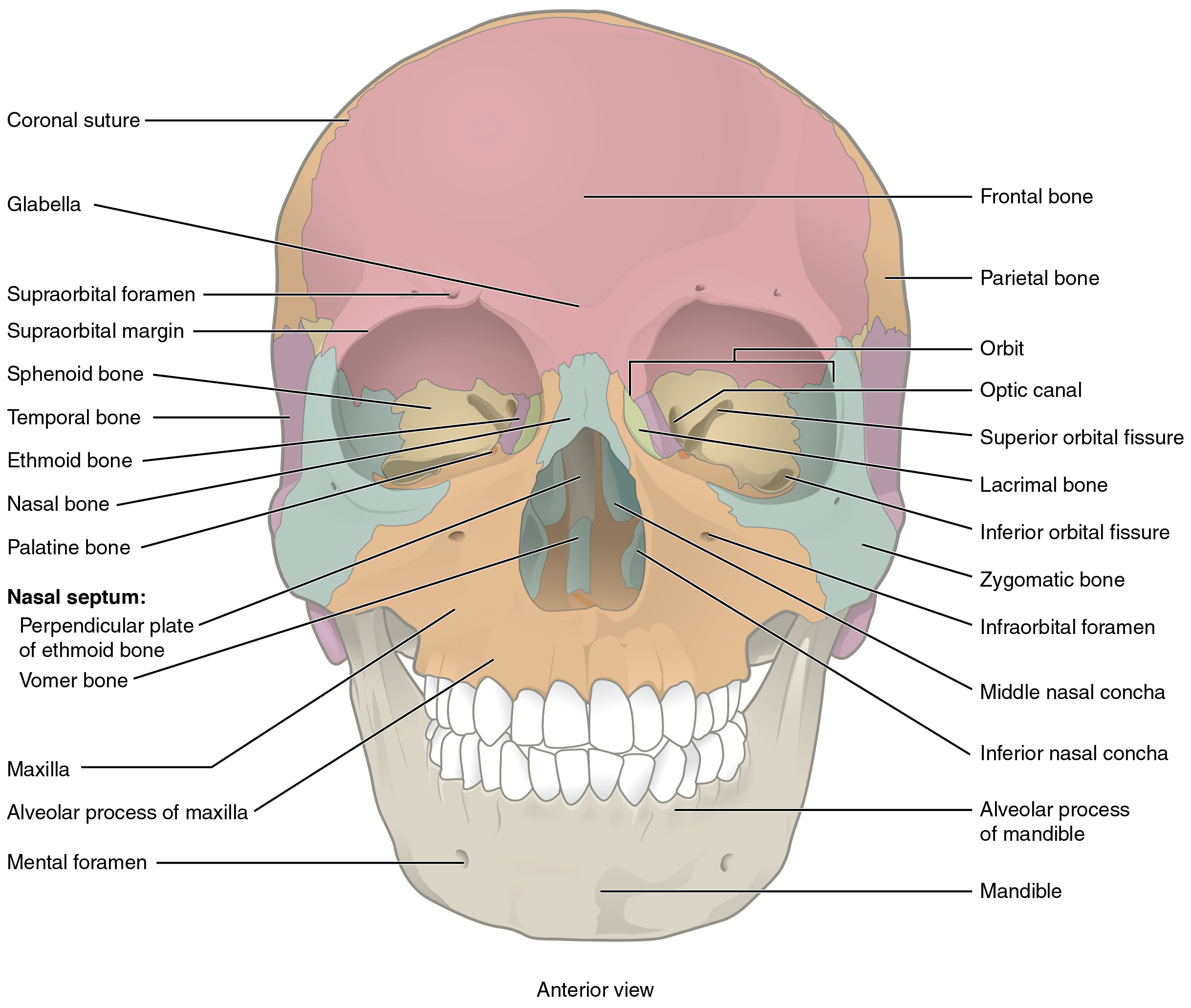
The facial skeleton

The middle third of the face, or the midface, is the anatomical location in which Le Fort fractures occur. It comprises the maxillary bone, palatine bones, zygomas, zygomatic processes (of the temporal bone), ethmoid bone, vomer, nasal concha, nasal bones, and pterygoid processes (of the sphenoid bone).

The maxillary bone contains important anatomical structures which are prone to injury during trauma. The maxillary sinuses are housed within the maxillary bone, and traumatic injury to these sinuses may cause sinus infections, and changes in eye placement and movement. The infraorbital nerve (a terminal branch of CNV2) courses through the maxillary bone and provides sensation to the central face. Additionally, the maxillary bone contains the upper row of teeth (maxillary dentition). Occlusion, or the alignment of upper and lower teeth, is vital following midface trauma to ensure a patient is able to eat and speak.

Facial biomechanics, or the study of forces on the facial bones, plays an important role in midface reconstruction following trauma. Although the biomechanics of the face are not fully understood due to their complex nature, several vertical and horizontal buttresses, or pillars, have been established. These buttresses dissipate the powerful forces the skull endures during biting and chewing.

== Classification ==
=== History and Modern Day Use ===
The Le Fort fractures are a pattern of midface fractures originally described by the French surgeon René Le Fort in the early 1900s. Le Fort studied the effect of facial trauma by dropping cadavers from various heights and recording the different fracture patterns observed. Today, with the evolution of high-speed motor vehicle accidents and advancements in medical imaging and surgical techniques, the low-speed fracture patterns originally described by Le Fort are not always applicable. Modern midface fractures typically do not neatly fit into one of the Le Fort classifications and often occur in combination with other craniofacial trauma. Nevertheless, the Le Fort type fracture classification is still used today as a starting point for describing midface fractures for communication, documentation, and treatment planning.

=== Classification ===
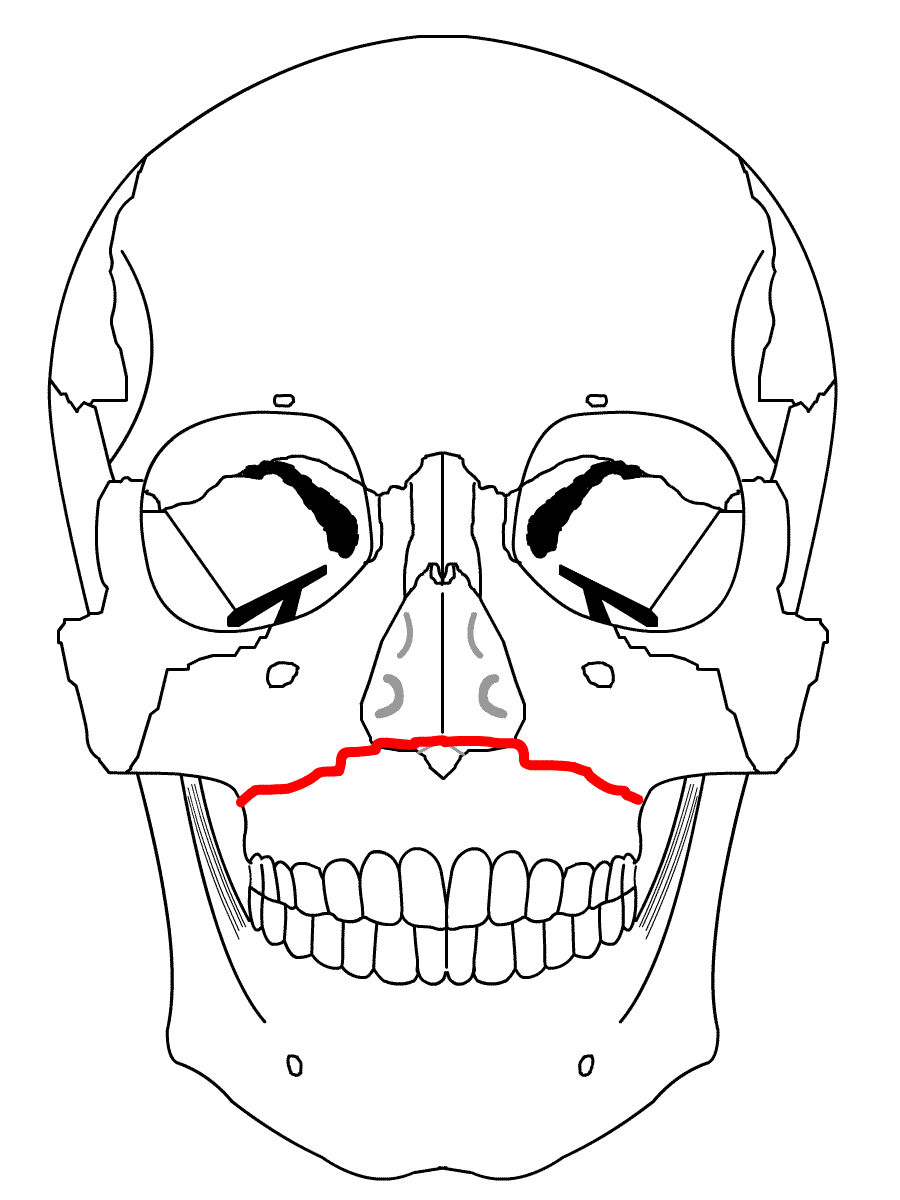
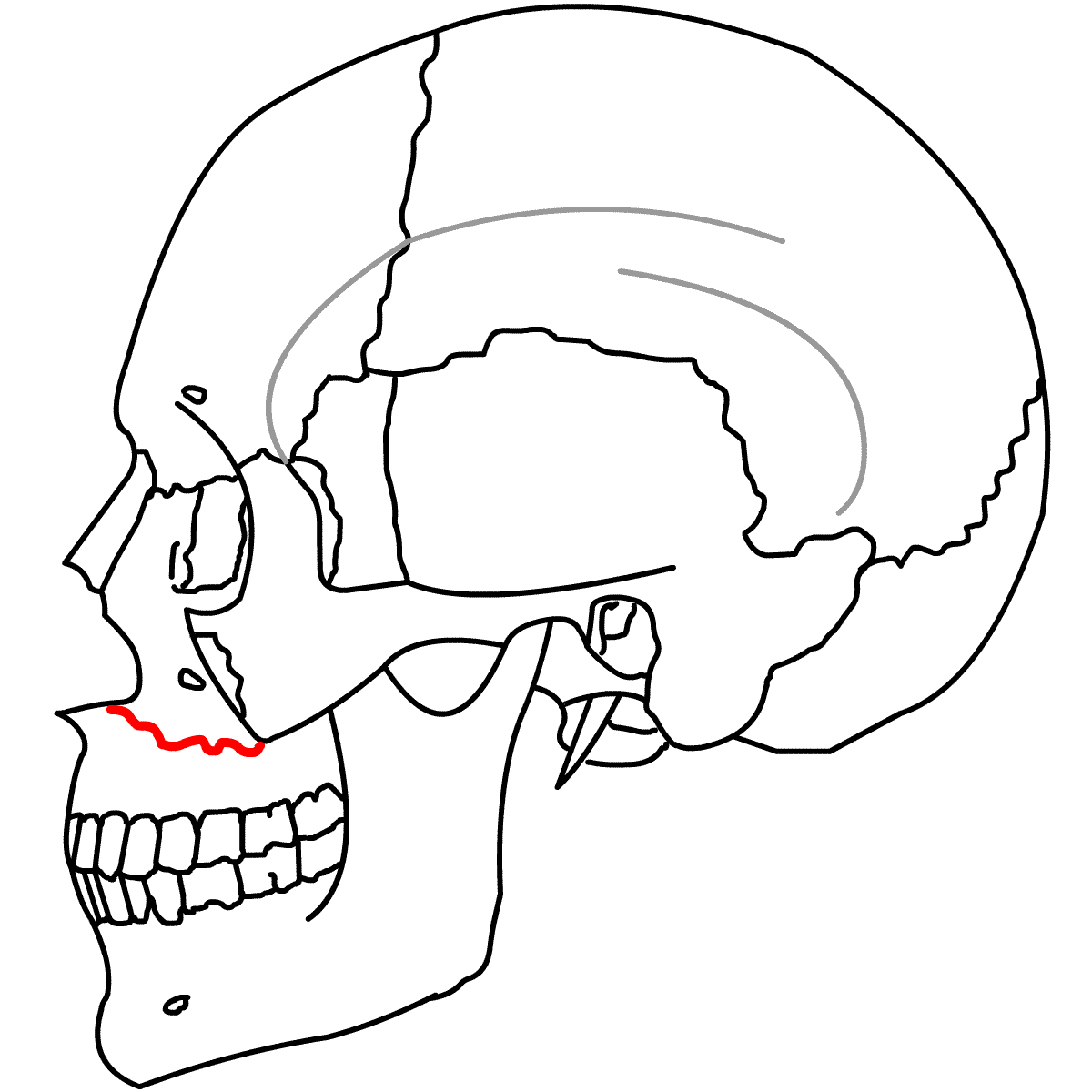
Le Fort I fracture

Traditionally, Le Fort described three types of fractures. All three fractures involve the nasal septum and the pterygoid plates.

- The Le Fort I fracture (horizontal maxillary fracture) consists of a horizontal fracture through the pterygoid plates and maxillary bone between the hard palate and the orbits. Involvement of the nasal aperture differentiates this fracture from the other two Le Forts. Historically, this fracture was eponymically known as a Guérin fracture.
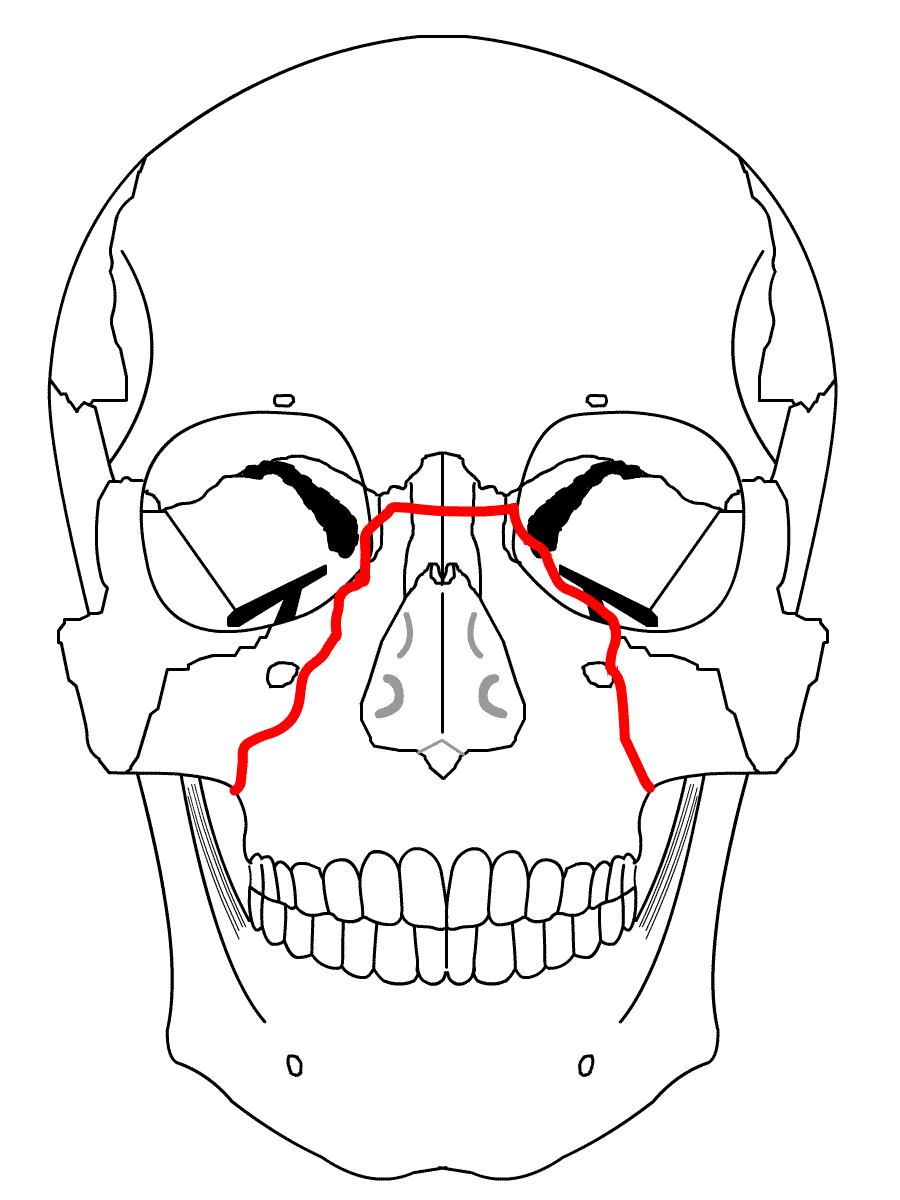
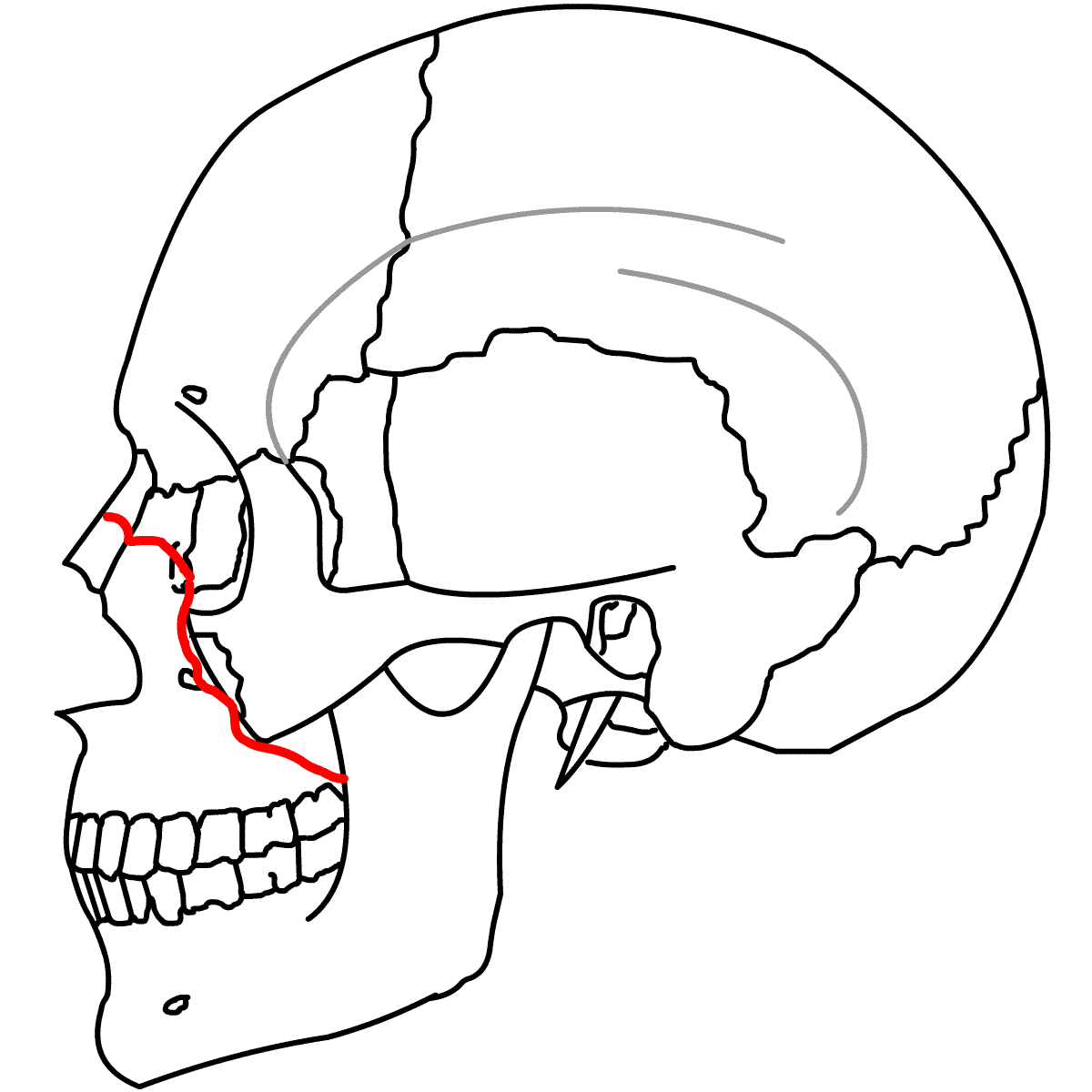
Le Fort II fracture
- The Le Fort II fracture (pyramidal fracture) includes a fracture line from one of the lateral vertical buttresses across the maxillary bone, extending into the inferior orbital rim and crossing the midline (either through the nasal root or nasal bones). The defining feature of this fracture pattern is involvement of the inferior orbital rim. When viewed from the front, this fracture is classically shaped like a pyramid.
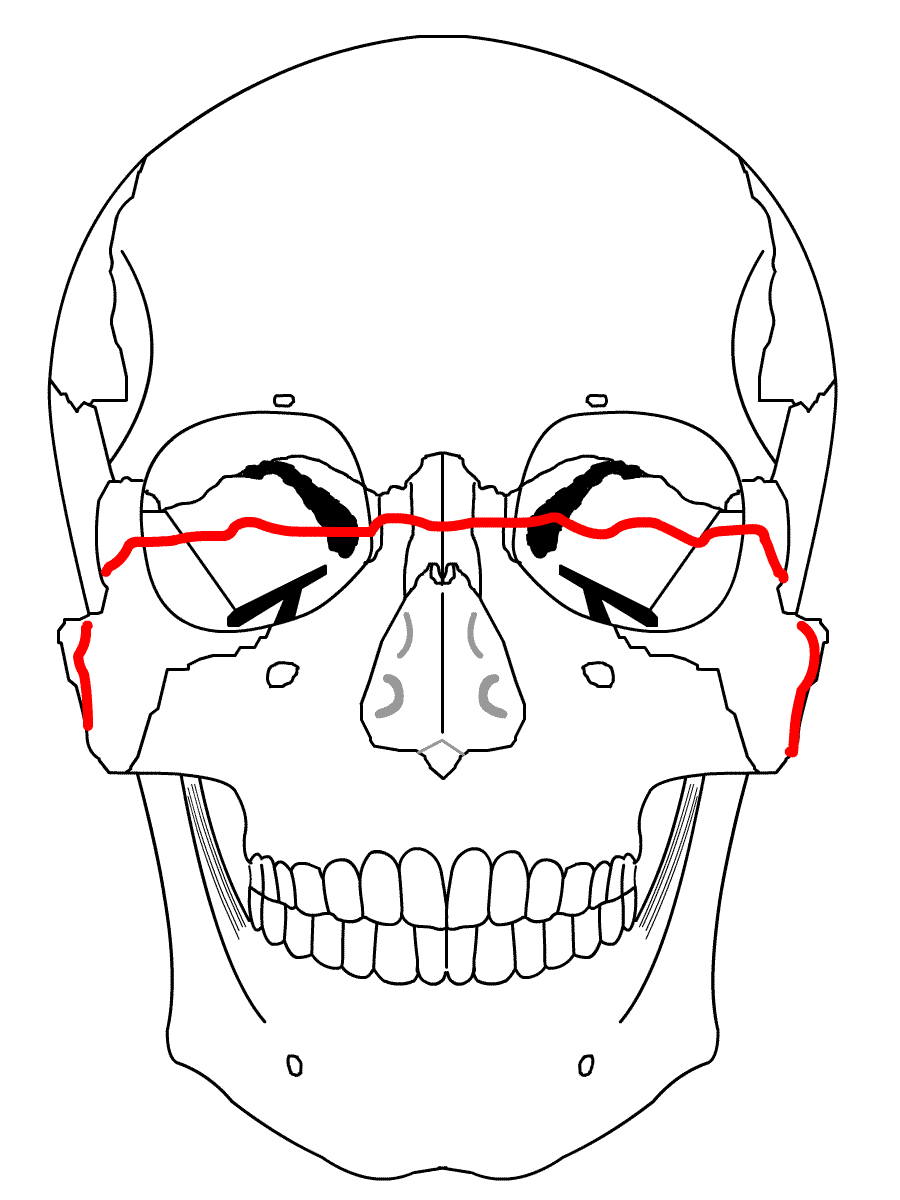
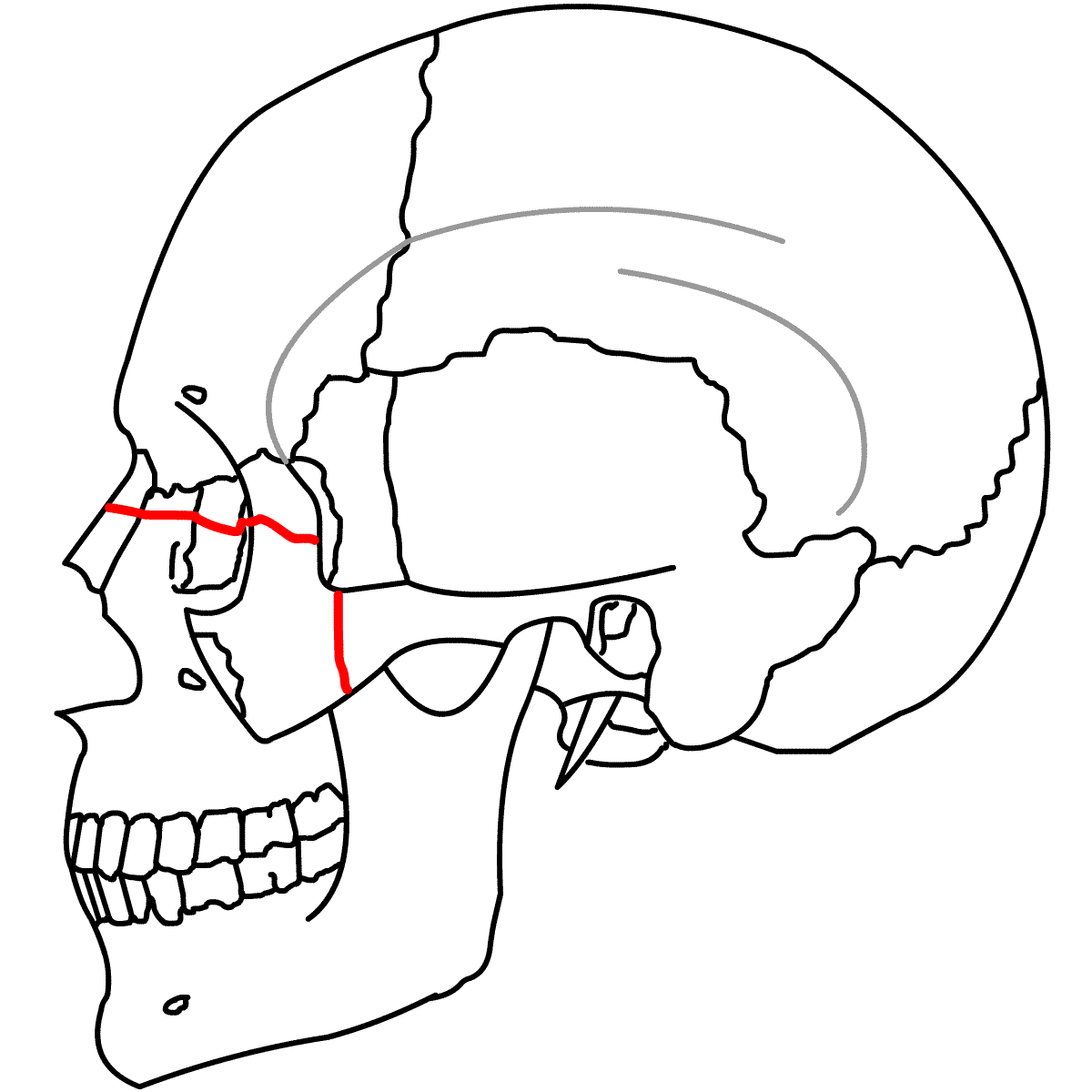
Le Fort III fracture
- The Le Fort III fracture (transverse fracture) occurs at the level of the skull base, resulting in complete craniofacial separation of the midface from the base of the skull. The fracture line extends through the zygomatic arch, the pterygoid plates, the lateral and medial orbital walls, the nasal bones, and the nasal septum. The salient feature of these fractures is that they invariably involve the zygomatic arch, or cheek bone. These are the most extensive of the Le Fort fractures and often require open surgical intervention.

== Patient Evaluation ==
=== Initial Evaluation ===
Every trauma patient presenting to the hospital should first be evaluated according to the Advanced Trauma Life Support (ATLS) protocol, which follows the ABC's (airway, breathing, circulation) of trauma. This includes ensuring the patient is able to breathe, confirming that the patient is actively breathing, and identifying and minimizing major bleeding. Le Fort fractures have the potential to obstruct a patient's airway for a variety of reasons, preventing him or her from being able to breathe. Medical providers should be prepared for emergency airway management should the patient develop an obstructed airway due to bleeding or swelling. Other life-threatening injuries, including those to the brain, spine, or abdomen, should receive prompt evaluation by the appropriate medical specialist.

=== Symptoms and Exam Findings ===
After the initial evaluation is complete and the patient is stable, the patient should be evaluated by a surgeon that specializes in facial trauma, such as a plastic surgeon, an otolaryngologist (ear, nose, and throat surgeon), or an oral and maxillofacial surgeon (OMFS). The surgeon will perform a thorough facial exam, paying special attention to any new-onset facial asymmetry or distortion. Facial swelling and bruising is very common in Le Fort fractures and can make evaluation of facial changes challenging. It can be helpful to have a picture of the patient prior to his or her facial trauma as a comparison.

If the surgeon suspects a Le Fort fracture, they may test for abnormal movement of the maxillary bone by planting one hand on the patient's forehead and using the other hand to press on the roof of the patient's mouth. Movement in the maxillary bone either in isolation or with the nose is suggestive of a Le Fort I or II fracture, respectively.

The cranial nerves (CNs) should be examined if the patient is awake and able to participate in the exam process. The CN exam evaluates facial movement and sensation. Special attention should be made to the fifth CN (CNV) as one of its branches (the infraorbital nerve) courses through the maxillary bone. If this nerve is injured during trauma, it can result in numbness or tingling around the nose or within the mouth.

The surgeon will also examine the patient's mouth for bleeding, swelling, cuts, foreign objects, changes in bite, and newly lost teeth. Additionally, an eye exam assessing vision and pupillary response may be warranted, especially in Le Fort II and III fractures due to the involvement of the orbit. If there is suspicion that the skull base has been injured, such as during a Le Fort III fracture, the patient should be examined for clear drainage from the ear or nose which may be caused by a cerebrospinal fluid (CSF) leak. Abnormal findings during these mouth, eye, ear, or nose exams may require further evaluation.

=== Signs Indicating Further Evaluation ===
If it was determined that the patient lost a tooth during the inciting trauma, the tooth's location should be identified as it could have become lodged in the airway, aspirated into the lungs, or swallowed. If there is concern for an aspirated tooth, an x-ray can confirm the tooth's location. If the eye exam reveals abnormalities in either vision or the pupillary response, prompt evaluation by a neurosurgeon and an ophthalmologist should occur. Skull base injuries can result in a cerebrospinal fluid (CSF) leak, which can present as a clear, metallic-tasting liquid draining from the nose or the ear. If a CSF leak is suspected, the patient should be evaluated by a neurosurgeon.

== Diagnosis ==
Although diagnosis can be suspected by history and physical exam, imaging is required for an accurate diagnosis. A computed tomography (CT) of the face and skull is the imaging of choice for diagnosing Le Fort fractures. CT imaging has greatly replaced the use of plain x-ray as CTs are significantly more likely to show when a fracture is present compared to an x-ray. Additionally, CT imaging is far more useful in visualizing the skeletal injuries in Le Fort fractures than magnetic resonance imaging (MRI). However, MRIs may be useful if there is extensive soft tissue injuries.

== Treatment ==
Surgical treatment of Le Fort fractures is almost always necessary, especially if the fractures are displaced or impact facial functions like eating and speaking. Fractures can be repaired through maxillomandibular fixation (MMF) and/or open reduction and internal fixation (ORIF) after life-threatening injuries have been addressed.

=== Goals of Intervention ===
The primary goal of any intervention is to ensure that a patient is able to eat and speak. This is done by re-establishing occlusion (alignment of upper and lower teeth) and stabilizing facial biomechanics (via the vertical and horizontal facial buttresses discussed previously) to support chewing. Other goals of intervention include restoring cosmetic deformities from the trauma, but this should never be prioritized over re-establishing occlusion.

=== Maxillomandibular Fixation ===
Maxillomandibular fixation (MMF), also known as intermaxiallary fixation (IMF), is a surgical procedure to re-establish occlusion by fixating the upper and lower teeth in their correct position. It can be used in isolation or in combination with open reduction and internal fixation (ORIF) in treating Le Fort fractures. Several surgical techniques exist for establishing MMF, with selection relying on the individual patient injury and surgeon preference. MMF involves fixation of the upper and lower teeth for 6–8 weeks, which limits a patient's ability to speak, eat, breathe through their mouth, and maintain adequate oral hygiene. MMF patients should be provided with wire cutters or scissors for emergency situations. A patient in MMF will be placed on a liquid-only diet during the entirety of their treatment, which may result in weight changes. MMF has some effect on a patient's ability to breathe through their mouth while in place, so patients with a history of pulmonary disease who rely on mouth breathing may not qualify for MMF. Additionally, patients with psychological or seizure disorders may not be good MMF candidates.

=== Open Reduction and Internal Fixation ===
Open reduction and internal fixation (ORIF) is a surgical term that refers to open surgical repair of broken bones. It is required for correction of complex Le Fort fractures affecting facial function or involving neurological complications (visual changes, CSF leak). ORIF is especially important for repairing unstable facial buttresses in order to allow the patient to tolerate chewing. Plates and screws are often permanently fixated to facial bones to stabilize the lateral and medial vertical buttresses bilaterally. Bone grafts may also be required to stabilize the buttresses. ORIF can be used in isolation or in combination with maxillomandibular fixation (MMF) in treating Le Fort fractures. Following surgery, patients may require up to six weeks of rest before they are able to return to the demands of their daily life. As all patients heal slightly differently, ORIF may result in a less-than-ideal correction of facial bones, resulting in poor occlusion or facial asymmetries. Furthermore, as with any surgery, ORIF comes with risk of scarring, nerve injury, and infection.

=== Role of Antibiotics ===
The role of antibiotics in midface trauma is a complex and highly patient-dependent topic. Facial trauma patients with lacerations (or wounds) to the inner lining (mucosa) of the mouth or the nose traditionally have been started on antibiotics as soon as they enter the hospital and have remained on antibiotics for a minimum of 24 hours after surgery. However, some preliminary studies on preoperative antibiotic use suggest that they may not be necessary to prevent bacterial infections, though these are based on small patient populations and are not strong enough studies to set specific recommendations regarding preoperative antibiotic use. Therefore, patients are still often placed on antibiotics before surgery, especially if they are at an increased risk of developing infection (including, but not limited to, patients that are elderly, tobacco users, diabetic, and/or immunocompromised). If a patient is begun on antibiotics, it is difficult to determine how long they should remain on antibiotics postoperatively. Although multiple studies have been performed examining postoperative antibiotic use, they have come to contradicting conclusions. The more recent studies have suggested that antibiotics may not have any advantage in preventing postoperative bacterial infections. However, these studies acknowledge that their results are based predominantly on the young, healthy, male patients with non-specific facial trauma that make up the majority of the studies' participants and may not be applicable to the everyone experiencing midface trauma. With limited studies specifically on midface trauma, no standards for postoperative antibiotic use has been determined. The use of postoperative antibiotics relies on the surgeon's clinical recommendations and individual patient risk factors.

== Prognosis ==
Longterm outcomes of Le Fort fractures depend on the severity and location of the fracture. The most common complication of Le Fort fractures include imperfect fracture reduction resulting in poor dental occlusion. Other longterm effects of Le Fort fractures include various nerve injuries, either from the inciting injury or from surgical correction, resulting in facial movement and sensory deficits. If one or both of the maxillary sinuses are injured during the trauma, it can result in chronic sinus infections or injuries to the eye which may require further surgical correction. Le Fort III fractures that injure the optic nerve or the extraocular muscles that move the eye may result in visual defects.

== See also ==
- Facial trauma
- René Le Fort
- Zygomaticomaxillary complex fracture
- Oral and maxillofacial surgery
- Mandibular fracture
- Le Fort osteotomy
