= Adrenergic storm =

Sudden increase in adrenaline and noradrenaline in the blood

- Other names: Sympathomimetic toxicity, sympathomimetic toxidrome
- Symptoms: Tachycardia, hyperkinesia, hypertension
- Complications: Hyperthermia, rhabdomyolysis, arrhythmia, heart attack, psychosis, delirium, kidney failure
- Causes: Cocaine, stimulant overdose, subarachnoid hemorrhage, methamphetamine, eating foods high in tyramine while taking MAOIs, rabies
- Treatment: Benzodiazepines (e.g., diazepam), beta blockers, antihypertensives

An adrenergic storm is a sudden and dramatic increase in serum levels of the catecholamines adrenaline and noradrenaline (also known as epinephrine and norepinephrine respectively), with a less significant increase in dopamine transmission. It is a life-threatening condition because of extreme tachycardia and hypertension, and is especially dire for those with prior heart problems. If treatment is prompt, prognosis is good; typically large amounts of diazepam or other benzodiazepines are administered alongside beta blockers. Beta blockers are contraindicated in some patients, so other antihypertensive medication such as clonidine may be used. Antipsychotics are also used to treat the most severe psychiatric reactions such as psychosis, paranoia or terror, after their use was formerly discouraged because of their potential to prolong the QT interval; however, more recent research performed since 2019 has revealed that this and other severe side effects are rare and their occurrence does not warrant banning antipsychotics from the treatment of adrenergic crises for which they can be extremely useful.

Adrenergic storms are usually caused by overdoses of stimulants, especially cocaine or methamphetamine, or eating foods high in tyramine while taking monoamine oxidase inhibitors. A subarachnoid hemorrhage can also cause an adrenergic storm. A catecholamine storm is part of the normal course of rabies infection, and is responsible for the severe feelings of agitation, terror, and dysautonomia present in the pre-coma stage of the disease.

== Signs and symptoms ==
The behavioral symptoms are similar to those of an amphetamine, cocaine, or caffeine overdose. Overstimulation of the central nervous system results in a state of hyperkinetic movement and unpredictable mental status including mania, rage and suicidal behavior; hyperthermia is also prominently present. Delirium can also be present but rarely.

Physical symptoms are more serious and include heart arrhythmias as well as outright heart attack or stroke in people who are at risk of coronary disease. Breathing is rapid and shallow while both pulse and blood pressure are dangerously elevated.

Other complications would include rhabdomyolysis, a breakdown of the voluntary muscles because of the excessive physical movement, causing the components of the muscle, most notably myoglobin, to be released into the bloodstream and then clog the kidneys, causing renal failure. In all, rhabdomyolysis is especially common in adrenergic storms caused by the use of stimulant drugs, most notably those of the phenethylamines such as cathinones or amphetamines.

== Causes ==
There are several known causes of adrenergic storms; in the United States, cocaine overdose is the leading cause. Any stimulant drug has the capacity to cause this syndrome if taken in sufficient doses, but even non-psychotropic drugs can very rarely provoke a reaction.

Monoamine oxidase inhibitors (MAOIs) are a class of drugs that inhibit the enzyme monoamine oxidase. This enzyme is responsible for breaking down many compounds; basically, anything with a primary amine moiety is likely to be oxidized by monoamine oxidase. An important substrate of the enzyme MAO is tyramine. MAOIs inhibit the enzyme either reversibly, in which MAO is inhibited only until the drug is cleared from the system, or irreversibly, in which the substrate binds permanently to the enzyme, rendering it inactive and effectively destroying it. Irreversible MAOIs are potentially more dangerous, because the body takes about two weeks to regenerate MAO enzymes to functional levels. Two subtypes of MAO exist: MAO-A and MAO-B; this is relevant to adrenergic storms, as there are significant differences between the two types, such as their differential expression throughout the body, and range of substrates. While both MAO-A and MAO-B metabolize tyramine, only MAO-A is present in the gastrointestinal tract and singularly metabolizes the majority of consumed tyramine. (The small portion normally passing into circulation is mostly degraded in the liver where both MAO types act.)

Subarachnoid hemorrhage is an extremely serious condition in which a neural membrane is breached and the brain itself is compromised. The onset is sudden, described as "the worst headache of one's life," and many grave symptoms follow. Adrenergic storm is often present among these symptoms, and is responsible for some of the dangers, both long-term and short, of subarachnoid hemorrhage adrenergic storm, through a complex cascade of processes starting with the movement of subarachnoid blood into the brain. Apparently, as the intracranial pressure increases, the brain is squeezed and catecholamines are forced out of their vesicles into the synapses and extracellular space.

=== Rare causes ===
Rarely, a pheochromocytoma (tumor of the medullar tissue of the adrenal glands, which are located anterior to the kidney), may result in an adrenergic storm. This type of tumor is not common to begin with, and furthermore, the subtype that can cause massive adrenaline release is rarer still. Patients with pheochromocytoma can unexpectedly fly into a rage or sink into trembling fear, possibly dangerous to themselves and others as their judgment is impaired, their senses and pain threshold are heightened, and the level of the adrenaline in their bloodstream is more than most people ever experience; pheochromocytoma can, very rarely, kill by internal adrenaline overdose. But overall, adrenergic storm is an uncommon but certainly not rare phenomenon associated with the also uncommon condition of pheochromocytoma.

== Diagnosis ==
=== Differential diagnosis ===
Because the adrenergic storm overlaps with so many other similar conditions, such as hypertensive crises, stimulant intoxication or overdose, or even panic attack, and because the treatments for these overlapping conditions are largely alike, it is not necessary to obtain a differential and definitive diagnosis before initiating treatment. However, analysis of the patient's medical history, checked against the possible causes of the adrenergic storm such as those above, should be done, because some adrenergic storms can be caused by serious underlying conditions. If a patient has an adrenergic storm and all or most of the other factors are ruled out, the adrenergic storm could lead to the discovery of a pheochromocytoma, which can become malignant. However, not all cases of adrenergic storm have an identifiable cause.

Serotonin syndrome, in which an excess of serotonin in the synapses causes a similar crisis of hypertension and mental confusion, could be confused with an adrenergic storm. Serotonin, being a tryptamine (non-catecholamine) involved in higher brain functions, can cause dangerous hypertension and tachycardia from its effects on the sympathetic nervous system. Symptoms caused by excessive adrenergic signalling can occur alongside those of serotonergic signalling. Abnormal echocardiograms or chest pain are indicative of adrenergic storm. On the other hand, uncontrollable slow, rhythmic, or jerky movements, contractions and tension—often in every part of the body, dangerously high fever, eye rolling, and bruxism are more indicative of serotonin syndrome.

== Treatment ==
If there is evidence of overdose or it is suspected, the patient should be given gastric lavage, activated charcoal, or both; this could make the difference between life and death in a close situation. It can however aggravate the patient which should be taken into account.

The first-line treatments are diazepam and a non-selective beta blocker; other antihypertensive drugs may also be used. Not all benzodiazepines and beta blockers are safe to use in an adrenergic storm; for instance, alprazolam and propranolol; alprazolam weakly agonizes dopamine receptors and causes catecholamine release while propranolol mildly promotes some catecholamine release – each worsening the condition.

Antipsychotics are also used to treat the psychiatric symptoms such as aggression, agitation, psychosis, paranoia, or anxiety. Originally, the use of antipsychotics was discouraged because of their potential to prolong the QT interval; however, newer research has revealed that their careful use does not carry the potential for any significant side effects and today their judicious use is encouraged.

Adrenergic storms are often idiopathic in nature; however if there is an underlying condition, then that must be addressed after bringing the heart rate and blood pressure down.

== See also ==
- Adrenal crisis
- Paroxysmal sympathetic hyperactivity
- Sympathomimetic drug
- Takotsubo cardiomyopathy
