= Cranial nerve examination =

Type of neurological examination

- One component of the examination (III) uses the pupillary light reflex to assess the status of the oculomotor nerve (CNIII).
- Purpose: part of the neurological examination

The cranial nerve exam is a type of neurological examination. It is used to identify problems with the cranial nerves by physical examination. It has nine components. Each test is designed to assess the status of one or more of the twelve cranial nerves (I-XII). These components correspond to testing the sense of smell (I), visual fields and acuity (II), eye movements (III, IV, VI) and pupils (III, sympathetic and parasympathetic), sensory function of face (V), strength of facial (VII) and shoulder girdle muscles (XI), hearing and balance (VII, VIII), taste (VII, IX, X), pharyngeal movement and reflex (IX, X), tongue movements (XII).

== Components ==
=== CN I ===
The first test is for the olfactory nerve. Smell is tested in each nostril separately by placing stimuli under one nostril and occluding the opposing nostril. The stimuli used should be non-irritating and identifiable. Some example stimuli include cinnamon, cloves, and toothpaste. Loss of the sense of smell is called anosmia and can be either unilateral or bilateral. Bilateral loss can occur with rhinitis, smoking, or aging. Unilateral loss indicates a possible nerve lesion or deviated septum. This test is usually skipped on a cranial nerve exam.

The short axons of the first cranial nerve regenerate on a regular basis. The neurons in the olfactory epithelium have a limited life span, and new cells grow to replace the ones that die off. The axons from these neurons grow back into the CNS by following the existing axons—representing one of the few examples of such growth in the mature nervous system. If all of the fibers are sheared when the brain moves within the cranium, such as in a motor vehicle accident, then no axons can find their way back to the olfactory bulb to re-establish connections. If the nerve is not completely severed, the anosmia may be temporary as new neurons can eventually reconnect.

=== CN II ===
Vision via the optic nerve is examined both in fields of vision, and in clarity of vision.

- Visual fields are assessed by asking the patient to cover one eye while the examiner tests the opposite eye. The examiner wiggles the finger in each of the four quadrants and asks the patient to state when the finger is seen in the periphery. The examiner's visual fields should be normal, since it is used as the baseline. The optic nerves from both sides enter the cranium through the respective optic canals and meet at the optic chiasm at which fibers sort such that the two halves of the visual field are processed by the opposite sides of the brain. Deficits in visual field perception often suggest damage along the length of the optic pathway between the orbit and the diencephalon. For example, loss of peripheral vision may be the result of a pituitary tumor pressing on the optic chiasm. The pituitary, seated in the sella turcica of the sphenoid bone, is directly inferior to the optic chiasm. The axons that decussate in the chiasm are from the medial retinae of either eye, and therefore carry information from the peripheral visual field.
- Visual acuity is tested in each eye separately. Ensure the patient's vision is corrected with eyeglasses or a pinhole. The patient is asked to read progressively smaller lines on the near card or Snellen chart. The Snellen Chart demonstrates visual acuity by presenting standard Roman letters in a variety of sizes. The result of this test is a rough generalization of the acuity of a person based on the normal accepted acuity, such that a letter that subtends a visual angle of 5 minutes of an arc at 20 feet can be seen. To have 20/60 vision, for example, means that the smallest letters that a person can see at a 20-foot distance could be seen by a person with normal acuity from 60 feet away. Testing the extent of the visual field means that the examiner can establish the boundaries of peripheral vision as simply as holding their hands out to either side and asking the patient when the fingers are no longer visible without moving the eyes to track them. If it is necessary, further tests can establish the perceptions in the visual fields. Physical inspection of the optic disk, or where the optic nerve emerges from the eye, can be accomplished by looking through the pupil with an ophthalmoscope.

=== CN III, CN IV, CN VI ===
The three nerves that control the extraocular muscles are the oculomotor nerve (CN III), the trochlear nerve (CN IV), and the abducens nerve (CN VI). As the name suggests, the abducens nerve is responsible for abducting the eye, which it controls through contraction of the lateral rectus muscle. The trochlear nerve controls the superior oblique muscle to rotate the eye along its axis in the orbit medially, which is called intorsion, and is a component of focusing the eyes on an object close to the face. The oculomotor nerve controls all the other extraocular muscles, as well as a muscle of the upper eyelid. Movements of the two eyes need to be coordinated to locate and track visual stimuli accurately. When moving the eyes to locate an object in the horizontal plane, or to track movement horizontally in the visual field, the lateral rectus muscle of one eye and medial rectus muscle of the other eye are both active. The lateral rectus is controlled by neurons of the abducens nucleus in the superior medulla, whereas the medial rectus is controlled by neurons in the oculomotor nucleus of the midbrain.

- Eye movements are tested by standing one meter in front of the patient and asking the patient to follow a target with eyes only, and not the head. The target is moved in an "H" shape and the patient is asked to report any diplopia. Then, the target is held at the lateral ends of the patient's visual field. Nystagmus is tested for. One or two beats is a normal finding. The accommodation reflex is tested by moving the target towards the patient's nose. As the eyes converge, the pupils should constrict. The optokinetic nystagmus test is optional and involves asking the patient to look at a strip of vertical lines moving horizontally across visual field. Nystagmus is normally observed.
- Extraocular movements are tested by inspecting for ptosis, eye position and nystagmus. The pupil size is measured, its shape and any asymmetry is tested. A commonly used abbreviation to describe normal pupils is PERRLA (pupils equal, round and reactive to light and accommodation).
- Pupillary light reflex is tested by having the patient stare into the distance as the examiner shines the penlight obliquely into each pupil. Pupillary constriction is tested for on the eye examined (direct response) and on the opposite eye (consensual response). The swinging flashlight test involves moving the light between the two pupils. Normally both direct and consensual responses are elicited when the light shines on an eye, and some dilation will occur during the swing between.

=== CN V ===
Testing the trigeminal nerve involves testing its three branches.

- Light touch is tested in each of the three divisions of the trigeminal nerve and on each side of the face using a cotton wisp or tissue paper. The ophthalmic division is tested by touching the forehead, the maxillary division is tested by touching the cheeks, and the mandibular division is tested by touching the chin. Be careful not to test the mandibular division too laterally, as the mandible is innervated by the great auricular nerve (C2 and C3). A common mistake is to use a stroking motion, which will trigger pain and temperature nerves. Instead, a point stimulus should be applied. For pain and temperature repeat the same steps as light touch but use a sharp object and a cold tuning fork respectively.
- Corneal reflex is conducted along with the facial nerve section of the test. Note the sensory innervation of the cornea is provided by the trigeminal nerve while the motor innervation for blinking the eye is provided by the facial nerve.-
- Muscles of mastication (temporalis, masseter) should be inspected for atrophy. Palpate the temporalis and masseter as the patient clenches the jaw. The pterygoids can be tested by asking the patient to keep the mouth open against resistance, and move from side to side against resistance. A jaw jerk reflex can be tested by placing a finger over the patient's chin and then tapping the finger with a reflex hammer. Normally the jaw moves minimally.

=== CN VII ===
The facial nerve is tested by inspecting for facial asymmetry and involuntary movements. The individual is asked to:

1. Raise both eyebrows
2. Frown
3. Close both eyes tightly so that you can not open them. Test muscular strength by trying to open them
4. Show both upper and lower teeth
5. Smile
6. Puff out both cheeks

The sensory component is tested for taste. Testing this is as simple as introducing salty, sour, bitter, or sweet stimuli to either side of the tongue. The patient should respond to the taste stimulus before retracting the tongue into the mouth. Stimuli applied to specific locations on the tongue will dissolve into the saliva and may stimulate taste buds connected to either the left or right of the nerves, masking any lateral deficits.

=== CN VIII ===
The vestibulocochlear nerve is tested for hearing and balance.

- Hearing is tested by whispering numbers in one ear as patient covers the other and ask the patient to repeat the numbers. Alternatively, have patient close their eyes and say "left" or "right" depending on the side from which they hear the sound. Vigorously rub fingers together in one ear at a time to produce rustling sound.

More sensitive hearing tests are Rinne test and Weber test. The Rinne test involves using a tuning fork to distinguish between conductive hearing and sensorineural hearing. Conductive hearing relies on vibrations being conducted through the ossicles of the middle ear. Sensorineural hearing is the transmission of sound stimuli through the neural components of the inner ear and cranial nerve. A vibrating tuning fork is placed on the mastoid process and the patient indicates when the sound produced from this is no longer present. Then the fork is immediately moved to just next to the ear canal so the sound travels through the air. If the sound is not heard through the ear, meaning the sound is conducted better through the temporal bone than through the ossicles, a conductive hearing deficit is present.

The Weber test also uses a tuning fork to differentiate between conductive versus sensorineural hearing loss. In this test, the tuning fork is placed at the top of the skull, and the sound of the tuning fork reaches both inner ears by travelling through bone. In a healthy patient, the sound would appear equally loud in both ears. With unilateral conductive hearing loss, however, the tuning fork sounds louder in the ear with hearing loss. This is because the sound of the tuning fork has to compete with background noise coming from the outer ear, but in conductive hearing loss, the background noise is blocked in the damaged ear, allowing the tuning fork to sound relatively louder in that ear. With unilateral sensorineural hearing loss, however, damage to the cochlea or associated nervous tissue means that the tuning fork sounds quieter in that ear.

- Vestibular Function

=== CN IX, CN X ===
The glossopharyngeal nerve (CN IX) and vagus nerve (CN X) are tested for:

- Gag response
- Visualizing uvula deviation away from affected side on articulating "AHH" with tongue depressor.
- Palatal articulation "KA"
- Guttural articulation "GO"

=== CN XI ===
The accessory nerve is tested for:

- Shrug shoulders (trapezius muscle)
- Turn head from side to side (sternocleidomastoid muscle)

=== CN XII ===
The hypoglossal nerve has a sole motor function for most of the muscles of the tongue:

- Stick out tongue and move it to one side, then the other
- Inspect for tongue atrophy, fasciculations or asymmetry in movement or appearance.

== See also ==
- Cranial nerves
- Cranial nerve nucleus
