= Progressive macular hypomelanosis =

- Specialty: Dermatology

Progressive macular hypomelanosis is a common skin condition, a disorder, observed more frequently in young women with darkly pigmented skin who originate from or reside in tropical climates.

An interesting property of the skin condition is that it can be easily identified using a Wood's lamp. The lack of pigment results and a clear observation of homogeneous white areas, while the involvement of Cutibacterium acnes will show an orange fluorescence due to its coproporphyrin III. That way it can be differentiated from other hypopigmentary disorders such as vitiligo."

== See also ==
- Riehl melanosis
- List of cutaneous conditions
