= PSSH =

PSSH may refer to:

== Cognitive Science ==
- Physical symbol system

== Organizations ==
- Socialist Party of Albania

== Digital Rights Management standards ==
- Protection System Specific Header
