= Progressive rubella panencephalitis =

- Specialty: Infectious disease
- Frequency: 0.0001%

Progressive rubella panencephalitis (PRP) is a neurological disorder which may occur in a child with congenital rubella. It is a slow viral infection of the brain characterized by chronic encephalitis, usually manifesting between 8–19 years of age. It is believed to be due to a persistence or reactivation of rubella virus infection.

== Cause ==
It develops 6 months to 4 years after the primary rubella infection, which in most cases is a congenital rubella. In children with congenital rubella infection the deficits remain stable; neurological deterioration after the first few years of life is not believed to occur.

Progression of the disease can be divided into two stages:

- 1st stage: Behavioural Changes
  - insidious onset
  - subtle changes in behaviour and declining school work
- 2nd stage: Neurological Changes
  - seizures – sometimes myoclonic
  - cerebellar ataxia
  - spastic weakness
  - retinopathy, optic atrophy
  - frank dementia leading to coma
  - spasticity and brainstem involvement with death in 2–5 years

== Diagnosis ==
The diagnosis is considered when a child with congenital rubella develops progressive spasticity, ataxia, mental deterioration, and seizures. Testing involves at least CSF examination and serology. Elevated CSF total protein and globulin and elevated rubella antibody titers in CSF and serum occur. CT may show ventricular enlargement due to cerebellar atrophy and white matter disease. Brain biopsy may be necessary to exclude other causes of encephalitis or encephalopathy. Rubella virus cannot usually be recovered by viral culture or immunohistologic testing.

== Treatment ==
Although no specific treatment exists, the disease can be managed with anticonvulsants, physiotherapy, etc.

== Incidence ==
PRP is very rare and similar to SSPE but without intracellular inclusion bodies. Only 20 patients have been identified since first recognized in 1974.

== See also ==
- Subacute sclerosing panencephalitis
