= René Le Fort =

French surgeon

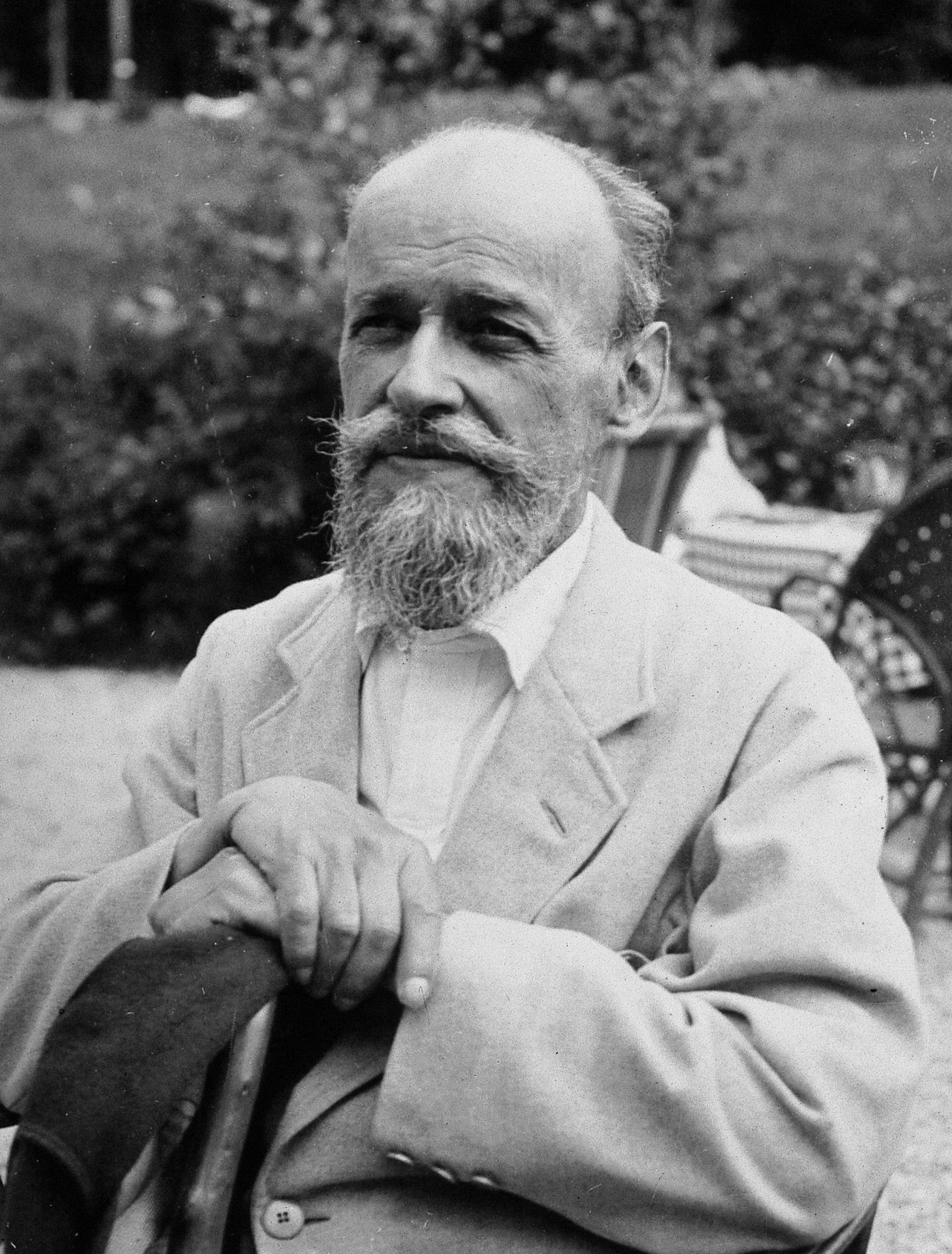
- René Le Fort
- Born: 30 March 1869
- Died: 30 March 1951 (aged 82)
- Known for: Classification of fractures of the face

René Le Fort (French: [ʁəne lə fɔʁ]; 30 March 1869 – 30 March 1951) was a French surgeon from Lille known for creating a classification for fractures of the face.

== Early life ==
René Le Fort was born in 1869, in Lille. His father was a physician and his uncle a renowned surgeon, Léon Clément Le Fort.

When he was 19 and a military student, he was awarded first place into the Internat des Hôpitaux de Lille. Two years later, he was the youngest in France to receive an MD.

== Career ==
After earning his medical degree with a treatise titled Topographie cranio-cérébrale avec applications chirurgicales, he served as a medical resident followed by work as a military surgeon for the French army hospital at Val-de-Grâce. In 1899 he began teaching classes at the medical university in Lille. At the outbreak of the First Balkan War (1912), he re-joined the army as a military physician. During World War I he received a commendation for bravery for his actions at the Battle of Dinant. He spent the last two years of the war in Versailles largely dealing with breast cancer and heart disease issues.

In 1919 he worked at the Hôpital des Invalides prior to returning to Lille the following year. Here he became a professor at the surgical department for pediatric surgery and orthopedics. He was also a volunteer at the sanatorium in Zuydcoote, where he researched treatments for bone tuberculosis. In 1936 he was awarded the Prix Laborie and elected president of the Société française de chirurgie et orthopédique. In 1937 he went into retirement, but during World War II returned to the University of Lille to replace former colleagues who were part of the war effort.

== Le Fort Fractures of skull ==
In 1901 René Le Fort published a treatise called Étude expérimentale sur les fractures de la mâchoire supérieure involving his experiments with maxillary fractures of the skull. To perform these experiments, Le Fort caused trauma to either attached or decapitated cadaver heads, and delivered blunt forces of varying degrees of magnitude and from different directions. Although a common story holds that Le Fort used cannonballs to induce blunt trauma, he actually used a combination of wooden club, cast iron rod, squeezing in a vice, kicks, or simply throwing the heads against a table. From these tests, he determined that predictable patterns of fractures are the result of certain types of injuries, and concluded that there are three predominant types of mid-face fractures.

- "Le Fort I fractures": (horizontal) A fracture of the maxilla immediately above the teeth and palate.
- "Le Fort II fractures": (pyramidal) The result of a blow to the lower or mid maxilla.
- "Le Fort III fractures": (transverse) Also called craniofacial separation, the result of impact to the nasal bridge or upper maxilla.

In some instances, maxillary fractures are a combination of two or three Le Fort types. Although this system of classification is considered somewhat simplistic today, it is still widely used in oral and maxillofacial surgery. It was modified by Robert D Marciani in 1993 to more precisely define Le Fort fracture patterns.

== Selected writings ==
- Étude expérimentale sur les fractures de la mâchoire supérieure (1901)
- Les Projectiles inclus dans le mediastin (1918)
