= Paroxysmal sympathetic hyperactivity =

Syndrome that causes episodes of increased activity of the sympathetic nervous system

- Specialty: Neurology
- Symptoms: Sudden, recurrent periods of tachycardia, sweating, hyperthermia, hypertension, tachypnea, dystonia, pupil dilation, flushing
- Causes: Traumatic brain injury, stroke, hypoxia, spinal cord injury
- Treatment: Medication
- Medication: Beta blockers, opioids, benzodiazepines, clonidine, baclofen, dantrolene

Paroxysmal sympathetic hyperactivity (PSH) is a syndrome that causes episodes of increased activity of the sympathetic nervous system. Hyperactivity of the sympathetic nervous system can manifest as increased heart rate, increased respiration, high blood pressure, perspiration, and hyperthermia. Previously, this syndrome has been identified as general dysautonomia, but now is considered a specific form of it. It has also been referred to as paroxysmal sympathetic instability with dystonia (PAID) and sympathetic storm, however, studies have adopted the name paroxysmal sympathetic hyperactivity to ensure specificity. PSH is observed more in younger patients than older ones. It is also seen more commonly in men than women. In patients surviving traumatic brain injury, the occurrence of these episodes is one in every three. PSH can also be associated with severe anoxia, subarachnoid and intracerebral hemorrhage, and hydrocephalus.

== Signs and symptoms ==
Characteristics of paroxysmal sympathetic hyperactivity include:

- fever
- tachycardia
- hypertension
- tachypnea
- hyperhidrosis
- dystonic posturing
- pupillary dilation
- flushing

Episodes can occur naturally or arise from external triggers. Common triggers include pain or stimulation, body turning or movements, and bladder distention. Bladder distention has been observed in patients being treated in intensive care units with the concurrent use of catheters. Symptoms of PSH can last from weeks to years following initial onset. As episodes persist over time, they have been found to become less frequent in occurrence but last for prolonged periods.

== Causes ==
The number of events that can lead to the development of PSH symptoms is many. The exact pathways or causes for the development of the syndrome are not known. Traumatic brain injury, hypoxia, stroke, injury of the spinal cord, and many other forms of brain injury can cause onset of PSH. It is observed that these injuries lead to the development of PSH or are seen in conjunction with PSH, but the pathophysiology behind these diseases and the syndrome is not well understood.

== Pathophysiology ==
A considerable number of theories exist as to the pathophysiology:

- Epileptiform discharges in the diencephalon, or the interbrain, are a potential theory for PSH. These discharges can be identified using electroencephalography.
- Increased intracranial pressure is another theory. Currently, this theory seems to be less likely than the others. Intracranial pressure has been seen to have no correlation to PSH episodes.
- Disconnection via lesions of the inhibitory efferent pathways from cortical and subcortical areas of the brain is a potential theory. This theory deals with inhibitory pathways being ablated or malfunctioning post-injury. This leads to sympathetic pathways from the cortical and subcortical areas being less controlled, resulting in a 'sympathetic storm'.
- Excitatory-inhibitory models suggest that lesions in the mesencephalic area lessen inhibition pathways from the brain. This is thought to lead to pathways that are usually non-nociceptive becoming nociceptive, which results in the peripheral sympathetic nervous system being over activated.
- Another theory deals with malfunction of the brainstem, specifically excitatory centers in the brainstem. In this case, rather than inhibitory pathways malfunctioning and allowing sympathetic pathways to propagate unhindered, excitatory centers are up-regulated, increasing sympathetic activity.

== Diagnosis ==
Diagnosing PSH can be very difficult due to the lack of common terminology in circulation and a lack of diagnostic criteria. Different systems for diagnosis have been proposed, but a universal system has not been embraced. One example of a proposed system of diagnosis requires observation confirmation for four of the six following symptoms: fever greater than 38.3 degrees Celsius, tachycardia classified as a heart rate of 120 bpm or higher, hypertension classified as a systolic pressure higher than 160 mmHg or a pulse pressure higher than 80 mmHg, tachypnea classified as respiration rate higher than 30 breaths per minute, excess sweating, and severe dystonia. Ruling out other diseases or syndromes that show similar symptoms is imperative to diagnosis as well. Sepsis, encephalitis, neuroleptic malignant syndrome, malignant hyperthermia, malignant catatonia, spinal cord injury (not associated with PSH), seizures, and hydrocephalus (this can be associated with PSH) are examples of diagnoses that should be considered due to the manifestation of similar symptoms before confirming a diagnosis of PSH. PSH has no simple radiological features that can be observed or detected on a scan.

== Treatment ==
=== Medication ===
The two most common medications used in the treatment of paroxysmal sympathetic hyperactivity are morphine and beta blockers. Morphine is useful in helping halt episodes that have started to occur. Beta blockers are helpful in preventing the occurrence of "sympathetic storms". Other drugs that have been used and have in some cases been helpful are dopamine agonists, other various opioids, benzodiazepines, clonidine, and baclofen. Chlorpromazine and haloperidol, both dopamine antagonists, in some cases have worsened PSH symptoms.

==== Morphine ====
Morphine has been found to be effective in aborting episodes; sometimes it is the only medication that can combat the sympathetic response. Morphine helps lower respiration rates and hypertension. It is given in doses of two milligrams to eight milligrams but can be administered up to twenty milligrams. Nausea and vomiting are common side effects. Withdrawal is sometimes seen in patients.

==== Beta blockers ====
Non-selective beta blockers are the most effective in reducing the frequency and severity of PSH episodes. They help decrease the effect of circulating catecholamines and lower metabolic rates, which are high in patients during PSH episodes. Beta blockers also help in reducing fever, diaphoresis, and in some cases dystonia. Propranolol is a common beta blocker administered due to the fact that it penetrates the blood–brain barrier relatively well. Typically it is administered in doses of twenty milligrams to sixty milligrams every four to six hours in the treatment of PSH.

==== Others ====
Clonidine is an alpha-2 receptor agonist that helps reduces sympathetic activity leaving the hypothalamus and reduces circulating catecholamines. It is helpful in lowering blood pressure and heart rate, but it does not show much of an effect on other symptoms. It may also increase sympathetic inhibition in the brainstem. Bromocriptine is a dopamine agonist that helps lower blood pressure. Its effects are modest, but they are not well understood. Baclofen is a GABA_{B} receptor agonist that helps control muscle spasms, proving to be helpful in treating dystonia. Benzodiazepines bind to GABA_{A} receptors and work as muscle relaxants. Benzodiazepines also combat high blood pressure and respiratory rates; however, they are associated with glaucoma, which is a rather serious side effect. Gabapentin inhibits neurotransmitter release in the dorsal horn of the spinal cord and various areas of the central nervous system. It helps treat mild symptoms and can be tolerated for longer periods of time compared to other drug treatments. Dantrolene helps combat dystonia and fever by affecting muscle contraction and relaxation cycles. It hinders the release of calcium from the sarcoplasmic reticulum, inhibiting muscle contraction. It causes decreases in respiration, but it can be very dangerous for the liver.

== Prognosis ==
Patients who develop PSH after a traumatic brain injury have longer hospitalization and longer durations in intensive care in cases where ICU treatment is necessary. Patients often are more vulnerable to infections and spend longer times on ventilators, which can lead to an increased risk of various lung diseases. PSH does not affect mortality rate, but it increases the amount of time it takes a patient to recover from injury, compared to patients with similar injuries who do not develop PSH episodes. It often takes patients who develop PSH longer to reach similar levels of the brain activity seen in patients who do not develop PSH, although PSH patients do eventually reach these same levels.

== History ==
The first published case of paroxysmal sympathetic hyperactivity was Wilder Penfield's case report of a 41-year-old woman, JH, published in 1929. She had a third ventricle cholesteatoma. She displayed increased respiration, increased heart rate, diaphoresis, and increased blood pressure. She also displayed minor symptoms: pupillary dilation, hiccups, and lacrimation. At the time, her episodes were termed diencephalic autonomic epilepsy. It was believed that both her sympathetic and parasympathetic nervous systems were showing overactivity.
