= Aesthetic medicine =

Broad term for specialties that focus on altering cosmetic appearance

Aesthetic medicine is a branch of modern medicine that focuses on altering natural or acquired unwanted appearance through the treatment of conditions including scars, skin laxity, wrinkles, moles, liver spots, excess fat, cellulite, unwanted hair, skin discoloration, spider veins and or any unwanted externally visible appearance. Traditionally, it includes dermatology, oral and maxillofacial surgery, reconstructive surgery and plastic surgery, surgical procedures (liposuction, facelifts, breast implants, radio frequency ablation), non-surgical procedures (radio frequency skin tightening, non-surgical liposuction, chemical peel, high-intensity focused electromagnetic field, radio frequency fat removal), and a combination of both. Aesthetic medicine procedures are usually elective. There is a long history of aesthetic medicine procedures, dating back to many notable cases in the 19th century, though techniques have developed much since then.

== History ==
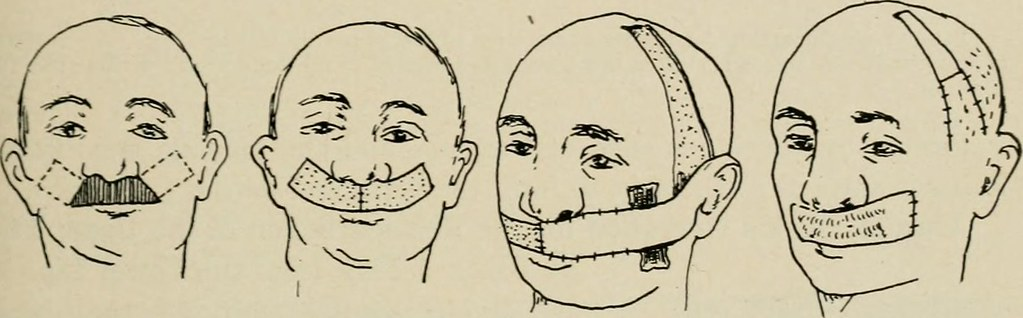
Upper lip deformity repaired using a skin flap from the forehead.

Physical beauty has been a consistently coveted notion. Efforts to improve and enhance beauty through aesthetic medical practices can be seen as early as 2000 years ago, in India, where the 'forehead flap' was used to reconstruct the noses and faces of soldiers injured in war and criminal punishments. This technique, though thoroughly developed and modified, is still used today as a common method to repair nasal defects. Although Greek and Roman medical practices have been considered the foundation for European and modern-day medicine for a long time, ancient Egyptian texts have revealed that Egyptian medicine produced many key medical discoveries and the basis for many modern practices. The Egyptians recorded their use of oils, waxes, Cyperus, and other plant materials to reduce the signs of aging, like wrinkles and spots, and to restore youthful skin. They studied bodily functions, like inflammatory processes, and were able to make discoveries that allowed them to treat cosmetic wounds and burns using therapies and medicines. This included the initial application of fresh meat to the wound, followed by the use of oil/lipids, honey, and fibers, generally woven linen, until the wound had healed. As physicians have discovered more about medicine throughout history, these practices have been developed to be more efficient and sanitary and can be seen today in common skin reparation remedies.

In more recent history, within the past 30 years, the industry of aesthetic medicine has been developing rapidly with the addition of and growing demand for "injectables," a form of transcutaneous treatment used to rejuvenate and restore the skin of a patient. These medical injectables have become well established due to their associated low risk, especially compared to other aesthetic surgical practices, as well as the practically non-existent recovery time needed after the procedures are performed. Within the past ten years, the U.S. Food and Drug Administration has reviewed and approved over 20 injectable products used for medical aesthetics, in response to the growing demand. The most commonly used injectables in the industry today are botulinum neurotoxin, commonly referred to as botox, and hyaluronic acid fillers. According to statistics from an annual survey conducted by the American Society for Aesthetic Plastic Surgery, from 1997 to 2011 the number of nonsurgical procedures performed by aesthetic physicians increased by 356%.

In 2024, the Royal Society of Medicine announced the creation of a Section of Aesthetic Medicine and Surgery to serve as an academic home for the specialty. The section was established in response to rapid scientific progress and the increasing number of medical, surgical and dental professionals practising in aesthetic medicine. The establishment of the Section was seen as a turning point in the professional recognition of aesthetic medicine. It aims to promote evidence-based best practices in the specialty and formally commenced on 1 October 2024, with consultant dermatologist Dr Christopher Rowland Payne appointed as its founding president.

== Statistics ==
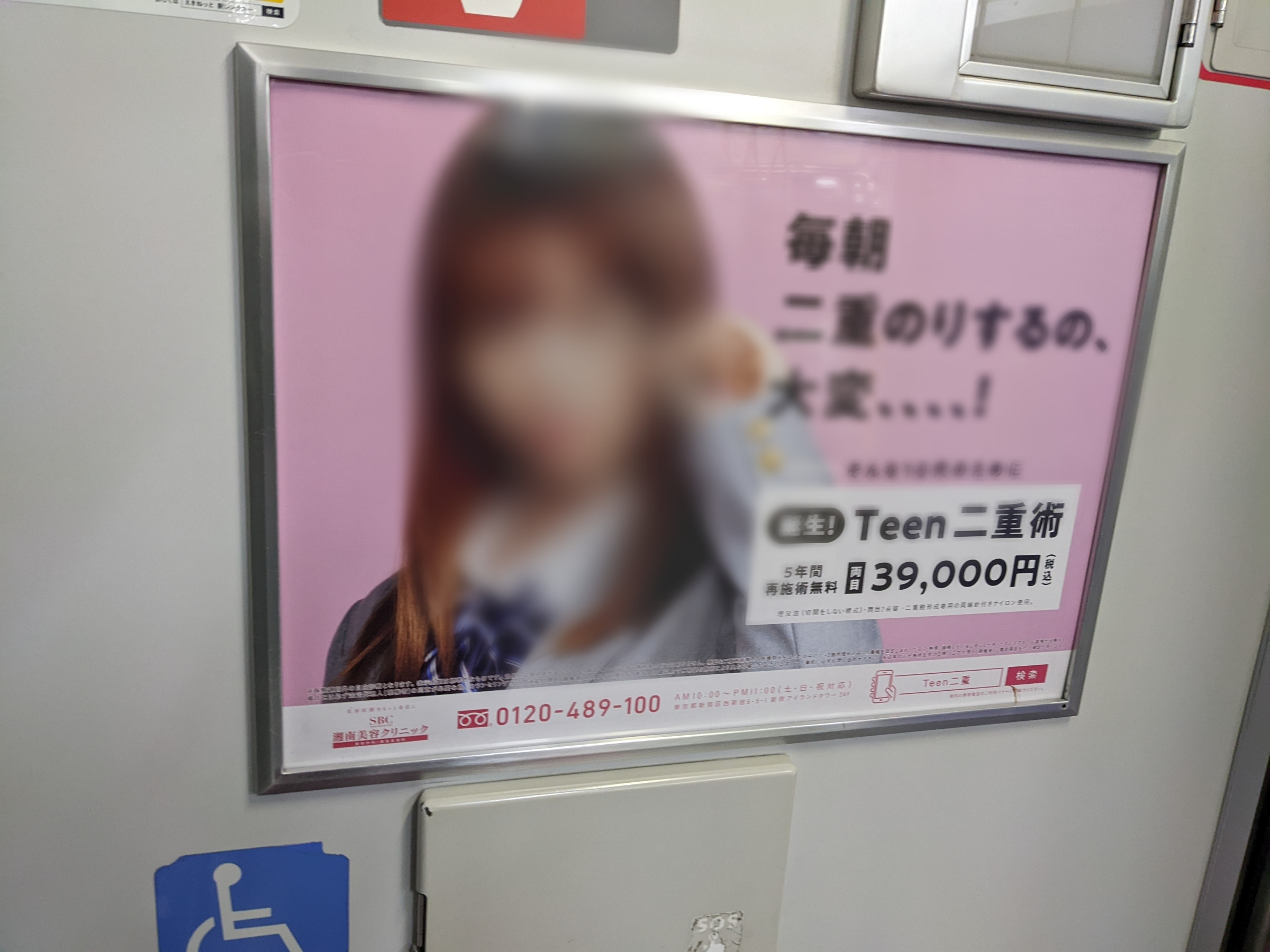
Aesthetic medicine advertisement targeting teenagers, in Japan

- Worldwide, there were 20 million aesthetic procedures performed from 2014 to 2015. Cosmetic surgery is a major driver of medical tourism. In February 2018 the president of the British Association of Aesthetic Plastic Surgeons said operations were performed on people who were not appropriate for surgery, and that unscrupulous practitioners have endangered their health for profit and that the cost of rectification for more than 1000 patients a year fell on the British National Health Service.
- Countries that performed the most aesthetic procedures in 2014 were
  1. United States
  2. Brazil
  3. Japan
  4. South Korea
  5. Mexico

United States

- There were more than 11 million aesthetic procedures performed from 2012 to 2013, and 83.5% of the procedures were nonsurgical.
- The top five surgical aesthetic procedures were 1) Liposuction 2) Breast augmentation 3) Blepharoplasty 4) Abdominoplasty 5) Rhinoplasty
- The top five nonsurgical aesthetic procedures were 1) Botulinum Toxin 2) Hyaluronic acid 3) Laser hair removal 4) Microdermabrasion 5) Photorejuvenation

United Kingdom

- There were 50,000 cosmetic surgery procedures performed in 2013-2014.
- Surgical aesthetic procedures account for 10% of the cosmetic procedures, and non-surgical techniques constitute the remaining 90%.

South Korea

- More than 980,000 aesthetic procedures were performed from 2014–2015.
- The top five surgical aesthetic procedures were 1) Blepharoplasty 2) Rhinoplasty 3) Fat Grafting 4) Rhytidectomy 5) Hair Transplantation

== Indications ==
Aesthetic medicine specializes in altering the cosmetic appearance. It has diverse applications for dermatological and surgical conditions. It includes indications related to minimizing signs of aging, such as skin laxity, wrinkles, and liver spots. Aesthetic medicine also plays a role in the treatment of excess fat, cellulite, and obesity. Laser based therapies can be indicated for the treatment of scars, unwanted hair, skin discoloration, and spider veins.

Overall health is assessed by a physician to ensure that the symptom being treated (for example, weight gain and excessive hair) is not a sign of an underlying medical condition (like hypothyroidism) that should be stabilized with medical therapies. It is also very important for the medical aesthetician to be inclusive in providing a team approach for minimally invasive facial aesthetic procedures.

== Techniques and procedures ==
- Photorejuvenation
- Injections of Botulinum toxin (Botox)
- Injection of dermal fillers
- Cryolipolysis
- Chemical Peels
- Mesotherapy injection
- Cellulite treatment
- Nutrition
- Permanent makeup
- Hair transplantation
- Laser hair removal
- Laser Therapy for scars and stretch marks
- Nd:YAG laser for spider veins
- Contour threads
- Non-surgical liposuction
- Lipotomy
- Carboxytherapy
- Radio Frequency skin tightening
- laser tattoo removal
- facelifts
- Rhinoplasty
- Abdominoplasty
- Breast augmentation or reduction
- Brachioplasty
- Liposuction

== Careers in aesthetic medicine ==
A career in aesthetic medicine can be approached from a number of professions. A multidisciplinary or team based approach is often necessary to adequately address an aesthetic need. To perform certain procedures, one must be a surgeon, medical doctor (Dermatologist/plastic surgeon/ENT surgeon/Oculoplastic surgeon) or maxillofacial surgeon /Cosmetic Dentist. Medical Aesthetics requires specialized training and certification beyond a nurse license / aesthetic license. Counselors, psychologists or psychiatrists can help people determine if their reasons for pursuing aesthetic procedures are healthy and help to identify psychiatric disorders such as compulsive eating, anorexia, and body dysmorphic disorder. Reconstructive surgeons can help correct appearance after accidents, burns, surgery for cancer (such as breast reconstruction after mastectomy for cancer), or for congenital deformities like correction of cleft lip. Orthodontists work to improve alignment of teeth, often partially for aesthetic reasons, and oral and maxillofacial surgeons can perform cosmetic facial surgery & correct deformities of the mouth and jaw. Both orthodontists and maxillofacial surgeons can be assisted by dental technicians.

== See also ==
- International Association for Physicians in Aesthetic Medicine
