= Zeltiq Aesthetics =

Medical device company

Zeltiq
- Type: Subsidiary
- Industry: Cryolipolysis
- Founded: 2005
- Founder: Mitchell Levinson
- Headquarters: Pleasanton, California, United States
- Key people: Mark J. Foley, president and chief executive officer
- Products: CoolSculpting Procedure
- Parent: Allergan plc
- Website: zeltiq.com

Zeltiq Aesthetics is a subsidiary of AbbVie based in Pleasanton, California, that markets and licenses devices used for cryolipolysis procedures. The company was founded in 2005, raised $75 million in funding before going public in 2011, and was acquired by Allergan for $2.48 billion in February 2017. Allergan was then acquired by AbbVie in 2020 for $63 billion.

== History ==
Zeltiq was founded in 2005 as Juniper Medical, Inc., by Mitch Levinson, who had previously led Thermage, a company that sold devices for radio frequency skin tightening. The company changed its name to Zeltiq in July 2007.

The company developed a medical device to remove fat using a process called cryolipolysis, which it branded as "CoolSculpting". The device works by pulling a piece of flesh between two paddles, which cool it to below freezing and hold the temperature there for a half hour or so. Afterwards the flesh is frozen and numb; the numbness persists for two to three months. For the clinics that use it, there is a high capital investment, and a room is tied up for a relatively long time. It is intended for body contouring and not general weight loss. As of 2013, clinical trials have found that Cryolipolysis is moderately effective and has mostly mild and temporary side effects.

Cryolipolysis was invented by Rox Anderson and colleagues, and Juniper Medical exclusively licensed patent filings on the invention from Massachusetts General Hospital when Juniper was founded. An early prototype was created to test the method on pigs, and preliminary results from a clinical trial were reported in 2009.

In 2009, Gordie Nye was appointed CEO, replacing Levinson, who remained on the board.

Zeltiq brought the device to market first for use in numbing the skin prior to dermatology procedures being done; Zeltiq received FDA clearance to market it for this purpose under the de novo pathway in 2010. While the company did not market its device for removing fat at that time, doctors on its scientific board were talking about that use at scientific meetings and on TV news, and doctors started using it off-label for "body-sculpting".

The company made money from selling the machines, and also charged doctors for each procedure they did with the machine. Because the procedure was elective surgery, people paid out of pocket for it. By the end of 2010, the company had raised $75 million in financing over four rounds of funding.

The device received FDA clearance to be marketed for removing love handle fat from people's sides in September 2010 and from the stomach in 2012. It has also been approved by Health Canada and the European Union. By late 2010 CoolSculpting had been introduced as a body-sculpting procedure in Europe, Asia and Canada. By 2011, Zeltiq was approved to market the procedure in 46 countries.

CoolSculpting became popular in the United States around 2011. In the first half of that year, Zeltiq's revenues grew four-fold to $31.6 million, though it was still operating at a small loss. Zeltiq filed for an initial public offering later that year. The IPO raised $91 million.

By January 2012, there had been 150,000 CoolSculpting treatments. In 2014, Zeltiq introduced a new model of the CoolSculpting device obviating the suction cup and was cleared by the FDA for use on thighs.

As of 2014 the company's device led the market for cryolipolysis.

In February 2017 Zeltiq was purchased by Allergan for $2.48 billion.

As of June 2020, CoolSculpting has been cleared to treat the abdomen, love handles (flanks) upper arm, back fat, bra fat, banana roll, submental area, and thighs.

== CoolSculpting side effects ==
Linda Evangelista claims CoolSculpting procedure she underwent resulted in an uncommon side effect paradoxical adipose hyperplasia, experienced by under 1% of the patients, and causing fatty tissue to thicken and expand, the outcome contrary to the expected from the procedure. Other studies, however, indicate that side effects are common on a per-patient basis, since a typical patient receives multiple treatments.

Side effects under 1% (1 on 100) are called: "uncommon" by EMA, while they need to be under 1 on 1,000, to be called: "rare" and under 1 on 10,000, to be called: "very rare". If the side effect equals 1%, EMA scale calls it a "common" side effect.
