= Massachusetts General Hospital =

Hospital in Boston, Massachusetts, U.S.

- Mass General Brigham

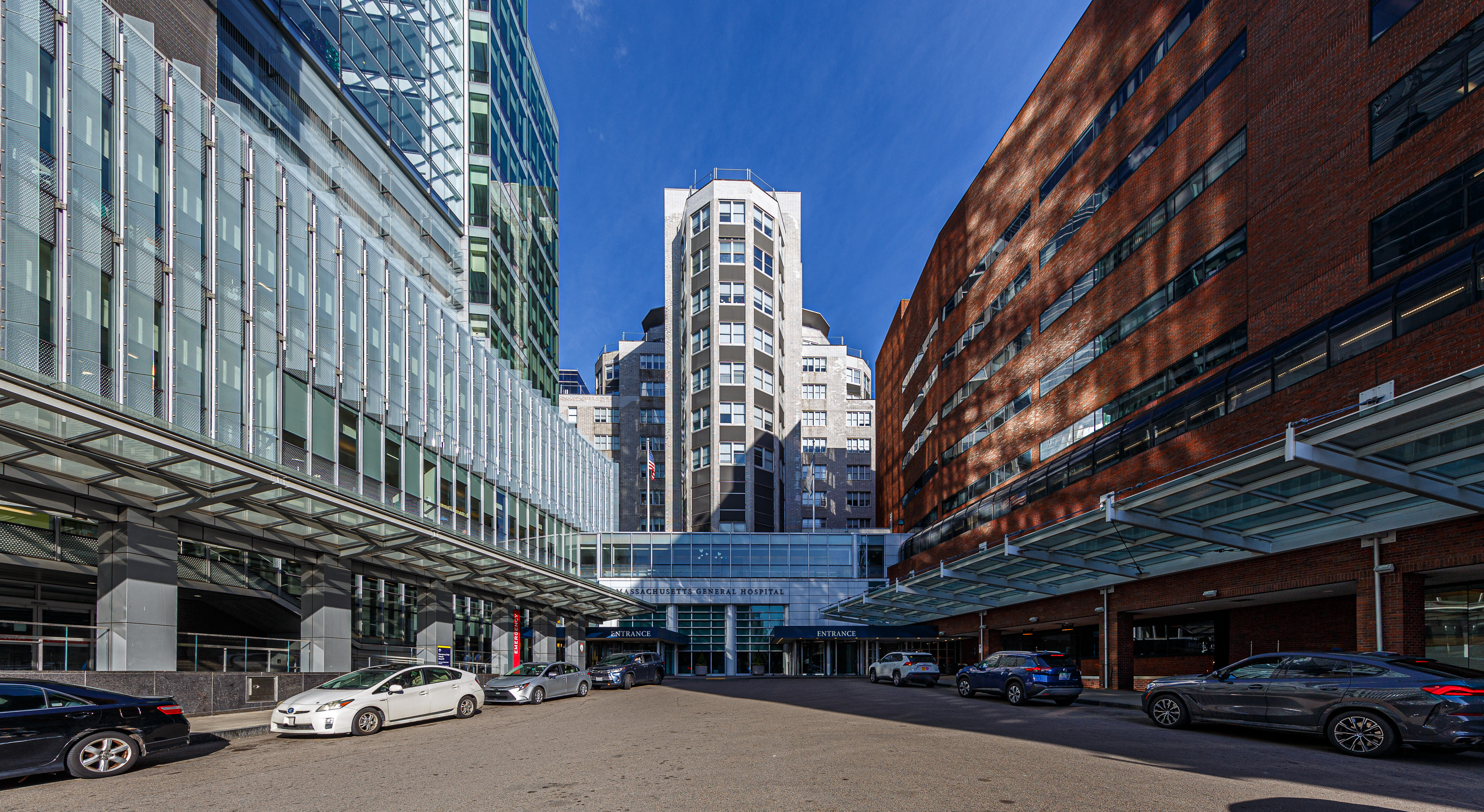
- Lunder Building (L); Main Entrance (C); Wang Building (R), 2024

Geography
- Location: 55 Fruit Street, Boston, Massachusetts, United States
- Coordinates: 42°21′46″N 71°04′08″W

Organization
- Type: Teaching and Research
- Affiliated university: Harvard Medical School/Harvard University

Services
- Emergency department: Level I Adult Trauma Center / Level I Pediatric Trauma Center
- Beds: 999

Helipads
- Helipad: (FAA LID: 0MA1)
Number	Length		Surface
Number	ft	m	Surface
H1	60	18	Asphalt

History
- Founded: 1811 MGB shuttle service

Links
- Website: massgeneral.org
- Lists: Hospitals in Massachusetts

Massachusetts General Hospital (Mass General or MGH) is a teaching hospital located in the West End neighborhood of Boston, Massachusetts. It is the original and largest clinical education and research facility of Harvard Medical School/Harvard University, and houses the world's largest hospital-based research program with an annual research budget of more than $1.2 billion in 2021. It is the third-oldest general hospital in the United States with a patient capacity of 999 beds. Along with Brigham and Women's Hospital, Mass General is a founding member of Mass General Brigham, formerly known as Partners HealthCare, the largest healthcare provider in Massachusetts.

== History ==
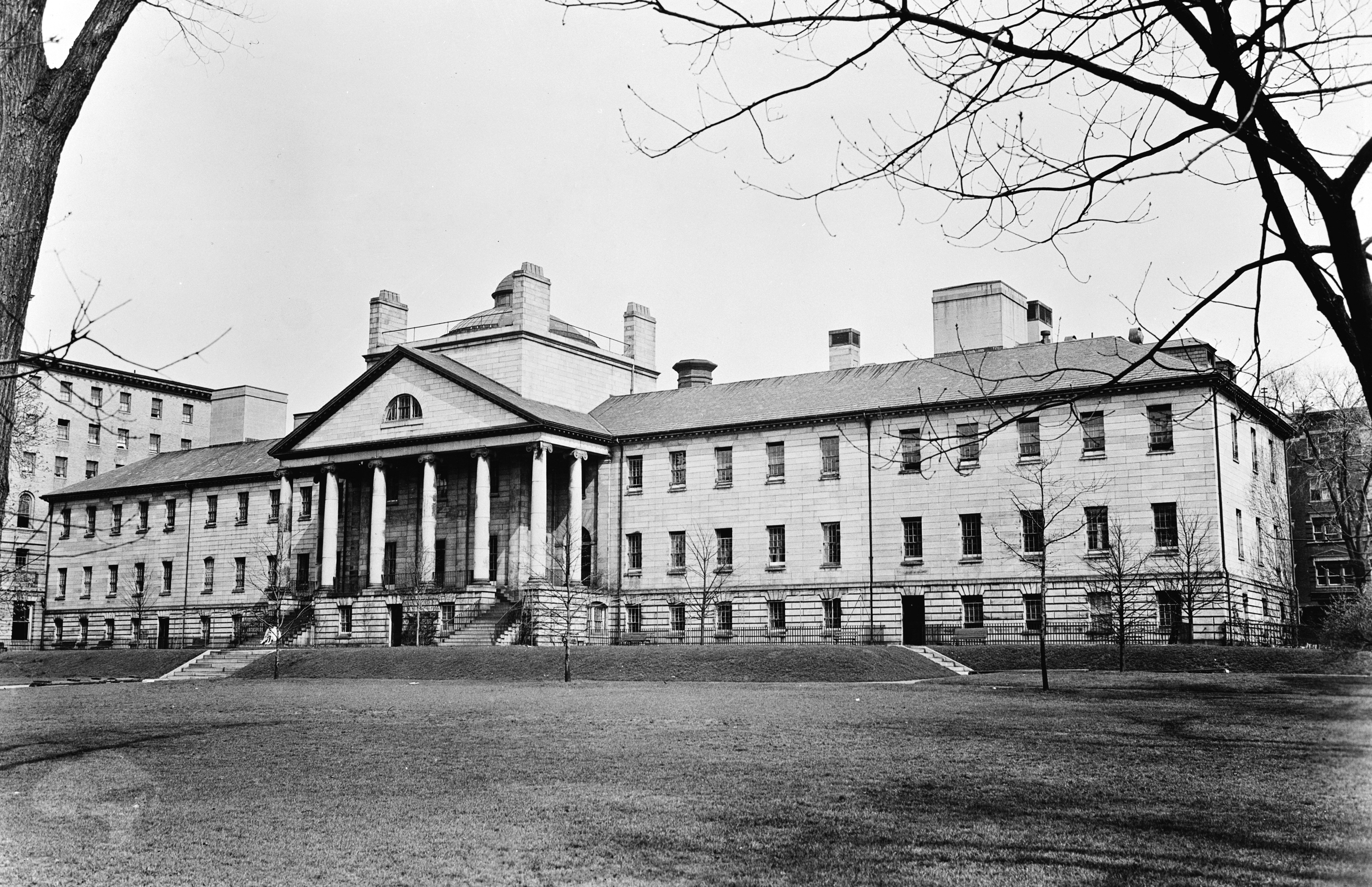
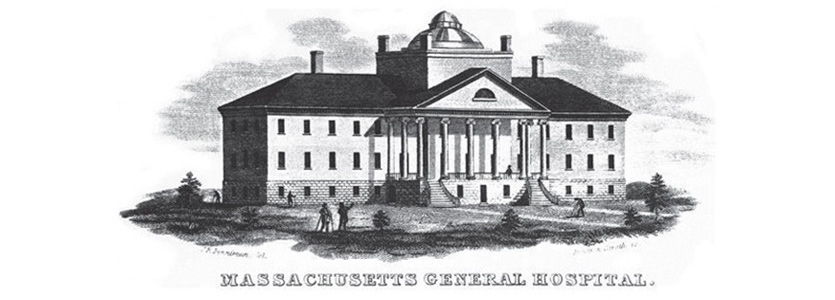
From the upper:
The Bulfinch Building as it appeared in 1941, including the Ether Dome.
The Bulfinch Building: State of the Art from the Start.

Founded in 1811, the original hospital was designed by the famous American architect Charles Bulfinch. It is the third-oldest general hospital in the United States; only Pennsylvania Hospital (1751) and NewYork-Presbyterian Hospital's predecessor New York Hospital (1771) are older. John Warren, Professor of Anatomy and Surgery at Harvard Medical School, spearheaded the move of the medical school to Boston. Warren's son, John Collins Warren, a graduate of the University of Edinburgh Medical School, along with James Jackson, led the efforts to start the Massachusetts General Hospital, which was initially proposed in 1810 by Rev. John Bartlett, the Chaplain of the Almshouse in Boston. Because all those who had sufficient money were cared for at home, Massachusetts General Hospital, like most hospitals that were founded in the 19th century, was intended to care for the poor. A 30-year-old sailor was the first patient admitted to the hospital on September 3, 1821. During the mid-to-late 19th century, Harvard Medical School was located adjacent to Massachusetts General Hospital.

Walter J. Dodd established the radiology department at the hospital. From just after the discovery of x-rays in 1895, until his early death in 1916 from metastatic cancer caused by multiple radiation cancers he oversaw the radiology department. He also underwent over 50 surgical procedures at the hospital to treat his radiation injuries, from skin grafts to amputations.

The first American hospital social workers were based in the hospital.

The hospital's work with developing specialized computer software systems for medical use in the 1960s led to the development of the MUMPS programming language, which stands for "Massachusetts General Hospital Utility Multi-Programming System", an important programming language and database system heavily used in medical applications such as patient records and billing. A major patient database system called File Manager, which was developed by the Veterans Administration (now the Department of Veterans' Affairs), was created using this language.

=== Early use of anesthesia ===
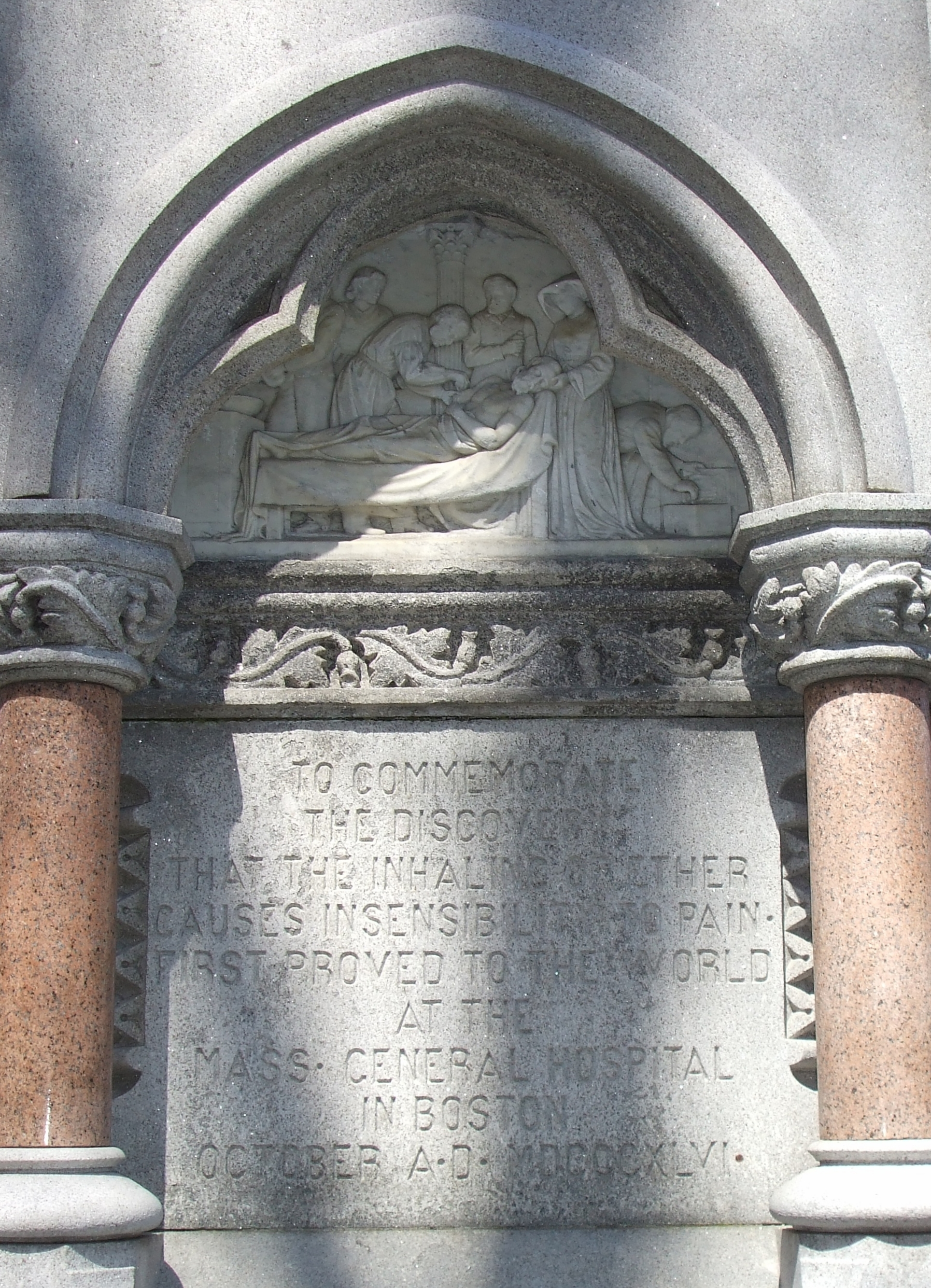
Monument in Boston commemorating Morton's demonstration of ether's anesthetic use

It was in the Ether Dome of MGH in October 1846, that a local dentist, William Thomas Green Morton, was invited to perform a public demonstration of the administration of inhaled ether to produce insensibility to pain during surgery. Several years prior, Dr. Crawford Long of Danielsville, Georgia had given ether for surgery, but his work was unknown outside Georgia until he published his experience in 1849. On 16 October 1846, after administration of ether by Morton, MGH Chief of Surgery, John Collins Warren, painlessly removed a tumor from the neck of a local printer, Edward Gilbert Abbott. Upon completion of the procedure, which was without screaming or restraint, the usually skeptical Warren reportedly quipped, "Gentlemen, this is no humbug." News of this "anesthesia" invention rapidly traveled within months around the world.

A reenactment of the Ether Dome event was painted in 2000 by artists Warren and Lucia Prosperi. They used the then-MGH staff to pose as their counterparts from 1846. The Ether Dome still exists and is open to the public.

An anesthesia department was established at the MGH in 1936 under the leadership of Henry Knowles Beecher.

=== First successful replantation of a severed limb ===
On 23 May 1962, under the direction of Ronald A. Malt, a team of surgeons successfully accomplished the first replantation of completely severed limb.

While attempting to hitch a ride on the back of a freight train, Everett Knowles (1950–2016), aged 12 at the time, hit an abutment when the train lurched, severing his arm completely at the shoulder. He and his arm were rushed to MGH, where a 30 year old Malt conducted the team of surgeons. Some doctors prepared Everett for surgery, while others worked on the separated arm. First, they rejoined the "chaotically mangled blood vessels, then the bone and finally the skin". In the time since the accident, the arm had grown a "deathly gray", but grew steadily pink as the surgery progressed and blood vessels were reattached. The nerves would be reconnected in a later surgery.

"All we did," said the modest Dr. Malt, "was apply techniques we've known about for a long time and simply never had occasion to correlate before...The astonishing thing was not the newness of the operation but the teamwork—the way 12 doctors with expert skills, distinguished a collection of authorities as you could find anywhere, were willing to stand by and feed the incomparable extent of their knowledge to me, for no gain other than to know they had contributed."

In April 2019, MGH received a $200 million gift from Cambridge entrepreneur Phillip "Terry" Ragon to endow a permanent vaccine research center. This gift is the largest in the hospital's history and is addition to the $100 million gift he previously gave the hospital. The center is currently testing an HIV vaccine in South Africa.

== Facilities and current operations ==
The main MGH campus is located at 55 Fruit Street in Boston, Massachusetts. It has expanded into an area formerly known as the West End, adjacent to the Charles River and Beacon Hill. The hospital handles around 1.5 million outpatient visits each year at its main campus, as well as its seven satellite facilities in Boston at Back Bay, Charlestown, Chelsea, Everett, Revere, Waltham and Danvers. With more than 25,000 employees, the hospital is the largest non-governmental employer in Boston.

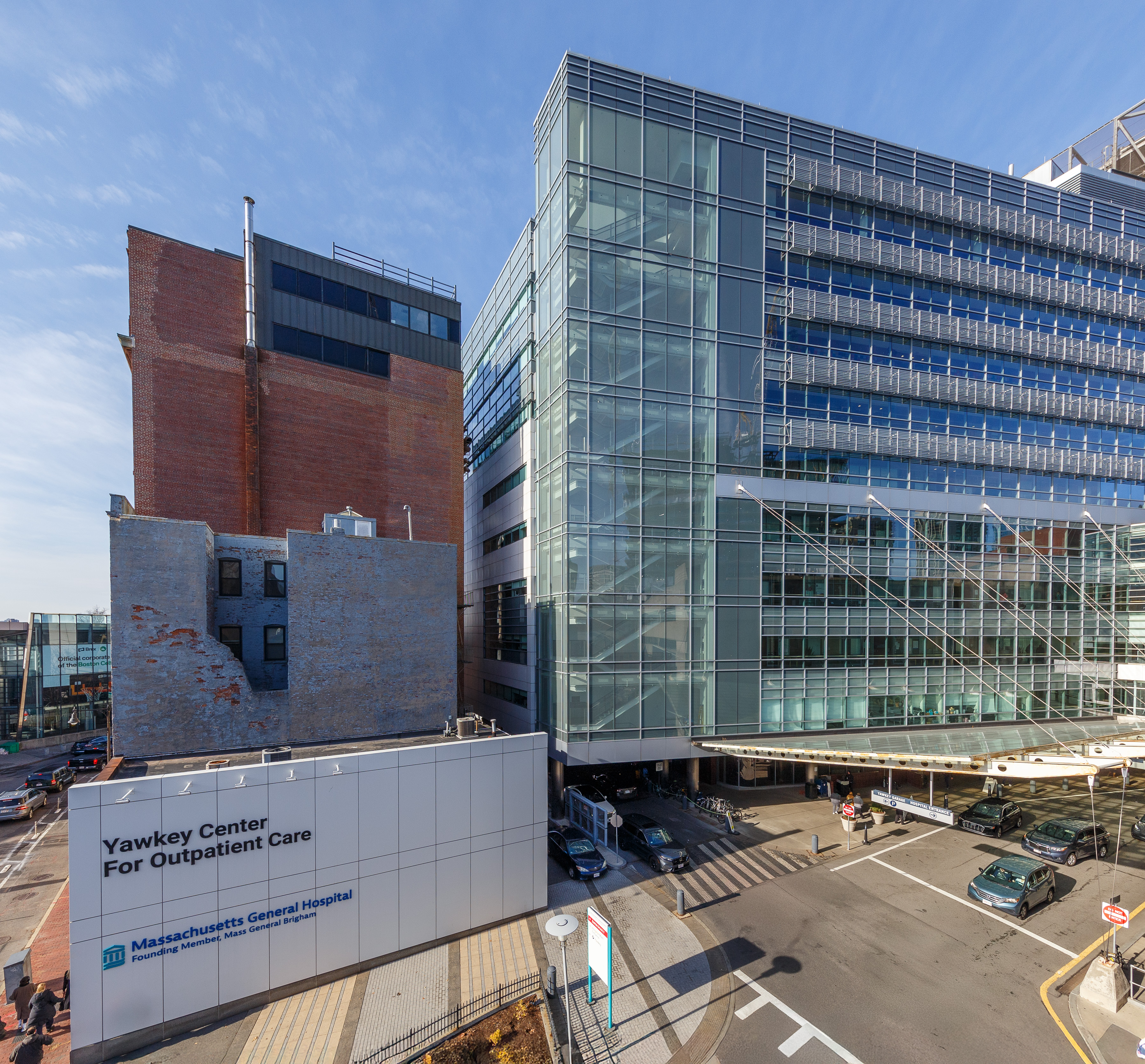
Yawkey Center outpatient building

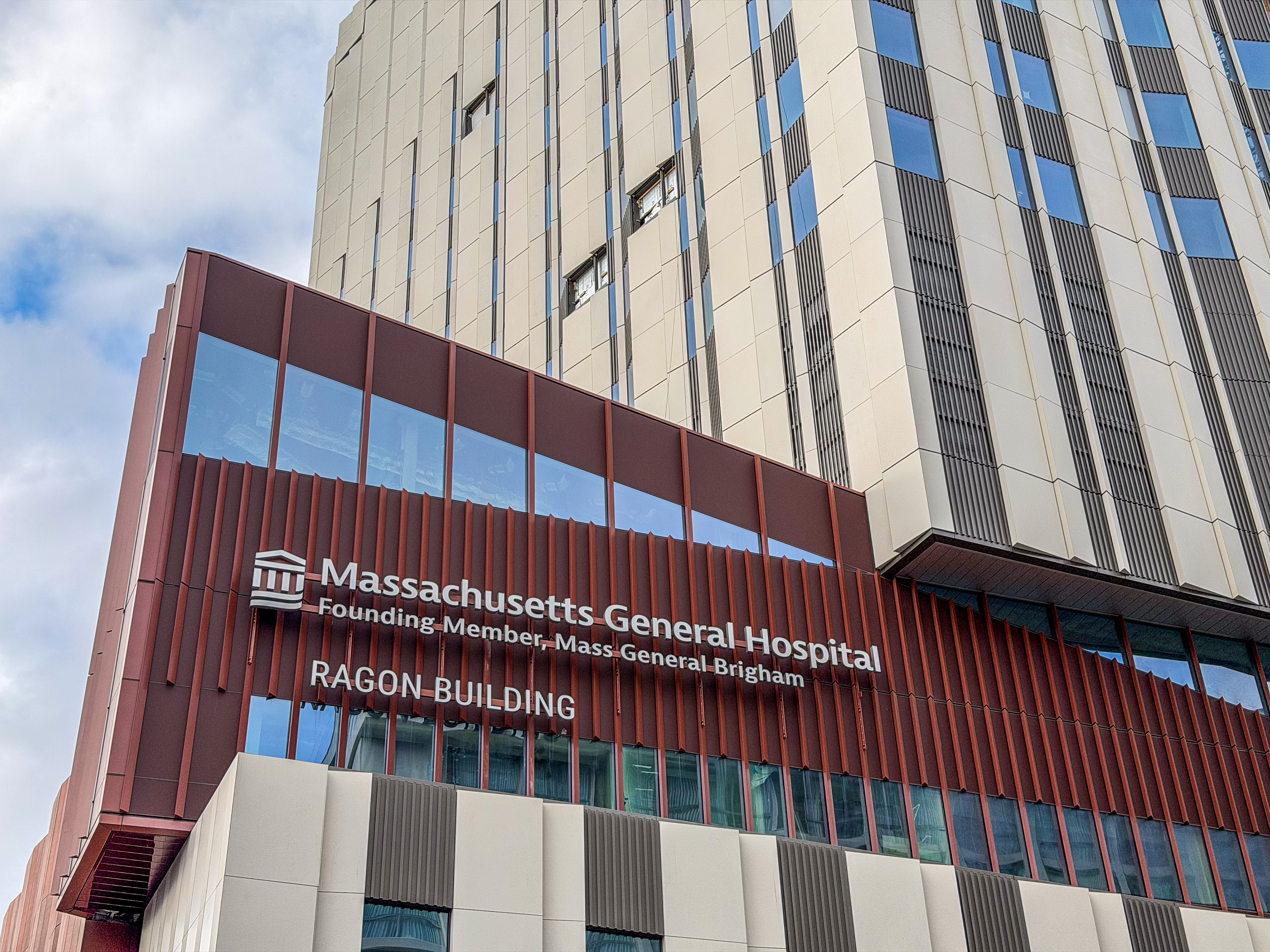
Ragon Building under construction (early 2026)

The hospital has 1,011 beds and admits around 50,000 patients each year. The surgical staff performs over 34,000 operations yearly. The obstetrics service handles over 3,800 births each year. The Massachusetts General Hospital Trauma Center is the oldest and largest American College of Surgeons-verified Level One Trauma Center in New England, evaluating and treating over 2,600 trauma patients per year. Architect Hisham N. Ashkouri, working in conjunction with Hoskins Scott Taylor and Partners, provided the space designs and schematics for the pediatrics, neonatal intensive care, and in-patient related floors, as well as the third-floor surgical suites and support facilities. In the fall of 2004, the Yawkey Center for Outpatient Care (named for Jean R. Yawkey) opened. This 380,000-square-foot (35,000 m^{2}) ten-floor facility is the largest and most comprehensive outpatient building in New England. In 2011, the Lunder Building, a 530,000-square-foot (49,000 m^{2}), 14-floor building opened. The building houses three floors of operating rooms, an expanded emergency room, radiation oncology suites, inpatient neurology and neurosurgery floors, and inpatient oncology floors; all of which increase the inpatient capacity by 150 beds.

In 2022, the state approved a more than $2 billion expansion proposal from MGB, which included a $1.9 billion expansion of MGH with a new clinical building on Cambridge Street. This building will house 482 inpatient beds. After utilizing many of these beds to convert other parts of the hospital from 2-bed to 1-bed rooms, the hospital will net 94 new inpatient beds. The project is expected to be fully completed in 2030.

=== Transportation ===
The closest MBTA stop to the main campus is Charles/MGH on the Red Line. On March 27, 2007, the new Charles/MGH station was opened with new renovations, including handicap accessible elevators. There are five main food service areas for the general public on the MGH campus. They include the Eat Street Cafe in the lower level of the Ellison Building, the Blossom Street Cafe in the Cox lobby, Coffee Central in the White lobby, Tea Leaves and Coffee Beans in the Wang Ambulatory Care Center, and Coffee South in the Yawkey outpatient center.

== Massachusetts General Hospital for Children ==
Massachusetts General Hospital for Children
- Mass General Brigham

Organisation
- Type: Children's hospital
- Affiliated university: Harvard Medical School

Services
- Emergency department: Level I Pediatric Trauma Center

History
- Former name: Children's Health Service

Links
- Website: https://www.massgeneral.org/children/

Massachusetts General Hospital for Children (MGHfC) is a pediatric acute care children's teaching hospital located in Boston, Massachusetts. The hospital has an estimated 100 pediatric beds and is affiliated with Harvard Medical School. The hospital is a member of Mass General Brigham and is the only children's hospital in the network. The hospital provides comprehensive pediatric specialties and subspecialties to patients aged 0–21 throughout Boston and the wider Massachusetts. Massachusetts General Hospital for Children also sometimes treats adults that require pediatric care. The hospital is directly attached to Massachusetts General Hospital and a Ronald McDonald House of New England family room is on site.

The hospital has an American Academy of Pediatrics verified level III neonatal intensive care unit that has a capacity of 18 bassinets. The hospital also has a 14-bed pediatric intensive care unit for critical pediatric patients age 0–21.

In 2020, amidst the COVID-19 pandemic, the hospital converted their PICU into an adult ICU to help with the surge capacity for COVID-19. Patients that were in the PICU previously were transferred out to the Floating Hospital for Children and Boston Children's Hospital for treatment.

=== Awards ===
As of 2021, Massachusetts General Hospital for Children has placed nationally in 5 ranked pediatric specialties on U.S. News & World Report.

U.S. News & World Report Rankings for Massachusetts General Hospital for Children
Specialty	Rank (In the U.S.)	Score (Out of 100)
Neonatology	#42	79.1
Pediatric Diabetes & Endocrinology	#28	70.7
Pediatric Gastroenterology & GI Surgery	#25	79.6
Pediatric Pulmonology & Lung Surgery	#23	77.6
Pediatric Urology	#47	51.1

== The Mass General Research Institute (MGRI) ==
Massachusetts General Hospital houses the largest hospital-based research program in the United States, the Mass General Research Institute, with an annual research budget of over $1 billion in 2019. MGRI received the 10th-most funding from the National Institutes of Health in 2018, with ~$500 million going to support 959 awards. The Mass General Research Institute was launched in 2015 as a formalized way to support promote and guide research at Massachusetts General Hospital. Research at MGRI takes place in over 30 departments, centers, and institutes across the hospital. The Institute, in conjunction with clinical staff based in the hospital, is home to fundamental research labs investigating the basic building blocks of life as well as a clinical research program with approximately 1,200 active clinical trials. The hospital has six thematic research centers:

- The Center for Systems Biology
- The Center for Regenerative Medicine
- The Center for Genomic Medicine
- The Wellman Center for Photomedicine
- The Center for Computational and Integrative Biology
- The Ragon Institute of MGH, MIT and Harvard

Notable scientists at MGH include Jack Szostak, PhD, 2009 winner of the Nobel Prize in Physiology or Medicine, Rakesh Jain, PhD, a 2015 recipient of the National Medal of Science, and Gary Ruvkun, PhD, winner of the 2014 Wolf Prize in Medicine, the 2014 Gruber Prize in Genetics, and the 2014 Breakthrough Prize in Life Sciences. In 2019, 55 scientists from MGH were listed in Clarivate Analytics' Web of Science annual Highly Cited Researchers Report. There are 23 MGH researchers in the National Academy of Medicine (some are listed under their Harvard Medical School affiliation), and four MGH researchers in the National Academy of Sciences.

Notable medications that have resulted from research at Mass General include:

Treatment	Company	Description	Investigator
Enbrel	Amgen	Treatment for autoimmune diseases	Brian Seed, PhD
Duralt Longevity E1, Vivacit-E	Zimmer Biomet	Polyethylene that reduces orthopedic implant wear	William H. Harris, MD, DSc and Orhun Muratoglu, PhD
Coolsculpting	Allergan	Selective freezing of fat for aesthetic fat removal	Rox Anderson, MD
INOmax	Mallinckrodt	Hyponic respiratory failure treatment in neonates	Warren Zapol, MD
StarLux	CynoSure	Laser hair removal	Rox Anderson, MD
Victoza	Johnson & Johnson	Treatment for type 2 diabetes	Joel Habner, MD
Cobas EGFR Mutation Test	Labcorp	Photodynamic therapy of wet age-related macular degeneration	Tayyaba Hasan, PhD (Wellman Center for Photomedicine)
Visudyne	Novartis	Photodynamic therapy of wet age-related macular degeneration	Tayyaba Hasan, PhD
Entyvio	Takeda	Treatment of ulcerative colitis and Crohn's disease	Robert B. Colvin, MD and Andrew Lazarvotis, MD

== Mass General Cancer Center ==
The Mass General Cancer Center is a center for cancer treatment within the broader Mass-General Hospital system, located at 55 Fruit Street in Boston, Massachusetts. It was formally established in 1989 as an independent aspect of the Mass-General Hospital system, and remains active today. The center was one of only 53 locations to receive the designation as a National Cancer Institute Comprehensive Cancer Center.

As part of the Mass General Hospital System, the Cancer Center extends throughout New England and has several different community locations to receive treatment. It continues to expand, and in September 2023 recently received donations from philanthropists Jason and Keely Krantz to establish the Krantz Family Center for Cancer Research. This expansion is the largest individual donation in the Center's 34-year history, although the donation amount has not been disclosed.

=== Second opinions ===
The hospital offers a global second opinion service in cooperation with Grand Rounds.

== Affiliated institutions ==
Massachusetts General Hospital is affiliated with Harvard Medical School and is its original and largest teaching hospital. Together they form an academic health science center. In February 2009, the Phillip T. and Susan M. Ragon Institute of immunology was founded to bolster research into creating vaccines and other therapies for acquired immune system conditions, chiefly AIDS. It was made possible by a $100 million gift over ten years, and represents the largest single donation made to MGH.

The Recovery Research Institute was created in 2013 by John F. Kelly, the first endowed professor of Addiction Medicine at Harvard Medical School. The institute is a part of the Massachusetts General Hospital Department of Psychiatry and published the National Recovery Study, the first-ever nationally representative study on the number of Americans in recovery from alcohol or other drug use. The institute also created the Addictionary, the first-ever glossary of addiction-related terms and a system for stigmatized terminology alerts.

MGH is affiliated with the Dana–Farber Cancer Institute through Dana-Farber/Partners Cancer Care and the Dana–Farber/Harvard Cancer Center. They are also affiliated with Project Pinball Charity. In 2015, MGH Home Base Program became a founding partner of the Warrior Care Network health system focused on treating post-traumatic stress disorder (PTSD) in veterans, along with partners Emory Healthcare, Rush University Medical Center, UCLA Health and Wounded Warrior Project.

Though it has its own chief of psychiatry and top-ranking department, MGH is closely affiliated with nearby McLean Hospital, a psychiatric hospital also affiliated with Harvard Medical School.

=== Educational units ===
- Massachusetts General Hospital Academy
- Massachusetts General Hospital Psychiatry Academy
- MGH Institute of Health Professions

(in partnership with Harvard University)

== Awards and recognition ==
=== Nobel laureates ===
There have been thirteen Nobel Laureates who have either worked or trained at MGH.

- 1934 George R. Minot, MD
- 1947 Carl F. Cori, PhD
- 1953 Fritz A. Lipmann, MD, PhD
- 1972 Gerald M. Edelman, MD, PhD
- 1985 Michael S. Brown, MD, and Joseph L. Goldstein, MD
- 1989 J. Michael Bishop, MD
- 1990 Joseph Edward Murray, MD and Donnall Thomas, MD
- 1998 Ferid Murad, MD, PhD
- 2009 Jack W. Szostak, PhD
- 2011 Ralph Steinman, MD
- 2012 Robert Lefkowitz, MD
- 2024 Gary Ruvkun, PhD

=== Rankings ===
In 2015, MGH was named the number one hospital in the United States by U.S. News & World Report and is nationally ranked in 16 specialties.

In 2012, MGH was named the number one hospital in the United States by U.S. News & World Report.

In 2011, MGH was named the second-best hospital in the United States by U.S. News & World Report. MGH consistently ranks as one of the country's top hospitals in U.S. News & World Report. In 2011, MGH was also ranked as one of the top three hospitals in the country for Diabetes & Endocrinology; Ear, Nose & Throat; Neurology & Neurosurgery; Ophthalmology; Orthopedics; and Psychiatry.

In August 2011, Becker's Hospital Review listed MGH as number 12 on the 100 'Top Grossing Hospitals' in America with $5.64 billion in gross revenue.

In 2003, MGH was named the state's first Magnet hospital by the American Nurses Credentialing Center, a subsidiary of the American Nurses Association. Magnet recognition represents the highest honor awarded for nursing excellence.

== Controversies ==
In 1972 MGH received criticism from activists and legislators for their role in conducting a study of the use of amygdalotomy to reduce violence in individuals who received the procedure. This study came after significant pressure on medical practitioners to stop using invasive procedures to try to alter behavior of patients and was denounced as "a new form of lobotomy". Although the study was ended before any surgery was conducted on incarcerated people, MGH was simultaneously criticized for conducting genetic and fingerprint studies of people incarcerated at MCI–Cedar Junction (known as MCI–Walpole at the time), Bridgewater State Hospital, and MCI–Framingham in an attempt to discover markers for "criminal" behavior. This discredited science is often associated with attempts at the time to pathologize and incarcerate black people as a response to the Black Liberation Movement.

In May 2015, a former MGH physician filed a lawsuit under seal alleging that at least five orthopedic surgeons endangered patient safety by keeping them under anesthesia longer than necessary while the surgeons performed simultaneous surgeries. That year, MGH fired Dr. Dennis Burke after he spoke to The Boston Globe about the dual-booking practice. In 2019, MGH paid $13 million and agreed to improve safety practices, to settle Burke's wrongful termination suit. Also in 2019, MGH paid $5.1 million to settle a medical malpractice lawsuit involving a concurrent surgery performed on former Boston Red Sox baseball team pitcher Bobby Jenks.

Dr. Lisa Wollman refiled her lawsuit in June 2017 under the federal False Claims Act, citing concerns that the hospital was driven by economic benefit and keeping patients unaware of the practice of concurrent surgeries. Wollman's attorney claimed that Medicare and Medicaid were being defrauded because they require that the surgeons must be present for all "critical portions" of the surgery in order to be compensated. MGH settled the lawsuit in 2022 for $14.9 million, including reimbursement for the disputed government payments, and agreed to get specific consent for the practice from patients.

In June 2019, approximately 10,000 patients participating in research studies at MGH, had their names, dates of birth, diagnoses, tests, medical record numbers, and medical histories exposed in a data breach by "an unauthorized third party". The incident did not become public until August 2019.

== See also ==
- Harvard Medical School
- Proto (magazine)
- Schwartz Center for Compassionate Healthcare
- Sumner Jackson
