= Striae atrophicans =

- Specialty: Dermatology

Striae atrophicans are a cutaneous condition characterized by usually multiple, symmetric, well-defined linear atrophic lesions that often follow the lines of cleavage.

== See also ==
- Striae distensae
- List of cutaneous conditions
