= R. Rox Anderson =

American dermatologist and photomedicine researcher

Richard Rox Anderson
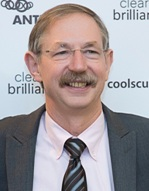
- Born: October 30, 1950 (age 75)
- Education: Massachusetts Institute of Technology; Harvard Medical School

Richard Rox Anderson, FAAD (born 30 October 1950), is a Boston-based dermatologist and entrepreneur.

== Education and career ==
Anderson earned his BS degree from MIT, and then pursued his MD degree graduating magna cum laude from the joint MIT-Harvard medical program, Health Sciences and Technology. Anderson completed his residency in dermatology and research fellowship at Harvard University.

Upon completing his dermatology residency and research fellowship he became a part of the Harvard staff, where he eventually became a professor in dermatology and the director of the Wellman Center for Photomedicine at Massachusetts General Hospital. He also serves as an adjunct Professor of Health Sciences and Technology at MIT.

Anderson's contributions include laser hair removal, photodynamic therapy (use of light-activated localized drugs for cancer and macular degeneration), laser treatment of port-wine stains in children, and basic research into the free electron laser for the selective destruction of lipids (i.e., fats) for possible treatment of acne, cellulite, and atherosclerosis, as well as various uses of photothermolysis using pulsed dye lasers.

Anderson and colleagues invented a crude device to noninvasively remove fat by freezing it, in a process called cryolipolysis; and a startup company called Juniper Medical exclusively licensed patent filings on the invention from Massachusetts General Hospital when Juniper was founded; Juniper became Zeltiq Aesthetics.

In the mid-2000s Anderson invented a tattoo ink designed to simplify tattoo removal called "InfinitInk". The ink is encapsulated in tiny plastic beads; the encapsulated ink is stable in normal light, but under the same kind of laser light used in laser tattoo removal, the ink is released from the beads and is absorbed. Anderson co-founded a company called Freedom-2 to bring the ink to market. with assistance from Edith Mathiowitz, Joshua Reineke and A. Peter Morello of Brown University.

In 2015, he co-founded Olivo Laboratories with Daniel G. Anderson and Robert Langer.
