= Tayyaba Hasan =

Tayyaba Hasan Ph.D.
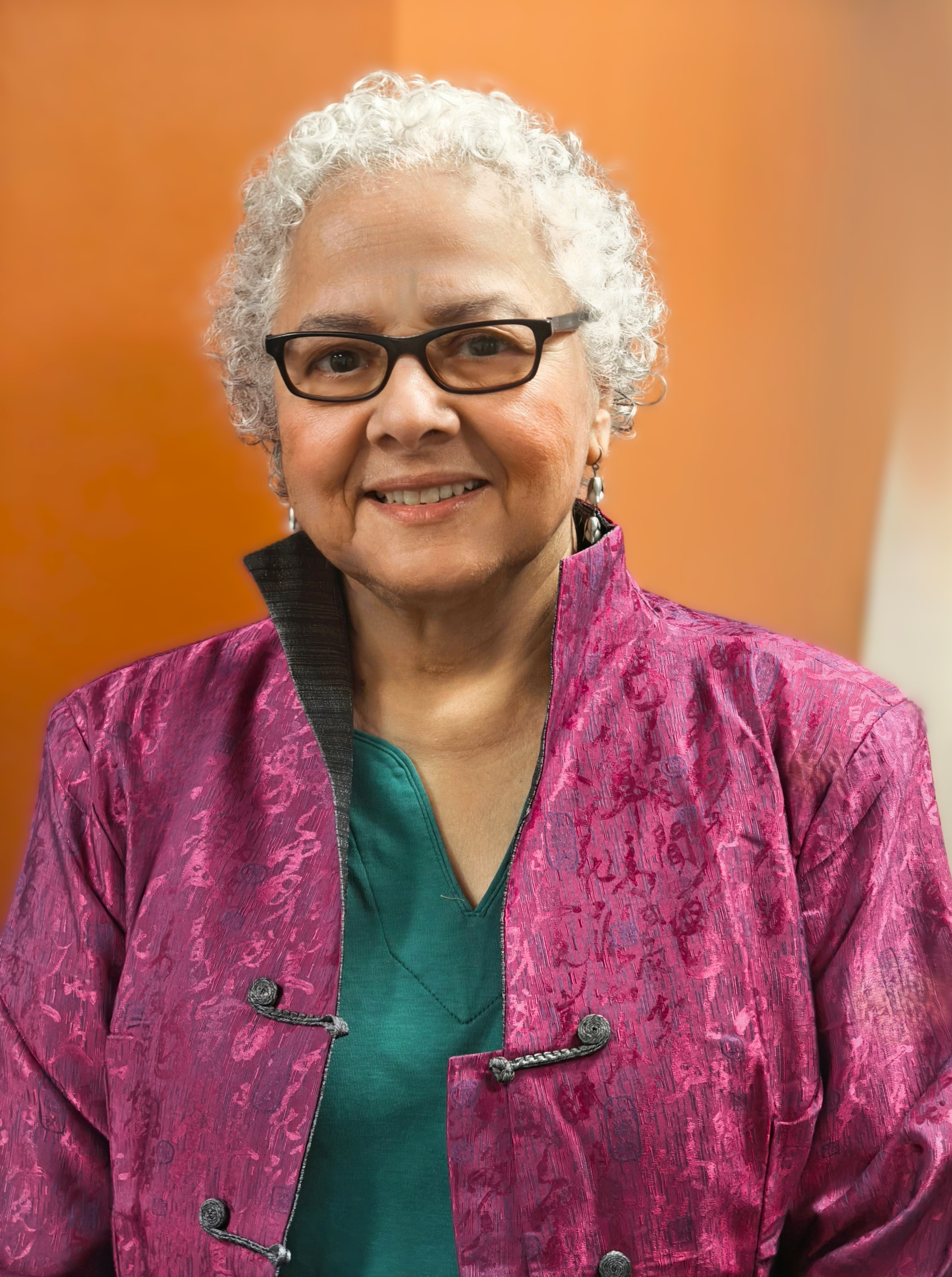
- Education: University of Karachi; University of Islamabad; University of Arkansas
- Known for: Visudyne
- Scientific career
- Fields: Dermatology; Photodynamic therapy
- Workplaces: University of Pennsylvania; Harvard Medical School; Massachusetts General Hospital
- Website: hasanlab.mgh.harvard.edu/about-us/tayyaba-hasan

Tayyaba Hasan is a professor of dermatology at the Wellman Center for Photomedicine at Harvard Medical School and Massachusetts General Hospital (part of Mass General Brigham aka MGB). She is also a Professor of Health Sciences and Technology at Harvard-MIT (HST).

Hasan is one of the inventors of Visudyne (aka Verteporfin), a Food and Drug Administration approved treatment for age-related macular degeneration of the eye, that has been used to treat millions of patients worldwide. Recognized as a leader in the field of photodynamic therapy (PDT) worldwide, Hasan has been an active researcher for more than 40 years, earning more than a dozen significant awards and recognitions for her research and mentoring, most recently the US Presidential Award for Excellence in Science, Mathematics and Engineering Mentoring (PAESMEM). Hasan has over 300 publications (cited more than 36k times), 30+ inventions, and is a Fellow of both the National Academy of Inventors and the OSA (formerly the Optical Society of America).

== Early life and education ==
Hasan completed her bachelor's degree in chemistry at the University of Karachi in 1966. She earned her master's degree in 1968, specializing in organic chemistry. In 1970 Hasan gained a second master's degree in organic chemistry from the University of Islamabad (now known as Quaid-i-Azam University). She won several National Merit Scholarships from the Punjab Education Foundation and Punjab University. She moved to the University of Arkansas for her postgraduate research, earning her PhD in physical organic chemistry in 1980. She was elected to Sigma Xi. She also holds an honorary master's degree from Harvard University awarded in 2000.

== Research ==
After completing her PhD, Hasan joined the University of Pennsylvania as a postdoctoral research fellow in the chemistry department. She joined Harvard Medical School in 1982. Hasan worked with Alan Oseroff on antibody conjugate photosensitization of cells for receptor-based photolysis. She showed it was possible to target sub-cellular structures by photosensitization. Hasan's scientific efforts are focused on photochemistry-based approaches (photodynamic therapy, or PDT) for the treatment and diagnosis of cancer and infection using targeted strategies, especially nanotechnology. She has trained dermatologists, ophthalmologists, urologists, gynecologists and orthopedic surgeons.

She demonstrated that benzoporphyrin derivatives could be used in the eye to eliminate subretinal vessels. She went on to discover Visudyne with Ursula Schmidt. Visudyne is one of over thirty US patents held by Hasan. She was inducted as a Fellow into the National Academy of Inventors in 2018 as a result of her many innovative inventions. She was appointed to professor of dermatology at HMS and MGH in 2009. In 2011 she inaugurated what is now a part of ECOR as the founding director of the Office for Research Career Development at Massachusetts General Hospital.

She is targeting diseases such as leishmaniasis, mycobacterium tuberculosis, methicillin-resistant Staphylococcus aureus and cancers of the pancreas and skin . Hasan's lab focusses on the photophysical and biological mechanisms of photodynamic therapy. The overall strategy is to develop molecular mechanisms and optical imaging-based combination treatment regimens where one treatment arm involves light activation of certain near-infrared-absorbing chemicals. This is designed to identify various cellular and molecular targets for specific diseases and design constructs for optimal photochemical treatment effects. She leads a National Cancer Institute funded multi-national project focused on image-guided therapy for pancreatic and skin cancers. These include singlet oxygen formation, and cytokine secretion. She also leads an international consortium developing low-cost technologies for image-guided photodynamic therapy of oral cancer in low resource settings, in addition to several investigator-initiated programs.

The Hasan Lab runs several collaborative research projects:

- Small Molecule Enhancers of Photodynamic Therapy for Skin Cancer
- Endoscopic Photodynamic and Combination Therapy for Local and Metastatic Pancreatic Tumors
- Mechanism-Based Design of Combination Therapies for Pancreatic Cancer
- Model-Based Dosimetry and Imaging for PDT

Since 2001 she has led a National Cancer Institute funded Program Project advancing the mechanistic principles and clinical testing of photodynamic therapy, photoimmunotherapy and photodynamic priming for cancer treatment.

Her leadership has included many senior roles, such as terms as the President of the American Society for Photobiology (ASP), Co-Chair and President of the International Photodynamic Association (IPA), Member of the Advisory Board for the Planning Committee of the European Society for Photobiology (ESP) and many Study Sections and grant review panels both for the US NIH as well as international funding panels. She contributed to the 2014 book Photodynamic Therapy: From Theory to Application. She also serves on the advisory board of Polythea.

== Awards ==
- 2023 Presidential Award for Excellence in Science, Mathematics and Engineering Mentoring (PAESMEM), recognizing both her mentoring and her scientific achievements, by The White House Office of Science and Technology Policy (OSTP) jointly with the National Science Foundation (NSF).
- 2022 Gold Medal, recognizing significant mentoring and career contributions which greatly advanced the field of photodynamic therapy (PDT). (Lifetime Achievement Award), by the International Photodynamic Association.
- 2021 Thomas Dougherty Award for Excellence in PDT (Lifetime Achievement Award): at the International Conference on Porphyrins and Phthalocyanines, ICPP-11.
- Gold Medal Award for Excellence in Photobiological Research for internationally acknowledged and outstanding scientists who have given crucial contributions to the European Society for Photobiology (ESP) (Lifetime Achievement Award).
- 2019 “Tayyaba Hasan ImPAct Award”, a recognition for excellence in the field, named in her honor, awarded biennially at each IPA World Congress, at the 17th IPA World Congress, Cambridge, MA
- 2019 Lifetime Achievement Award, which Recognizes the illustrious career of a Senior researcher whose work has significantly advanced the research areas of the ASP, by the American Society for Photobiology at the Biennial Congress in Tampa FL
- 2018 Inducted as a Fellow Member for her significant contributions to the field of science and technology as a distinction for her innovative work. This award highlights academic inventors who have demonstrated a prolific spirit of innovation in creating or facilitating outstanding inventions that have made a tangible impact on quality of life, economic development, and the welfare of society by the National Academy of Inventors, in Houston, TX
- 2018 Inducted as a Fellow Member for pioneering advances in the broader field of photobiology, in particular for innovations in the application of photophysical and photochemical tools for bench to bedside translation in photodynamic therapy and imaging, incorporation of photodynamic therapy for global health applications and spearheading and establishing the field of targeted photodynamic therapy and serving with distinction in the advancement of optics and photonics, The Optical Society (now known as OSA).
- 2018 American Society for Photobiology Lifetime Achievement Award which recognizes the illustrious career of a senior researcher whose work has significantly advanced the research areas of the American Society for Photobiology
- 2018 Britton Chance Biomedical Optics Award in recognition of trailblazing contributions to the field of Photodynamic Therapy and its clinical translation, leadership and service to the photonics community (Lifetime Achievement Award), SPIE at Photonics West in San Francisco CA
- 2018 Outstanding Achievement Award for seminal contributions in the field of cancer research. (Lifetime Achievement Award), Society of Asian American Scientists in Cancer Research Award for Contributions to Cancer Research (SAASCR), AACR meeting in Chicago, IL
- 2017 Award for significant advancement of Photodynamic Therapy, for research excellence in the field of Photodynamic therapy, International Photodynamic Association at the 16th IPA World Congress in Coimbra Portugal
- 2015 Lifetime Achievement Award in PDT Research, for Research Excellence in the field of Photodynamic Therapy, International Photodynamic Association at the 15th IPA World Conference in Rio de Janeiro Brazil
- 2014 Special Directors' Award for Service to HST community, Harvard-MIT Division of Health Sciences & Technology (HST), Harvard Medical School
- 2012 10th Anniversary Mentor Award, in recognition of exceptional mentoring of postdoctoral scholars and unwavering commitment to training well-prepared scientists for the future, National Postdoctoral Association
- 2010 Science Club for Girls Catalyst Award Honoree for Dedication to equity in Science, Engineering and Technology
- 2009 Harvard Medical School William Silen Lifetime Achievement in Mentoring Award
- 2009 National Institutes of Health Pioneers in Biomedical Optics for Bench-to-Bedside Translation
- 2007 Partners in Excellence Award, Partners Healthcare (now known as Mass General Brigham)
- 2001 Partners in Excellence Award, Partners Healthcare (now known as Mass General Brigham)
- 1968-70 National Merit Fellowships, University of Islamabad, Pakistan (now known as Quaid-i-Azam University)
- 1964-68 National Merit Scholarships, Punjab Board of Education and Punjab University, Pakistan
