= Linda Evangelista =

Canadian model (born 1965)

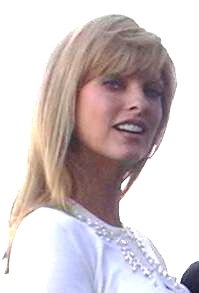
- Evangelista in 2004
- Born: May 10, 1965 (age 61); St. Catharines, Ontario, Canada
- Occupation: Model
- Years active: 1983–1998; 2001–present
- Spouse: Gérald Marie (m. 1987; div. 1993)
- Partners: Kyle MacLachlan (1992–1998); Fabien Barthez (1998–2002) François-Henri Pinault (2005–2006)
- Children: 1
- Relatives: Christine Evangelista (cousin); Luke Evangelista (second cousin)
- Modelling information
- Height: 5 ft 10 in (1.78 m)
- Hair colour: Brown
- Eye colour: Blue-green
- Agency: DNA Model Management (New York); Models 1 (London); View Management (Barcelona); Priscilla's Model Management (Sydney)

Linda Evangelista (/ˌiːvændʒəˈliːstə/ EE-van-jə-LEE-stə; Italian: [evandʒeˈlista]; born May 10, 1965) is a Canadian fashion model. She is regarded as one of the most accomplished and influential models of all time, and has been featured on over 700 magazine covers. Evangelista is primarily known for being the longtime muse of photographer Steven Meisel, as well as for the phrase: "We don't wake up for less than $10,000 a day."

Evangelista's modelling career began in 1984, when she signed with Elite Model Management after moving from Canada to New York City. Upon the suggestion of photographer Peter Lindbergh, Evangelista had her hair cut short in 1988.

Described as the "chameleon" of the fashion industry and one of the "Big 6" supermodels (with Christy Turlington, Naomi Campbell, Claudia Schiffer, Kate Moss and Cindy Crawford), Evangelista was one of the most famous women in the world during the late 1980s and throughout the 1990s. Unlike her colleagues, Evangelista chose not to diversify into other ventures outside of modelling. She retired from her career in 1998 and made a comeback three years later, this time working only sporadically. Her achievements as a model led to her being voted as "The Greatest Supermodel of All Time" by the viewers of the television show Fashion File in 2008.

== Early life ==
Evangelista was born into a strict working-class Catholic family on May 10, 1965, in St. Catharines, Niagara Region, Ontario. Her parents, Tomaso "Tom" Evangelista (died 2014) and Marisa, had emigrated from Pignataro Interamna, Lazio, Italy. Tom worked for General Motors following his emigration in 1957, and Marisa is a bookkeeper. The second of three children, Evangelista has two brothers.

At the age of 12, Evangelista attended a self-improvement course in a modelling school, where she was taught things such as poise and etiquette and advised to attend a modelling course. Evangelista attended Denis Morris Catholic High School. She started modelling locally as a teenager. In 1981, Evangelista took part in the Miss Teen Niagara beauty pageant; while she did not win it, she caught the eye of a representative from Elite Model Management. At the age of 16, Evangelista flew to Japan to work as a model, but an unpleasant experience involving nudity during an assignment made her want to stop modelling altogether. She subsequently returned to Canada, and two years went by before she decided to try her hand at modelling again.

== Career ==
=== 1984–1987: Early career ===
Evangelista moved to New York City in 1984 upon signing with Elite, where she met the modelling agent John Casablancas, who compared her likeness to the model Joan Severance. Elite then moved Evangelista to Paris, where she launched her international high-fashion career at the age of 19. Her first major fashion magazine cover was for the November 1984 issue of L'Officiel. Subsequently, she appeared on the covers and in the pages of a variety of international publications, including Vogue, Harper's Bazaar, Cosmopolitan, Glamour, Mademoiselle, Elle, W, Marie Claire, Allure, Time, Interview, Newsweek, Rolling Stone, Cigar Aficionado, and i-D. She appeared on a total of more than 700 covers worldwide.

In 1985, Evangelista began working with Karl Lagerfeld, the head designer of the fashion house Chanel, to whom she would become a muse. On the subject of Evangelista, Lagerfeld once uttered, "There is not another model in the world as professional as she is." Evangelista became one of the first editorial models to successfully cross over into the realm of runway modelling, with her agent Piero Piazzi successfully booking her to walk for fashion designer Gianni Versace, for whom she became a muse. She first appeared in a Versace ad campaign in 1987. She also modelled for various other fashion brands such as Valentino, Dolce & Gabbana, Gianfranco Ferré, Ralph Lauren, Yves Saint Laurent, Azzedine Alaïa, Oscar de la Renta, Giorgio Armani, Thierry Mugler, Claude Montana, Donna Karan, Jil Sander, Jean Paul Gaultier, Alberta Ferretti, Isaac Mizrahi, Escada, Calvin Klein, Salvatore Ferragamo, Max Mara, Perry Ellis, Chloé, Comme des Garçons, Bill Blass, and Herve Leger. She has represented a diverse array of other companies and non-fashion brands like Visa, American Express, Pizza Hut, De Beers, and Elizabeth Arden.

In 1986, Evangelista met the photographer Steven Meisel, with whom she forged a friendship. From that point on, they began working together on many professional collaborations, and Evangelista became Meisel's muse in the process. Starting in 1987, Evangelista began to appear in advertisements and commercials for Revlon's "The Most Unforgettable Women in the World" campaign, which was photographed by Richard Avedon. She has also been photographed by Peter Lindbergh, Irving Penn, Francesco Scavullo, Herb Ritts, Bruce Weber, Gian Paolo Barbieri, Patrick Demarchelier, Paolo Roversi, Norman Parkinson, Arthur Elgort, Gilles Bensimon, Ellen von Unwerth, Sante D'Orazio, and Nick Knight among others.

=== 1988–1992: Career breakthrough and supermodel era ===
It was Lindbergh who, in the autumn of 1988, suggested to Evangelista that she cut her hair short after seeing her try on a short wig for a photoshoot. Consequently, she got a short gamine haircut from the French hairstylist Julien d'Ys. The following day, she was photographed by Lindbergh, which resulted in a now-famous photograph known as "the white shirt picture". Initially, the haircut was not well received by the fashion industry, and Evangelista was cancelled from 16 fashion shows. By the spring of 1989, her haircut was the look of the season. The haircut was referred to as "The Linda", and it inspired the creation of a wig called "The Evangelista". Even famous women sought to emulate the look. Among them were Demi Moore, who sported the haircut in the 1990 film Ghost, and Susan Sullivan from the television show Falcon Crest. It has been said of Evangelista that "the world's most famous haircut turned her from an averagely in-demand top model to an insanely in-demand, only-Linda-will-do top model, so sensationally successful that the word 'supermodel' had to be coined to describe her".

Evangelista became known as one of the five supermodels, a group of star models who reached the pinnacle of success during the late 1980s and early 1990s. The supermodels were considered more famous than most actresses and singers of that time. In addition, Evangelista, along with Christy Turlington and Naomi Campbell comprised a triumvirate that was dubbed "The Trinity". They were joined by Cindy Crawford and Tatjana Patitz for the cover of the January 1990 issue of British Vogue, which was photographed by Lindbergh. The cover itself was said to have "defined the supermodel era". Upon seeing the cover, singer George Michael chose to cast them in the music video for his song "Freedom! '90". In May of that year, Evangelista was chosen as one of the "50 Most Beautiful People in the World" by People. She also appeared on the Oprah Winfrey Show where she served as a judge for an Elite model search competition, and chose Leslie Bibb as the winner, who later became an actress.

"We have this expression, Christy and I. We don't wake up for less than $10,000 a day."

— - Evangelista, famously, in Vogue's October 1990 issue

In an interview printed in the October 1990 issue of Vogue, Evangelista said: "We don't wake up for less than $10,000 a day" (equivalent to $25,000 in 2025). That statement is now thought of as the most famous quote in modelling history, and it has been described as "the 'Let them eat cake' of the 20th century". Also in October 1990, Evangelista stunned the fashion world by having the hairstylist Oribe dye her naturally brown hair platinum blonde. Months later, she had her hair dyed a shocking shade of red known as "technicolor red". Throughout most of her modelling career, Evangelista was referred to as the fashion industry's "chameleon" for the way that she constantly reinvented herself with various hairstyles and ever-changing hair colours that inspired hair trends. In terms of her looks, she was likened to Sophia Loren, Elizabeth Taylor, Ava Gardner, and Gina Lollobrigida.

In 1991, it was rumoured that the fashion house Lanvin paid Evangelista $20,000 to walk in their haute couture show for the spring/summer season, an amount that was considered excessive. Model Tyson Beckford recounted in an interview that Evangelista was instrumental in getting higher rates for models. That April, Evangelista waived her runway fee as an act of support for fashion designer Anna Sui's debut collection, and instead accepted clothing as payment. Two months later, she attended Valentino's 30th Anniversary Gala in Rome, Italy with Meisel. In September 1991, Time featured a cover story on the supermodels. The following month, in an article for Vogue, fashion journalist Suzy Menkes described Evangelista as "the world's star model". Evangelista then starred in the 1991 documentary Models: The Film, directed by Lindbergh. And, an episode of the MTV show House of Style devoted a segment to Evangelista, which was filmed in Paris.

During the latter part of 1991 and throughout 1992, Evangelista was seen on several different billboards for the fashion brand Kenar, in the center of Times Square. The billboards were done in conjunction with Ads Against AIDS, which was a campaign created by the advertising industry to raise awareness about tackling the disease. The most talked about and most controversial of those billboards was one that showed Evangelista seated among seven older Sicilian women. It was said that the image, which got dubbed "Beauty and the Seven Beasts" by Richard Johnson in the New York Post, promoted a negative depiction of Italian women. Nonetheless, limited edition prints of the image were sold for $1,000 a piece, to benefit Ads Against AIDS. Also, the image was chosen as one of the "20 most important fashion photographs ever" by the International Center of Photography. Kenneth Zimmerman, president of Kenar, said of Evangelista, "She has increased our sales dramatically." He further added, "Linda was our Michael Jordan. We chose her because we wanted a star, and of the four or five star models, she is number one."

In April 1992, Evangelista and several other supermodels appeared on the cover of the 100th anniversary issue of Vogue, which remains to this day as the magazine's highest-selling issue. She then appeared in the music video for George Michael's "Too Funky" song, in which she parodied her modelling persona. In July 1992, she was on the cover of Canadian fashion magazine Flare, which was an issue honouring Canada's 125 years as a nation. She was also said to have started the trend for thin eyebrows, which later coincided with the arrival of the Neo-Hippie fashion trend in the fall of 1992. Her cover for the September 1992 issue of Harper's Bazaar is now seen as "iconic", and it was ranked #9 on the American Society of Magazine Editors' list of the "Top 40 Magazine Covers of the Last 40 Years" in 2005. Toward the end of 1992, her name was immortalized in RuPaul's song, "Supermodel (You Better Work)".

=== 1993–1998: Continued success and later career ===
Evangelista made headlines in 1993 when she travelled to Australia with Claudia Schiffer for a 5-day tour, which included a news conference and a televised fashion show, as part of the grand opening of a department store. In October 1994, Evangelista was one of several models on the cover of Vogue Italia's 30th anniversary issue. She then appeared in the feature film Prêt-à-Porter. In 1995, the hairstylist Garren of New York changed Evangelista's look by giving her an asymmetrical bob similar to mod hairstyles of the 1960s. That same year, she took part in Thierry Mugler's 20th anniversary fashion show. Evangelista later landed an endorsement deal with Clairol worth over $5 million. She also starred in the fashion documentary Unzipped. Additionally, she was a presenter at the Miss World 1995 competition.

In 1996, Evangelista was one of the ten subjects of Lindbergh's book 10 Women, on whose cover she appeared. She was also seen in the fashion documentary Catwalk. She was also the cover model for the inaugural issues of Vogue Taiwan and Vogue Korea. And, she landed a $7.75 million contract with Yardley of London. Eventually, she made the choice to retire from modelling in 1998, and settled on the French Riviera, where she spent the next two years.

=== 2001–present: Return to modelling ===
In 2001, Evangelista made a noteworthy return to the modelling world, and appeared on the cover of the September issue of Vogue. Also in 2001, she helped to revive the "What Becomes a Legend Most?" ad campaign for Blackglama furs, which hadn't been seen in six years. Rocco Laspata, the photographer of the campaign, described Evangelista as "the Maria Callas of modeling". Then, in 2002, she was in the ad campaign for Versace's fall/winter collection. The next year, she was back on the high-fashion runways, walking for Versace and Dolce & Gabbana. Furthermore, she closed Chanel's fall/winter 2003 haute couture show wearing a white wedding gown. In 2004, she appeared in the spring/summer ad campaigns for both NARS Cosmetics and Fendi. She also walked the runway for Jean Paul Gaultier's debut collection at Hermès. That summer, she was featured in Ann Taylor's 50th anniversary ad campaign, photographed by Annie Leibovitz.

In 2006, Evangelista appeared on the cover of the book In Vogue: The Illustrated History of the World's Most Famous Fashion Magazine along with model Kristen McMenamy, photographed by Meisel. In August of that year, Evangelista made the cover of Vogue, becoming the first model to appear on that magazine's cover in more than a year. Her final runway appearance was in 2007, when she participated in the 60th anniversary fashion show for the Christian Dior brand. That year, she signed a multiple-year exclusive contract as the brand ambassador for the cosmetics giant L'Oreal Paris.

In May 2008, she made an appearance at the Cannes film festival where she posed for photographers on the red carpet along with fellow beauty Aishwarya Rai. Evangelista was then photographed by Meisel for the Prada fall/winter 2008 campaign. She also appeared in the September 2008 issue of Vanity Fair for a feature story on the supermodels titled "A League of Their Own". In 2009, the Metropolitan Museum of Art held an exhibition called The Model as Muse: Embodying Fashion which paid tribute to several fashion models including Evangelista, and she was on the cover of the exhibition's accompanying book. In 2010, she was chosen to star in the ad campaign for the revamped Talbots brand.

Evangelista was photographed by Lagerfeld for Chanel's spring 2012 eyewear ad campaign. In May 2012, Evangelista was on the cover of Vogue Italia after a three-year hiatus from the magazine. She was then featured in the book Vogue: The Editor's Eye as one fashion's model-muses. That November, she was on the cover of the 35th anniversary issue of Fashion magazine. A few months later, the Spanish fashion brand Loewe chose her to represent its newest fragrance Aura.

In June 2013, she attended the Council of Fashion Designers of America awards show, where she presented fashion journalist Tim Blanks with the Media Award. She was photographed by Lagerfeld for the July 2013 cover of Vogue Germany, where she was styled to look like vintage actress Anna Magnani, and posed with Lagerfeld's pet cat Choupette. Also that month, she was on the cover of Vogue Italia for an issue that celebrated the 25th anniversary of Franca Sozzani's tenure as the magazine's editor-in-chief.

In 2014, Evangelista was present at the White House Correspondents' Dinner. She appeared in the fall/winter 2014 ad campaign for the fashion brand Moschino, photographed by Meisel. She was also one of several models on the cover of Vogue Japan's September 2014 issue, which marked the magazine's 15th anniversary. And, she was on the cover of the September 2014 issue of Harper's Bazaar, which has been described as "Harper's biggest ever". Moreover, she was one of 50 models on the September 2014 cover of Vogue Italia, the magazine's 50th anniversary issue. Evangelista has remained the recordholder for the most Vogue Italia covers. She was also chosen to represent Dolce & Gabbana's new line of makeup. In October 2014, it was announced that Evangelista had signed on to be a guest judge on the ninth season of the reality television series Australia's Next Top Model.

Evangelista was chosen by Canadian department store Hudson's Bay as the face of the spring 2015 campaign for its luxury clothing section called The Room. The campaign was photographed by Pamela Hanson. In June 2015, Evangelista was a chairwoman for the FiFi Awards, where she presented the awards for both men's and women's prestige fragrance of the year. In October 2015, Evangelista appeared on the cover of a book showcasing the work of hat designer Philip Treacy titled Philip Treacy: Hat Designer. The cover photograph of Evangelista was mentioned by Treacy as being "the most precious thing I own". Also in October, Evangelista starred in the campaign for Moschino's newest fragrance Fresh, photographed by Meisel.

In celebration of the 100th anniversary of British Vogue, a photograph of Evangelista originally taken in 1991 was chosen as the cover image for the book Vogue 100: A Century of Style, released in February 2016. In April 2016, Evangelista appeared on the cover of Zoo Magazine's 50th issue, photographed by singer and friend Bryan Adams. Also that month, Evangelista appeared on the cover of the book Age of the Supermodel, which features photographs taken by photographer Donna DeMari during the haute couture collections in Paris in 1991. Evangelista worked as fashion stylist for a photo spread titled "A Model Journey" in the September 2016 issue of Harper's Bazaar, which was based on her early years as a model. In September 2016, Evangelista reunited with Turlington and Campbell to appear in a campaign for the Elephant Crisis Fund. In November 2016, Evangelista was named Creative Director and Vice President of the Erasa Skin Care brand.

Evangelista is featured in the four-part Apple TV+ docuseries The Super Models. Premiered on September 20, 2023, the series also features Cindy Crawford, Naomi Campbell, and Christy Turlington and is directed by Roger Ross Williams and Larissa Bills.

== Cultural impact ==
Decades after uttering the comment about working for no less than $10,000 a day, the quote continued to be referenced in the media, being mentioned as late as July 2017. Evangelista herself has said, "I saw a movie, Mr. & Mrs. Smith, and there's a line in it where Brad Pitt says he won't get out of bed for less than half a million dollars. That's my line! Only now it's a half million and it's a man saying it." Over the years, various different T-shirts emblazoned with the $10,000 a day quote have been sold, and there is even an embroidered pillow containing the quote. The G Hotel in Galway, Ireland, includes a presidential suite that was named in honour of Evangelista, with its interiors designed by Treacy. The September 1991 issue of Vogue had a photo spread titled "Wild At Heart" that featured Evangelista, photographed by Lindbergh. One of the images from that spread is known as "The Wild Ones", and a platinum-palladium print of the image was sold at a Sotheby's auction for over $30,000. In October 2012, a picture of Evangelista and McMenamy that was photographed by Meisel for Vogue's October 1992 issue was sold at a Phillips auction for $86,500. In May 2016, a 1988 picture of Evangelista and five other models that was photographed by Lindbergh sold at a Sotheby's auction for $118,462. A 1996 photograph of Evangelista, titled "Linda Kissing Linda", which was originally featured in a Kenar advertisement, was selected by the Guggenheim Museum as "an example of the epitome of androgyny".

Evangelista influenced a number of female celebrities as either an inspiration or as a beauty icon. Among them are Victoria Beckham, Martha Stewart, models Candice Swanepoel, Kylie Bax, Kendall Jenner and Elsa Benítez, model-turned-actress Angie Harmon, and singer Rihanna.

Evangelista has drawn praise and accolades from many of the fashion industry's elite. Philip Treacy said, "Linda is the ultimate model of the past 50 years". Karl Lagerfeld once described Evangelista as "the most famous of all", and "the best model in the world", explaining, "Because she's a true model, pure and simple. She doesn't pretend or aspire to do anything else. She's just brilliant at what she does." Designer Stefano Gabbana said of Evangelista, "Linda is the model. If you talk about models of the sixties and seventies, the first name is Veruschka. In the eighties and nineties, it's Linda." David Bonnouvrier, one of the founders of DNA Model Management said, "Linda is the model of all time, to its strictest definition. She could be out of a Cecil Beaton picture, she could be out of a Guy Bourdin picture." Sozzani, the editor-in-chief of Vogue Italia, recounted that she would receive letters from readers concerned about "what would happen to the magazine if Linda got sick. Because it was all about Linda Evangelista. Her face had the most possibilities." Sozzani additionally stated, "For me, she is the model, not only for her beauty, but her attitude, her intelligence."

Meisel, to whom Evangelista is his "muse", considers her "extraordinarily photogenic". Fashion designer John Galliano has said that "inspiration hasn't been the same without her. She is an enormous influence on all the photographers and stylists." In his book Face Forward, the late makeup artist Kevyn Aucoin said of Evangelista, "I first worked with Linda in the early eighties and have yet to meet another model who was more involved in every aspect of her work. Her specialties were knowing what was best for her hair, makeup, styling, and lighting -- and Linda was always right. It was mind-boggling. Many of the unforgettable images of this haunting beauty were, in great degree, due to her involvement." This sentiment was echoed by fashion stylist Paul Cavaco, who described Evangelista as "the greatest collaborator of all time."

Evangelista was referred to as "the supermodel's supermodel" by Marcus Chang of T: The New York Times Style Magazine. According to Shane Watson of The Evening Standard, "Of all the supermodels, Linda was most responsible for elevating the job into an art form, pushing up the fees, piling on the expectations and generally ensuring that by the end of the Eighties the world of the top model had become as lucrative, glamorous and shrouded in enigma as that of the Hollywood star".

== Activism and awards ==
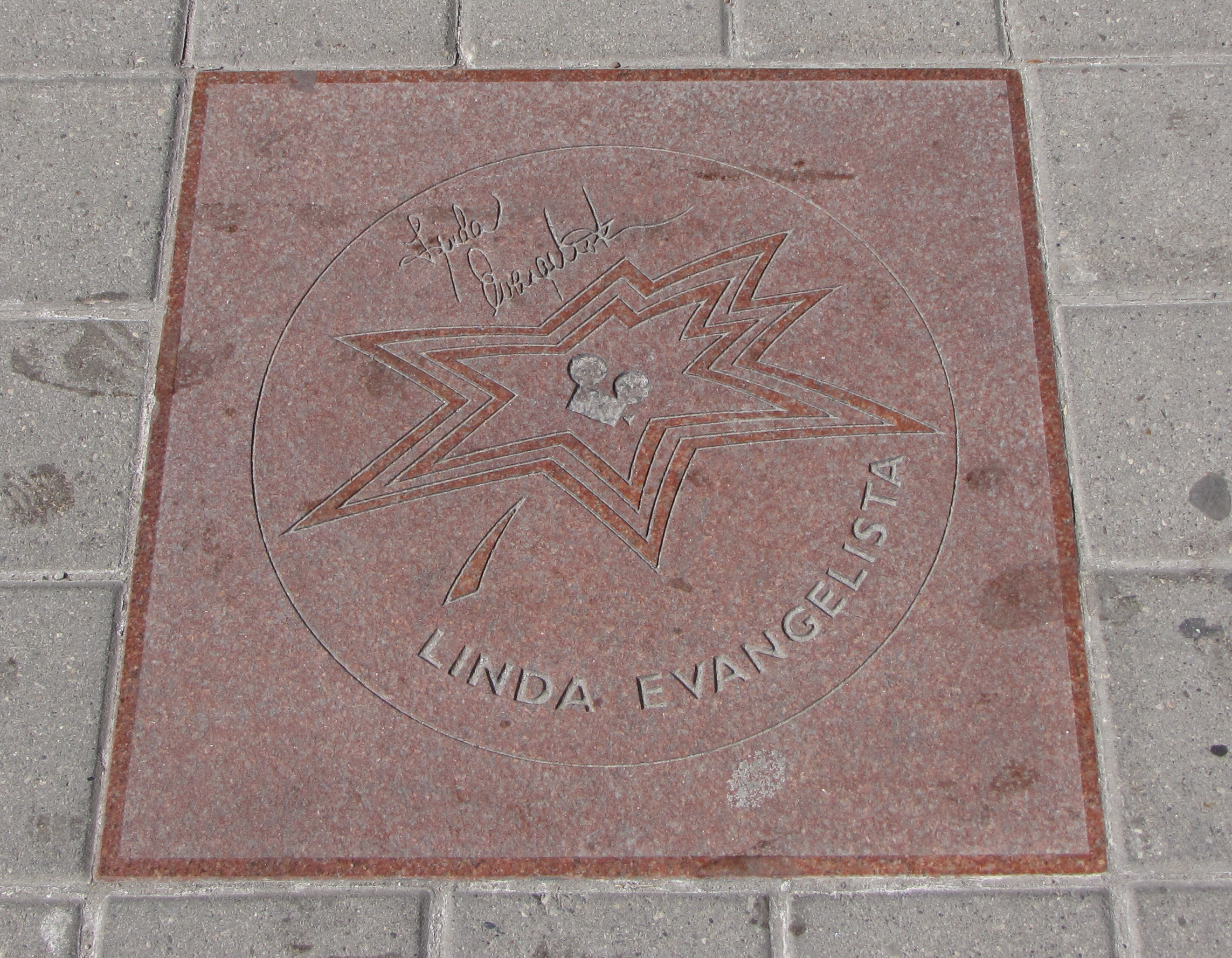
Evangelista's star on Canada's Walk of Fame

Evangelista is an activist for HIV/AIDS research and awareness, as well as for breast cancer research and awareness. She was one of the icons in the Viva Glam campaign for the Mac AIDS Fund. In October 2013, she was the host of amfAR's Inaugural Inspiration Gala in Rio de Janeiro, Brazil. Evangelista also supports the Elton John AIDS Foundation and is an advocate for LGBT concerns.

In 1996, she was the recipient of VH1's Fashion Awards Lifetime Achievement Award, which was presented to her by Anna Wintour, editor-in-chief of Vogue. In June 2003, she received a star on Canada's Walk of Fame in Toronto. In 2005, she was named as a World Fashion Icon by the Women's World Awards in Leipzig, Germany. In March 2008, she was chosen as "The Greatest Supermodel of All Time" by a viewer poll for the CBC Television show Fashion File.

== Personal life ==
=== Relationships ===
In 1987, Evangelista married Gérald Marie, who was the head of Elite Model Management's Paris office. They were divorced in 1993. She also dated actor Kyle MacLachlan, whom she first met on a photoshoot for Barneys New York in 1992. The couple became engaged in 1995 but broke up in 1998. Afterward, she dated French football player Fabien Barthez. She became pregnant but miscarried, six months into the pregnancy. The couple broke up in 2000, reunited in 2001, and then officially ended their relationship in 2002.

=== Child support case ===
In October 2006, Evangelista gave birth to a son but refused to name his father, sparking rumours. While pregnant, she appeared on the August 2006 cover of Vogue. In late June 2011, Evangelista filed court papers that revealed her son was fathered by billionaire Frenchman François-Henri Pinault, whom Evangelista had dated for four months in late 2005 and early 2006. Pinault later married actress Salma Hayek. After several court appearances aimed at establishing a child-support agreement, on August 1, 2011, Evangelista formally filed for a child support order in Manhattan Family Court, seeking $46,000 in monthly child support from Pinault. It was reported that if granted, this amount "would probably be the largest support order in the history of the family court". A heavily publicized child support trial began on May 3, 2012, and included testimony from both Pinault and Evangelista, with Evangelista's attorney claiming that Pinault had never supported the child. Several days into the trial, on May 7, 2012, Evangelista and Pinault reached an out-of-court settlement.

=== Religion ===
In a 1997 interview, Evangelista said that she was a practicing Catholic and that her favourite book was the Bible.

=== Failed cosmetic procedure and lawsuit ===
In September 2021, Evangelista explained why she had withdrawn from public life and not been working. Five years previously she had undergone the cosmetic fat removal procedure cryolipolysis, under the brand name CoolSculpting, but the procedure resulted in paradoxical adipose hyperplasia (PAH). Evangelista initiated legal action against CoolSculpting's owner Zeltiq Aesthetics, a subsidiary of Allergan, seeking $50 million in damages for emotional distress and lost income. Evangelista settled the case in July 2022.

=== Health issues ===
In 2023, Evangelista revealed that she had been diagnosed with breast cancer in December 2018. She received chemotherapy and underwent a bilateral mastectomy; the cancer returned in 2022 in her pectoral muscle, for which she also received chemotherapy.

== Filmography ==
List of appearances in film and television
Year	Title	Role	Notes
1991	Models: The Film	Herself	Documentary
1994	Prêt-à-Porter	Herself (uncredited)	
1995	Unzipped	Herself (uncredited)	Documentary
1995	Catwalk	Herself	Documentary
2013	Mademoiselle C	Herself	Documentary
2013	Mode als Religion (Fashion as a Religion)	Herself	Documentary
2017	George Michael Freedom	Herself	Documentary
2023	The Super Models	Herself	Documentary series; also executive producer

List of appearances in music videos
Year	Title	Artist	Notes
1990	"Freedom! '90"	George Michael	
1992	"Too Funky"	George Michael	
