= Walter J. Dodd =

American radiologist

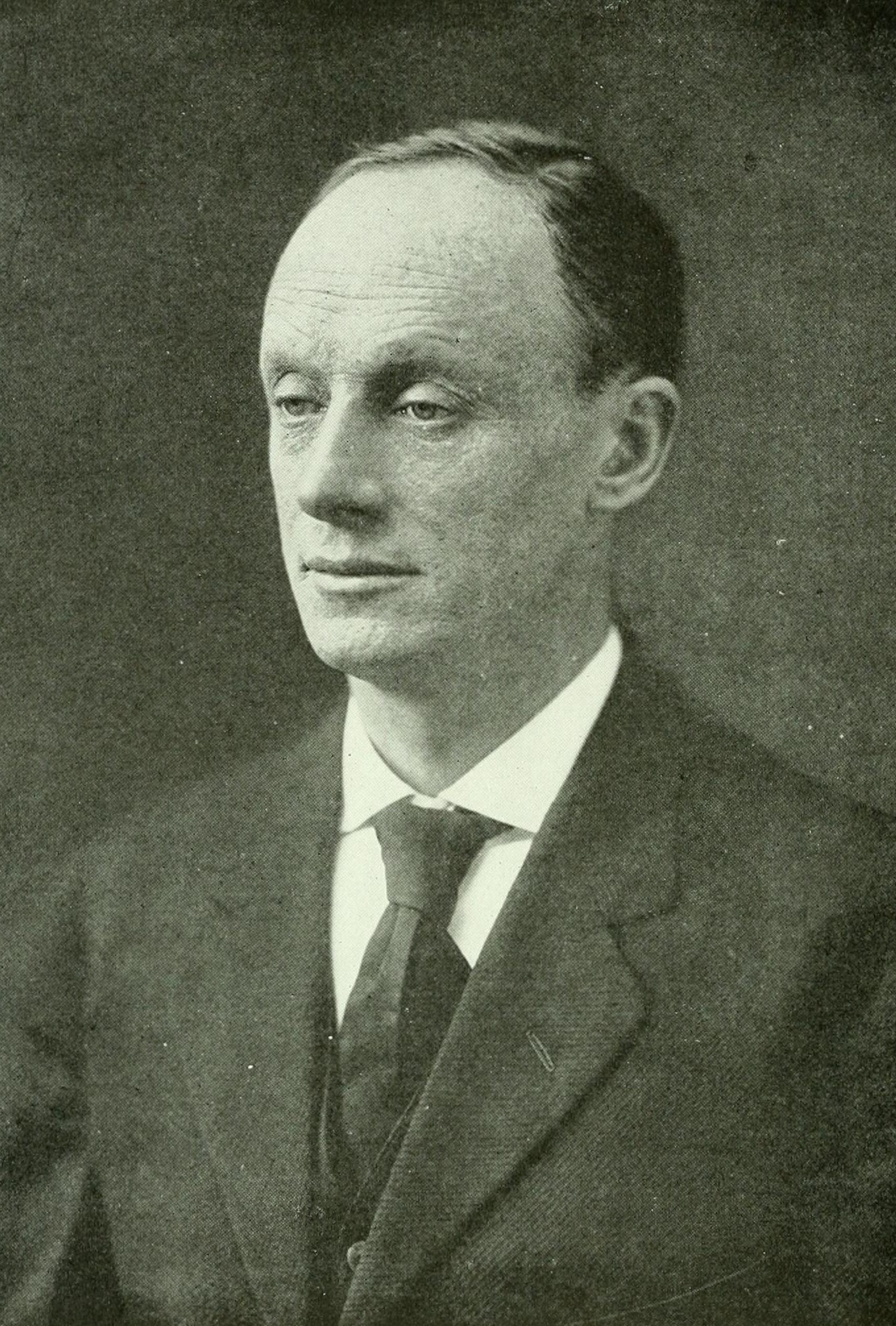
- Born: 22 April 1869; London, England, U.K.
- Died: 19 December 1916 (aged 47); Boston, Massachusetts, U.S.
- Resting place: Mount Auburn Cemetery
- Education: Vermont Medical School, M.D. (1908)
- Scientific career
- Fields: X-rays

Walter James Dodd (22 April 1869 – 19 December 1916) was a physician and one of the first radiologists in the United States. He was an early innovator in the use of X-rays in medicine, and suffered the consequences. He underwent over 50 surgical procedures to treat X-ray damage to his skin and had several appendages amputated. He ultimately died from X-ray induced cancer.

== Early life ==
Dodd was born in London in 1869. His father died when he was young and he was sent to Boston to live with his sister. He dropped out of school and worked as a janitor in a chemistry laboratory at Harvard College. He was curious about the lectures and experiments and gradually learned general chemistry impressing a professor at Harvard.

== Career ==
He became an apothecary at Massachusetts General Hospital in 1892, and soon after a registered pharmacist. Among the apothecary's duties was to take photographs of the hospital's patients. He quickly picked up the skills of photography, both taking photographs and developing film.

In 1895, Wilhelm Röntgen published his paper showing that X-rays could be used to take photographs of bones. Dodd quickly became the hospital's radiographer. He built several early X-ray generators. He was unaware of the dangers of X-rays and, by 1898, he had required skin grafts to repair X-ray burns.

In 1900, he entered Harvard Medical School to become fully trained as a physician, but found he needed to be away from his work to study better. He transferred to Vermont Medical School, where he earned his MD in 1908.

== Personal life ==
Dodd had visible deformities due to X-ray exposure. By 1910, he had burns and scars on his face and several fingers had been partially amputated.

Dodd died 19 December 1916, at his home in Boston.
