= Massachusetts General Hospital Academy =

The Massachusetts General Hospital Academy is an educational organization for physicians, nurses, specialists, and other health professionals who diagnose, treat and care for patients across a variety of therapeutic areas, like cardiology, neurology, oncology and more. It is directly organized and managed by the Department of Postgraduate Education at Massachusetts General Hospital, which is owned by Partners HealthCare, the largest healthcare provider in Massachusetts.

The Academy organizes and produces CME activities—like one-day live symposia and online webcasts—that educate attendees about effective clinical practice for treating health disorders, like fibromyalgia and dementia.

== Faculty and staff ==
Faculty for Academy activities and programs come from within Massachusetts General Hospital as well as other prominent educational institutions like Yale University and Mount Sinai School of Medicine.
