= International Association for Physicians in Aesthetic Medicine =

US professional organization

The International Association for Physicians in Aesthetic Medicine (IAPAM) is a voluntary association founded to unite licensed physicians who practice aesthetic medicine, by assisting in their professional and personal development.

== Description ==
The IAPAM membership is open to licensed Doctor of Medicine (M.D.), Doctor of Osteopathic Medicine (D.O.), Physicians Assistants (P.A.), Nurse Practitioners (N.P.), and the medical students studying for those degrees. The goal of the IAPAM is to offer education, ethical standards, and credentialing to those professionals working towards discrete certifications in Aesthetic Medicine.

The IAPAM was founded in 2006, and is headquartered in Las Vegas, Nevada. There are currently over 600 physician and associate members from various parts of the world, including the United States, Canada, the UK, Singapore, South Africa, Colombia, Venezuela, Norway, South Korea, Israel, Pakistan, Germany, Egypt, Argentina, Italy, Philippines, Jamaica, Mexico, Taiwan and Indonesia.

The IAPAM has two advisory boards. The medical advisory board is composed of experienced physicians, including board certified dermatologists, and other physicians specializing in aesthetic medicine. In addition, there is a business advisory board which is composed of several industry experts including: Dr Toni Stockton MD, Dr Jennifer Wild DO, Dr Bill Fulton MD, Jeff Russell, and medical spa consultant, Cindy Graf. The program was designed by physicians for physicians and other healthcare providers. They direct the clinical training, and the business advisory board provides business expertise to practitioners as well as manages the day-to-day operations of the IAPAM and its events.

== Core competencies ==
The IAPAM focuses on providing clinical instruction pursuant to the following core competencies in the field of Aesthetic Medicine:

- Botox Training for Physicians, Nurse Practitioners, Dentists, and other health care professionals
- Light-based therapies (hair removal, laser treatments)
- Cosmetic injectables (Botox, soft tissue fillers)
- Skin rejuvenation (medical grade chemical peels, microdermabrasion
- Medical weight management.

== See also ==
- American Society for Aesthetic Plastic Surgery
- American Academy of Dermatology
