= Brachioplasty =

Surgical modification of the upper arms and chest wall

A brachioplasty, from Ancient Greek βραχίων (brakhíon), meaning "arm", and πλαστός (plastós), meaning "moulded", commonly called an arm lift, is a surgical procedure to reshape and provide improved contour to the upper arms and connecting area of chest wall. Although "brachioplasty" is commonly used to describe a specific procedure for the upper arms, the term can also be used to describe any surgical arm contouring. Brachioplasty is often used to address issues such as excessive loose skin or excessive fat in the arms when it does not respond well to diet and exercise.

== Brachioplasty techniques ==
=== Liposuction of the arms ===
The least-invasive manner to contour the upper arms is to simply remove extra fat via liposuction. However, traditional deep liposuction often leaves sagging and wrinkled skin. An alternative to this is Circumferential para-Axillary Superficial Tumescent (CAST) liposuction, which maximizes the skin retraction.

=== Hidden/minimal incision brachioplasty ===
Under the right conditions such as adequate skin elasticity and minimal excess skin, the surgical incision for the brachioplasty can be placed under the arm. This allows for easy concealment of the scar. Minimal incision brachioplasty includes lipoplasty of the upper arm, wide-axillary and upper-arm skin excision, and dermal suspension of the upper-arm skin to the axillary fascia.

=== Traditional brachioplasty ===
The typical brachioplasty involves removing excessive loose skin via surgical excision, leaving a significant scar along the bottom of the upper arms.

=== Extended brachioplasty ===
If there is also a significant amount of loose skin that goes from the upper arms and continues along the chest wall, an extended brachioplasty may be called for. In an extended brachioplasty, the incision and excision of skin continues along the upper arm onto the area under the arm along the chest wall.

=== Fish-incision brachioplasty ===
This method is used for patients with an enormous amount of soft tissue excess. Fish-incision brachioplasty uses mathematical measurements and anatomic marking that allows the preoperative marking of the incision in the shape of a fish.

=== Non-excisional brachioplasty ===
This technique is used to decrease the post- operative seroma formation and nerve injury. In this method liposuction is done for the arm with excessive liposuction under the area of excision to make it paper thin. Only the skin over the marked area is excised followed by invagination of the tissue and closure with dermal to dermal sutures and skin edge closure.

=== Superficial fascial system suspension ===
In this procedure anchoring of the arm flap to the axillary fascia is secured along with strong superficial fascial system repair of incisions. This method reduces the risk of widening or migration of scars and unnatural contours.

=== Use of molds ===
This technique uses a mold to mark the incision in an italic double S-shape for better incision control, symmetrical and smaller scars. This method has often been used in association with other brachioplasty procedures.

=== Non-surgical options ===
Although the long term results may not be as significant as surgical excision, there are other options to improve skin laxity and fatty excess of the upper arms without the need for a visible scar. The most common treatment is liposuction with possible laser, ultrasound or sub dermal helium plasma.

== Complications ==
Some of the possible complications associated with brachioplasty include:

- Risks of anesthesia, including allergic reaction
- Surgical risks such as bleeding or infection
- Blood clots that may cause potentially fatal cardiovascular complications, such as heart attack, deep vein thrombosis or stroke
- Collapsed lung
- Fluid build-up under the wound
- Tissue death along the wound, or skin loss
- Sensory nerve damage, which may cause prolonged or permanent numbness in the upper arm or even in the forearm
- Prolonged swelling
- Damage to underlying tissues such as muscles
- Asymmetry (unevenness) of the skin
- Unsightly, inflamed or itchy scarring
- Further surgery to treat complications.
