= Carboxytherapy =

Dermatology intervention

Carboxytherapy is a non-surgical cosmetic medicine treatment for dermatology. Carboxytherapy employs injections or transdermal application to infuse gaseous carbon dioxide below the skin into the subcutaneous tissue through a needle or skin. It has a necrotizing effect on fat tissue fat cells, stimulates blood flow, improves the skin's elasticity and reduces the appearance of cellulite. It has also become a popular treatment for stretch marks. It is non-toxic and less invasive than operations like liposuction. Carboxytherapy leads to a temporary decrease in subcutaneous fat but has shown to reoccur again after a 28 week period. It can be applied for those with androgenic alopecia or alopecia areata.

As of 2018, Carboxytherapy has not approved by the FDA. Risks include inadvertent lipolysis and emphysema.

Carboxytherapy was discovered in 1932 in Royat, France after patients had been soaking in carbon-rich pools with wounds healing and circulatory diseases improving such as Raynaud's syndrome. In the 1950s French doctors began injecting carbon dioxide for treating cellulite.

== Uses ==
- Alopecia
- Cellulite
- Morphea
- Scars
- Skin rejuvenation
- Skin laxity deficiency
- Stretch marks
- Striae distensae

== See also ==
- Bath bomb
- Injection lipolysis
- Mesotherapy
