= Contour threads =

Threads used in plastic surgery

Contour threads are used in cosmetic/plastic surgery to vertically lift facial tissues that have dropped ("ptosed") or become sunken with age. The "ptosis" or descent of facial tissues with aging is a universal phenomenon to which much cosmetic facial surgery is directed.

Strands of 2/0 Prolene monofilament thread, with little notches cut into their sides, are placed in the subcutaneous plane under the ptosed facial skin. These are anchored under secure points in fronto-occipitalis and temporalis tissues. Dropped or "ptosed" facial skin is then elevated onto the barbed threads, and stay elevated because of the barbs. Thus the patient gets a "facelift", without any scalpel work and without any removal of skin.

In the event that a patient is unhappy with the results, the threads can be readily removed and the patient's face thence returns to its position prior to treatment. Thus, Contour threads have negligible permanent "biological cost", as the effect is reversible. Effects last for a number of years, quoted as 2–5 years, after which time the positive effect is gradually lost and the patient's face returns to its state prior to treatment.
