= Schwartz Center for Compassionate Healthcare =

The Schwartz Center for Compassionate Healthcare
- Founded: 1995
- Founder: Kenneth B. Schwartz (posthumous)
- Type: healthcare related non-profit organization
- Location: 399 REVOLUTION DR., Somerville MA
- Employees: 25
- Volunteers: 50
- Website: www.theschwartzcenter.org

The Schwartz Center for Compassionate Healthcare (informally the Schwartz Center; formerly the Kenneth B. Schwartz Center or KBS) is a non-profit organization established in 1995 to increase compassion and more meaningful collaboration between patients and medical professionals.

The Schwartz center has more than 900 organizational members in the U.S., U.K. Canada, Australia and New Zealand.

== History ==
In November 1994, Boston health care attorney Kenneth Schwartz was diagnosed with lung cancer. During his 10-month illness, he discovered the importance of the human connection between caregiver and patient, saying that “the smallest acts of kindness made the unbearable bearable.”

At the end of his life Ken outlined the organization he wanted to create. It would be a center that would promote compassion in medicine, encouraging the sorts of caregiver-patient relationships that made all the difference to him. He founded the Schwartz Center in 1995, just days before his death.

== Schwartz Rounds ==
The center promotes their trademarked Schwartz Rounds, which they claim take place in more than 600 healthcare organizations throughout the U.S., Canada, Australia and New Zealand and more than 300 throughout the U.K. and Ireland. The aim is to offer healthcare providers a regularly scheduled time to discuss the social and emotional issues they face in caring for patients and families, and to share their experiences, thoughts and feelings on topics drawn from actual patient cases with colleagues from other healthcare disciplines. The sessions are led by a trained facilitator. The premise is that caregivers are better able to make personal connections with patients and colleagues when they have greater insight into their own responses and feelings. The rounds have been shown to reduce stress in doctors who attend them, and to improve the capacity to manage the psychosocial aspects of patient care.
