= Fat removal procedures =

Cosmetic surgery to remove unwanted adipose tissue

Fat removal procedures are used mostly in cosmetic surgery with the intention of removing unwanted adipose tissue. The procedure may be invasive, as with liposuction, or noninvasive using laser therapy, radiofrequency, ultrasound or cold (cryoablation or cryolipolysis) to reduce fat, sometimes in combination with injections.

Fat is sometimes removed from one location to another on a person in an autograft, such as in some breast reconstruction and breast augmentation procedures. These techniques are distinct from bariatric surgery, which aims to treat obesity by minimizing food consumption or by interfering with the absorption of food during digestion, and from injection lipolysis, which relies solely on injections marketed as causing lipolysis.

== Invasive ==
=== Liposuction ===
Liposuction is a type of plastic surgery that removes fat from the human body in an attempt to change its shape. Evidence does not support an effect on weight beyond a couple of months and it does not appear to affect obesity related problems. In the United States it is the most commonly done cosmetic surgery.

Serious complications include deep vein thrombosis, organ perforation, bleeding, and infection. Death occurs in about one per ten thousand cases.

The procedure may be performed under general, regional, or local anesthesia and involves using a cannula and negative pressure (suction) to suck out fat. It is believed to work best on individuals of normal or near normal weight and good skin elasticity.

Post operational downtime can last anywhere from 2 – 4 weeks to 3 full months for patients to fully heal and be able to resume normal activities.

== Noninvasive ==
=== Ultrasound ===
Focused thermal ultrasound techniques work by raising the tissue temperature up to 48 °C, resulting in coagulative necrosis of adipocytes, with sparing of vessels and nerves. Passive heating of the skin may also induce collagen remodeling.

Hydrolipoclasy is a technique that is being studied as an alternative to liposuction. It involves injecting a hypotonic solution into an area of fat and then subjecting it to ultrasound waves.

=== Low level laser light ===
Low level laser light reduces the stability of adipocyte cell membranes, allowing cells to release their stores of fat without damaging the cell.

=== Cryolipolysis ===
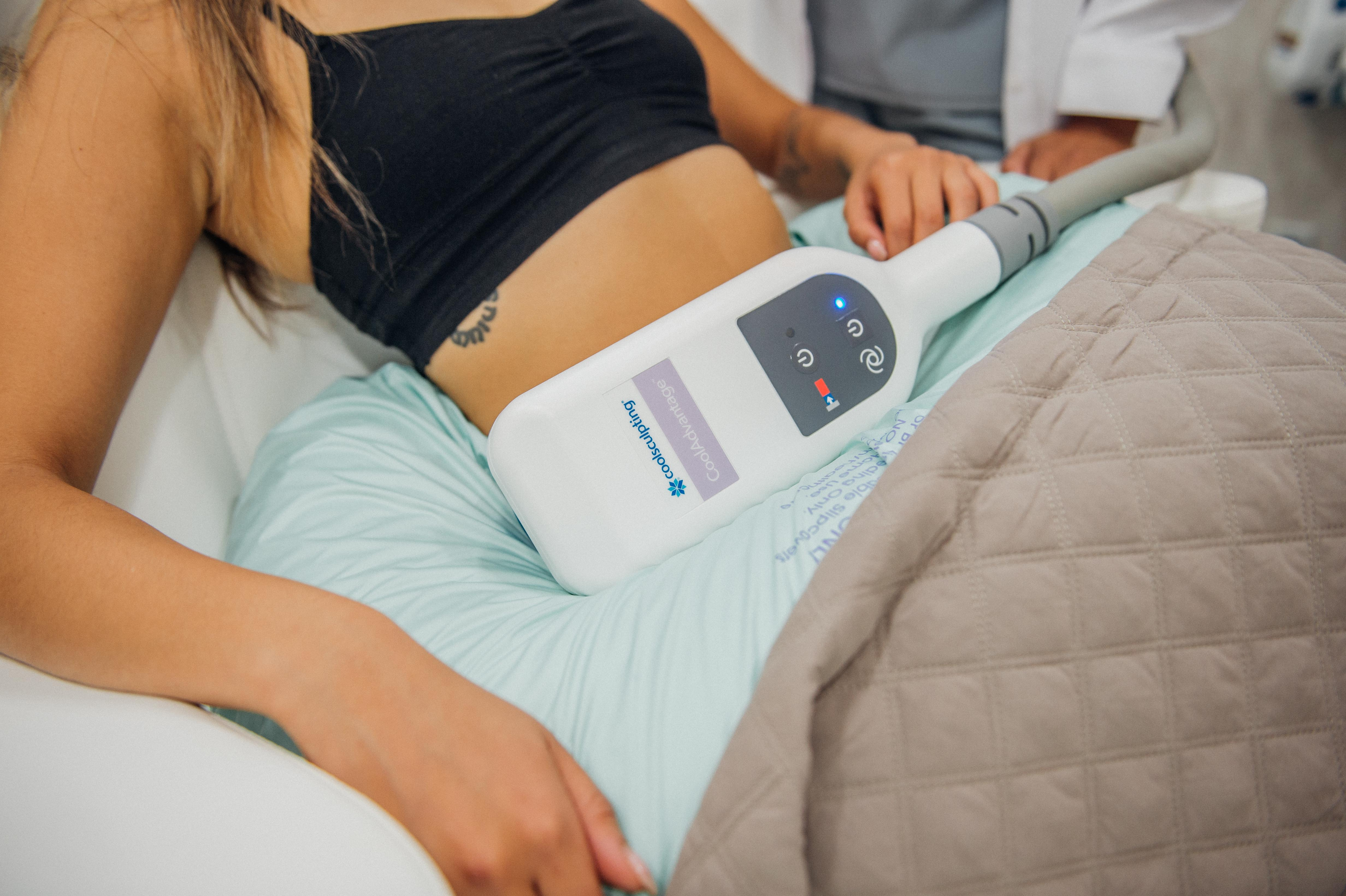
Patient with cryolipolysis applicator

Cryolipolysis is the removal of fat by freezing. It involves controlled application of cooling within the temperature range of −11 to +5 °C (+12.2 to +41 °F) for the localized reduction of fat deposits, intended to reshape the contours of the body. The degree of exposure to cooling causes cell death of subcutaneous fat tissue, without apparent damage to the overlying skin. It appears primarily applicable to limited discrete fat bulges.

Adverse effects include transient local redness, bruising and numbness of the skin, and these are expected to subside. Typically, sensory deficits (numbness) will subside within a month. The effect on peripheral nerves was investigated and failed to show permanent detrimental results.

Another adverse effect is paradoxical adipose hypertrophy (PAH) which causes fat tissue to grow larger rather than become reduced in size as a consequence of the procedure. Supermodel Linda Evangelista has initiated legal action for damage caused by PAH. Some studies indicate that PAH side effects are common on a per-patient basis, since a typical patient receives multiple treatments.

Based on the premise that fat cells are more easily damaged by cooling than skin cells (such as popsicle panniculitis), cryolipolysis was developed to apply low temperatures to tissue via thermal conduction. In order to avoid frostbite, a specific temperature level and exposure are determined, such as 45 minutes at −10 °C (14 °F). While the process is not fully understood, it appears that fatty tissue that is cooled below body temperature, but above freezing, undergoes localized cell death ("apoptosis") followed by a local inflammatory response that gradually over the course of several months results in a reduction of the fatty tissue layer.

Typical cost per treatment area varies depending on location. Price in the US ranges from $750 to $1,500, with UK prices about £750 per area to be treated and in India, the Coolsculpting cost typically ranges from ₹60,000 to ₹115,000. In the U.S., the CoolSculpting procedure is FDA-cleared for the treatment of visible fat bulges in the submental area, thigh, abdomen and flank, along with bra fat, back fat, underneath the buttocks, and upper arm.

=== Injection lipolysis ===
Injection lipolysis is a procedure that reduces localized subcutaneous fat deposits, most commonly submental fat (double chin). This technique involves the injection of lipolytic substances, such as deoxycholic acid (branded as Kybella in the United States), directly into the targeted fat tissue. Deoxycholic acid is a naturally occurring bile acid that aids in the breakdown and absorption of dietary fat. When injected into subcutaneous fat, it causes the dissolution of the fat cell membranes, causing them to die. The destroyed fat cells are then gradually eliminated by the body's natural metabolic processes over the following weeks. While the procedure is generally considered safe when performed by a qualified healthcare professional, potential side effects may include swelling, bruising, numbness, and rarely, nerve injury in the treated area.

== Regulatory status ==
In 2010, Zerona, another low-level laser treatment, was cleared for marketing by the FDA as an infrared lamp. Zeltiq obtained FDA marketing clearance for cryolipolysis of the flanks, and in 2012 received marketing clearance for cryolipolysis of the abdomen. This treatment has also been cleared for the treatment of the upper arm, back fat, bra fat, banana roll, submental area, and thighs.

Various lipolysis techniques including injection lipolysis, RF, laser, ultrasound, and cryolipolysis were forbidden in France by a decree of the French Public Health Authority in 2011. The decree was revised in 2012, distinguishing invasive techniques, which remain forbidden, from permitted non-invasive techniques; laser, RF, ultrasound and cryolipolysis that did not penetrate the skin became legal, and injection lipolysis and mesotherapy remained illegal. Laser devices that involve inserting the probe through the skin transcutaneously but do not suck out the liquefied material are also prohibited. Surgeons are permitted to perform surgical liposuction techniques using laser-assisted lipolysis so long as suction is performed.
