= Stretch marks =

Form of scarring

- Other names: stria, striae distensae
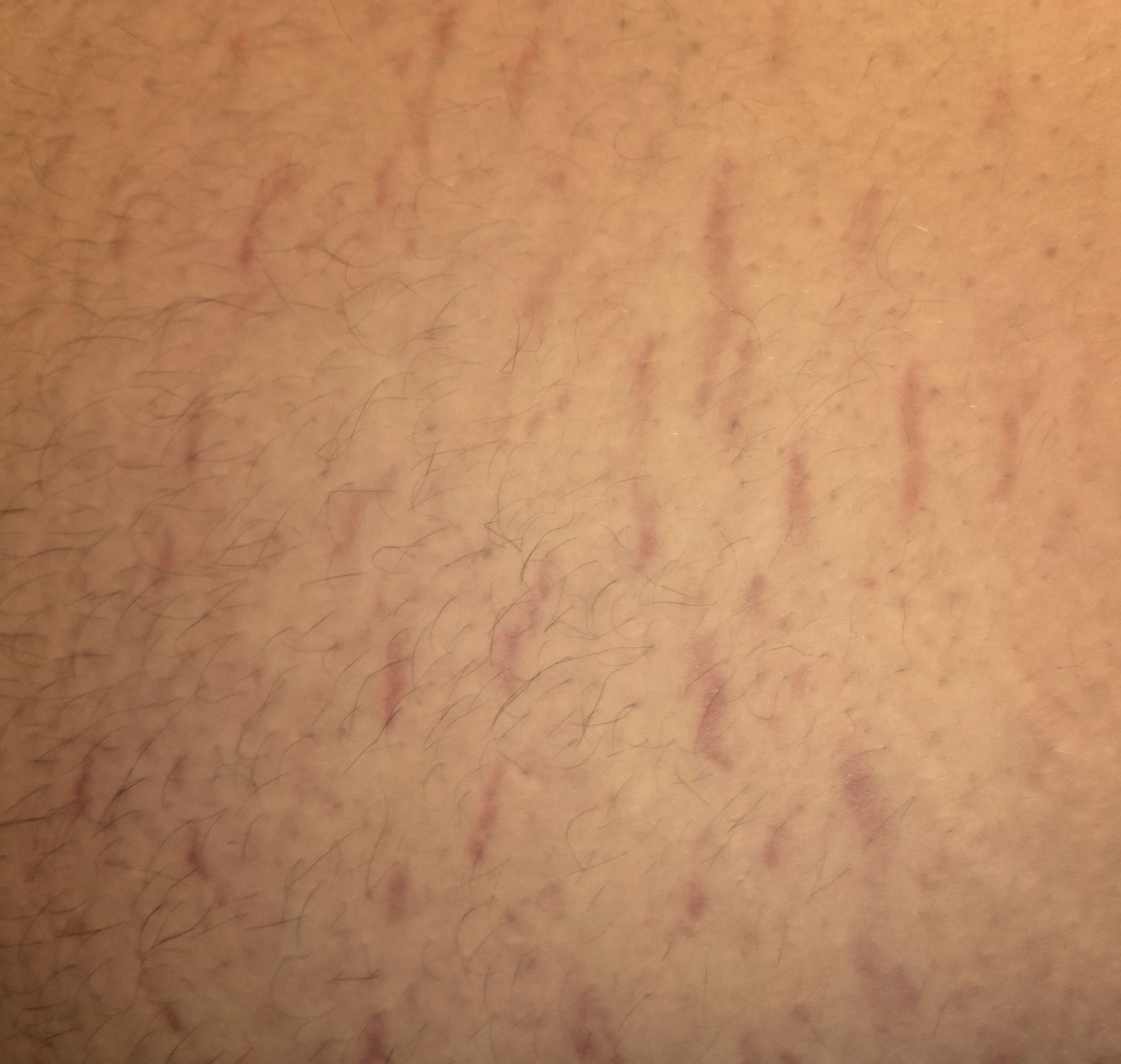
- multiple recent (reddish) and a few older (white) stretch marks
- Specialty: Dermatology

Stretch marks, also known as striae (/ˈstraɪiː/) or striae distensae, are a form of scarring on the skin with an off-color hue. Over time, they may diminish or change in appearance, but will not disappear completely. Striae are caused by tearing of the dermis during periods of rapid growth of the body, such as during puberty or pregnancy, in which they usually form during the last trimester. Usually on the belly, these striae also commonly occur on the breasts, thighs, hips, lower back, and buttocks. Pregnancy-related striae are known as striae gravidarum. Striae may also be influenced by the hormonal changes associated with puberty, pregnancy, bodybuilding, or hormone replacement therapy. There is no evidence that creams used during pregnancy prevent stretch marks. Once they have formed, there is no clearly effective treatment, though various methods have been attempted and studied.

== Signs and symptoms ==
Striae, or "stretch marks", begin as reddish or purple lesions which can appear anywhere on the body, but are most likely to appear in places where larger amounts of fat are stored. The most common places are the abdomen (especially near the navel), breasts, upper arms, underarms, back, thighs (both inner and outer), hips, and buttocks. Over time, they tend to atrophy and lose pigmentation. The affected areas appear empty, and are soft to the touch.

They can (but do not always) cause a burning and itching sensation, as well as emotional distress. They pose no inherent health risk on their own, and do not compromise the body's ability to function normally and repair itself. However, some people dislike the way stretch marks look. Young women are generally affected the most and often seek treatment for them from a dermatologist and following pregnancy.

== Causes ==
Stretch marks appear to be caused by stretching of the skin. This is especially true when there is an increase in cortisone – an increase in cortisone levels can increase the probability or severity of stretch marks by reducing the skin's pliability. More specifically, it affects the dermis by preventing the fibroblasts from forming collagen and elastin fibers necessary to keep rapidly growing skin taut; this can create a lack of supportive material as the skin is stretched, and lead to dermal and epidermal tearing, which in turn can produce scarring in the form of stretch marks. This is particularly the case when there is new tissue growth, which can interfere with the underlying physical support of the dermis or epidermis by displacing the supportive tissue.

Examples of cases where stretch marks are common include weight gain (in the form of fat and/or muscle), pregnancy, and adolescent growth spurts, though it is also noted that some medications, as well as other medical conditions and diseases, may increase the likelihood of stretch marks appearing. Common medications that can contribute to stretch marks include "corticosteroid creams, lotions and pills and chronic use of oral or systemic steroids". Medical conditions that can contribute to stretch marks include Ehlers–Danlos syndrome, Cushing's syndrome, Marfan syndrome, and adrenal gland diseases.

According to Dr. Richard Nolan, an orthopedic surgeon, Asians are more prone to stretch marks.

=== Pregnancy ===
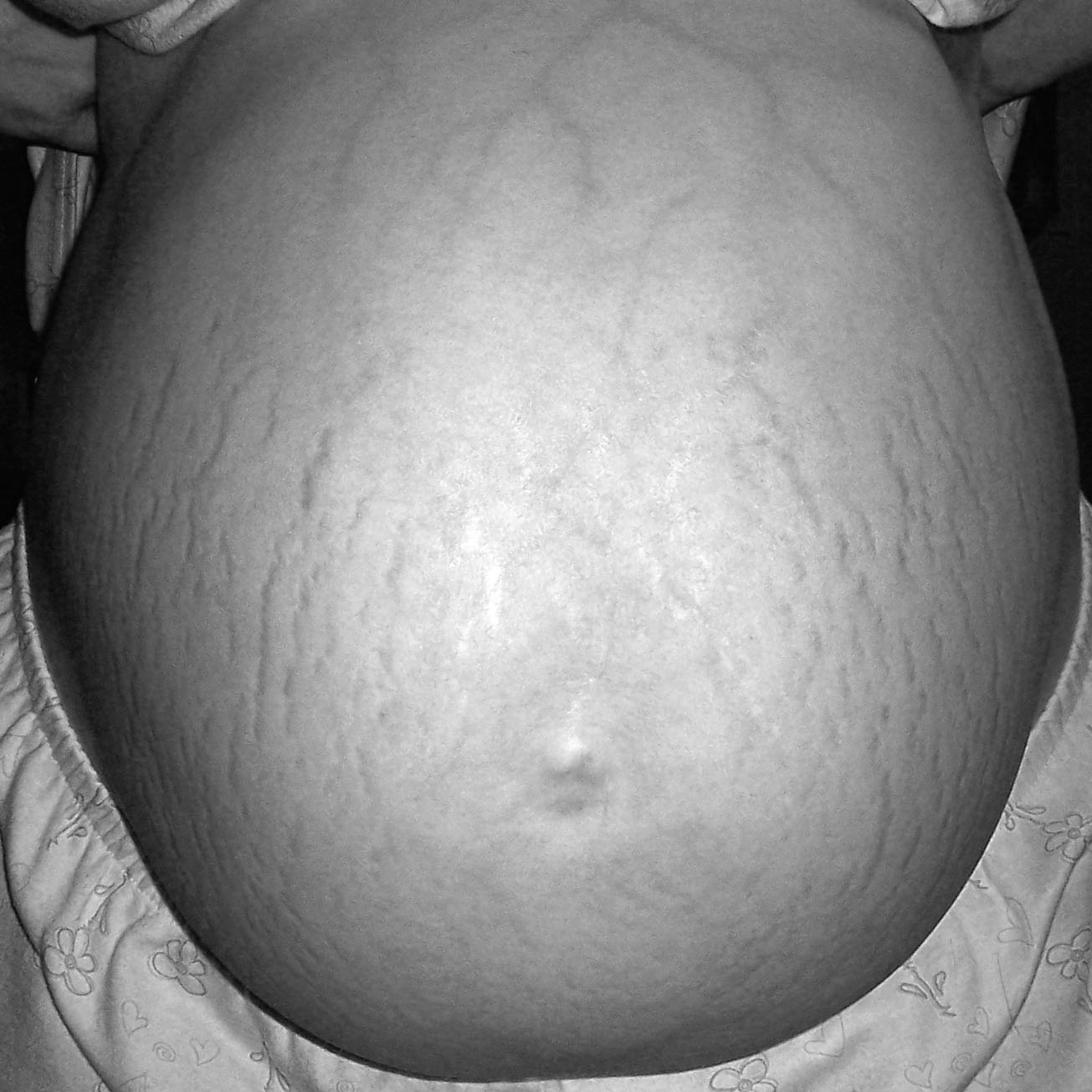
Striae gravidarum in a pregnant woman at 38 weeks

Pregnancy stretch marks, also known as striae gravidarum, are a specific form of scarring of the skin of the abdominal area due to rapid expansion of the uterus as well as sudden weight gain during pregnancy. About 90% of pregnant women are affected.

A number of additional factors appear to promote the appearance of stretch marks: one study of 324 women, done just after they had given birth, demonstrated that low maternal age, high body mass index, weight gain over 15 kg (33 pounds) and higher neonatal birth weight were independently correlated with the occurrence of striae. Teenagers were found to be at the highest risk of developing severe striae.

These skin marks are symptoms of pregnancy caused by the tearing of the dermis, resulting in atrophy and loss of rete ridges. These scars often appear as reddish or bluish streaks on the abdomen, and can also appear on the breasts and thighs.

Mechanical distension and rapidly developing areas of the body during pregnancy (such as the abdomen, breasts, and thighs) are most commonly associated with striae formation. Some have suggested that relaxin and estrogen combined with higher levels of cortisol during pregnancy can cause an accumulation of mucopolysaccharides, which increases water absorption of connective tissue, making it prime for tearing under mechanical stress. There also seems to be an association between higher body mass indices and in women with bigger babies and the incidence and severity of striae. Also, younger women seem to be at higher risk of developing striae during pregnancy.

The prevalence and severity of striae gravidarum varies among populations. The current literature suggest that in the general population of the United States, there is a 50% to 90% prevalence of striae associated with pregnancy, partly as a result of the normal hormonal changes associated with pregnancy and partly due to stretching of skin fibers. Many women experience striae gravidarum during their first pregnancy. An anonymous survey of postpartum women conducted in 2004 found that 43% percent of those surveyed developed striae gravidarum before 24 weeks of gestation. Many women who develop lesions during the first pregnancy do not develop them during later pregnancies. Genetic factors such as genealogy and skin color also seem to be predictive in the appearance of striae.

== Prevention ==
Collagen and elastin are proteins in the skin that contribute to the skin's strength, resilience, flexibility, and help skin that has been stretched to recover its original state. Boosting the production of collagen and elastin helps prevent stretch marks from occurring. Stretch marks can also derive from nutritional deficiencies. Consuming foods that contribute to the skin's health, such as zinc-rich foods, protein-rich foods, and foods high in vitamin A, C, and D, can help suppress stretch marks. A systematic review has not found evidence that creams and oils are useful for preventing or reducing stretch marks in pregnancy. The safety in pregnancy of one ingredient, Centella asiatica, has been questioned. Evidence on treatments for reducing the appearance of the scars after pregnancy is limited.

== Treatment ==
There are no clearly useful treatments for stretch marks, although there are many different suggestions on how to remove them or lessen their appearance.

Various efforts that have been tried including laser treatments, glycolic acid, and microdermabrasion. Tretinoin (0.1% w/w), which is a retinoid, has found to be effective on early stretch marks in several studies. Hyaluronic acid also improves the appearance of stretch marks. Topical tretinoin is categorized by the United States Food and Drug Administration (FDA) as a known teratogen (causing malformations in fetuses) in animals, without adequate human studies on safety in pregnancy.

Carboxytherapy is a known procedure; however, there is a lack of evidence to support how effective it is.

Research into a new skin grafting technique called "microcolumn grafting / micrografting", which uses needles to take autologous full-thickness skin biopsies, is also being investigated as a potential treatment for stretch marks.

== History ==
Since ancient times, people have sought remedies to prevent stretch marks during pregnancy. Both ancient Greeks and Romans used olive oil, while Ethiopians and Somalis used frankincense.

Striae were first recognized by Roederer in 1773, and were later histologically described by Troisier and Ménétrier in 1889. In 1936, Nardelli made the first morphologically correct descriptions.

== Terminology ==
Medical terminology for these kinds of markings includes: striae atrophicae, vergetures, stria distensae, striae cutis distensae, lineae atrophicae, linea albicante, or simply striae.

== Gallery ==
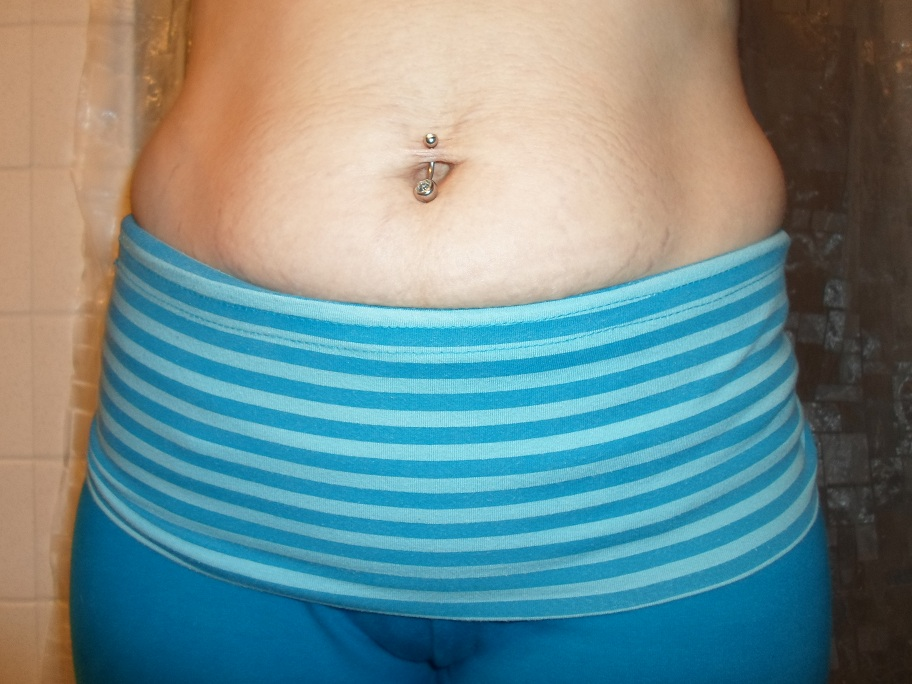
Stretch marks from pregnancy >1 year postpartum

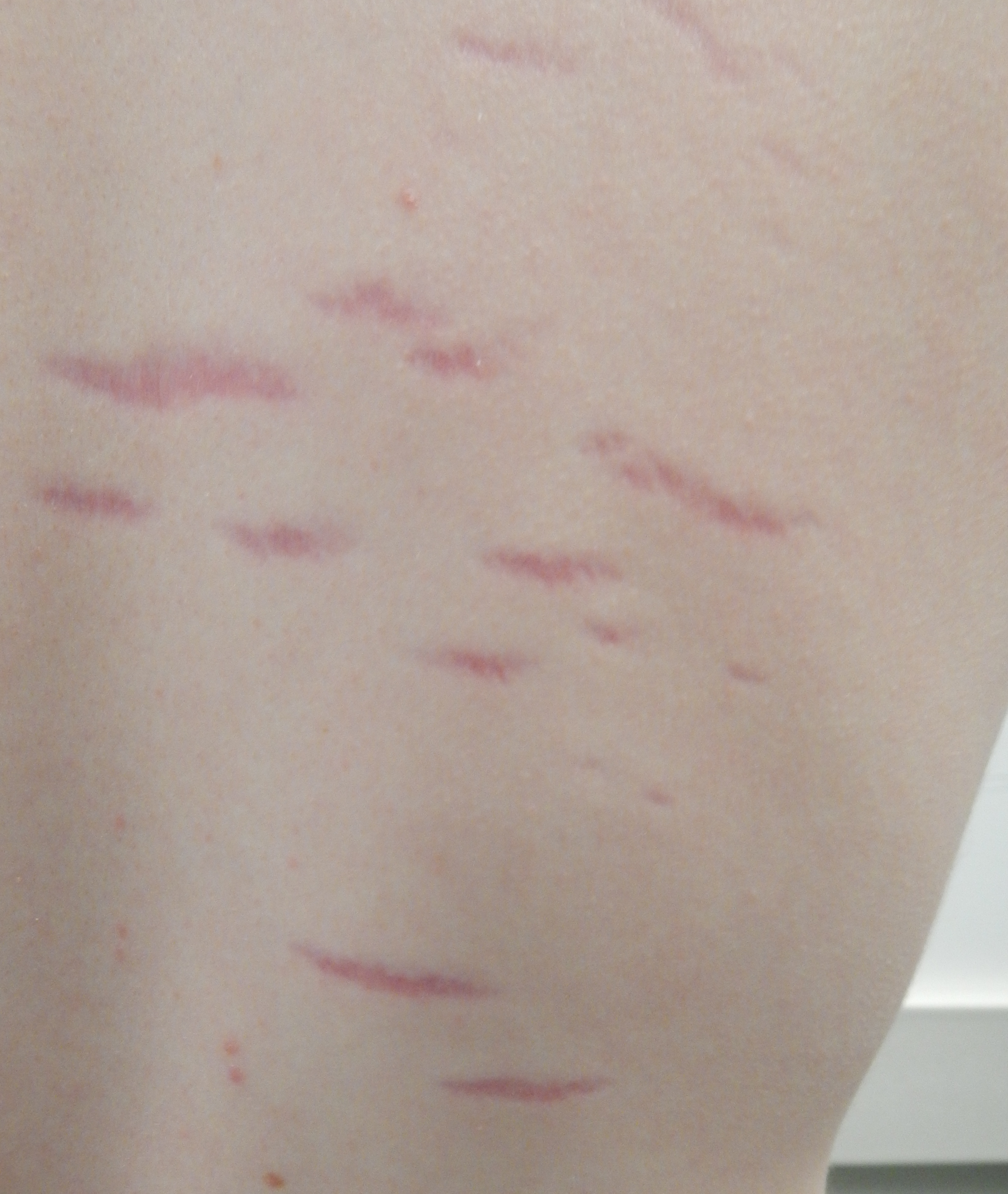
Normal stretch marks on a teenage male

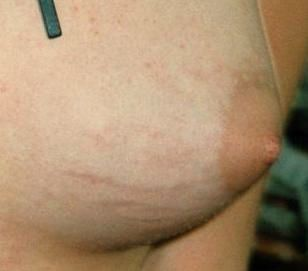
Stretch marks in a female breast

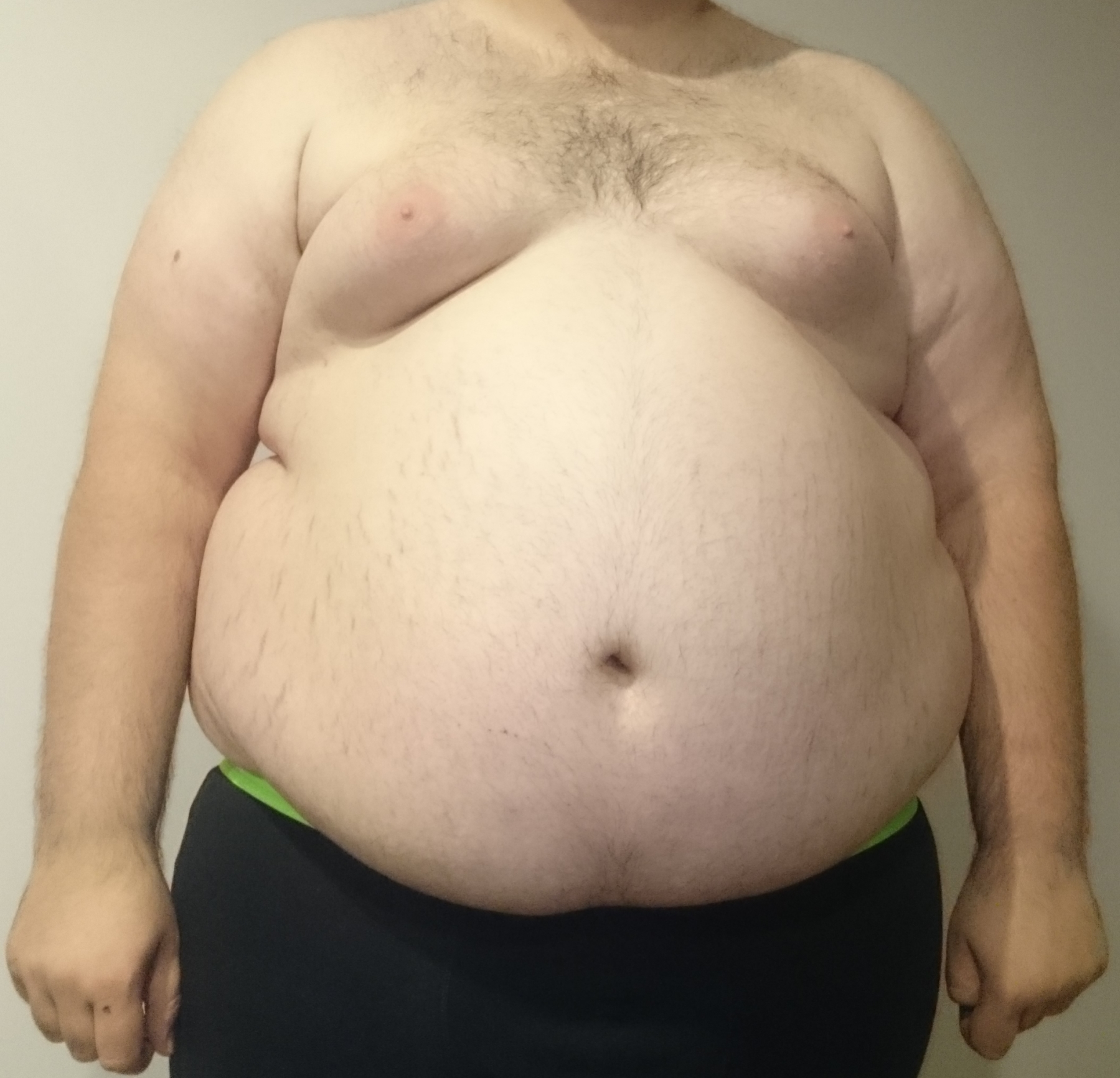
Striae distensae on an obese male
