= Radio-frequency skin tightening =

Aesthetic technique

Radio-frequency skin tightening is an aesthetic technique that uses radio frequency (RF) energy to heat skin with the purpose of stimulating cutaneous collagen, elastin and hyaluronic acid production in order to reduce the appearance of fine lines and loose skin. The technique induces tissue remodeling and production of new collagen and elastin. The process provides an alternative to facelift and other cosmetic surgeries.

By manipulating skin cooling during treatment, RF can also be used for heating and reduction of fat. Currently, the most common uses of RF-based devices are to noninvasively manage and treat skin tightening of lax skin (including sagging jowls, abdomen, thighs, and arms), as well as wrinkle reduction, cellulite improvement, and body contouring.

Several companies manufacture RF devices, including D-Finitive Thermage by Solta Medical, Evo by Beco Medical V-Form by Viora, Venus Freeze Plus, Venus Legacy by Venus Concept, VelaShape by Syneron, Exilis by BTL, and 3DEEP by Endymed. Microneedle radiofrequency is the latest form of delivery and devices include Profound by Candela lasers, Fractora, Intensif, Thermia Ablative RF Fractional by Melorin Group and Genius by Lutronic. Alternative techniques include Laser Resurfacing and certain Ultrasound alternatives. Novel non-invasive versions of radiofrequency delivery include tripolar devices such as Tripolar by Lumenis and Triactive by DEKA. Devices have different penetration depths depending on the number of electrodes (monopolar, bipolar, or unipolar).

The ideal target temperature in the dermis for inducing dermal remodeling and wrinkle and laxity reduction was shown to be 67 °C. By delivering radiofrequency power until this target temperature is attained, clinical outcomes are optimized.

Microneedle radiofrequency has also been FDA-approved for cellulite reduction using vertically penetrating needles that target the subnormal plane.

== Side effects ==
Due to radiation of high-energy radio frequency, several patients have reported pain requiring sedation during the procedure. The process also requires extreme care in its execution. Improper application may result in dents on the skin surface due to uneven healing responses on the skin. Many effects including fat necrosis and atrophic scarring have also been reported, although several new techniques have overcome this obstacle. With the application of a vacuum at the point of application, the burning and crusting was reportedly reduced.
