= Cryolipolysis =

Fat removal method using cold temperatures

Cryolipolysis (commonly referred to as "fat freezing") is a non-invasive procedure for fat removal that uses extreme cold to freeze subcutaneous adipose tissue in specific areas of the body. This process aims to reduce localized fat deposits.

Cryolipolysis is cleared by the Food and Drug Administration (FDA) for treating several areas, including the submental area, jawline, arms, lumbar rolls, flanks, abdomen, thighs, and under the buttocks.

The term "cryolipolysis" is often used interchangeably with brand names like CoolSculpting, which is one of the most well-known implementations of this technology.

== Effectiveness ==
Studies have shown that cryolipolysis is moderately effective in reducing localized fat. A 2015 systematic review of 19 studies found average reductions in skinfold thickness ranging from 10.3% to 28.5%, with high levels of patient satisfaction. A 2023 review of 18 studies reported average reductions in fat thickness of 2.0 to 5.1 mm as measured by ultrasound, concluding that the procedure is safe and modestly effective, though the quality of available data was considered low.

== Adverse effects ==
Common side effects include redness (erythema), numbness, swelling, bruising, and mild pain, typically resolving within weeks. Rare but more serious complications include paradoxical adipose hyperplasia (PAH), a reaction where fat in the treated area enlarges instead of reducing. PAH occurs in a small percentage of cases, with rates reported between 0.12% and 1.0% depending on the study. Treatment options for PAH include surgical liposuction or abdominoplasty.

== Development ==
Cryolipolysis technology was developed and introduced in the United States in 2010 by Zeltiq Aesthetics under the brand name "Coolsculpting" . It was later acquired by Allergan Aesthetics in 2017.

== See also ==
- Cryotherapy
