= Electrotherapy (cosmetic) =

Use of electrical energy for cosmetics

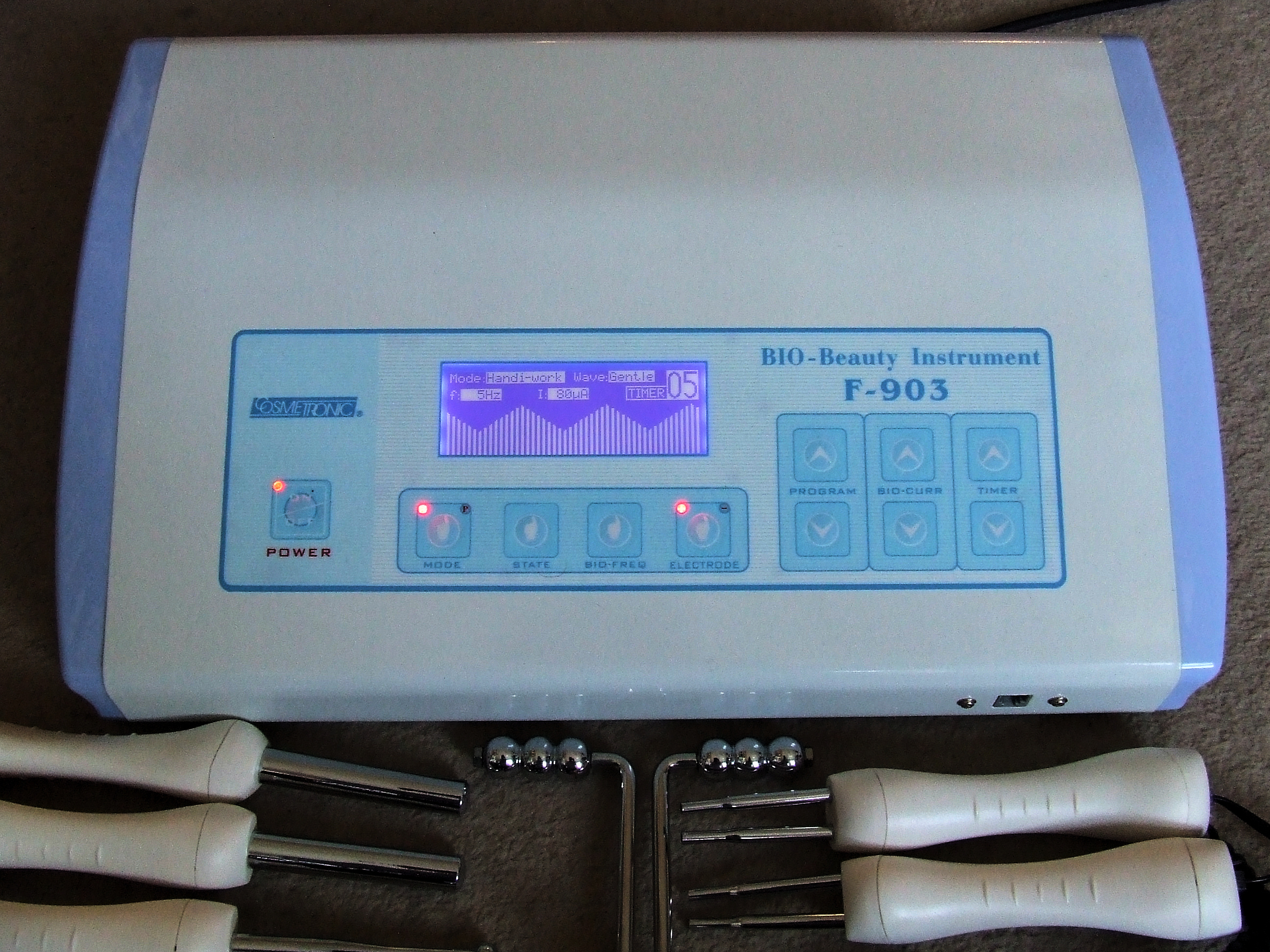
Cosmetic electrotherapy micro-current machine together with a selection of electrodes, made by Silver Fox (China)

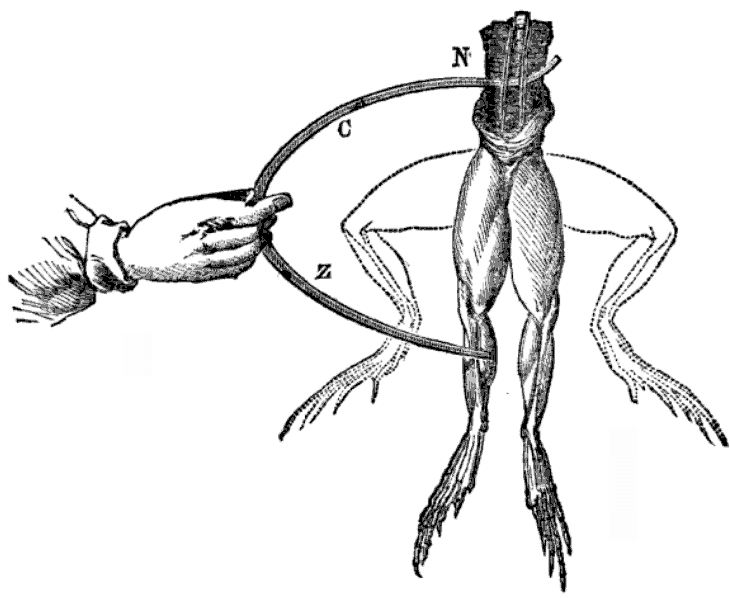
"Galvanism" Electrodes touch a frog, and the legs twitch into the upward position

Cosmetic electrotherapy is a range of beauty treatments that uses low electric currents passed through the skin to produce several therapeutic effects such as muscle toning in the body and micro-lifting of the face. In rehabilitation medicine, electrotherapy has been widely utilized and studied; however, its use on healthy muscles, particularly in cosmetic and non-clinical settings, remains controversial. Some studies have questioned its effectiveness in these contexts, citing a lack of sufficient scientific evidence to support its claimed benefits.".

The use of electricity in cosmetics goes back to the end of the 19th century, almost a hundred years after Luigi Galvani discovered that electricity can make the muscle in a frog's leg twitch (see galvanism). In the 20th century, researchers such as Robert O. Becker, Björn Nordenström, and Thomas Wingmade significant contributions to the development of microcurrent devices. Becker's work focused on bioelectric phenomena and their role in tissue regeneration; Nordenström proposed the potential therapeutic applications of endogenous electric currents in disease treatment; and Wing developed some of the earliest microcurrent stimulation devices for use in both clinical and cosmetic settings.

== Treatments ==
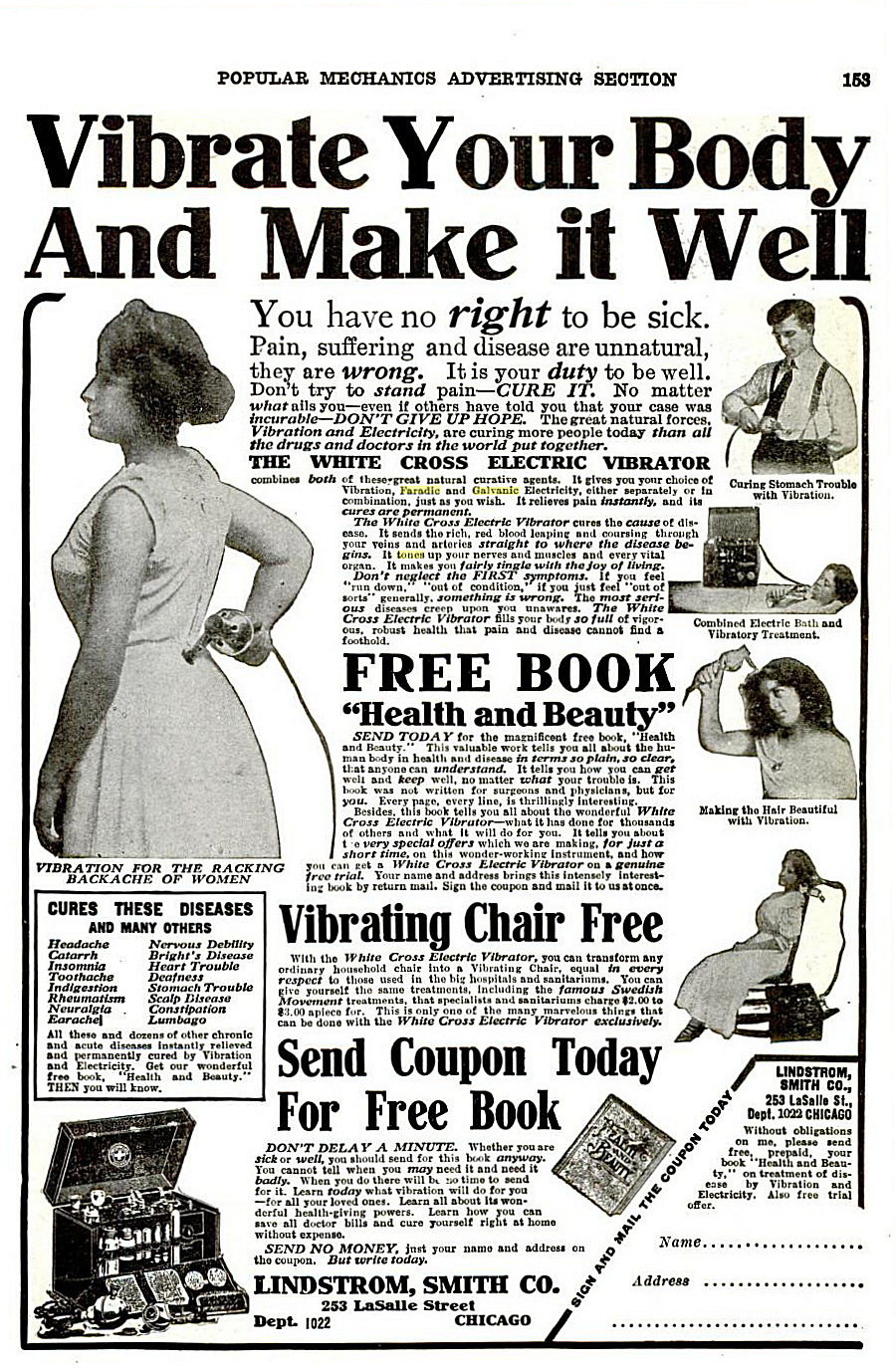
1909 cosmetic electrotherapy advert reads: The White Cross Electric Vibrator [..] gives you your choice of Vibration, Faradic and Galvanic Electricity [..] tones up your nerves and muscles"

There are four main types of treatment, that differ in the type of current they use (see Comparison table, below), including:

1. Galvanic treatment
2. Neuromuscular electrical stimulation (NMES) (also known as Faradic treatment)
3. Micro-current electrical neuromuscular stimulation (MENS)
4. High-frequency treatment

=== Galvanic treatment ===
Galvanic treatment in the beauty industry has been described since at least the 1970s and earlier. Sometimes called galvanism, the treatment aims to improve the skin in two ways: (1) cleansing: a process called desincrustation, and (2) nourishing the skin condition, through an electro-chemical process called iontophoresis (also called ionisation). It is used to improve various skin conditions, including signs of aging, hyperpigmentation, and acne. This is achieved by the application of a small, constant, direct current. The treatment works on the principle that charged ions in the skin are either attracted or repelled from the electrodes, resulting in certain chemical effects.

"Galvanism works by penetrating active substances into the subcutaneous tissues, where they act on the ineffective circulation to bring about an improvement in the vascular and lymphatic interchange in the area. This is completed in a natural and harmless way, and is aided by the actual effect of the galvanic current on the tissues. This improves the function of the cellular membrane, and allows the trapped fluid and fat to be dispersed and eliminated."

Galvanic treatment are often used on the face (facial galvanic treatment) and on the body to treat cellulite (galvanic cellulite treatments).

=== Faradic treatment ===
Faradic treatment has also been described in the beauty industry since the 1970s and earlier. The treatment tones the muscles by repeatedly contracting them with the electric current, resulting in their firming and toning, and an increase in muscular metabolism aims to remove waste products more readily. Faradic treatments are generally used on the face and body, and work by contracting muscles with a short pulse of interrupted direct current.

The treatment is also called neuromuscular electrical stimulation (NMES), and some of the manufactures who produce the equipment use their own terms, for example, Slendertone calls it electronic muscle stimulation, or the treatment is called after the name of the manufacturer, such as Ultratone or Slim Master.

=== Microcurrent treatment ===
Microcurrent treatments (MENS) have been around since the 1970s in medical applications and are distinguished by their use of micro-ampere currents (i.e. millionths of an amp) which are hardly perceptible, but mimic the body's own bio-electric currents. The treatment is designed to soften wrinkles and rejuvenate skin, including skin damaged by sunburn, acne, stretch marks, cellulite and scarring.

This increased ATP also energizes the facial muscles, similar to how exercise energizes the muscles of our bodies. Unlike anywhere else on the body, the facial muscles are directly connected to the skin, so the result of energizing the muscle is often an improved, lifted appearance. When used on the face, the treatment has become known as a "non-surgical facelift" and "facial lifting".

Microcurrent treatment works by passing a very small direct current through muscle tissue to stimulate the Golgi tendon organ. It encourages production of ATP (Adenosine triphosphate) which leads to the creation and stimulation of structural proteins like elastin and collagen.

Different microcurrent characteristics, particular the frequency and shape of the changing voltage (waveform), have different effects on the tissue.

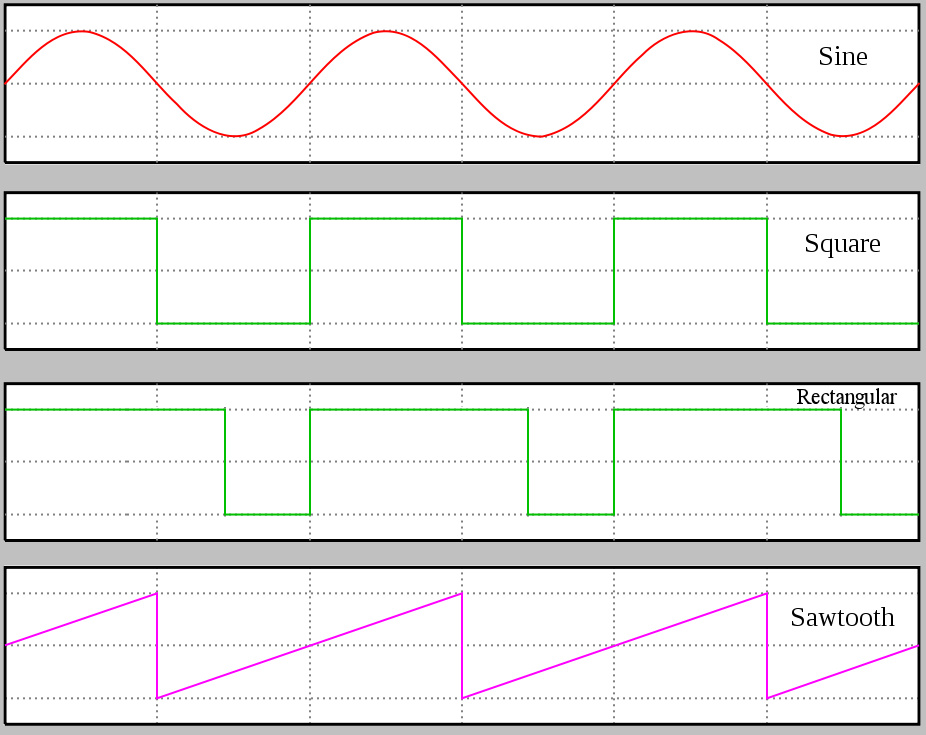
Different waveforms are used for different micro-current treatments

Frequency	Micro-current effect
600 Hz	Skin Surface
500 Hz	Skin sub-Surface
300 Hz	Lymphatic stimulation
20 Hz	Circulation
10 Hz	Facial muscles
0.8 Hz	Deep facial

Waveform shape	Micro-current effect
Sine	Superficial
Square	Pumping
Rectangular	Lifting
Sawtooth (Ramp)	Longer lifting

Microcurrent devices have been in the beauty industry for over a decade, the most known being the CACI device. Modern professional and personal use microcurrent devices combine waves of multiple shape and vary in frequencies used.

Since microcurrent treatment uses a low-grade electrical current, there has been health concerns over safety of its use. People with pacemakers or any kind of heart condition should avoid it. Moreover, pregnant women are advised against it as well. It is always recommended to individually consult with doctor or aesthetician before using microcurrent.

=== High-frequency treatment ===
High-frequency treatment uses low-current high-frequency alternating currents, delivered via a glass electrode, sometimes called a violet ray. Glass electrodes are often filled with either neon gas which produces pink, orange, or red light, or argon or rarefied gas which produces violet light. Because of the color of light that is produced when electricity is passed through the gas, they are inaccurately called ultraviolet or infrared, however no UV rays or infrared rays are produced, just visible light. High frequency current does convert some of the oxygen in the air surrounding the electrodes into ozone, the treatment has a germicidal action, and is also drying and warming. Consequently, the treatment is used to aid healing and also to help desquamation (the skin's natural exfoliation) and stimulate sweat and sebaceous glands. Sparking may occur when the electrode is close to the skin and then pulled away repeatedly. Some electrodes may contain a metal coil that produces a mechanical vibration, as well as sparking energy that can be felt indirectly when held in one person's hand while another person uses their hands directly on the skin. Because the effect may be pleasurable, similar devices are used in erotic electrostimulation.

== Treatment and current ==
The characteristics of the treatment current include: (a) whether it is (direct or alternating), (b) current frequency, (c) size of the current (all very small), and (d) the duration and shape of any pulses.

=== Comparison ===
Treatment	Current type	Current range	Frequency	Therapies
Galvanic (galvanism)	Direct and constant	milliAmps (mA)	None (constant)	Desincrustation. Iontophoresis
Faradic Also known as Neuromuscular electrical stimulation (NMES), Faradism, Excitomotor current (USA), Electrical Muscle Stimulation (EMS)	Alternating current used where current flows in both direction	Up to 80 mA	50–100 Hz	Muscle toning
Micro-current Electrical Neuromuscular Stimulation (MENS) Also known as Micro-electrotherapy	Direct (pulsed)	300–500μA (microAmps)	0.1–680 Hz	Skin-toning; Softens fine lines Facial micro-lifting.
High-frequency	Alternating	Low	100,000–250,000 Hz (100 kHz–250 kHz)	Conditions the skin. Promotes healing. Antibacterial.

Notes

- Desincrustation – A skin cleansing process that softens and emulsifies hardened follicle sebum.
- 1 Amp = 1,000 milliAmps (mA) = 1,000,000 microAmps (μA)
- 1,000 Hz (cycles per second) = 1 kHz

== Terminology ==
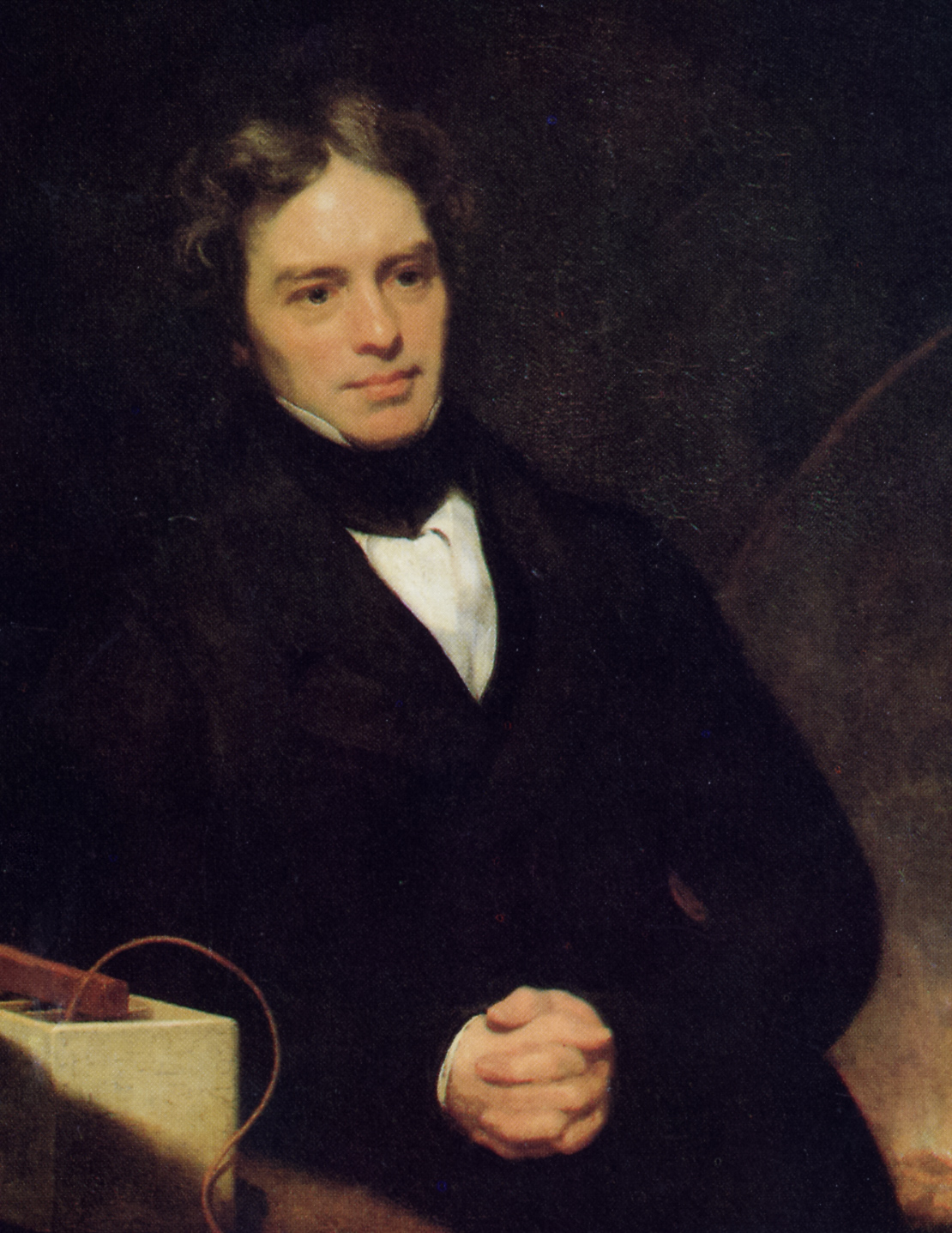
Michael Faraday (1791–1867) lends his name to the term "Faradic"

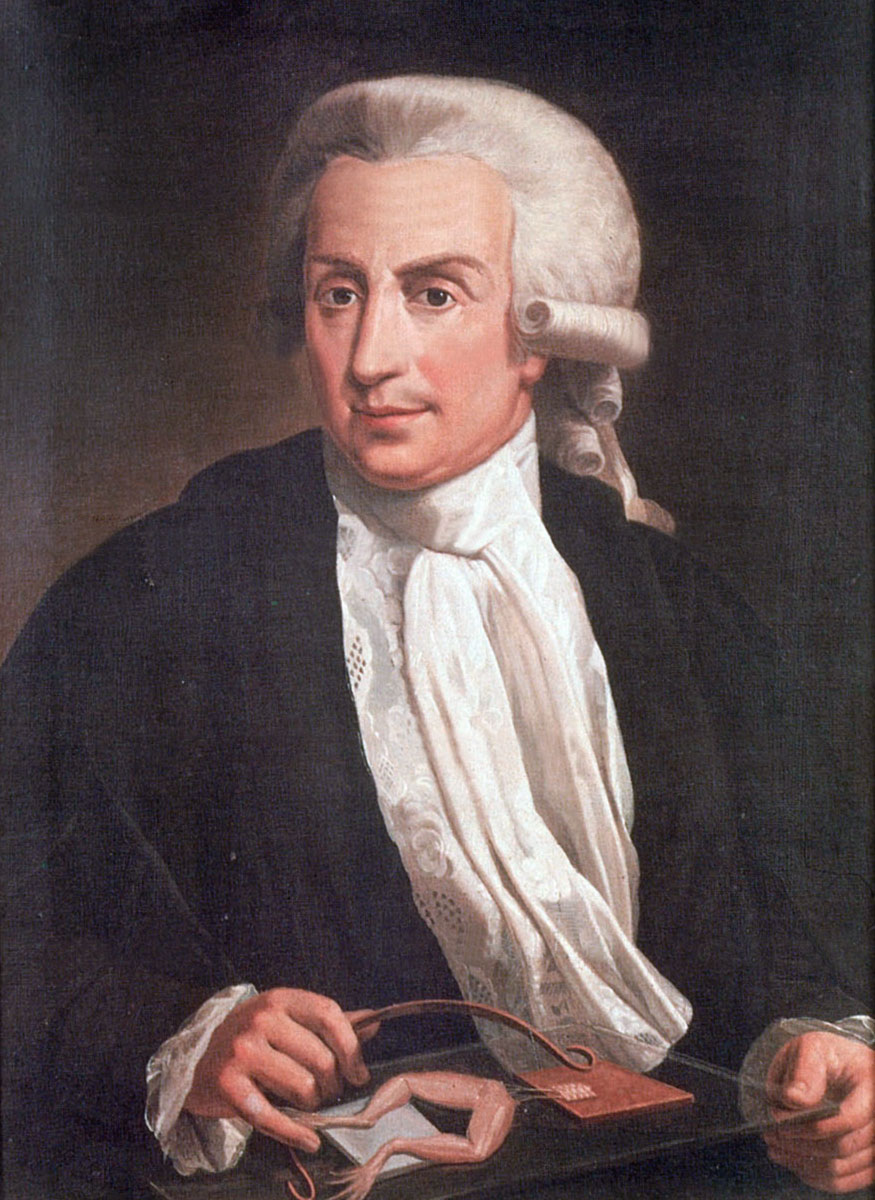
Luigi Galvani (1737–1798) lends his name to the term "galvanic"

The origins of the terms "galvanic" and "Faradism" are described in the medical journal, The Lancet, in 1851. A note reads:

"We should not omit to state that Dr Duchenne closes a paper (Archives, May 1851) on the subject by these words: 'As it will be useful to create a word which should exactly point out electricity by induction, as well as its application, may it not be allowable to use the name of the philosopher who has discovered this kind of electricity? Thus, in the same way as 'Galvani' has given his name to the electricity by contact, so can we like-wise give to the electricity by induction the name of 'Faraday.' This electricity would then be called 'Faradism,' and its application 'Faradization.' Such names would establish a clear distinction between the electricity by contact and that by induction, while they, at the same time, render due honour to a philosopher to whom medical science owes a discovery far more valuable in a therapeutic point of view than that of Galvani.'"

It is noted that:

"Some terms such as galvanic current and faradic stimulation are unique to physiotherapy. Their definitions given in the literature are far from universal. ... The Clinical Electrophysiology Section of the American Physical Therapy Association established a unified terminology for clinical electrical currents—that is, (a) direct current (b) alternating current (c) pulsed current (Kloth and Cummings, 1991) ... However, this terminology does not appear to have been widely adopted and inconsistencies remain in the literature".

== See also ==
- Bio-electric stimulation therapy (BEST)
- Electrotherapy – the use of electricity as a medical treatment
- Electrical muscle stimulation (neuromuscular electrical stimulation (NMES))
- Erotic electrostimulation
- Microcurrent electrical neuromuscular stimulator (MENS)
- Transcutaneous electrical nerve stimulation (TENS) – the use of electric current to stimulate the nerves for therapeutic purposes

== Bibliography ==
- Lorraine Nordmann, Professional Beauty Therapy: The Official Guide to Level 3, 4th Edition, Publisher Cengage Learning EMEA, 2010, ISBN 1-4080-1928-0 ISBN 9781408019283, 496 pages. Chapter 8: "Electrical treatments"
- Dawn Mernagh-Ward, Jennifer Cartwright, Health and beauty therapy: a practical approach for NVQ level 3 Edition 3, Publisher Nelson Thornes, 2004, ISBN 0-7487-9035-7, ISBN 978-0-7487-9035-7, 420 pages. Chapter 5. "Facial and Body Electrotherapy Treatments"
- John Low, Ann Reed, Ann Reed (SRP.), Electrotherapy explained: principles and practice, 4th Edition, Publisher Elsevier Health Sciences, 2000, ISBN 978-0-7506-8843-7. 564 pages.
- Basanta Kumar Nanda, Electrotherapy Simplified, Publisher Jaypee Brothers Publishers (2008), ISBN 81-8448-261-2, ISBN 978-81-8448-261-4. 548 pages
