= V-EMF therapy =

Regenerative therapy based on electrostimulation

V-EMF therapy is a therapy that is based on the synergy between electromagnetic fields, vacuum and low-intensity electrostimulation. It is also known as Biodermogenesi. The electromagnetic field is generated with a variable frequency between 0.5 and 2 MHz.

Electromagnetic fields are able to promote the repair processes of skin lesions with a reduction in healing time and scar size and with an increase in the re-epithelialization process. They also promote the migration and subsequent stabilization of different cell types involved in the processes of regeneration, tissue engineering and wound care.

The data in the literature show that the therapeutic application of electromagnetic fields allows to obtain satisfactory results in the regeneration of degenerated or traumatized or injured tissue reaching the healing and regeneration of permanent lesions. In addition, they have been shown to be useful in reducing fibrosis both in the treatment of cellulite and in the treatment of fibrotic, hypertrophic and keloid scars.

Similarly to electromagnetic fields, the application of vacuum, in this therapy adopted with negative pressure between 8 and 16 hundredths of Bar, has shown considerable effectiveness in reducing skin fibrosis due to cellulite and scarring.

As for low-intensity electrostimulation, or electroporation, delivered at 5 VDC, it is able to increase skin nourishment. The three forms of energy used simultaneously are the basis of V-EMF therapy, which has shown significant results in various fields of application. The therapeutic protocol has proven effective in the treatment of burn scars, post-surgical trauma, chemical burns, stretch marks, and in anti-aging therapy.

== See also ==
- Biodermogenesi
