= Ionithermie =

Pseudoscientific detoxification

Ionithermie is a cosmetology treatment performed in spas, intended to remove cellulite using electrical muscle stimulation combined with a lotion made of algae, seaweed extracts and amino acids. The lotion is mixed with clay, and electrodes are placed on the clay to enact iontophoresis. The specific materials vary from treatment provider, such as including guarana extract, and the results are generally small. It uses direct current and is similar to another cellulite electrotherapy treatment called galvanization.

Ionthermie was invented by French biochemist Olivier Fouche in 1978, although a separate source claims it was invented in 1979.

While it has been described as pseudoscientific, one study in 2006 reported modest results.
