= Physical therapy for stroke rehabilitation =

Field of Physical Therapy

Physical therapists work with large numbers of stroke victims in various settings (inpatient/outpatient rehabilitation, acute care hospitals, subacute care hospitals, skilled nursing facilities, home healthcare, hospital and private outpatient clinics) to improve their functional recovery and quality of life. Stroke is the most significant cause of serious, long-term disability in the United States. The time it takes to recover from a stroke depends on the extent of damage to the brain. More than half of stroke survivors regain their functional independence, while 15% to 30% are permanently disabled, and 20% still require in-patient care three months after the stroke. Following a stroke, the patient's degree of disability is largely determined by their available mobility. Lack of efficient residual muscle function following a stroke limits endurance in most stroke survivors.

== History ==
=== Physical Therapy ===
Physical therapy is a health care profession that provides services to clients, helping them maintain, develop, and restore maximum movement and functional ability throughout the lifespan. These services are provided in situations where movement and function are endangered by ageing, injury, disease or environmental factors.

Physical Therapists (PTs) are trained to diagnose and treat physical conditions which impact quality of life and movement potential of individuals. Physical Therapy practice includes the spheres of health promotion, disease prevention, treatment/intervention, habilitation, and rehabilitation.

Physical therapy is designed to help recover functionality, reduce the chances of having another stroke, and improve daily living. One important focus in rehabilitation is aerobic training, as the cardiorespiratory fitness of most stroke survivors is extremely low at the beginning of rehabilitation.

=== Stroke ===
Stroke is a clinical event caused by an acute interruption of blood flow to a part of the brain or spinal cord. Stroke results from the lack of oxygen that occurs when an artery to the brain becomes blocked by a clot (cerebral infarction) or bursts (cerebral hemorrhage). Stroke is the third leading cause of death in the United States, trailing only heart disease and cancer.

=== Neuroplasticity ===
Neuroplasticity is the capability of parts of the central nervous system (CNS) to change their structure and function in response to conditions and events. This adaptability of the CNS to change allows the nervous system to reorganize and relearn in response to environmental stimulation thus contributing to recovery from various brain and spinal cord injuries.

Changes within the brain both structurally and functionally can be detected by transcranial magnetic stimulation(TMS), magnetic resonance imaging, and positron emission tomography. Clinical trials have shown neuroplasticity through constraint-induced movement therapy used with patients having hemiparesis after stroke.

== Interventions ==
For many stroke victims, motor learning, which contributes to patients' acquisition of motor skills, is a vital part of the physical therapy treatments utilized in rehabilitation protocols. Physical therapy interventions used in patient care range from the conventional interventions such as the Bobath, Brunnstrom, and proprioceptive neuromuscular facilitation (PNF) to more recent therapies like promotion of specific/functional/repetitive tasks, constraint-induced movement therapy, electrical stimulation, and different types of gait training. All of the interventions listed below have been researched and described in the physical therapy literature. Additionally, stroke patients should incorporate a scheduled aerobic exercise at an appropriate intensity. Treadmill or cycling can be used jointly with task-focused walking, task-oriented practice balance exercise, aquatic therapy, and strength training to develop fitness and function simultaneously.

=== Conventional interventions ===
The rehabilitation techniques of Bobath and Brunnstrom, as well as proprioceptive neuromuscular facilitation (PNF) focus primarily on retraining motor control by facilitating the desired movement patterns or inhibiting less-desired ones. When comparing the more conventional neurofacilitation approaches with recent interventions for stroke, no significant improvement in walking or activities of daily living have been seen with the more conventional approaches.

==== Bobath ====
The Bobath technique is partially founded on the thought that a normal reflex mechanism is the basis for normal movement patterns. After stroke, patients with hemiplegia are limited in their movement patterns and tend to exhibit more flexor and/or extensor synergies. The Bobath approach is used as an intervention for patients with hemiparesis, but there is insufficient evidence for its impact on gait.

==== Brunnstrom ====
To regain global synergistic movements and muscle tone the Brunnstrom approach utilizes coupled reactions, primitive postural reactions, and resistance. There is insufficient evidence to support the use of the Brunnstrom approach with gait training after stroke.

==== Proprioceptive neuromuscular facilitation (PNF) ====
PNF is used to facilitate movement via the use of resistance. Resistance is limited to an amount that does not allow abnormal movement patterns.

=== Recent interventions ===
==== Task oriented learning ====
Task oriented training focuses on skill acquisition through the motor learning of functional tasks. Practice of these skilled motor learning tasks is the key to cortical reorganization. Principles of task oriented training include specificity of training, constrained use of the impaired limb, mass practice, shaping of skill, saliency of task, and knowledge of performance and results. Recent evidence suggests that exercise-based rehabilitation approaches, including aerobic training, resistance exercise, and task-oriented therapy, play a critical role in improving functional outcomes after stroke. A systematic review found that combined rehabilitation programs (e.g., integrating strength, aerobic, and functional training) are more effective than single-modality interventions for improving gait, upper extremity function, and activities of daily living. Additionally, early initiation of active rehabilitation is associated with better recovery outcomes compared to prolonged rest.

===== Specific/functional/repetitive tasks =====
Repetitive task training for improving functional ability after stroke was analyzed in a Cochrane Review. The authors/reviewers focused on task specificity more than repetition. They looked at 14 studies and found that even though improvements in walking distance, walking speed, and sit to stand ability were demonstrated with practiced functional activities, six months later improvements failed to be maintained. Small improvements were shown with acts of daily living and no impact was seen with arm/hand function with repetitive practice of tasks. The duration of time after stroke had no impact on training outcomes.

Circuit class therapy (CCT) is another intervention using repetitive task training with functional tasks. A Cochrane review of studies of the effects of circuit class therapy on the improvement of mobility after stroke revealed that people with moderate stroke impairments may show improved mobility with this safe intervention. CCT may also decrease the number of days needed for inpatient care.

===== Constraint induced movement therapy (CIMT) =====
Constraint induced movement therapy is utilized in patients with stroke as an intervention within rehabilitation settings. It is used to decrease learned non use of the affected limb and force the use of that limb while restraining the unaffected limb. Repetitive, functional tasks are performed to increase motor learning, motor skill, and function in the affected limb.

A study was conducted to look at feasibility and compare efficacy of a modified CIT protocol, traditional OT/PT, and no therapy at all for improving upper-limb outcomes for patients with subacute CVAs (cerebrovascular accident). Groups receiving no therapy and traditional therapy did not show improvements, but for patients instructed with modified CIT, improvements were seen in fine motor skills, outcome measures, and quality and amount of limb use. The evidence suggests effectiveness for using modified CIT with distributed practice and repeated use to increase functional use and decrease impairments. This study further supports various practice schedules as a tool to be used for motor learning development.

Tarka and Kononen, 2009, have reported that "CIMT provides increasingly difficult motor challenge with a motor learning component, and thus provides activations in the brain that may enhance reorganization related to motor control." They conclude that CIMT when used on subjects with mild or moderate upper limb paresis is an effective technique to be used.

The EXCITE (Extremity Constraint Induced Therapy Evaluation) randomized clinical trial researched the effects of CIMT on upper extremity function in adults who had experienced a stroke in the previous 6–9 months. The results of this study demonstrated that CIMT produced significant clinical improvement in arm movement lasting at least 1 year.

===== Activities of daily living (ADLs) =====
Activities of daily living include everyday activities necessary for daily living and self-care. These include bathing, grooming, toileting, feeding, transfers (i.e. sit to stand, sit to lying), bed mobility, dressing, and locomotion/gait (walking).

Neuroprosthetics is an intervention found to improve ADLs. In a 2005 randomized control trial, it was concluded that regardless of length of time after stroke, patients with hemiplegia and severe arm paralysis improved in functions of reaching and grasping with the application of FES technology via a neuroprosthesis. The main component contributing to success with this type of intervention was intense repetitive treatment specific to a patient's individual daily needs and could be changed as the patient's affected limb improved functionally.

===== Electromyography biofeedback (EMG-BFB) =====
Electromyography (EMG) biofeedback for the recovery of motor function after stroke was reviewed by Woodford and Price, 2007 in a Cochrane Review. The authors found that by using this intervention, patients may be able to utilize unimpaired pathways. This may enable the patient to have more muscular control by helping with functional recovery after stroke. The efficacy of this technique is inconclusive. No positive benefit for post stroke recovery has been shown via the evidential data. EMG-BFB should not be used routinely for treatment.

===== Robotics/neuromuscular electrical stimulation (NMES) =====
Robotic interventions such as the InMotion2 robot, Mirror Image Movement Enabler, and Training-Wilmington Robotic Exoskeleton have been used as part of post-stroke rehabilitation interventions. The MIT-Manus (InMotion2 robot) has aided arm movement and strength improvement in patients after stroke. When the hemiparetic forearm/hand is attached to the robot's arm, the robot can then facilitate exercises with movement of the shoulder and elbow in a horizontal plane. Using an interactive computer screen the patient's exercises involve reaching for targets. A Mirror Image Movement Enabler was found to effectively increase free arm movements through resisted and assisted multiple plane arm motions better than conventional therapy. T-WREX (Training-Wilmington Robotic Exoskeleton) incorporates virtual reality with arm training for patients with hemiparetic upper limbs. It utilizes an exoskeletal arm that is adjustable and offsets the weight of the hemiparetic arm with elastic bands. While a patient performs arm movements with the exoskeletal arm there is a virtual hand on the computer screen carrying out tasks that correspond to the arm motion. Some efficacy has been demonstrated with the T-WREX.

Short term efficacy during the acute phase of stroke recovery and for those with minimal wrist and finger movement has been shown with NMES. The evidence is insufficient to support the enhancement of post stroke functional arm use with NMES.

==== Gait ====
Neurological changes in the brain due to stroke affect a patient's gait cycle. Patients often have gait impairments consisting of a slower cadence, smaller step length, decreased gait symmetry, decreased gait sequence, muscle weakness, and decreased muscle activation.

Gait restoration is an importantly emphasized rehabilitation goal following a stroke. One of the best ways to achieve this goal is to walk. Gait speed over 10m and the distance walked in six minutes are the two clinical measures most used to assess gait ability. An approximate 6m/min increase for gait speed and 50m increase with the 6-minute walk test are seen as indications of considerable improvement in walking ability.

Patients who have had a stroke have an increased energy demand 1.5 to 2 times greater than healthy people for ambulation. According to Jorgensen et al., 2010, "people with stroke in the chronic stage can achieve clinically relevant improvements in gait performance and cardiovascular health parameters through high intensity physical training consisting of a combination of BWSTT, PRST (passive resistive strength training), AE (aerobic exercise), and functional training."

===== Body weight supported treadmill training (BWSTT) =====
Body weight supported treadmill training (BWSTT) is used as a post stroke intervention to support task-specific gait training. Numerous studies have been conducted using BWSTT. Evidence from some of this literature is summarized below.

After stroke, patients can practice walking during rehabilitation with the aid of parallel bars, assistive devices, manual assistance, or with body weight-supported treadmill training (BWSTT). BWSTT incorporates repetitive motion of the lower limbs through the gait cycle which may be one reason why it has been shown to be effective for patients with stroke. Patients may also ambulate or be more apt to move with a more positive perception of safety because they are secured in a harness and their body weight is partially unloaded. A recent Cochrane review and other studies have shown no differences in the effectiveness of BWSTT when compared with traditional gait strategies.

In one study, it was found that BWSTT beginning with 40% body-weight support and gradually weaned over training sessions was more effective for walking after stroke when compared to traditional treadmill training. Sullivan et al., 2007, reported in a randomized control trial that "task-specific training using TM walking with BWS was more effective in increasing walking speed than a less task-specific resisted cycling training program in individuals with chronic stroke who have limited community ambulation ability." BWSTT related increases of immediate and long term walking capacity have been shown to transfer to over-ground walking.

Along with improved gait, positive effects have been demonstrated in balance, balance confidence, and health-related quality of life in persons with chronic stroke after body weight-supported treadmill training. On the other hand, for most patients with chronic stroke the positive effects on balance and balance confidence were not outside the range of measurement error and perceptions of improved quality of life were not maintained long term.

The physical requirements of BWSTT and time demands on PTs have limited its use in the clinic. Therefore, robotic devices for stepping assistance have been developed to aid with gait training.

===== Overground gait training =====
A Cochrane review by States et al., 2009, examined randomized control trials evaluating over-ground gait training with a control (rehab interventions other than gait) or no intervention. This review found insufficient evidence to determine whether over-ground gait training directly benefits broad measures of gait function, but with explicit training protocols more specific measures of gait showed limited benefits right after over-ground gait training.

Over-ground gait training to improve insufficient mobility in patients with chronic stroke is not supported by research-based evidence. There is also insufficient evidence to support over-ground gait training as an intervention that independently could cause a significant effect on the broader aspects of gait function in patients with chronic stroke.

Most current Interventions

A systematic review investigated a wide variety of physical therapy programs aimed at enhancing cardiovascular fitness following post-stroke at 6 months. A large number of clinical trials were incorporated by the authors, in which therapists applied walking, cycling, task-oriented practice, resistance work, and aquatic treatment. These findings support making aerobic capacity a standard treatment goal in stroke rehabilitation programs, alongside motor recovery and independence in daily living. It is safe to say that with the aid of improved methodology, artificial technology, or any other ergogenic aid within the realm of physical therapy for post-stroke patients, early intervention with safe initiation of aerobic exercise is beneficial. Furthermore, patients who are post-stroke after 6 months are able to incrementally increase intensity when exercising for improving long-term health and autonomy.
