= Destination spa =

Resort centered on a spa

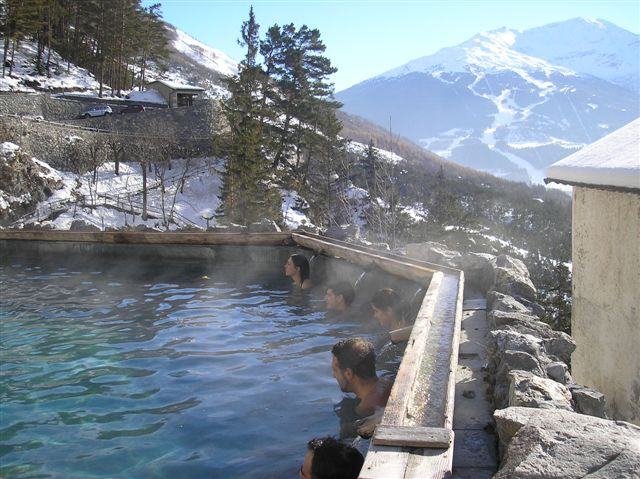
Destination spa in Bormio, Italy

A destination spa or health resort is a resort centered on a spa, such as a mineral spa. Historically, many such spas were developed at the location of natural hot springs or mineral springs. In the era before modern biochemistry and pharmacotherapy, "taking the waters" was often believed to have great medicinal powers. Even without such mystic powers, the stress relief and health education of spas also often has some degree of positive effect on health. Destination spas offer day spa facilities, but what sets them apart is that they also offer hotel facilities so that people can stay multiple nights.

Typically, over a seven-day stay, they provide a comprehensive program that includes spa services, physical fitness activities, wellness education, healthy cuisine, and special interest programming.

A special subgroup are the medical spas who offer treatments that are paid back by the national health insurance program.

== All-inclusive program ==
Some destination spas offer an all-inclusive program that includes facilitated fitness classes, healthy cuisine, educational classes and seminars, as well as similar to a beauty salon or a day spa. Guests reside and participate in the program at a destination spa instead of just visiting for a treatment or pure vacation. Some destination spas are in tropical locations or in spa towns.

Destination spas have been in use for a considerable time, and some are no longer used but are rather preserved as elements of earlier history; for example, Gilroy Yamato Hot Springs in California is such a historically used spa whose peak patronage occurred in the late 19th and early 20th century.

Resort spas are generally located in resorts, and offer similar services via rooms with services, meals, body treatments, and fitness a la carte.

== Types of medical services ==
Typical medical services offered at destination spas include:

- Balneotherapy
- Electrology
- Facial
- Physical fitness
- Ionithermie
- Massage
- Manicure
- Pedicure

== Medical spas ==
Medical spas provide treatments and revalidation therapies paid back by the national health insurance, have to comply to the ISO 21426:2018 standard on tourism and related service requirements for medical spas and have a medical doctor on site who supervises all the treatments.

The European Spas Association represents medical spas, health resorts, and regional spa associations in 19 European countries.

It is common for elderly people to take every year a one-week treatment in medical public spas, which offer treatments for patients with syndrome diseases such as fibromyalgia, multiple sclerosis, rheumatism, and arthritis.

Treatment is also offered in Ministry of Ayush hospital revalidation centers, in the Middle Eastern Hammam steam bath facilities, as well as Asian or "Traditional Chinese Hot Spring" centers, and Japanese shinrin-yoku centres.
