= Faradic battery =

Electrical device that sent therapeutic shocks

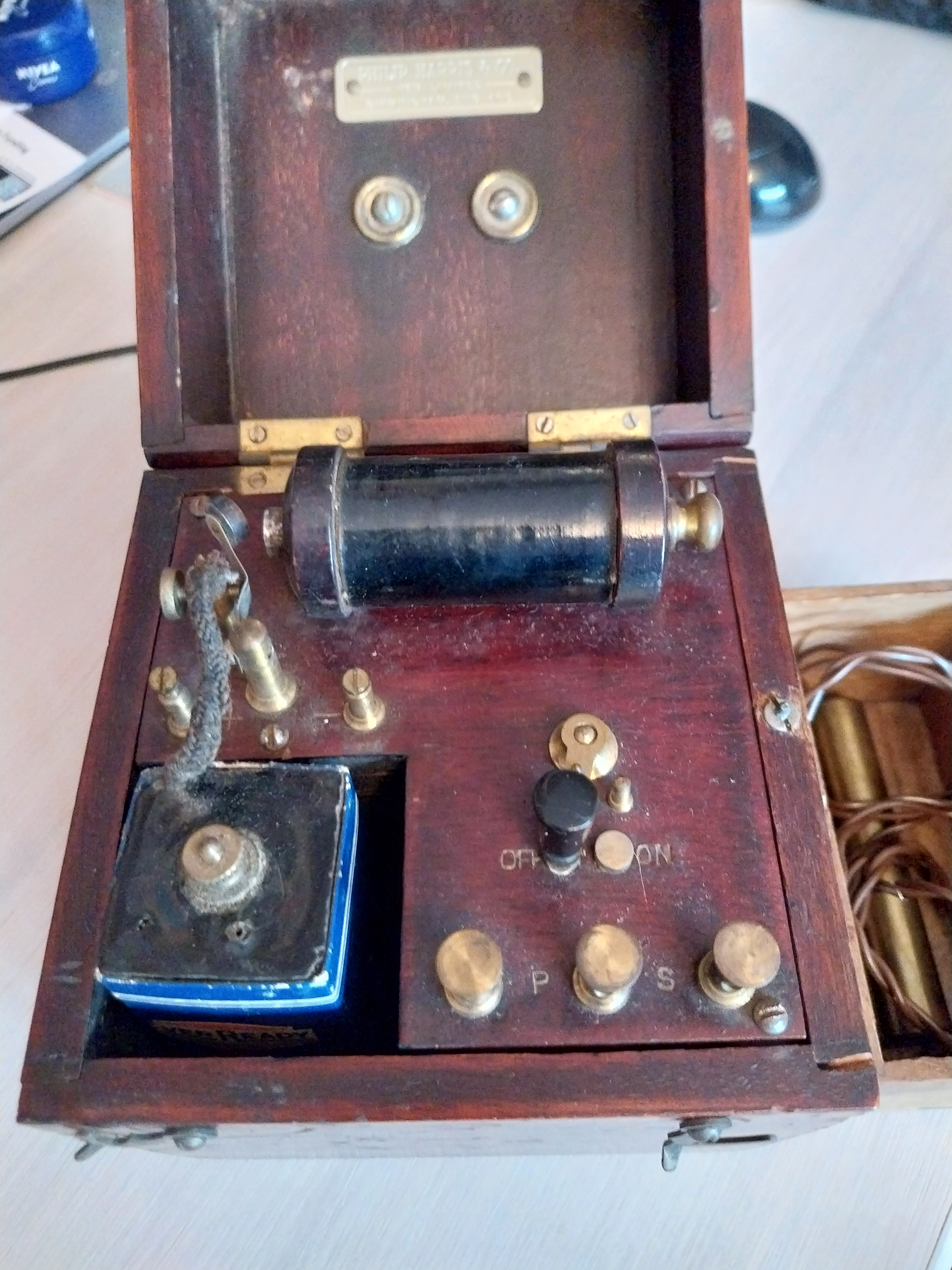
A portable Faradic battery by Philip Harris & Co. from 1913

A Faradic battery (or Faradic stimulator, or galvanic battery) was a device used in 19th and early 20th century medicine. The name of the device is associated both with Michael Faraday and Luigi Galvani. It was designed to create a mild electric shock that was thought to be therapeutic, to assist with ailments around nerve sensitivity within muscles and bones. Many machines were portable for use at a doctor's office or at home. Allegedly of little actual benefit and providing more of a placebo effect.

== See also ==
- Electrotherapy
- Electroconvulsive therapy
