= Cellulite =

- Other names: Adiposis edematosa, dermopanniculosis deformans, status protrusus cutis, gynoid lipodystrophy, orange peel syndrome
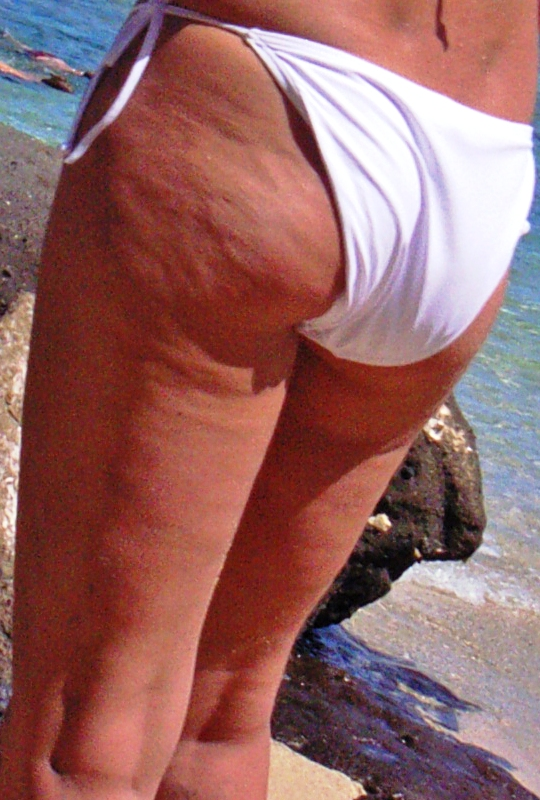
- The dimpled appearance of cellulite
- Specialty: Plastic surgery

Cellulite (/ˈsɛljəlaɪt/) or gynoid lipodystrophy (GLD) is the herniation of subcutaneous fat within fibrous connective tissue that manifests as skin dimpling and nodularity, often on the pelvic region (specifically the buttocks), lower limbs, and abdomen. Cellulite occurs in most postpubescent females. A review gives a prevalence of 85–98% of women of European descent, but it is considerably less common in women of East Asian descent. It is believed to be physiological rather than pathological. It can result from a complex combination of factors, including diet, sedentary lifestyle, hormonal balance, or heredity, among others. It is not specific to females, but it is more common in females than in males.

== Causes ==
The causes of cellulite include changes in metabolism, physiology, diet and exercise habits, obesity, alteration of connective tissue structure, hormonal factors, genetic factors, the microcirculatory system, the extracellular matrix, and subtle inflammatory alterations.

=== Hormonal factors ===
Hormones play a dominant role in the formation of cellulite. Estrogen is thought to be an important hormone in the development of cellulite, and it has been proposed that an imbalance of estrogen relative to progesterone may be associated with cellulite. However, there has been no reliable clinical evidence to support the claim that estrogen levels are linked to cellulite, and many women with elevated estrogen levels do not get cellulite. Other hormones—including insulin, the catecholamines adrenaline, cortisol and noradrenaline, thyroid hormones, and prolactin—are believed to participate in the development of cellulite.

=== Genetic factors ===
There is a genetic element in individual susceptibility to cellulite. Researchers have traced the genetic component of cellulite to particular polymorphisms in the angiotensin converting enzyme (ACE) and hypoxia-inducible factor 1A (HIF1a) genes. Evidence for the heredity of cellulite is supported by studies showing that both the presence and degree of cellulite is similar between females within the same family.

=== Predisposing factors ===
Several factors have been shown to affect the development of cellulite. Sex, ethnicity, biotype, distribution of subcutaneous fat, and predisposition to lymphatic and circulatory insufficiency have all been shown to contribute to cellulite. It is considerably less common in women of East Asian descent than in white women.

=== Lifestyle ===
A high-stress lifestyle causes an increase in the level of catecholamines, which have also been associated with the development of cellulite. Inactivity can cause vascular stasis, forming cellulite. Excessive carbohydrate consumption may also be related to cellulite in some instances.

== Treatments ==
Cellulite can be resistant to a variety of treatments. Aside from "topical" products (creams, ointments) and injectables (collagenase), treatments for cellulite include non-invasive therapy such as mechanical suction or mechanical massage. Energy-based devices include radio frequency with deep penetration of the skin, ultrasound, cryotherapy chambers, laser and pulsed-light devices. Combinations of mechanical treatments and energy-based procedures are widely used. Ionithermie, a form of electrotherapy using electrical muscle stimulation, has been described as ineffective. More invasive 'subcision' techniques utilize a needle-sized microscalpel to cut through the causative fibrous bands of connective tissue. Subcision procedures (manual, vacuum-assisted, or laser-assisted) are performed in specialist clinics with patients given local anaesthetic.

== Epidemiology ==
In European populations, cellulite is thought to occur in 80–90% of post-adolescent females. Its existence as a real disorder has been challenged, and the prevailing medical opinion is that it is merely the "normal condition of many women". It is rarely seen in males.

== History ==
The growing interest in cellulite has historically been linked to the growth of the cosmetic industry in the West, as well as globalization. The term was first used in the 1920s by spa and beauty services to promote their services, and began appearing in English-language publications in the late 1960s, with the earliest reference in Vogue magazine, "Like a swift migrating fish, the word cellulite has suddenly crossed the Atlantic." According to Italian researcher Martina Grimaldi, cellulite has often been pathologized as a "disease" in Western European news media, and it has been shown that French magazines promoting this misinformation are often funded by pharmaceutical companies that manufacture anti-cellulite skincare products. American journalist Susan Faludi notes that the Western beauty advertisements have attempted to portray cellulite as a symptom of women's social progress, that cellulite is caused by being a working, independent woman. Faludi writes that such messaging is motivated by a fear within the cosmetic industry that women's social progress might lead to declining profits in the beauty industry as a whole, noting that profits did decline in the 1970s and 1980s, the era of second-wave feminism.
