= Biodermogenesi =

Biodermogenesi is a procedure adopted in dermatology to promote skin regeneration. The system makes it possible to reorganize the skin layers and stimulate the regeneration of collagen, elastic fibers and basal cells through the reactivation of intra- and extracellular exchange. The therapy is based on the combined delivery of electromagnetic fields, vacuum and electrostimulation (V-EMF therapy). The literature shows that it is generally pleasant and relaxing for patients and has been found to be effective in the anti-aging therapy, of stretch marks and scars, always in the absence of side effects.

== See also ==
- V-EMF therapy
