= C. Norman Shealy =

American neurosurgeon and inventor (1932–2024)

Clyde Norman Shealy (December 4, 1932 – July 8, 2024) was an American neurosurgeon.

== Early life and education ==
Shealy was born on December 4, 1932. He graduated from Duke University School of Medicine with a Bachelor of Science in Medicine (1956) and Doctor of Medicine. He completed his training at Duke University Medical Center, Barnes-Jewish Hospital, and Massachusetts General Hospital. Shealy was also a certified minister of Nemenhah ITO.

== Career ==
Shealy was the founding president of the American Holistic Medical Association. He spent 3 1/2 years at Western Reserve Medical School researching and developing spinal cord stimulator and transcutaneous electrical nerve stimulator (TENS™). Cincinnati Reds manager Sparky Anderson gave Shealy credit for their 1976 World Series winning season due to his use of biofeedback to help players manage their pain and return to play. He published over 300 articles and was the author of 29 books.

== Bibliography (selected) ==
- Shealy, C. Norman (1998). The Illustrated Encyclopedia of Healing Remedies. Shaftesbury: Element Books, Limited. ISBN 978-1-86204-187-5.
- Shealy, C. Norman (2005). Life Beyond 100: Secrets of the Fountain of Youth. Tarcher. ISBN 978-1-58542-431-3.
- Shealy, C. Norman (2014). Living Bliss: Major Discoveries along the Holistic Path. Carlsbad: Hay House. ISBN 978-1-4019-4264-9.

== Death ==
Shealy died on July 8, 2024, at the age of 91.
