= Erotic electrostimulation =

Sexual practice

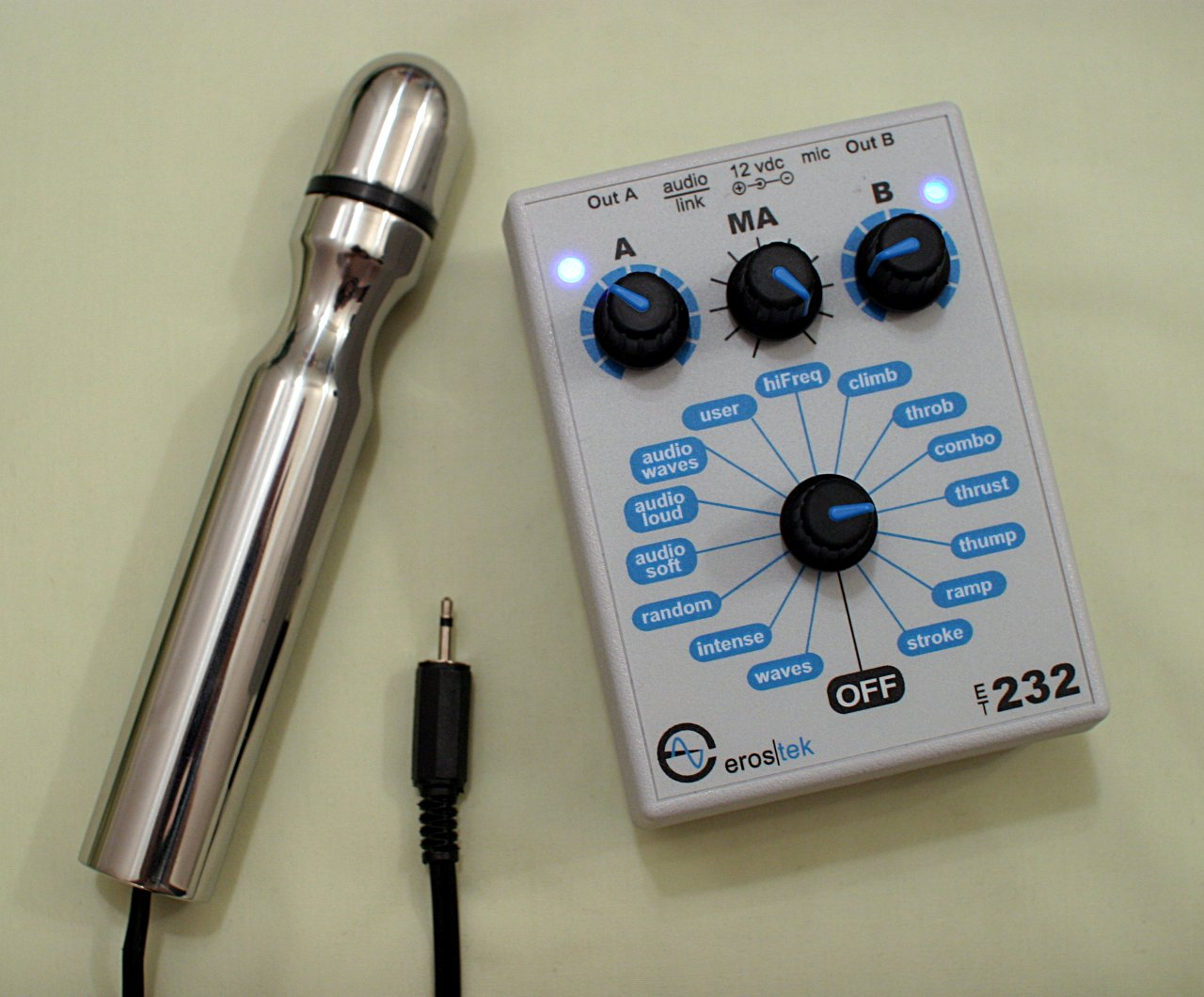
An erotic electrostimulation power source and electrode

Erotic electrostimulation (abbreviated erotic e-stim and also known as electrosex) is a sexual practice involving the application of electrical stimulation to the nerves of the body, with particular emphasis on the genitals, using a power source (such as a TENS, EMS, violet wands, or made-for-play units) for purposes of sexual stimulation. Electrostimulation has been associated with BDSM activities, and erotic electrostimulation is an evolution of that practice.

== Safety ==
Electrostimulation, in general, can cause tissue damage or even death if misused. The most common problems arising from electrostimulation tend to be electrical burns from lack of sufficiently wide surface contact, i.e. bad contact, between the electrode and the skin's surface. Even at relatively low current and voltage, there is also risk of interference with normal heart function (potentially including cardiac arrest), and this risk is higher for those who use an artificial pacemaker or similar device or who have heart conditions.

A few cases of accidental death as a result of autoerotic electrostimulation have been reported in the forensic science literature; the cases reported involved mains-powered, self-made devices, with current passing through the chest intentionally (usually via nipple stimulation) or unintentionally (for instance, touching an energized part with a hand). In one case reported in the press, a man from York, Pennsylvania was sentenced to 20–40 years in prison for third-degree murder and reckless endangerment after killing his wife with electrostimulation to her nipples directly from a power strip plugged into the mains (120Vrms @ 60Hz in the U.S.).

== History ==
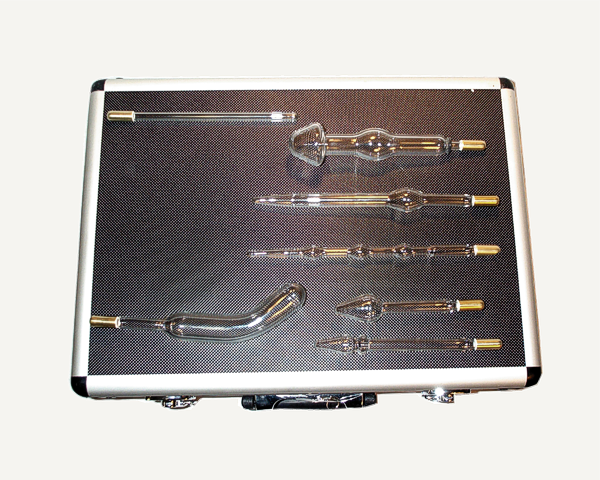
An assortment of erotic use insertable Violet Wand attachments known as electrodes. The tempered and evacuated glass tubes are back-filled with noble gas, causing them to emit sparks and glow with various colors when the violet wand is powered.

The use of electricity for entertainment purposes dates back at least as early as the 1740s. In the 1830s, insertable electrode attachments for small magnetos could be purchased. Later in the 1800s, various electric belts (some complete with "suspensory sack") were advertised as cures for impotence. In the 1920s, the American Medical Association investigated such devices, and concluded that they provided "more or less mechanical masturbation".

A popular US fitness product in the 1950s and 1960s was the Relax-A-Cizor, a device which used electrical muscle stimulation to achieve weight loss. It was also used for erotic stimulation. However, it caused a wide variety of health problems and was banned by the US government.

By the 1970s, medical TENS (transcutaneous electrical nerve stimulation) units were also being used for electrostimulation. In the 1980s the first devices manufactured specifically for erotic electrostimulation became available, in particular the Titillator and the Pleasure Box, later known as the PES Power Box.

In the 1970s, experimenters noticed that bare speaker wires could deliver a jolt and began using recorded and live sound for electrostimulation. At that time, there were no professionally made attachments for such play, so people built their own out of copper plumbing parts and other metal pieces with attention to resistors placed in series with the human parts to control the current for safety. Although early e-stim units used only a simple, pulsed, sinusoidal wave, newer units use more complex wave forms and also allow for the use of ambient sound or prerecorded wave forms like music or specially designed computer files for specific types of stimulation. There are now sites dedicated to the creation of MP3 files specifically for erotic journeys or symphonies, which can include such routines as rewards, punishments, very strong, and pleasantly soft portions.

== Electrodes ==
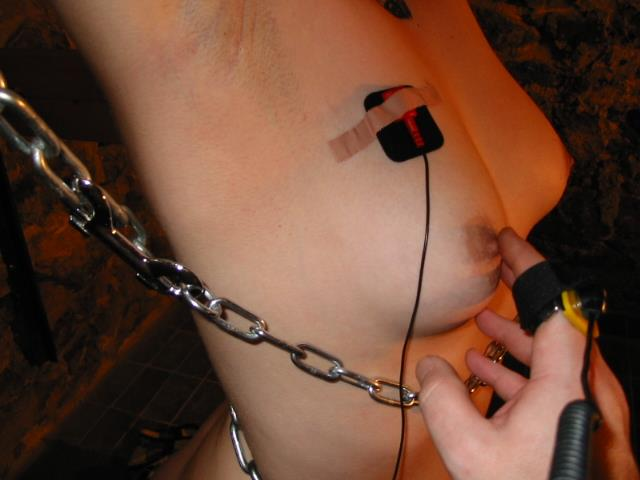
Example of woman with electrode on the chest

An electrode is used to deliver the actual electrostimulation to the body.

For erotic electrostimulation, these are typically items designed to be applied to the genitals such as vaginal plugs and shields, butt plugs, probes to directly stimulate the prostate, testicle rings, CBT boards, cock rings, urethral probes, and other items for penile application. The pads used with TENS units are also used in the sexual application of electrostimulation. There are also electrified nipple and breast electrodes available. The aforementioned electrodes stimulate the nerves between and underneath the area that they are placed, resulting in pleasure and orgasm.

The electrodes can be made of metals such as gold, silver, aluminum, and stainless steel. There are also electrodes made out of conductive silicone and conductive rubber.

== Violet wands ==
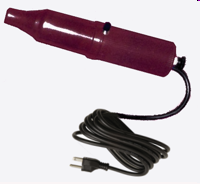
Erotec Violet Wand, from 2000

Violet wands were originally electric and neon testers, but are now split into two types: mechanical (Tesla Coil), and solid-state wands. They are used for the application of low current, high voltage (min 35 kV to max 65 kV typically), high-frequency electricity to the body, as such they are most commonly used in BDSM for erotic sensation play. Violet wands can deliver a variety of sharp, cutting, or piercing type sensations.

A violet wand typically consists of a hand-held "wand" made of plastic case which encases the mechanical (Tesla coil) or solid state components; a power cable, a collet (7/16" in the United States, 11 mm in Europe), and a cone. The collet is inside the cone end of the violet wand and is where glass and metal probes are inserted to be used with the wand. The cone is there to prevent sparks jumping from the collet directly to subject.

== See also ==
- Edgeplay
- Electrodiagnostic medicine
- Electroejaculation
- Brain stimulation reward
- TENS machine
