= Microcurrent electrical neuromuscular stimulator =

Device for sending small electrical pulses into the body

A microcurrent electrical neuromuscular stimulator or MENS (also microamperage electrical neuromuscular stimulator) is a device used to send weak electrical signals into the body. Such devices apply extremely small microamp [μA] electrical currents (less than 1 milliampere [mA]) to the tissues using electrodes placed on the skin. One microampere [μA] is 1 millionth of an ampere and the uses of MENS are distinct from those of "TENS" which runs at one milliamp [mA] or one thousandth of an amp.

== Uses ==
MENS uses include treatments for pain, diabetic neuropathy, age-related macular degeneration, wound healing, tendon repair, plantar fasciitis and ruptured ligament recovery. Most microcurrent treatments concentrate on pain and/or speeding healing and recovery. It is commonly used by professional and performance athletes with acute pain and/or muscle tenderness as it is drug-free and non-invasive, thus avoiding testing and recovery issues. It is also used as a cosmetic treatment.

== History ==
The body's electrical capabilities were studied at least as early as 1830, when the Italian Carlo Matteucci is credited as being one of the first to measure the electrical current in injured tissue. Bioelectricity received less attention after the discovery of penicillin, when the focus of medical research and treatments turned toward the body's chemical processes. Attention began to return to these properties and the possibilities of using very low current for healing in the mid-1900s. In a study published in 1969, for example, a team of researchers led by L.E. Wolcott applied microcurrent to a wide variety of wounds, using negative polarity over lesions in the initial phase, and then alternating application of positive and negative electrodes every three days. The stimulation current ranged from 200 to 800 uA and the treated group showed 200%-350% faster healing rates, with stronger tensile strength of scar tissue and antibacterial effects.

In 1991, the German scientists Drs. Erwin Neher and Bert Sakmann shared the Nobel Prize in Physiology or Medicine for their development of the patch-clamp technique that allows the detection of minute electrical currents through cell membranes. This method allowed the detection of more than 20 different types of ion channel which permit positive or negatively charged ions to cross the cell membrane, confirming that cellular electrical activity is not limited only to nerve and muscle tissues.

== Efficacy ==
A study by a neuroretinologist in the late 1980s suggested that microcurrent stimulation of acupuncture points for the eye had positive effects in slowing and even stopping progression of macular degeneration. This treatment is used to treat both the Wet and Dry forms of AMD. This study was based on Ngok Cheng's research on the increased amounts of ATP levels in living tissue after being stimulated with microcurrent.

== Mechanisms of action ==
While the mechanisms of efficacy are not well established, a few studies have shown that there may be a correlation between the traditional Chinese medical system of acupuncture and microcurrent. A study published in 1975 by Reichmanis, Marino, and Becker concluded in part that. "At most acupuncture points on most subjects, there were greater electrical conductance maxims than at control sites."

== Manufacturers ==
Many companies manufacture microcurrent devices for both professional and personal use, and microcurrent stimulation is used as a "complementary" veterinary modality.

== See also ==
- Acupuncture
- Electrical muscle stimulation
- Electroacupuncture
- Macular degeneration
- Percutaneous tibial nerve stimulation
- TENS
