= Philip Harris Ltd. =

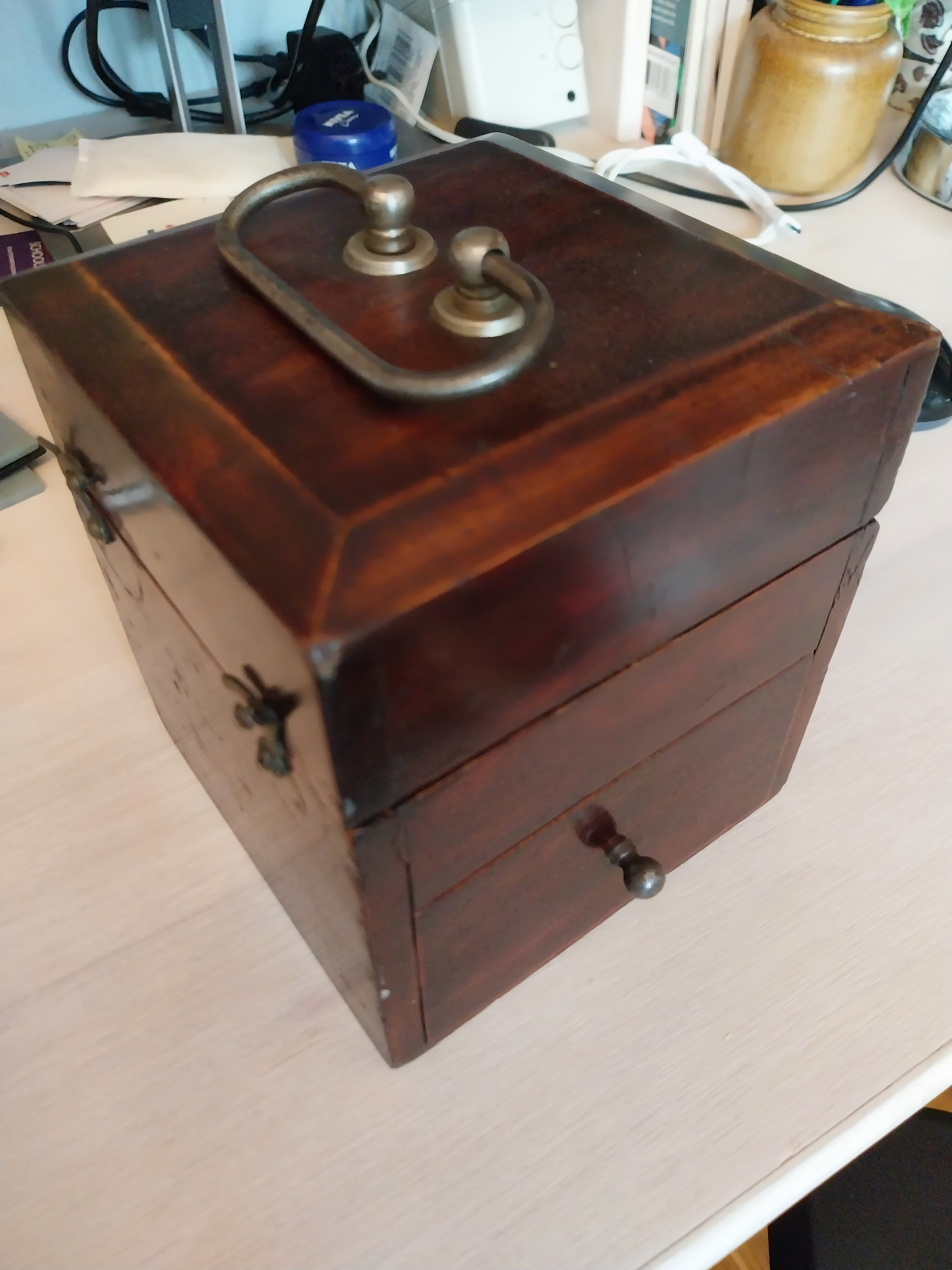
A portable Faradic Battery by Philip Harris & Co. from 1913

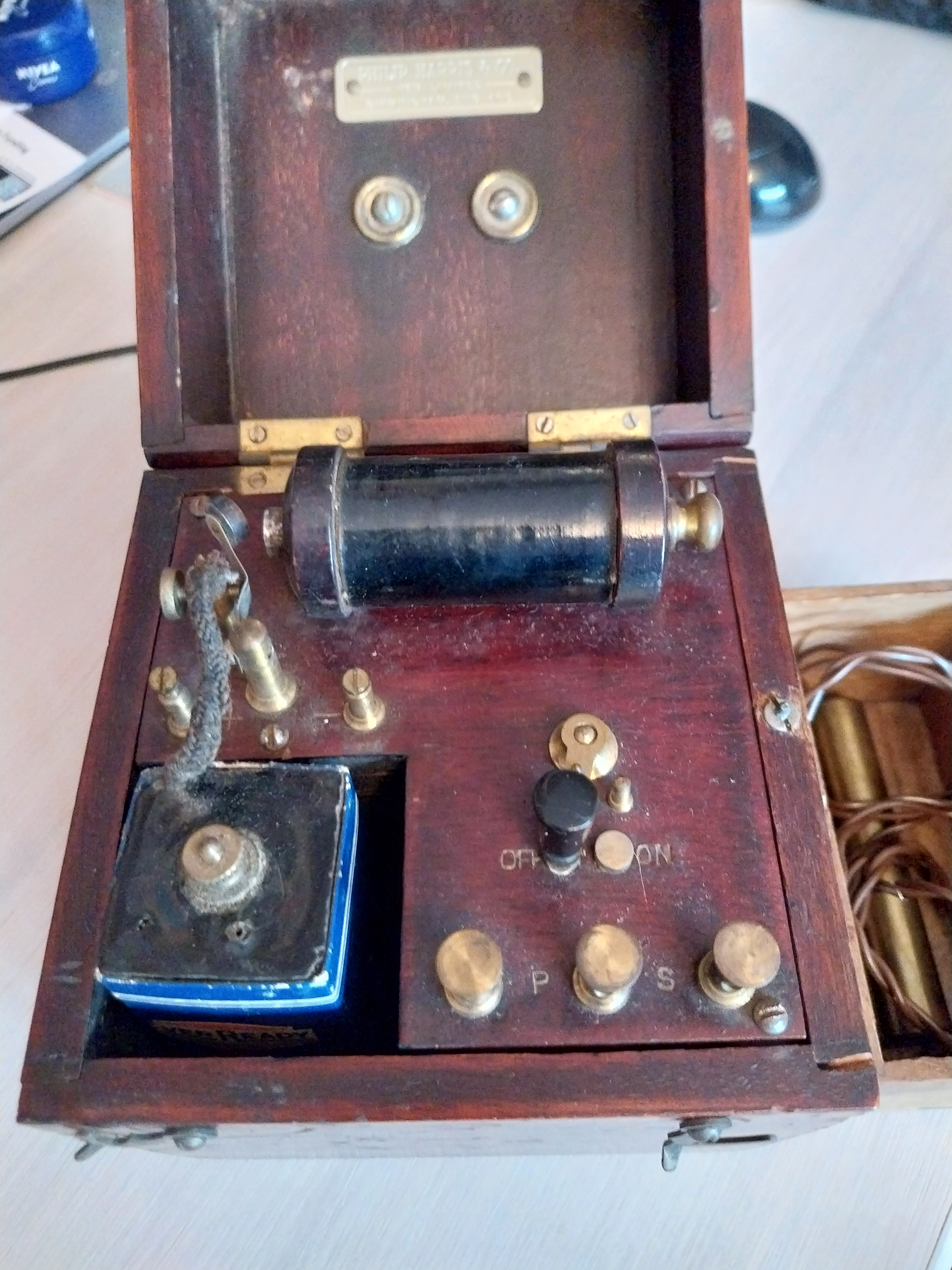
Interior of box

Philip Harris Ltd was a British laboratory supply company (part of Philip Harris plc) which became a major supplier of equipment for school science. The brand name is now owned by Findel plc.

The company was originally based in Digbeth, Birmingham, and was started by Thomas Ellis, a surgeon, in 1817. At the time, Philip Harris would have been only 15 or 16 years old; he joined Ellis in 1825.

The company traded as a wholesale Chemical Laboratory Company, occupying a site in the Bull Ring until 1889 (when according to their Catalogue of chemical and physical apparatus and chemicals, dated 1889, silver nitrate was selling for 9 shillings per ounce). They moved to 144–146 Edmund Street at some time around the turn of the 20th century.

Philip Harris started as a manufacturer of chemists' and surgical products, adding medicines in 1866. In the 1960s and 1970s, biological and manufacturing units were established at Weston-super-Mare. The main office was latterly at Shenstone near Lichfield. The biological unit, 'Harris Biological Supplies Ltd', traded as South Yorkshire Biological Supplies Ltd until its acquisition by Philip Harris; around October 1965 it was moved from Arundel Street, Sheffield, to Weston-super-Mare.

In the mid-1960s, the company played an important role in developing and supplying equipment for the new Nuffield science courses in England and Wales. This innovation continued into the 1980s and 1990s with the development of some of the earliest scientific data-loggers to appear anywhere outside academic research laboratories.
