= List of forms of electricity named after scientists =

This is a list of forms of electricity named after scientists. The terms in this list are mostly archaic usages but are found in many 19th and early 20th-century publications.

== Adjectives ==
faradic
Of electricity that is alternating, especially when obtained from an induction coil. Named after Michael Faraday who built the first electromagnetic generator.
galvanic
Of electricity that is not alternating. Named after Luigi Galvani.
voltaic
Of electricity derived from an electrochemical cell or battery. Named after Alessandro Volta who built the first battery, the voltaic pile. In most contexts it can be considered a synonym of galvanic.

== Nouns (applications) ==
Faradization
Electrotherapy treatment of a person with faradic electricity. Coined by Duchenne de Boulogne and named after Michael Faraday.
Franklinization
Electrotherapy by charging a person to high voltage with static electricity. Named after Benjamin Franklin.
d'Arsonvalization
Electrotherapy treatment of a person with high frequency electricity. Named after Jacques-Arsène d'Arsonval.

== Nouns (forms) ==
Faradism
Faradic electricity
Franklinism
High voltage static electricity as used in Franklinization
Galvanism
Originally, voltaic electricity, but can also be used to distinguish Galvani's animal electricity from Volta's chemical/metal contact electricity

== Bibliography ==
- Borck, Cornelius, Brainwaves: A Cultural History of Electroencephalography, Routledge, 2018 ISBN 1472469445.
- Chalovich, Joseph M, Franklinization: Early Therapeutic Use of Static Electricity, ScholarShip, East Carolina University, 23 January 2012.
- Martellucci, Jacopo (ed), Electrical Stimulation for Pelvic Floor Disorders, Springer, 2014 ISBN 3319069470.
- de la Peňa, Carolyn Thomas, The Body Electric: How Strange Machines Built the Modern American, New York University Press, 2005 ISBN 081471983X.
- Pinchuck, LS; Nikolaev, VI; Tsetkova, EA; Goldade, VA, Tribology and Biophysics of Artificial Joints, Elsevier, 2005 ISBN 0080458084.
- Tate, Thomas, On Magnetism, Voltaic Electricity, and Electrodynamics, London: Longman, Brown, Green, and Longmans, 1854 OCLC 316488126.
- de Young, Mary, Encyclopedia of Asylum Therapeutics, 1750-1950s, McFarland, 2015 ISBN 0786468971.
