= Neuromuscular diagnostics =

Medical testing for the muscular and nervous systems

Neuromuscular diagnostic tests are medical tests performed to diagnose disorders of the muscles and nerves. The most common neuromuscular diagnostic tests include:

- Electromyography
- Evoked potential
- Muscle biopsy
- Nerve biopsy
