= Electroacupuncture =

Form of acupuncture

- MeSH: D015671

Electroacupuncture is a form of acupuncture where a small electric current is passed between pairs of acupuncture needles.

The Cochrane Collaboration, a group of evidence-based medicine (EBM) reviewers, reviewed acupuncture and electroacupuncture for the treatment of rheumatoid arthritis. Because of the small number and poor quality of studies, they found no evidence to recommend its use for this condition. The reviewers concluded:

"Although the results of the study on electroacupuncture show that electroacupuncture may be beneficial to reduce symptomatic knee pain in patients with RA 24 hours and 4 months post treatment, the reviewers concluded that the poor quality of the trial, including the small sample size preclude its recommendation. The reviewers further conclude that acupuncture has no effect on ESR, CRP, pain, patient's global assessment, number of swollen joints, number of tender joints, general health, disease activity and reduction of analgesics. These conclusions are limited by methodological considerations such as the type of acupuncture (acupuncture vs electroacupuncture), the site of intervention, the low number of clinical trials and the small sample size of the included studies."

A 2016 systematic review and meta-analysis found inconclusive evidence that electroacupuncture was effective for nausea and vomiting and hyperemesis gravidarum during pregnancy. The American Cancer Society has concluded that the evidence does not support the use of EAV "as a method that can diagnose, cure, or otherwise help people with cancer" or "as a reliable aid in diagnosis or treatment of ... other illness".

== See also ==
- Alternative medicine
- Microcurrent electrical neuromuscular stimulator
- Transcutaneous electrical nerve stimulation
