= Gait trainer =

Mobility device

A gait trainer is a wheeled device that assists a person who is unable to walk independently to learn or relearn to walk safely and efficiently as part of gait training. Gait trainers are intended for children or adults with physical disabilities, to provide the opportunity to improve walking ability. A gait trainer offers both unweighting support and postural alignment to enable gait practice. It functions as a support walker and provides more assistance for balance and weight-bearing, than does a traditional rollator walker, or a walker with platform attachments. It also provides opportunities to stand and to bear weight in a safe, supported position.

Various movement disorders can result in the inability to walk independently, necessitating the use of a gait trainer. Such motor disability may be due to a medical condition from childhood, such as cerebral palsy, spina bifida, or other developmental disabilities. Or, walking impairment may be due to a later injury or illness, such as a traumatic brain injury, incomplete spinal cord injury or stroke. Regardless of the cause of disability, the child or adult may learn to walk, or recover the ability to walk, through walking practice. Recent discoveries in the field of neuroplasticity indicate the human potential for improvement in motor skills through activity-based therapy, despite neural damage from condition or injury. Although total independence in gait may not be achieved in every case, significant gains can be made in muscle strength and neuromotor control for walking, through locomotor training.

== Pediatric use of gait trainers ==
One of the first gait trainers for use by children with developmental disabilities was developed in the mid-1980s for use with the MOVE Curriculum, by a special education teacher in California, Linda Bidabe, in collaboration with others at the Blair Learning Center. Since that time, pediatric gait trainer design has evolved and been refined, and several manufacturers have developed quality gait trainers.

== Use of gait trainers for adult rehabilitation ==
In adult rehabilitation, gait training is traditionally performed initially within parallel bars as the most stable assistive device. As walking improves, a patient can progress to a walker, crutches, bilateral canes or a single cane. This gait training typically occurs during physical therapy sessions. The more recent development of body-weight support gait training, such as over a treadmill, can enable considerably more walking practice with less strain to the therapist, when compared to traditional gait training.

In adult rehabilitation, the use of body-weight support (BWS) systems enables patients to walk safely with less effort. Body-weight support systems enable walking practice over a treadmill. Or, they may enable walking over ground from a mobile device or ceiling track. Because of the support provided by the system, the strain to the therapist is reduced. This, along with the patient being adequately supported for balance and weight bearing assist, increases the duration of walking practice. This effective therapy increases potential for motor skill gains. The more opportunity for practice and repetitions of step-taking, the more likely is the patient to regain walking ability.

The use of over ground support walkers as an approach for gait training for the adult population is another recent development in adult rehabilitation. The value of over ground gait trainers is that these devices are typically more affordable than BWS systems, and they enable additional walking practice beyond the physical therapy session, whether in the institution or in the patient's home or community environment. By using a gait trainer for over ground walking practice, the patient has support for balance and can now incorporate walking practice into his or her daily routine. For example, rather than remaining in a wheelchair between gait therapy sessions, an individual can use the over ground gait trainer for walking practice to and from the cafeteria within an institution, or while at a mall when out in the community. Early research indicates that sufficient over ground locomotor training may result in equivalent or possibly greater improvements in walking capacity as compared to the body-weight support treadmill training. The over ground walking practice is a closer replication to the real-world task of walking. The voluntary effort of step initiation and forward progression is essential for walking over ground, and these devices enable the patient to learn how to generate and control these motor forces in a way that is not available on a treadmill.

== See also ==
- Walker (mobility)
