= Percutaneous tibial nerve stimulation =

- Specialty: Urology

Percutaneous tibial nerve stimulation (PTNS), also referred to as posterior tibial nerve stimulation, is the least invasive form of neuromodulation used to treat overactive bladder (OAB) and the associated symptoms of urinary urgency, urinary frequency and urge incontinence. These urinary symptoms may also occur with interstitial cystitis and following a radical prostatectomy. Outside the United States, PTNS is also used to treat fecal incontinence.

PTNS can be used as a primary therapy. Treatment for overactive bladder and fecal incontinence may begin with pharmacological therapies before PTNS is administered. Unlike the variety of OAB drugs available PTNS is more effective and produces far fewer side-effects. Nearly 80% of patients discontinue use (mean of 4.8 months) of drugs within the first year with as high as 17% of discontinuation being due to adverse side-effects. Neuromodulation is emerging as an effective modality to treat patients who are not successful with conservative methods and its demonstrated efficacy has been the topic of multiple publications.

== Medical uses ==
=== Urinary incontinence ===
PTNS appears to be effective at improving the number of times a person who has overactive bladder syndrome needs to urinate, although the mechanism for this is unclear. It appears to work as well as medication, but with fewer side effects.

=== Fecal incontinence ===
A meta-review that considered mostly low quality studies found tentative evidence of a benefit for PTNS in fecal incontinence. However, a more recent high quality study however did not identify a benefit.

== Procedure ==
A patient sits comfortably with the treatment leg elevated. A fine needle electrode is inserted into the lower, inner aspect of the leg, slightly cephalad/rostral to the medial malleolus. As the goal is to send stimulation through the tibial nerve, it is important to have the needle electrode near (but not on) the tibial nerve. A surface electrode (grounding pad) is placed over the medial aspect of the calcaneus on the same leg. The needle electrode is then connected to an external pulse generator which delivers an adjustable electrical pulse that travels to the sacral plexus via the tibial nerve. Among other functions, the sacral nerve plexus regulates bladder and pelvic floor function.

With correct placement of the needle electrode and level of electrical impulse, there is often an involuntary toe flex or fan, or an extension of the entire foot. However, for some patients, the correct placement and stimulation may only result in a mild sensation in the ankle area or across the sole of the foot.

The treatment protocol requires once-a-week treatments for 12 weeks, 30 minutes per session. Many patients begin to see improvements by the 6th treatment. Patients who respond to treatment may require occasional treatments (about once every three weeks or as needed) to sustain improvements.

PTNS is a low-risk procedure. The most common side-effects with PTNS treatment are temporary and minor, resulting from the placement of the needle electrode. They include minor bleeding, mild pain and skin inflammation.

== Research and market approval ==
The methodology was first invented by Marshall Stoller at UCSF Medical Center, San Francisco, and was first known as the SANS (Stoller Afferent Nerve Stimulator) protocol.

In 2000, Stoller reported that 98 patients were treated with the SANS device with an approximate 80% success rate in treating urge incontinence syndrome, including urgency and frequency. In a corroborative multi-center study by Govier, et al., 71% of patients achieved success. Additionally, in a study by Shafik, et al., 78% of patients achieved a long-term improvement in faecal incontinence when treated with PTNS.

Regulatory clearances were based on these data. A PTNS device received FDA-clearance for urinary urgency, urinary frequency and urge incontinence in 2000; in 2010, the clearance was updated to include overactive bladder (OAB). A PTNS device received the CE mark for urinary urgency, urinary frequency and urge incontinence and fecal incontinence in 2005.

Since 2005, Uroplasty has marketed the Urgent PC Neuromodulation System. In 2015, Medtronic acquired Advanced Uro-Solutions for its PTNS therapy, and began marketing the NURO PTNM System in 2016.

== U.S. reimbursement ==
Effective January 1, 2011, the PTNS procedure will be billed under the new CPT code 64566, with the descriptor "Posterior tibial neurostimulation, percutaneous needle electrode, single treatment, includes programming."

== U.K. NICE guidance ==
In October 2010, the National Institute for Clinical Excellence (NICE) issued NICE Interventional Procedure Guidance 362 supporting the use of percutaneous tibial nerve stimulation (PTNS) as a routine treatment for overactive bladder syndrome. Highlights of the NICE guidance include: Evidence shows that PTNS is effective in reducing symptoms in the short and medium term.

There are no major safety concerns.

It can be offered routinely as a treatment option for people with overactive bladder provided that doctors are sure that the patients understand what is involved and agree to the treatment and that the results of the procedure are monitored.

A NICE guidance for fecal incontinence is currently under review.

== Transcutaneous tibial nerve stimulation ==
Recent studies have been carried out to demonstrate the efficacy of transcutaneous tibial nerve stimulation with the use of external electrodes. Electrodes are applied near to the ankle where the tibial/sural nerve is located. It is believed that the electrical stimulation can penetrate the skin delivering tibial nerve stimulation in the same way, but without the need for a needle electrode.

It is thought that further studies on alternative possible treatments, such as home based transcutaneous stimulation, are needed. However, it has proved a viable and successful treatment for many.

== See also ==
- Interstitial cystitis
