= Electrical muscle stimulation =

Use of electricity to involuntarily contract muscle

Electrical muscle stimulation (EMS), also known as neuromuscular electrical stimulation (NMES) or electromyostimulation, is the elicitation of muscle contraction using electrical impulses. EMS has received attention for various reasons: it can be utilized as a strength training tool for healthy subjects and athletes; it could be used as a rehabilitation and preventive tool for people who are partially or totally immobilized; it could be utilized as a testing tool for evaluating the neural and/or muscular function in vivo. EMS has been proven to be more beneficial before exercise and activity due to early muscle activation. Electrostimulation has been found to be ineffective during post exercise recovery and can even lead to an increase in delayed onset muscle soreness (DOMS).

The impulses are generated by the device and are delivered through electrodes on the skin near to the muscles being stimulated. The electrodes are generally pads that adhere to the skin. The impulses mimic the action potential that comes from the central nervous system, causing the muscles to contract. The use of EMS has been cited by sports scientists as a complementary technique for sports training, and published research is available on the results obtained. In the United States, EMS devices are regulated by the U.S. Food and Drug Administration (FDA).

A number of reviews have looked at the devices.

== Uses ==
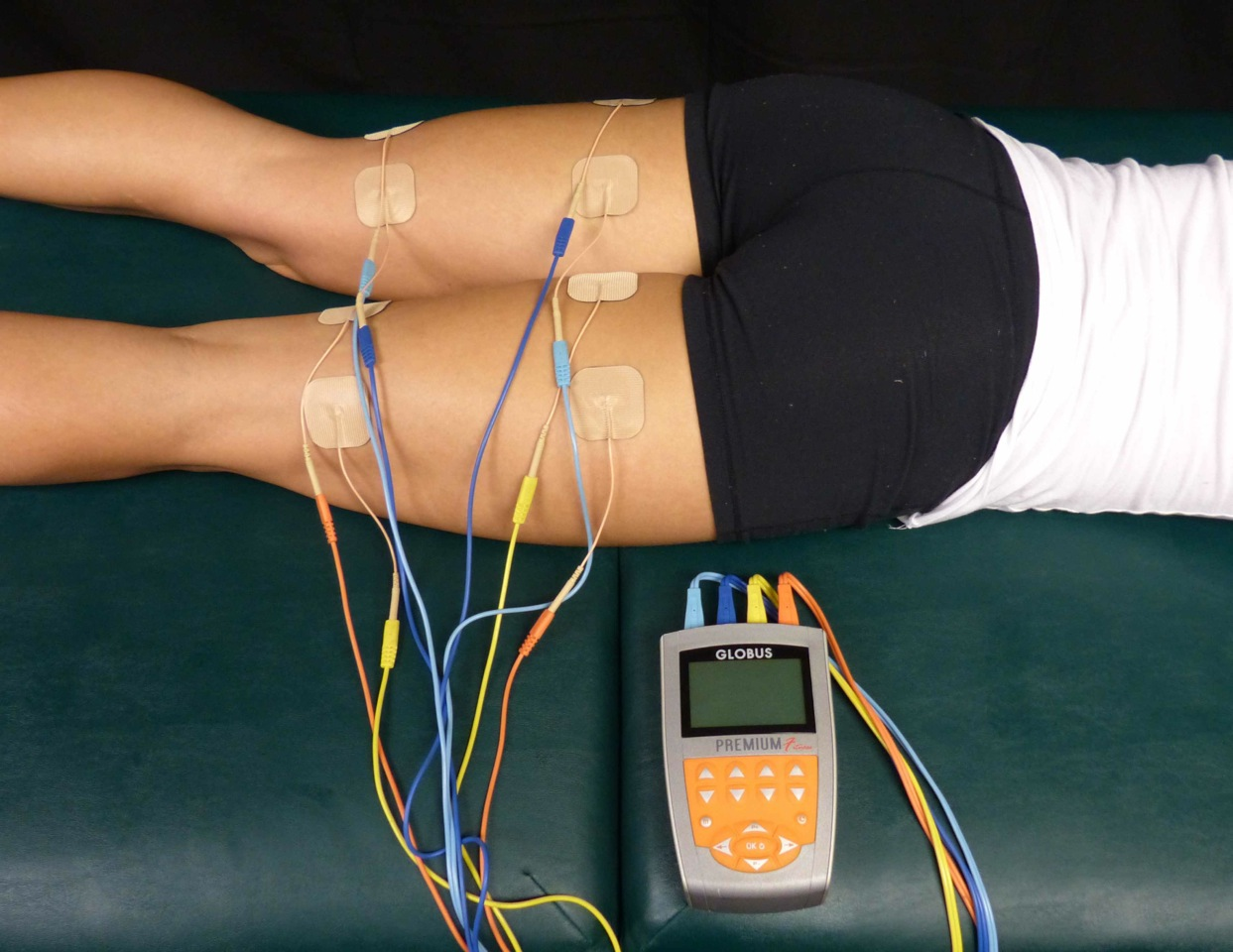
Athlete recovering with four-channel, electrical muscle stimulation machine attached through self-adhesive pads to her hamstrings

Electrical muscle stimulation can be used as a training, therapeutic, or cosmetic tool.

=== Mechanism of action ===
NMES works by delivering electrical impulses that cause involuntary muscle contractions, mimicking the effects of voluntary exercise. In addition to directly stimulating muscle fibers, recent research has shown that NMES activates corticomotor pathways, engaging both peripheral and central nervous system structures. This process helps activate fast-twitch muscle fibers and promotes neural adaptations similar to those seen with voluntary high-intensity exercise.

=== Physical rehabilitation ===
In medicine, EMS is used for rehabilitation purposes, for instance in physical therapy in the prevention of muscle atrophy due to inactivity or neuromuscular imbalance, which can occur for example after musculoskeletal injuries (damage to bones, joints, muscles, ligaments and tendons). This is distinct from transcutaneous electrical nerve stimulation (TENS), in which an electric current is used for pain therapy. "The main difference is the desired outcome. TENS unit is a medical device for pain relief. The desired outcome is to reduce pain by stimulating different nerve signals. EMS fitness is also an FDA-cleared medical device but meant for muscle development. EMS fitness is designed to stimulate all the major muscle groups to elicit strength and endurance adaptations."

For people who have progressive diseases such as cancer or chronic obstructive pulmonary disease, EMS is used to improve muscle weakness for those unable or unwilling to undertake whole-body exercise. EMS may lead to statistically significant improvement in quadriceps muscle strength, however, further research is needed as this evidence is graded as low certainty. The same study also indicates that EMS may lead to increased muscle mass. Low certainty evidence indicates that adding EMS to an existing exercise programme may help people who are unwell spend fewer days confined to their beds. Additionally, neuromuscular electrical stimulation (NMES) has been shown to improve functional capacity, walking distance, and muscle strength in patients undergoing hemodialysis for end-stage renal disease, with no major adverse effects reported.

NMES has been found to be effective in treating certain upper and lower extremity issues post-stroke, weakness following ACL repair and total knee replacement, muscle weakness in knee osteoarthritis, and debilitation and weakness after critical illnesses. However, the benefit of NMES for patellofemoral pain syndrome (PFPS) remains uncertain.

During EMS training, a set of complementary muscle groups (e.g., biceps and triceps) are often targeted in alternating fashion, for specific training goals, such as improving the ability to reach for an item.

=== Weight loss ===
The FDA rejects certification of devices that claim weight reduction. EMS devices cause a calorie burning that is marginal at best: calories are burnt in significant amount only when most of the body is involved in physical exercise: several muscles, the heart and the respiratory system are all engaged at once. However, some authors imply that EMS can lead to exercise since people toning their muscles with electrical stimulation are more likely afterwards to participate in sporting activities as the body becomes ready, fit, willing and able to take on physical activity.

=== Effects ===
"Strength training by NMES does promote neural and muscular adaptations that are complementary to the well-known effects of voluntary resistance training". This statement is part of the editorial summary of a 2010 world congress of researchers on the subject. Additional studies on practical applications, which came after that congress, pointed out important factors that make the difference between effective and ineffective EMS. This in retrospect explains why in the past some researchers and practitioners obtained results that others could not reproduce. Also, as published by reputable universities, EMS causes adaptation, i.e. training, of muscle fibers. Because of the characteristics of skeletal muscle fibers, different types of fibers can be activated to differing degrees by different types of EMS, and the modifications induced depend on the pattern of EMS activity. These patterns, referred to as protocols or programs, will cause a different response from contraction of different fiber types. Some programs will improve fatigue resistance, i.e. endurance, others will increase force production. Some important considerations prior for the use of NMES are to make sure there are no present bone fractures, burns, skin lesions, lupus erythematosus, thromboembolic disease, deep vein thrombosis

== History ==
Luigi Galvani (1761) provided the first scientific evidence that current can activate muscle. During the 19th and 20th centuries, researchers studied and documented the exact electrical properties that generate muscle movement. It was discovered that the body functions induced by electrical stimulation caused long-term changes in the muscles. In the 1960s, Soviet sport scientists applied EMS in the training of elite athletes, claiming 40% force gains. In the 1970s, these studies were shared during conferences with the Western sport establishments. However, results were conflicting, perhaps because the mechanisms in which EMS acted were poorly understood. Medical physiology research pinpointed the mechanisms by which electrical stimulation causes adaptation of cells of muscles, blood vessels and nerves.

== Society and culture ==
=== United States regulation ===
The U.S. Food and Drug Administration (FDA) certifies and releases EMS devices into two broad categories: over-the counter devices (OTC), and prescription devices. OTC devices are marketable only for muscle toning; prescription devices can be purchased only with a medical prescription for therapy. Prescription devices should be used under the supervision of an authorized practitioner, for the following uses:

- Relaxation of muscle spasms;
- Prevention or retardation of disuse atrophy;
- Increasing local blood circulation;
- Muscle re-education;
- Immediate post-surgical stimulation of calf muscles to prevent venous thrombosis;
- Maintaining or increasing range of motion.

The FDA mandates that manuals prominently display contraindication, warnings, precautions and adverse reactions, including: no use for wearer of pacemaker; no use on vital parts, such as carotid sinus nerves, across the chest, or across the brain; caution in the use during pregnancy, menstruation, and other particular conditions that may be affected by muscle contractions; potential adverse effects include skin irritations and burns

Only FDA-certified devices can be lawfully sold in the US without medical prescription. These can be found at the corresponding FDA webpage for certified devices. The FTC has cracked down on consumer EMS devices that made unsubstantiated claims; many have been removed from the market, some have obtained FDA certification.

== See also ==
- Electroacupuncture
- Functional electrical stimulation
- Microcurrent electrical neuromuscular stimulator
- Transcutaneous electrical nerve stimulation
