= Facial rejuvenation =

Cosmetic treatment to restore youthful appearance

Facial rejuvenation is a cosmetic treatment (or series of cosmetic treatments), which aims to restore a youthful appearance to the human face. Facial rejuvenation can be achieved through either surgical and/or non-surgical options. Procedures can vary in invasiveness and depth of treatment. Surgical procedures can restore facial symmetry through targeted procedures and facial restructuring and skin alterations. Non-surgical procedures can target specific depths of facial structures and treat localized facial concerns such as wrinkles, skin laxity, hyperpigmentation and scars.

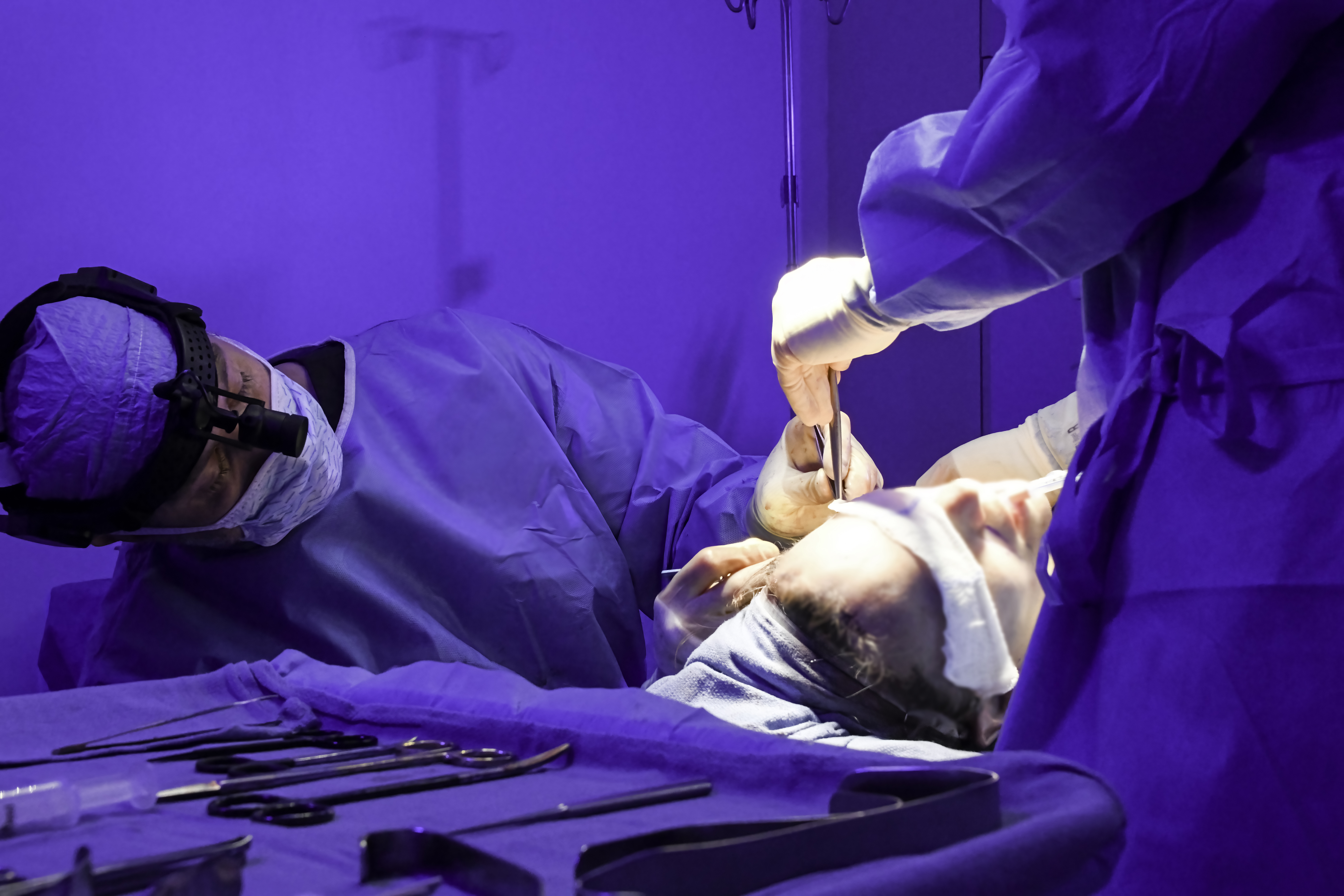
Facial plastic surgery procedure performed under sterile operating room conditions.

Surgical (invasive) facial rejuvenation procedures can include a brow lift (forehead lift), eye lift (blepharoplasty), facelift (rhytidectomy), chin lift and neck lift. Non-surgical (non-invasive) facial rejuvenation treatments can include chemical peels, neuromodulator (such as botox), dermal fillers, laser resurfacing, photorejuvenation, radiofrequency, and ultrasound.

== Visual appraisal of facial youthfulness ==
Human visual perception is notable for its sensitivity and accuracy in estimating our perceived age by instant pattern recognition of facial features. Often, human faces with no measurable difference in facial geometry and appearance are perceived as having different ages. This mechanism is not yet entirely understood, but there may be a relation to the subtle changes in facial bone structure related below.

== Golden ratio ==
Facial symmetry has a direct relationship to perceived beauty. A guiding approach to facial rejuvenation and balancing facial symmetry is through an application of the golden ratio. Artists and architects have been using this ratio to create works that are pleasing to the eye for centuries. Aesthetic medicine and facial rejuvenation techniques has adopted this mathematical approach to facial restoration and enhancement.

== Influence of changes in bone structure ==
More recent research has pointed out the influence of changes in the facial skeleton with age on the appearance of aging, especially in the mid-face area and the lower part of the orbits around the nose. Quantitative study with CAT scans of the faces of men and women in several age brackets has revealed that there is an appreciable amount of bone tissue loss in these regions with age, leading to changes in angles, lengths and volumes, and also decreasing the distance between the eyes. It has been hypothesized that skin sagging and wrinkles may occur not only because of loss of soft tissue and fat, but also because bone retraction creates an excess of skin which is no longer flexible. Many of the facial manifestations of aging reflect the combined effects of gravity, progressive bone resorption, decreased tissue elasticity, and redistribution of subcutaneous fullness. Future facial rejuvenation techniques may take into account these findings and restore bone lost by aging processes.

== Trends in facial rejuvenation ==
According to the American Society of Plastic Surgeons, more than 133,000 facelifts and nearly 216,000 eyelid surgeries were performed in the US in 2013, a six per cent increase from 2012. Facial rejuvenation procedures experienced the most growth, as 2013 marked the highest number of botulinum toxin type A injections to date, with 6.3 million injections. A significant upward trend on the number of facial rejuvenation procedures is predicted, and could be due to the following factors:

1. Men have also started to perform these procedures at increasing numbers;
2. Emphasis on image of youthfulness by the mass media and fashion;
3. Increasing numbers of senior people enjoying good health and financial affluence at older ages;
4. Decreasing costs of surgery and other cosmetic procedures, making them affordable to all

However, while surgical procedures are still preferred to achieve a more dramatic improvement, the current trend is towards less invasive procedures, such as injectables (Botox, fillers) and laser skin treatments. While these treatments achieve temporary results, they tend to be preferred because of their reduced cost and less intensive recovery period.

== Procedures ==
Facial rejuvenation procedures can include (but are not limited to):

- Botox injections
- Chemical peels
- Collagen injection
- Cosmetic acupuncture
- Dermal filler injections
- Electrotherapy
- Facial toning
- Fraxel
- Microdermabrasion
- Photorejuvenation
- Laser resurfacing
- Nd:YAG laser
- Permanent makeup
- Platelet-rich fibrin matrix method

== See also ==
- Aesthetic medicine
- Cosmetic surgery
- Cosmetics
- Plastic surgery
- Rejuvenation (aging)
- Modiolus (face)
