= Mewing (orthotropics) =

Purported form of oral posture training

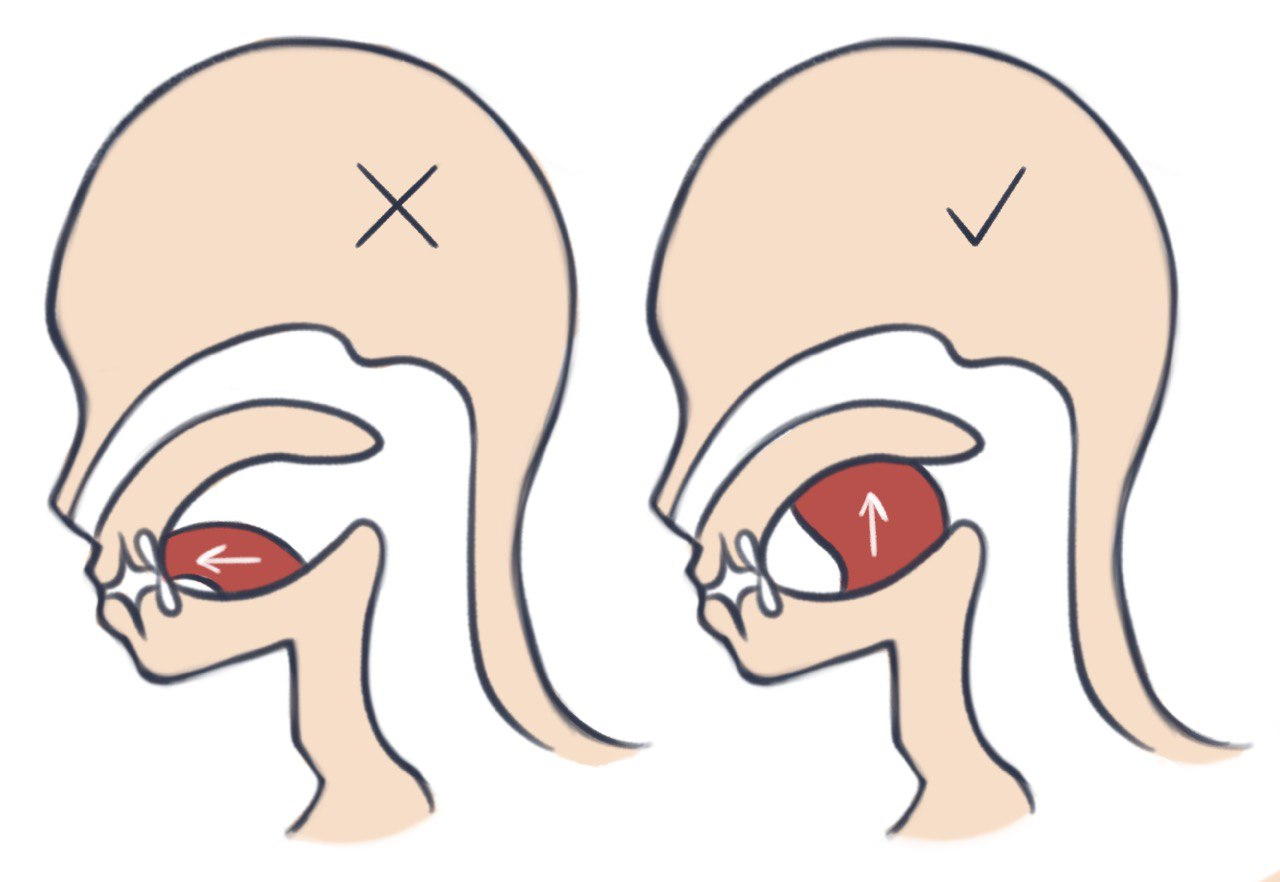
A diagram of a comparison showing the tongue lying on the roof of the jaw when mewing (right), vs the regular jaw.

Mewing is an unproven form of oral posture training purported to improve jaw and facial structure. It was named after British orthodontist John Mew, who created the technique as a part of a practice called "orthotropics", together with his son Mike. It involves placing one's tongue at the roof of the mouth and applying pressure, purportedly to modify the structure of the jaws.

== Overview ==
No credible scientific research has ever proven the efficacy of orthotropics, and most orthodontists do not view mewing as a viable alternative treatment to orthognathic surgery. According to the American Association of Orthodontists, there are no evidence of mewing improving your jaw.

Mike Mew was expelled from the British Orthodontic Society and faced a misconduct hearing for posing harm to child patients who underwent his treatments. In 2024, Mew was struck from the dental register in the United Kingdom.

== Reception ==
Since 2019, mewing has received widespread media coverage due to its virality on social media, especially in incel and looksmaxxing subcultures, and has been associated with "brain rot". Data from Google Trends indicates that interest in "mewing" began to rise in January 2019. Its popularity has reportedly also affected school students, with some apparently mewing in class to avoid answering questions when prompted by teachers.

== See also ==
- Facial toning
- The Rizzler
