= Contracture =

Permanent shortening of a muscle or joint

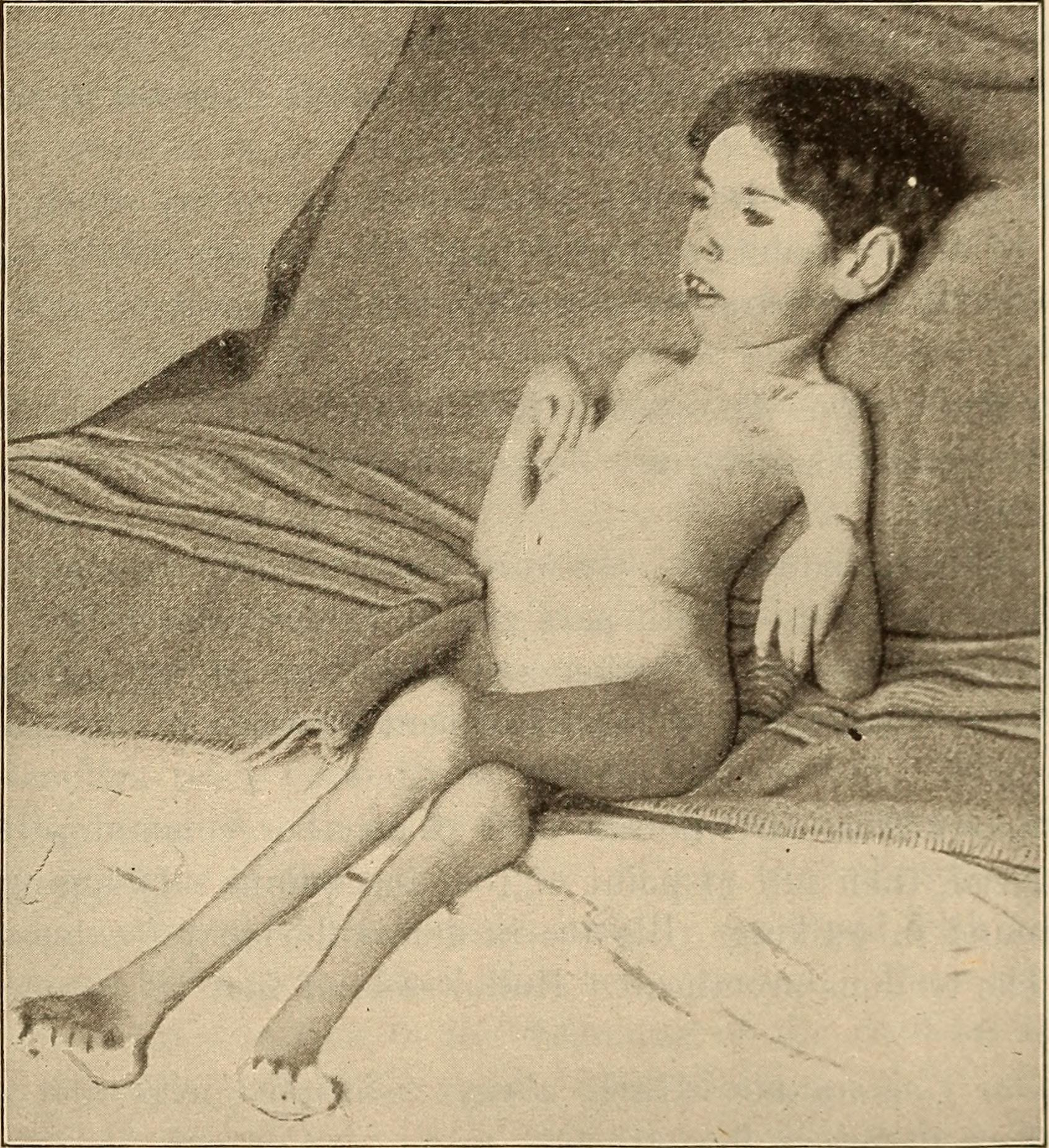
- Specialty: Orthopedics

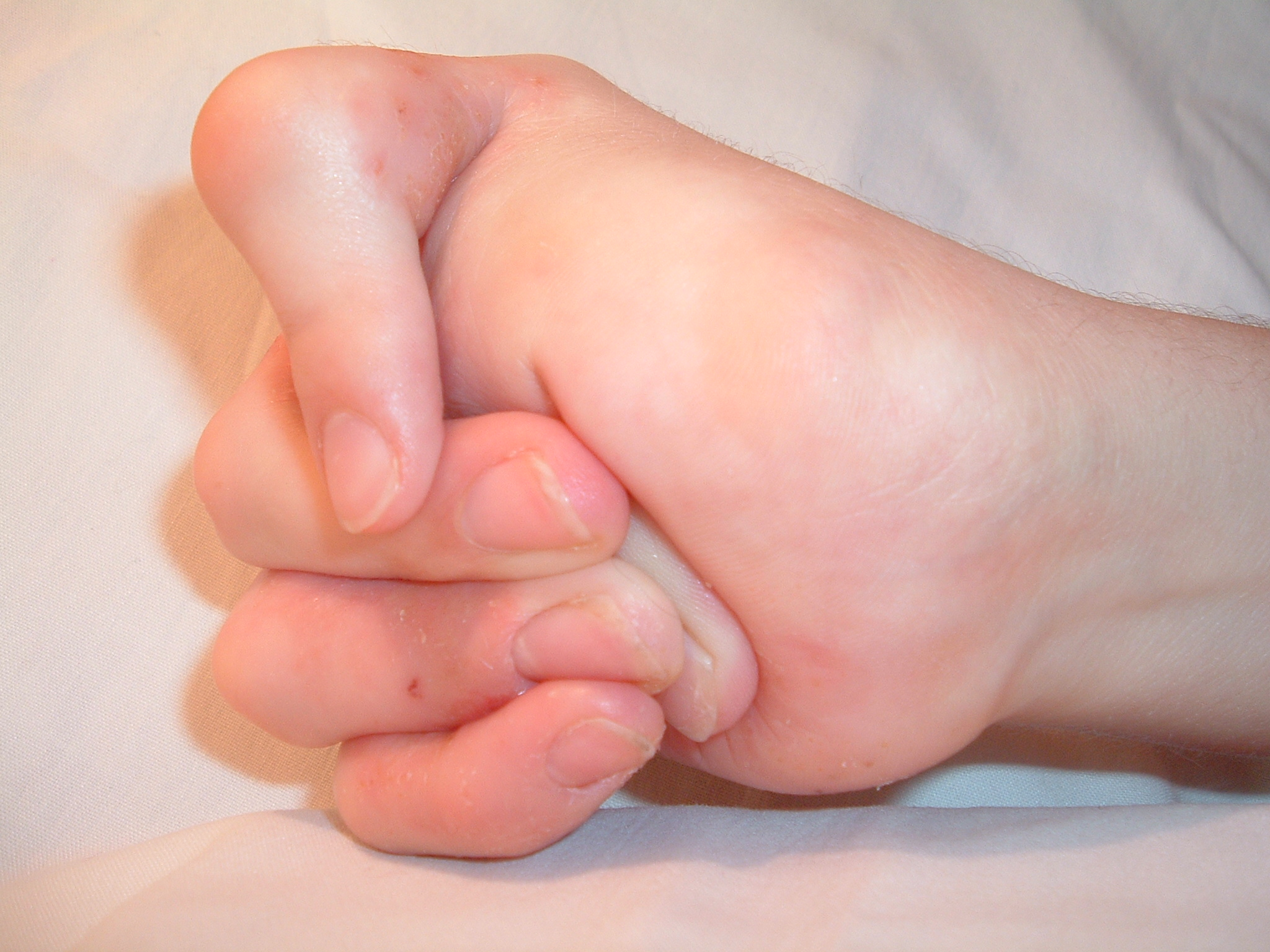
Hand contractures as seen in Freeman–Sheldon syndrome

In pathology, a contracture is a shortening of muscles, tendons, skin, and nearby soft tissues that causes the joints to shorten and become very stiff, preventing normal movement. A contracture is usually permanent, but less commonly can be temporary (such as in McArdle disease), or resolve over time but reoccur later in life (such as in Bethlem myopathy 1).

It is usually in response to prolonged hypertonic spasticity in a concentrated muscle area, such as is seen in the tightest muscles of people with conditions like spastic cerebral palsy, but can also be due to the congenital abnormal development of muscles and connective tissue in the womb.

Contractures develop usually when normally elastic tissues such as muscles or tendons are replaced by inelastic tissues (fibrosis). This results in the shortening and hardening of these tissues, ultimately causing rigidity, joint deformities and a total loss of movement around the joint.

Most of the physical therapy, occupational therapy and other exercise regimens targeted towards people with spasticity focuses on trying to prevent contractures from happening in the first place. However, research on sustained traction of connective tissue in approaches such as adaptive yoga has demonstrated that contracture can be reduced at the same time that tendency toward spasticity is addressed.

== Causes of muscle contracture ==
Contractures can have a variety of causes other than spasticity. In regards to muscle, these include (but not limited to):

- Ischemia (restriction of blood flow) leading to the death of muscle tissue, as in Volkmann's contracture.
- Muscle injury leading to adhesions and fibrosis (internal scarring). Fibrosis occurs within a muscle or organ, whereas adhesions bind two separate tissues or organs together.
- Immobilization,
- A muscle imbalance between an agonist and antagonist muscle,
- In response to impending muscle damage associated with ATP (energy) deficiency,
- Congenital abnormalities of muscle development.

== Skin contracture ==
Wound contraction, where the edges of the skin are pulled together to close the wound, is a normal part of wound healing. However, large wounds and abnormal wound healing cause skin contractures by excessively tightening the skin and limiting movement. A skin contracture due to a burn is known as a burn scar contracture.

Large areas of missing skin (such as large burns, grazes, and gouges) drastically reduce the area of skin causing it to become tight when pulled together during wound healing. Scars initially lack elasticity with synthesis of elastic tissue fibres (elastogenesis) being a function of duration and site of the scar. Deep wounds and abnormal wound healing causes abnormal scarring such as hypertrophic scars. Studies on hypertrophic scars have shown a lack of improvement to both elasticity and stiffness suggesting a prolonged healing phase without amelioration seen in a normal wound-healing curve.

Surgery can help alleviate skin contractures in the form of skin grafts and removal of hypertrophic scars. For hypertrophic scars, timing is important when considering surgery, as over time scars will mature and may show decreased contractures along with flattening, softening, and repigmentation without surgical intervention.

== See also ==
- Arthrogryposis
- Burn scar contracture
- Capsular contracture
- Clubfoot
- Dupuytren's contracture
- Freeman–Sheldon syndrome
- Marden–Walker syndrome
- Muscle contracture
- Volkmann's contracture
