= Orthotropic =

Orthotropic may refer to:

- Orthotropic material is one that has different material properties or strengths in different orthogonal directions (e.g., glass-reinforced plastic, or wood)
- Orthotropic deck, in bridge design, is one made from solid steel plate
- Orthotropic movement, in botany, is a type of tropism along the same axis as the stimulus
- Orthotropics, a method claimed to be able to guide facial growth
