= Myology =

Study of the muscular system

Myology is the study of the muscular system, including the study of the structure, function and diseases of muscle. The muscular system consists of skeletal muscle, which contracts to move or position parts of the body (e.g., the bones that articulate at joints), smooth and cardiac muscle that propels, expels or controls the flow of fluids and contained substance.

== See also ==
- Myotomy – Surgical procedure to cut muscles
- Oral myology – Study of oral muscles
