= Burn scar contracture =

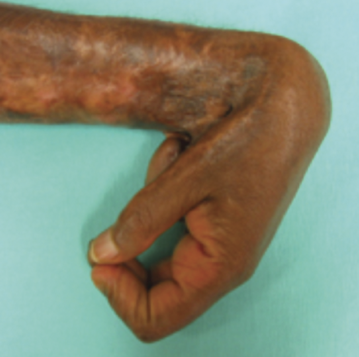
- Following burn injury, a patient shows severe joint contracture
- Specialty: Dermatology

Burn scar contracture is the tightening of the skin after a second or third degree burn. When skin is burned, the surrounding skin begins to pull together, resulting in a contracture. It needs to be treated as soon as possible because the scar can result in restriction of movement around the injured area. This is mediated by myofibroblasts.

== Treatment ==
The treatment of burn scar contracture and deformity begins upon hospitalization. Wound care and functional outcomes can be predicted from the initial assessment of wound depth and location. Epidermal and partial thickness wounds heal in 1 to 3 weeks through epithelial migration from the wound edges and epithelial budding from the appendages of the sweat and hair glands. These wounds pose only a small risk of contracture and hypertrophic scarring. Full-thickness (FT) injuries cause dermal wound healing, which is characterized by maturation (contraction and increased tensile strength), proliferation (collagen synthesis leading to wound closure), and inflammation (edema). FT wounds heal by excision and grafting, contracture, or epithelial ingrowths from the margins.

Because of insufficient tissue length and extensibility, severe damage to the integument system may result in significant impairment and disability. By using stress-strain curves, where stress is equal to force and strain is equal to tissue elongation, mechanical engineering principles can be used to assess the biomechanics of skin and scars. Stretching an adult burn scar is similar to stretching a tendon in terms of elasticity. On the other hand, persistent force applied to tissue will cause it to elongate, which will lead to a plastic change in length and an increase in range of motion. Fast and forceful stress is much less effective than a gentle, prolonged stretch that the patient can tolerate. By applying a mild, prolonged stress to the healing tissue at its longest length for at least 6 to 8 hours per day during the healing process, burn rehabilitation aims to prevent and treat scar contracture and deformity. Tolerable pain threshold and scar blanching are used to gauge the extent of treatment. The position of comfort becoming the position of contracture is one of the main treatment tenets, with an emphasis on range of motion first and strength training second. It is possible to protect healing wounds while preserving tissue length by using a variety of positioning and splinting techniques. Hypertrophic scarring is a common development in wounds that take longer than two or three weeks to heal. This frequently happens weeks after the wound was closed. If compression is applied as soon as the wound heals and is kept at a pressure of about 24 mm Hg, raised scarring can be avoided. A scar is deemed mature when it is avascular, flat, pliable, and soft, and immature if it is red, raised, and/or stiff. It can take six months to five years for scars to fully mature. The hands and face should receive particular attention in order to reduce the likelihood of long-term impairment and disability, as they are the body parts most frequently burned and have the highest rate of burn scar contracture.

== See also ==
- Keloid
- Hypertrophic scar
