= Hydradermabrasion =

Medical Procedure

- Specialty: Dermatology

Hydradermabrasion is a dermatological procedure which combines simultaneous dermal infusion of medicinal products and crystal-free exfoliation. Hydradermabrasion's mechanism of actions includes: (a) mechanical stimulation activates the basal layer, and (b) thickening and smoothing the epidermis. Fibroblast activity results in extracellular matrix deposition and dermal thickening. Antioxidants introduced through the procedure hydrate and decrease inflammation in the skin, reversing photo damage, while protecting lipid membranes, collagen fibers, and enzyme systems.

It is considered to be a relatively new procedure which combines microdermabrasion with the pneumatic application of antioxidant-based serums. The addition of polyphenolic antioxidants through hydradermabrasion to a phototherapy regimen enhanced the clinical, biochemical, and histological changes seen following phototherapy alone.

"Hydradermabrasion has the same indications for use as microdermabrasion, making it an excellent choice for persons with darker skin tones, aging skin, sensitive skin areas, oily, and dry skin complexions".A study on the efficacy of hydradermabrasion for facial rejuvenation was conducted comparing volunteers who received hydradermabrasion facial treatments using an antioxidant serum or who just received the same antioxidant serum manually applied to the skin. Skin treated with Hydradermabrasion demonstrated "significantly increased epidermal and papillary dermal thickness, and increased fibroblast density (p<0.01)”. A study on the efficacy of hydradermabrasion for facial rejuvenation was conducted comparing volunteers who received hydradermabrasion facial treatments using an antioxidant serum or who just received the same antioxidant serum manually applied to the skin. Six treatments were conducted on a 7- to 10-day interval to determine whether antioxidant levels could be increased in the skin and skin quality improved with this technique. Results of this study demonstrated that hydradermabraded skin possessed increased epidermal and papillary dermal thickness as well as greater antioxidant levels. Further histological examination saw a replacement of elastic dermal tissue, collagen hyalinization, and fibroblast density correlating with a decrease in the appearance of fine lines, pore size, and hyperpigmentation in hydradermabrasion treated areas 6 weeks post-treatment with no patient complications.
