= John Mew =

British orthodontist (1928–2025)

- Born: John Roland Chandley Mew; 7 September 1928; Royal Tunbridge Wells, Kent, England
- Died: 25 June 2025 (aged 96); Heathfield, East Sussex, England
- Known for: Orthotropics; Mewing
- Spouse: Josephine Rankine (m. 1964; died 2013)
- Children: 3

John Roland Chandley Mew (7 September 1928 – 25 June 2025) was a British orthodontist who was the founder of orthotropics and mewing. Orthotropics is a form of oral posture training that claims to guide facial growth and is not supported by professional orthodontists. (Note: Atrributed to multiple sources:)

== Early life and career ==
John Roland Chandley Mew was born in Royal Tunbridge Wells, Kent, England, on 7 September 1928. He began at University College London in 1948 and graduated with a degree in dentistry in 1953. He received a specialty degree in orthognathic surgery at Queen Victoria Hospital in East Grinstead in 1956. He became president of the Southern Counties Branch of the British Dental Association in 1971. He was a professor of orthotropics at the London School of Facial Orthotropics.

Mew held a two-year visiting professorship at Victor Babeș University of Medicine and Pharmacy in Timișoara, Romania. He was honoured with life membership of the British Dental Association in 1999.

== Orthotropics ==
Orthotropics is Mew's orthodontic method claimed to be able to guide facial growth. Mew's orthodontic methods consisted of widening and advancing the upper jaw using palatal expanders, changing the patient's diet, and having the patient adopt a myofunctionally correct resting place for the tongue, where he argued that it provides an outward force able to laterally expand the upper jaw in a growing child, and prevent downward and backward growth of the maxilla, gradually resulting in a 'natural' cure of the malocclusion.

Mew believed the cause of malocclusion is environmental and that environment decides whether or not teeth are crooked. In contrast, mainstream orthodontics attributes crooked teeth primarily to genetics.

Mew became concerned by the orthodontic outcomes of some of his patients. He concluded that the mechanics of orthodontic treatment, while straightening the teeth, did not address the underlying cause of the dental overcrowding and, in some cases, caused facial damage. He concluded that extractions, fixed appliances with elastics and retractive headgear could be harmful to facial growth. In 1958 Mew put forward The Tropic Premise, which argued that malocclusion was a 'postural deformity', that overcrowded teeth were not necessarily inherited and that, consequently, malocclusion could be avoided with early intervention to correct oral posture and function.

As part of his search for an approach to orthodontics that did not cause facial retraction, Mew visited Rolf Fränkel in East Germany in 1968, who introduced him to the work of Konstantin Buteyko. Mew went on to develop the concept of facial growth guidance, which he called Orthotropics, and the Biobloc system of treatment, involving the use of a palate-expanding appliance followed by a postural appliance. He practiced Orthotropics for 30 years and was involved in founding the International Association of Facial Growth Guidance in 1987 in Fort Worth, Texas.

=== Mewing ===
"Mewing" is a form of do-it-yourself oral posture training named after Mew and his son Michael Gordon Mew and is described most simply by Mew as "stand up straight and shut your mouth". Mewing grew in popularity, was shared on social media by influencers and received mainstream media coverage in 2019. This coverage included many tabloid papers and an interview with Michael on This Morning with Eamonn Holmes.

Although Mew's theory contains some plausible conclusions, there is inadequate evidence to support the efficacy of this treatment. Therefore, it is not considered a viable alternative treatment to orthognathic surgery.

== Controversy ==
Mew's views on the origin of and best treatment process for malocclusion met opposition from mainstream British orthodontists. Mew was fined by the NHS for providing inappropriate treatment. He appealed against the then–Minister of Health in the High Court in 1987, and Lord Justice Murray Stuart-Smith judged that "these very serious strictures were wholly unwarranted and perhaps go some way to justify the applicant's doubts as to the impartiality of the Dental Services Committee". He found in favour of Mew and awarded costs.

In 2010, the General Dental Council (GDC), a London-based organisation that regulates dental professionals in the United Kingdom, reprimanded Mew for running advertisements that it said contained misleading assertions. The GDC said Mew had "denigrated orthodontics and falsely alleged that the GDC had accepted the truth of Mr Mew's report". Mew characterized the investigation and reprimand as an effort to suppress his theories. Mew did not dispute the charge and referred to himself as a "whistleblower".

In 2017, Mew had his licence to practice revoked by the GDC, following claims of false advertising and breaching patient confidentiality.

Mew's son, Michael, has asserted that his father and his theories had been treated badly by the profession. In a unanimous decision around 2019, Michael was expelled from the British Orthodontic Society for continuing to advocate his positions. He launched a petition campaign to argue for a repeal of the decision. As of June 2024, he was still registered as an orthodontist with the GDC.

== Personal life and death ==
Mew married Josephine Ann Mew (née Rankine) in 1964. The couple had three children. Josephine died at St Wilfrid's Hospice in Eastbourne, East Sussex, on 18 July 2013.

Between 1957 and 1967, Mew was involved in motor racing, initially in Formula Three and later moving to Formula One. In 1963, he twice broke the Formula One club circuit record at Brands Hatch, beating times set by world champions Jim Clark, and John Surtees. In 1958, he was selected for the British Team for the first post-war challenge for the America's Cup, though he was subsequently unable to participate in the event itself. In 1971, he was selected to crew for John Prentice, captain for the British International 14 dinghy racing team in Annapolis, Maryland, where Britain came second. Mew and his crew Michael Moss took second place at an International 14 World Championships anniversary event. He also represented Great Britain in downhill skiing.

Between 1993 and 1999, Mew built Braylsham Castle, a moated castle in a valley in Sussex. The castle was featured on the Channel 4 television programme Britain's Best Home.

Mew died in his castle on 25 June 2025, aged 96.
