= Er:glass laser =

An Er:glass laser (erbium-doped glass laser) is a solid-state laser whose active laser medium is erbium-doped glass. Ytterbium (Yb) is sometimes added to these lasers to improve their efficiency. Er:glass lasers emit light in the infrared region of the electromagnetic spectrum, often in the range of 1530–1560 nanometers.

== Applications ==
The specific wavelengths that Er:glass produces (approximately 1500 nanometer) coincide with a strong absorption peak for water. Since the human cornea and lens contain a high water content, they effectively absorb the laser radiation, thereby reducing the amount of light transmitted to the retina. The retina is the light-sensitive layer of the eye and is particularly vulnerable to damage from high-powered lasers. Consequently, Er:glass lasers are classified as relatively eye-safe compared to lasers operating at wavelengths that reach the retina. This relative eye safety allows Er:glass lasers to be used in many different applications where eye safety is preferable or necessary, such as in medicine and in public areas.

=== Rangefinders ===
In addition to being relatively eye-safe, the 1500 nanometer wavelength that Er:glass lasers produce is also an ideal wavelength for laser rangefinders. It offers good transparency in the atmosphere, allowing the beam to travel long distances with minimal degradation. Additionally, this wavelength coincides with the peak sensitivity of certain infrared photodetectors that can operate at room temperature (including both indium gallium arsenide (InGaAs) and germanium (Ge)-based photodiodes).

The Er:glass lasers used in rangefinders typically emit short, high-energy pulses (Q-switched pulses) ranging from 1 to 10 millijoules. These lasers can measure distances up to 10 kilometers. The repetition rate, which refers to the frequency at which these pulses are emitted, depends on the pumping mechanism. Flash-lamp-pumped devices without active cooling can only produce pulses every few seconds. In contrast, diode-array pumped systems offer much faster repetition rates, reaching up to 10–20 hertz range.

=== Laser skin resurfacing ===
Er:glass lasers are used for non-ablative laser skin resurfacing procedures, such as Fraxel Restore. The 1540 nanometer wavelength is highly absorbed by water molecules within the skin tissue. This absorption heats the water molecules, creating controlled thermal damage (thermolysis) in the upper dermis. This thermal damage stimulates the skin's natural wound healing response, promoting the production of new collagen fibers. By stimulating collagen production, Er:glass laser treatment aims to improve the appearance of fine lines, wrinkles, and uneven skin tone without completely removing the top layers of skin. This approach is considered to be a gentler alternative to ablative laser resurfacing techniques, typically resulting in shorter healing times and a reduced risk of scarring.
