= Wound contracture =

Process during wound healing

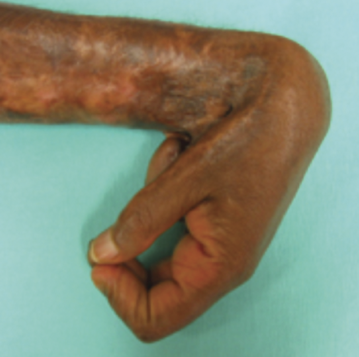
Wound contracture following deep burn injury

Wound contracture is a process that may occur during wound healing when an excess of wound contraction, a normal healing process, leads to physical deformity characterized by skin constriction and functional limitations. Wound contractures may be seen after serious burns and may occur on the palms, the soles, and the anterior thorax. For example, scars that prevent joints from extending or scars that cause an ectropion are considered wound contractures.

== See also ==
- Wound healing
- Burn scar contracture
