= Fraxel =

Medical treatment

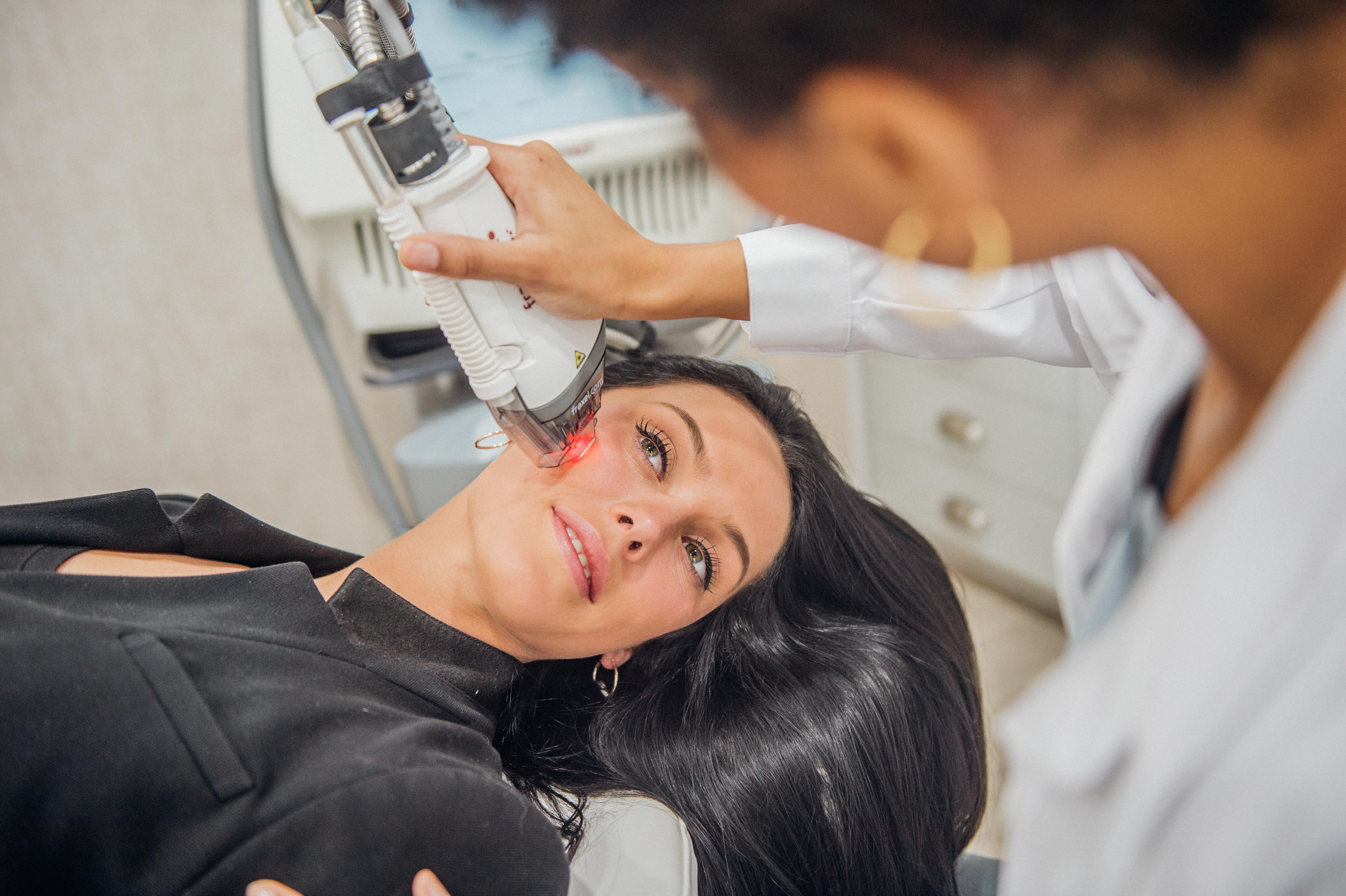
Doctor performs Fraxel laser procedure

Fraxel Laser Treatment is a line of lasers developed by Reliant Technologies in 2004. It was developed from a US patent licensed from the Wellman Center for Photomedicine. R. Rox Anderson was the inventor. Fraxel lasers cause fractional photothermolysis for skin resurfacing.

Complications observed in a study of 961 fractional laser treatments included acne and herpes outbreaks. There have also been anecdotal negative accounts of bad scarring and hyperpigmentation following the use of Fraxel lasers.

== Treatment purposes ==
Fraxel laser is used primarily to rejuvenate skin. It is used to treat hyperpigmentation, dark spots, and superficial signs of aging such as fine lines and wrinkles, as well as acne scarring.

== Types ==
Several variations of Fraxel lasers exist, each with distinct characteristics. These systems are distinguished by their laser types and the depth of tissue ablation they achieve.

- Fraxel Restore employs a 1,550nm erbium glass laser, which is categorized as a non-ablative laser, meaning it does not remove the outermost layer of skin. This characteristic positions it as the gentlest Fraxel laser and is used for improving skin texture, fine to moderate wrinkles, photoaging, and mild acne scaring.
- Fraxel Restore Dual incorporates a combination of a 1,550nm erbium glass laser and an ablative 1,927nm thulium fiber laser. It is commonly used to treat wrinkles, photoaging, surgical scars, and acne scars.
- Fraxel Repair uses an ablative 10,600nm-wavelength carbon-dioxide (CO_{2}) laser. This laser is the most aggressive among Fraxel lasers and is commonly used in treating wrinkles, especially those around the mouth or eyes.
