= Photorejuvenation =

Skin treatment

Photorejuvenation is a skin treatment that uses lasers, intense pulsed light, or photodynamic therapy to treat skin conditions and remove effects of photoaging such as wrinkles, spots, and textures. The process induces controlled wounds to the skin. This prompts the skin to heal itself, by creating new cells. This process—to a certain extent—removes the signs of photoaging. The technique was invented by Thomas L Roberts, III using CO_{2} lasers in the 1990s. Observed complications have included scarring, hyperpigmentation, acne, and herpes.

== Skin rejuvenation ==
Skin rejuvenation can be effected through various modalities, including thermal, chemical, mechanical, injection, and light.

== Laser resurfacing ==
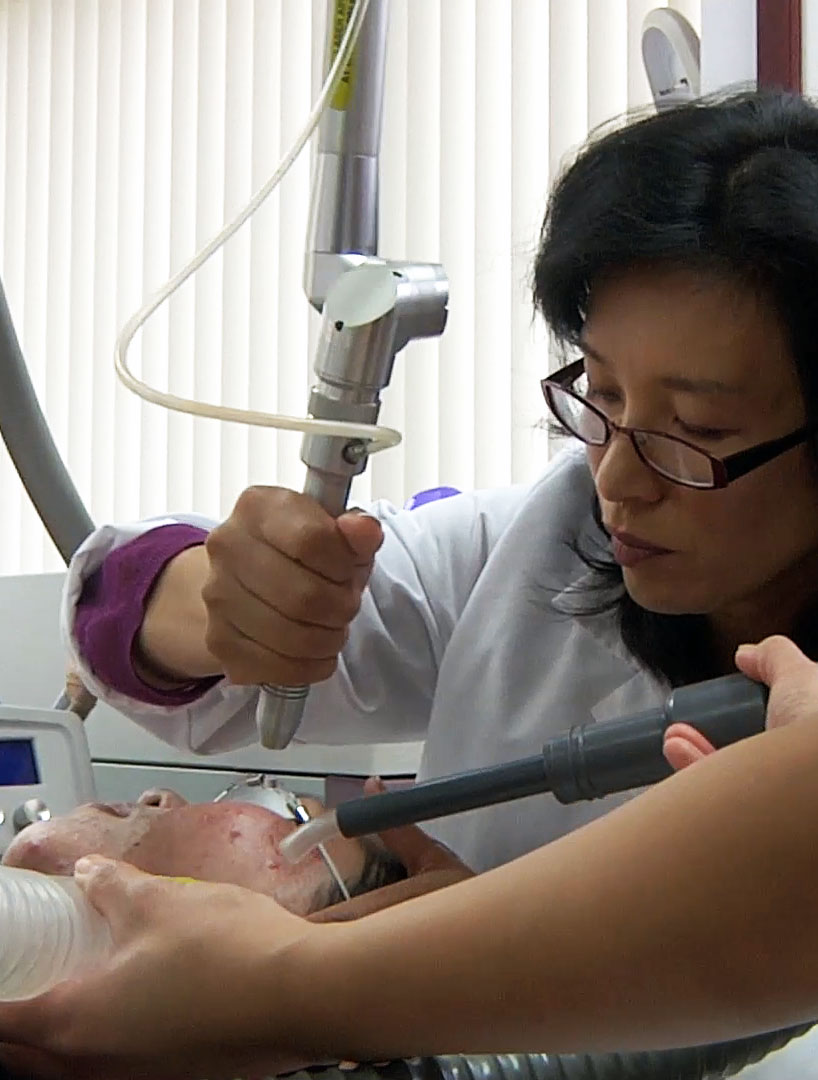
A physician performing laser resurfacing using an erbium laser

Laser resurfacing is a laser surgery technique that disassociates molecular bonds. It is used for the treatment of wrinkles, solar lentigenes, sun damage, scarring (acne scars and surgical scars), stretch marks, actinic keratosis, and telangiectasias. It can be combined with liposuction to help tighten and smooth over the new contours after removal of excess fat. Resurfacing can be ablative, which vaporizes tissue and creates wounds, or non-ablative which keeps the skin intact.

Laser resurfacing can be performed using non-ablative lasers, such as the 1540 nm Er:glass laser, or ablative lasers, such as the 2940 nm Er:YAG laser or the 10,600 nm CO_{2} laser Complete resurfacing was first done with a CO_{2} laser. Both erbium and CO_{2} are used to treat deep rhytides, sun damage and age spots. Through the heating of the deep dermis, fibroblasts are stimulated to form new collagen and elastin helping to bring increased turgor and thickness to the skin. A variety of modes have been developed including Nd:Yag lasers and a plasma device.

CO_{2} resurfacing has been shown to have an increased risk of hypopigmentation and scarring than erbium lasers. This is due to the high degree of coagulation and thus heat production that occurs as a nature of the CO_{2} wavelength.

=== Fractional laser ===
Fractional laser photothermolysis (FP) is a form of laser-based skin resurfacing, with several devices on the market, such as Fraxel. A fractional laser delivers laser light to the skin. Hundreds or thousands of laser pinpoints may be used per square inch, leaving healthy skin between the ablated areas.

Complications observed in a study of 961 treatments included acne and herpes outbreaks. There have been anecdotal negative accounts of bad scarring and hyperpigmentation.

Erbium and CO_{2} fractional systems have a better safety profile than lasers of the past.

== Intense pulsed light ==
Intense Pulsed Light (IPL) uses flashlamps (and not lasers) to produce high intensity light over broad visible and infrared wavelengths with filters that select the desired range. IPL is used to treat dyschromia, rosacea, melasma, acne, photodamage, vascular and pigmented lesions, and rhytides.

One study conducted by a group of four researchers from the Weill Cornell Medical College of Cornell University in 2004 found IPL to be a "non-invasive, non-ablative method for rejuvenating photoaged skin with minimal adverse events".

Other studies, however, have noted that exposing cells to direct heat can cause DNA damage—not only in those cells, but also in surrounding tissue that was not directly exposed, and concluded treatments can cause microscopic thermal injuries, and that further research is warranted.

IPL is effective for pigmentation and telangiectasias, but has lesser results for wrinkles.

== Photodynamic therapy ==
Photodynamic therapy (PDT) uses photosensitive compounds that are activated by light. It is used to treat actinic keratoses, acne, photoaging, and skin cancer.

== See also ==
- Laser surgery
