= Silicone gel sheeting =

Scar treatment therapy

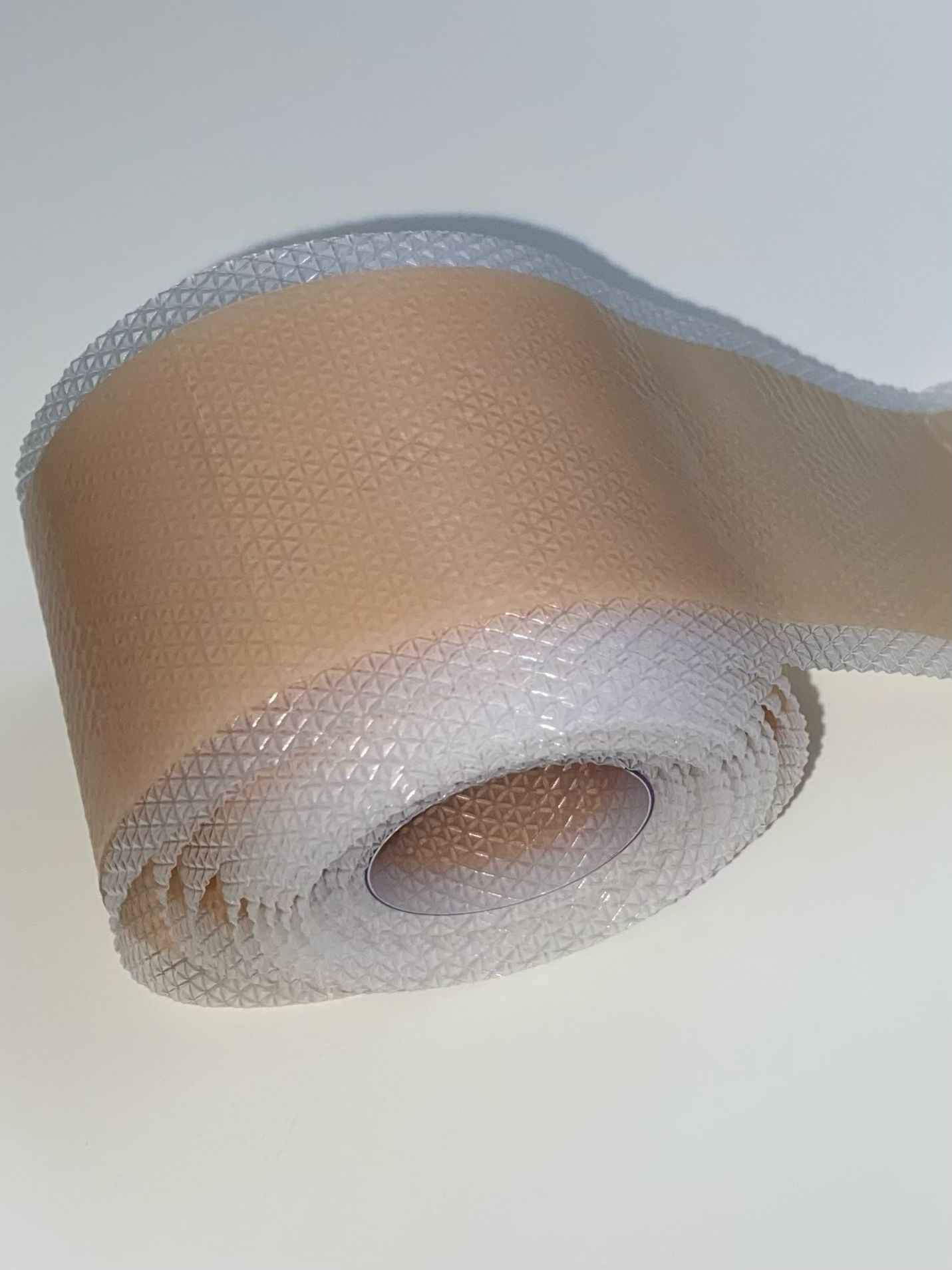
Silicone gel sheet (beige)

Silicone gel sheeting (SGS) has been an effective reductive and preventive scar therapy since 1980. It was first discovered to be used in treating scars by Perkins in Australia and New Zealand, and first discussed in the thesis of Karen Quinn, a British biomedical engineering student, in 1985.

It is now considered the first-line prevention and treatment for hypertrophic and keloid scars by occlusion and then hydration of the scar tissue. Silicone gel is made of medical-grade silicone polymers. Silicone gel sheet consists of a soft, semi-occlusive sheet and a membrane that increases the durability of the sheet. The sheet has a solid rubber-like appearance.

Although the mechanism of action of silicone gel sheeting remains partially unknown, its efficacy is confirmed by many clinical trials, and is similar to silicone gel.

== Medical use ==
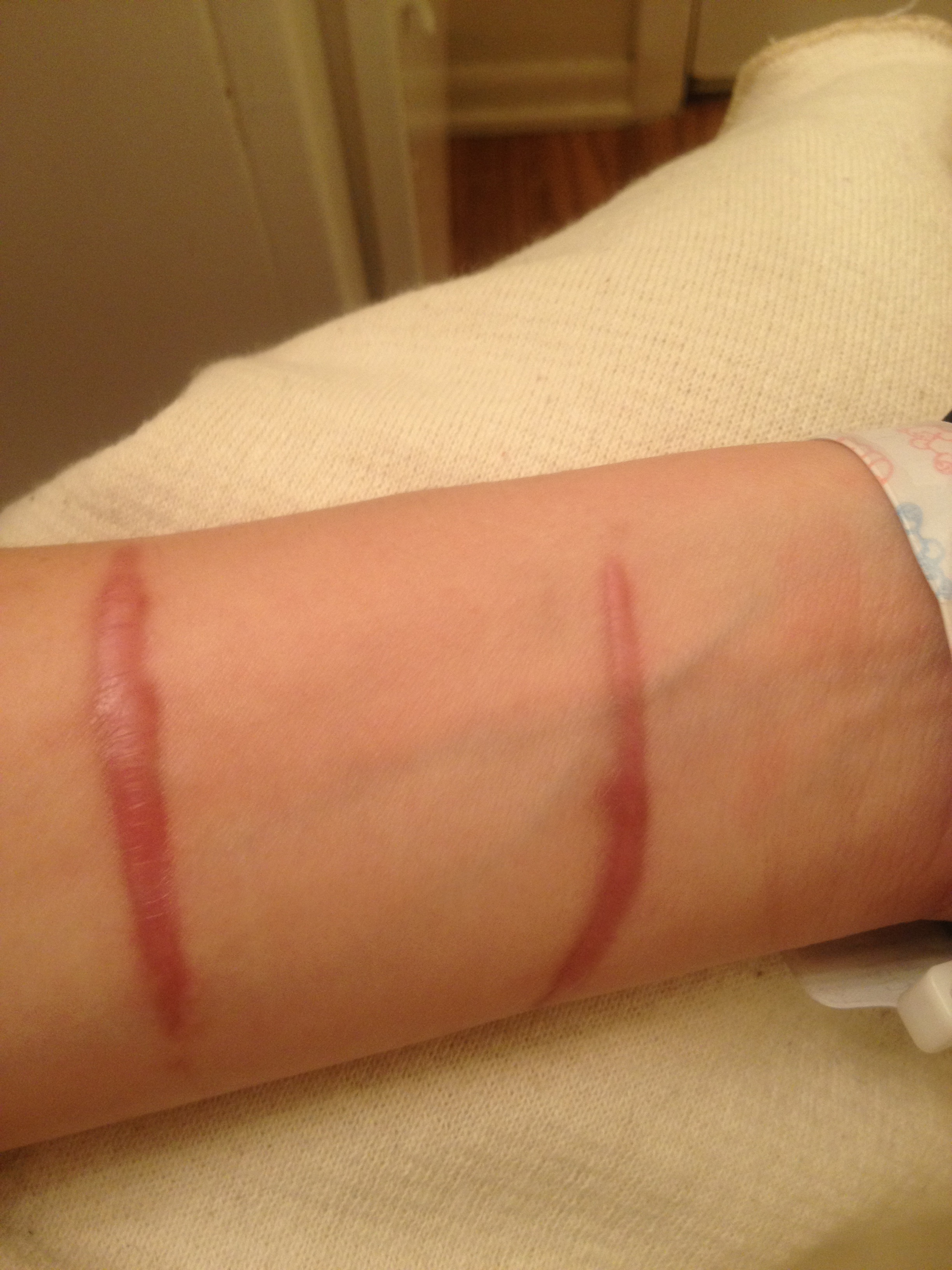
Hypertrophic scar

Silicone gel sheeting is the gold-standard and non-invasive treatment for hypertrophic and keloid scars. During skin injury repair, dermal cells proliferate and migrate from the skin tissue to the wound, producing collagen and causing contraction of the placement dermis. These scars are proliferative due to chronic inflammation and overproduction of abnormal collagen. Common clinical presentations of these scars are raised, thickened, red, or dark-colored. Patients may also experience pain and itching.

Hypertrophic scars are elevated scars that remain in the region of the original lesion following mechanical traumas, burns, and necrotizing infections. These scars typically develop in locations under tension, such as shoulders, ankles, knees, and the neck. Hypertrophic scars are generally confined to the boundaries of the original wound and tend to diminish over time.

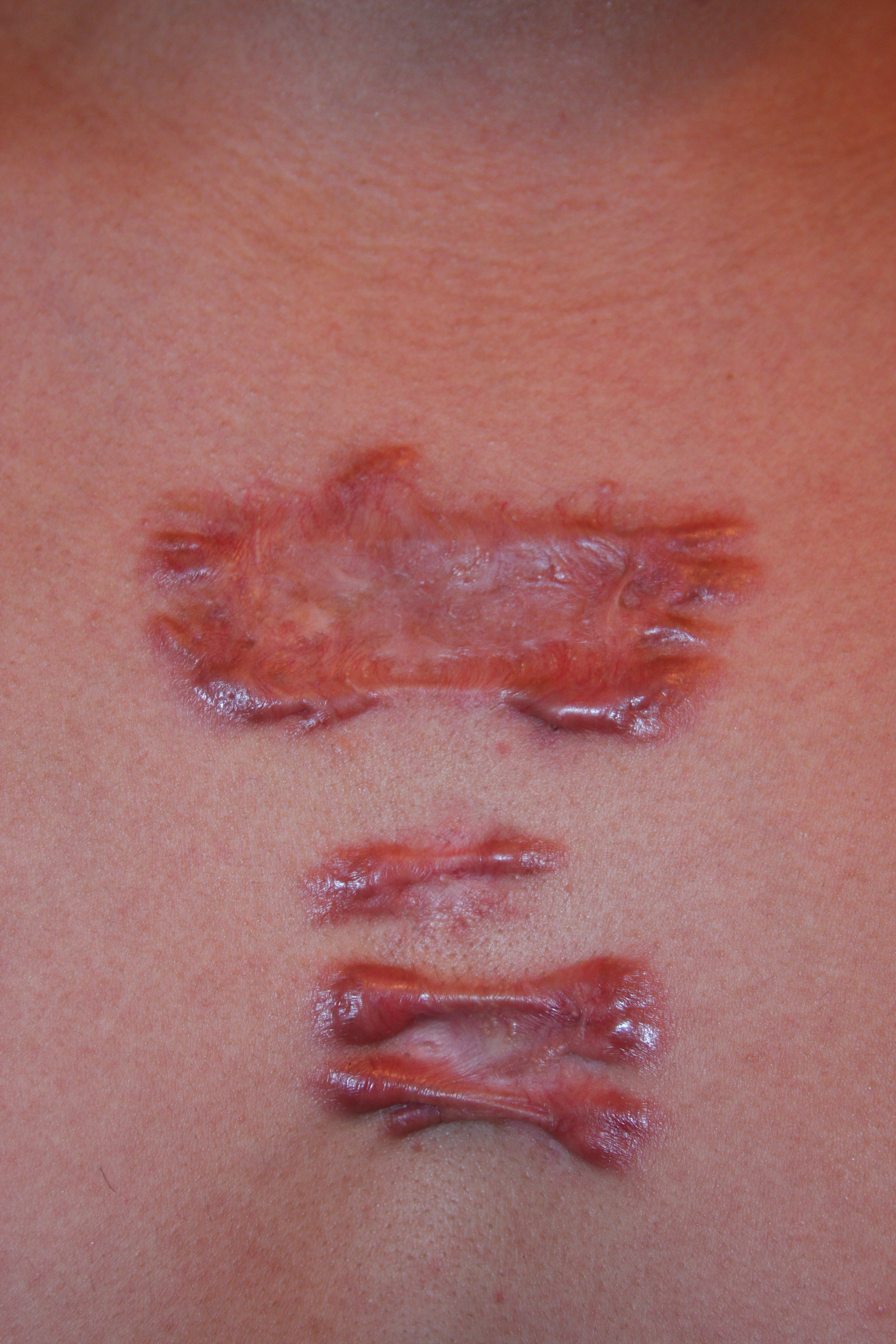
Keloids

Keloids grow extensively beyond the wound margins and tend to persist or even worsen over time. They are relatively difficult to treat due to their high risk of recurrence. Keloids are more common in people with darker skin tones and often occur in individuals with a genetic predisposition. Keloids are the most extreme type of scarring since minor wounds such as insect bites or piercings can all lead to an elevated tissue area. Patients may experience psychological trauma if their scars are not well-controlled. Therefore, the prevention of wound formation is crucial to them. They should avoid undergoing any unnecessary invasive procedures or cosmetic surgeries.

The beneficial effects of silicone gel sheeting on the treatment and prevention of these two scars have been confirmed. Since most patients develop hypertrophic and keloid scars within 3 months after surgery or injury, the silicone gel sheeting therapy should be started in the early repair phase to achieve an optimal therapeutic effect. The maturity of scars takes over a year; therefore, silicone treatment is also effective in scars aged over 12 months. The therapy usually requires 6 to 12 months of constant wear to achieve optimum results. Recent data suggest that the combination of silicone gel sheeting and pressure therapy can improve post-traumatic scar healing.

== Use ==
The sheet should not be used on open wounds. The sheet is reusable with proper cleaning though it should be replaced when it starts to deteriorate.

== Mechanism of action ==
The exact mechanism of action of silicone gel sheeting has not been fully studied. Currently, many proposed mechanisms explain the efficacy of such treatment, including the occlusion and hydration effect, increased body surface temperature, polarized electric charge, immunological effects, etc. The occlusion and hydration effect is the most studied mechanism of action.

=== Occlusion and hydration ===
Silicone gel sheets occlude and hydrate the stratum corneum of the treated skin area. The stratum corneum normally conserves water and acts as a barrier to microbial infection. Its function can be disrupted by wound formation. The stratum corneum of hypertrophic scars and keloids absorbs more water than normal skin, depleting the water supply from the stratum corneum. Excessive dehydration of keratinocytes stimulates cytokine production, leading to increased collagen production. After applying the sheet, the rate of water loss via evaporation of the treated skin area is half of the untreated area. Therefore, the sheet prevents the drying up of stratum corneum, and thus further collagen production. Collagen production exacerbates the growth of hypertrophic scars and keloids and thus should be avoided. Hydrating a scar over a prolonged period can also relieve symptoms such as itching and pain. Such an effect is likely due to decreased capillary activity and thus local collagen deposition.

=== Temperature ===
Applying silicone gel sheeting causes a slight increase in surface temperature. Increased temperature intensifies the activity of collagenase, an enzyme that breaks down collagen. Since excessive collagen production leads to scar formation, increased levels of collagenase may help reduce the risk of scar formation.

=== Epidermal-dermal signaling ===
Silicone-related products can reduce the growth factor production of fibroblasts in hypertrophic scars and keloids. However, the relevance is unclear as silicone products do not have direct contact with dermal fibroblasts but with the epidermis only. Possible relevance may be due to the initiation of a signaling cascade by the epidermis. Through the signaling cascade, the epidermis regulates dermal fibroblast extracellular matrix production. Delayed epithelialization, which raises the risk of hypertrophic scar formation, is less likely to happen.

A negative static electric charge is formed by friction between the silicone gel sheet and the skin. The charge induces collagen realignment, aiding the elimination of the scar. Moreover, the negative electric field leads to the polarization of scar tissues and thus scar shrinkage.

== Effectiveness ==
Silicone gel sheeting has remained the first-line therapy stated by international clinical recommendations on scar management.

Scar measurements studied in most clinical trials include color (vascularisation and pigmentation), thickness (height: clinical and histological), relief (surface irregularities), pliability (tissue elasticity), and surface area (scar contraction or expansion).

Scar elevation index is commonly used to indicate scar improvement. It measures the height of scar tissue compared to the normal surrounding skin. Studies show the effectiveness of silicone gel sheeting in minimizing scar elevation index. Another physical measure is the pliability of the scar tissue, which is also improved by silicone gel sheeting. Scar improvement is generally measured by size reduction, appearance, and calming effect. Silicone gel sheeting addresses the 3 requirements well among scar treatments. Several randomized controlled trials were carried out to assess the effectiveness. Silicone gel sheeting produces a statistically significant reduction in scar thickness and color amelioration. Therefore, it is an evidence-based non-invasive preventive treatment.

Results of comparative studies on the effectiveness of silicone gel sheeting and silicone gel do not show significant differences between the two.

Another non-invasive treatment is compression therapy, in which patients wear pressure garments to control the growth of scars. Pressure garments apply mechanical pressure to the surface of the scar, reducing the supply of blood and oxygen to the scar tissue. Formation of excessive scar tissue is thus prevented. The combination of silicone gel sheeting and compression therapy has been proven to be more effective than using the sheet alone.

Patients who find the non-invasive treatments ineffective may choose to undergo invasive treatments such as intralesional injections of corticosteroids, surgical excision of the scars, and radiotherapy.

== Side effects ==
Common side effects of silicone gel sheets include itchiness, rash, maceration of the skin, and malodor. These symptoms are generally well-tolerated and can be minimized by rinsing the area properly daily. Patients who suffer from these side effects should wash the treated area and the silicone gel sheets with mild soap since the dirt or bacteria on the sheets may irritate the scar. In tropical climates with high humidity, excessive moisture underneath the gel may lead to heat rash and uncomfortable sensations in patients.

== Design ==
Silicone gel sheets are usually made of medical silicone polymers such as polysiloxane and polydimethylsiloxane, along with silicon dioxide and volatile components. The long-chain silicone polymers form cross-linking with silicon dioxide and spread as a thin sheet.

They are either flesh color (most common) or clear and come as either a single large rectangle sheet or a roll. Available size varies with brands.

== Notable brands ==
- Advasil Conform: Polyurethane film backing and self-adhesive
- Bapscarcare T: Self-adhesive
- Cica-care: Soft, self-adhesive, and semi-occlusive with backing
- Ciltech: Polyurethane film backing and self-adhesive
- Dermatix: Self-adhesive (transparent or fabric-backed)
- Mepiform: Polyurethane film backing and self-adhesive
- Myscar: Medical grade silicone
- Scar FX: Self-adhesive and transparent
- Silgel: Thin and transparent
- Scarcura: Self-adhesive, soft
