= Facial toning =

Type of physical therapy

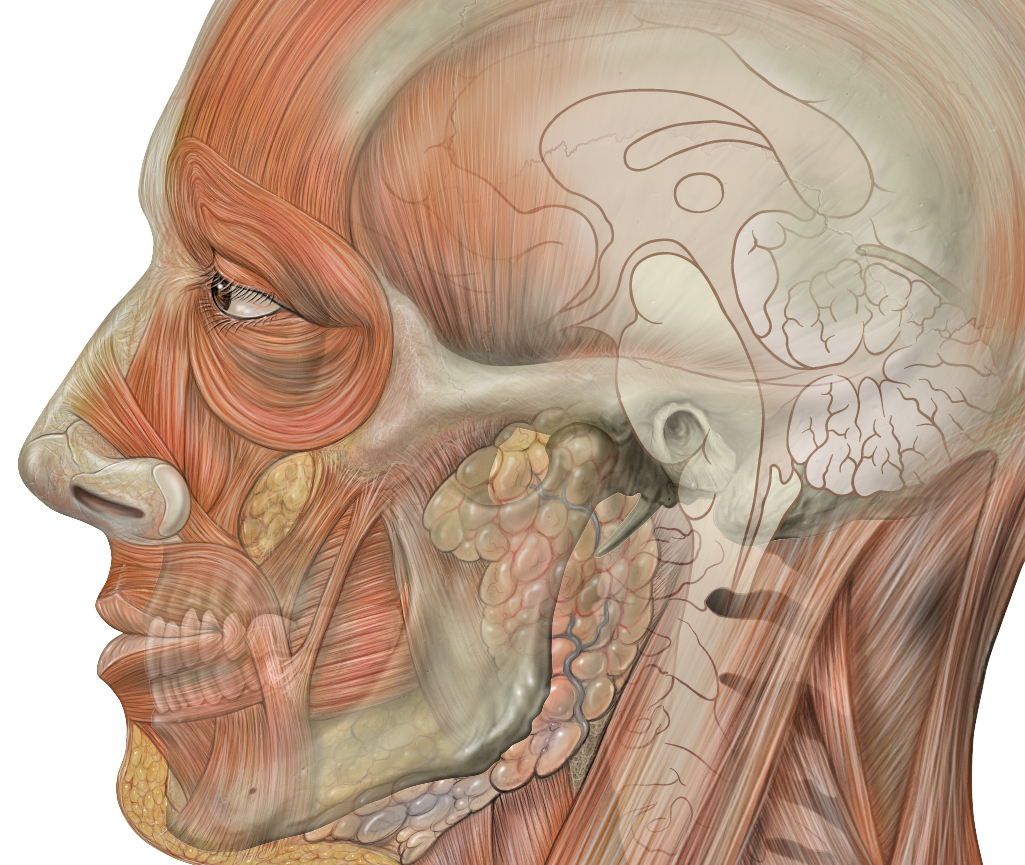
Facial muscles

Facial toning, or facial exercise, is a type of cosmetic procedure or physical therapy tool which alters facial contours by means of increasing muscle tone and facial volume by promoting muscular hypertrophy, and preventing muscle loss due to aging or facial paralysis. Facial toning and exercise is therefore in part a technique to achieve facial rejuvenation by reducing wrinkles, sagging, and expression marks on the face and skin. As a physical therapy, facial toning is used for victims of stroke and forms of facial paralysis such as Bell's palsy. Facial toning achieves this by performing facial muscle exercising. There are two types of facial toning exercises: active and passive face exercises.

== Exercises ==
Face exercises involve repeated voluntary contractions of certain facial muscle groups. The effectiveness of these facial toning techniques has preliminary scientific support. One study has shown significant improvement in cheek fullness for middle-aged women, although no control group was included.

Due to the rising rate of sedentary lifestyles and stressors related to inflammation and aging in many parts of the world, facial toning exercises focus on stimulating the muscles, skin, and lymphatic systems, with the belief that strengthening specific muscle groups can help tighten and plump the outer layer of skin. Most facial toning exercises encompass long-term lifestyle strategies that promote ongoing skincare and exercise.

== Passive exercises ==
Passive exercising by direct skeletal muscle electrostimulation. In this, flat metal electrodes with a conductive gel are affixed to certain points in the face and electrostimulation causes facial muscle contractions.

== See also ==
- Oral myology – Study of oral muscles
