= Hypertrophic scar =

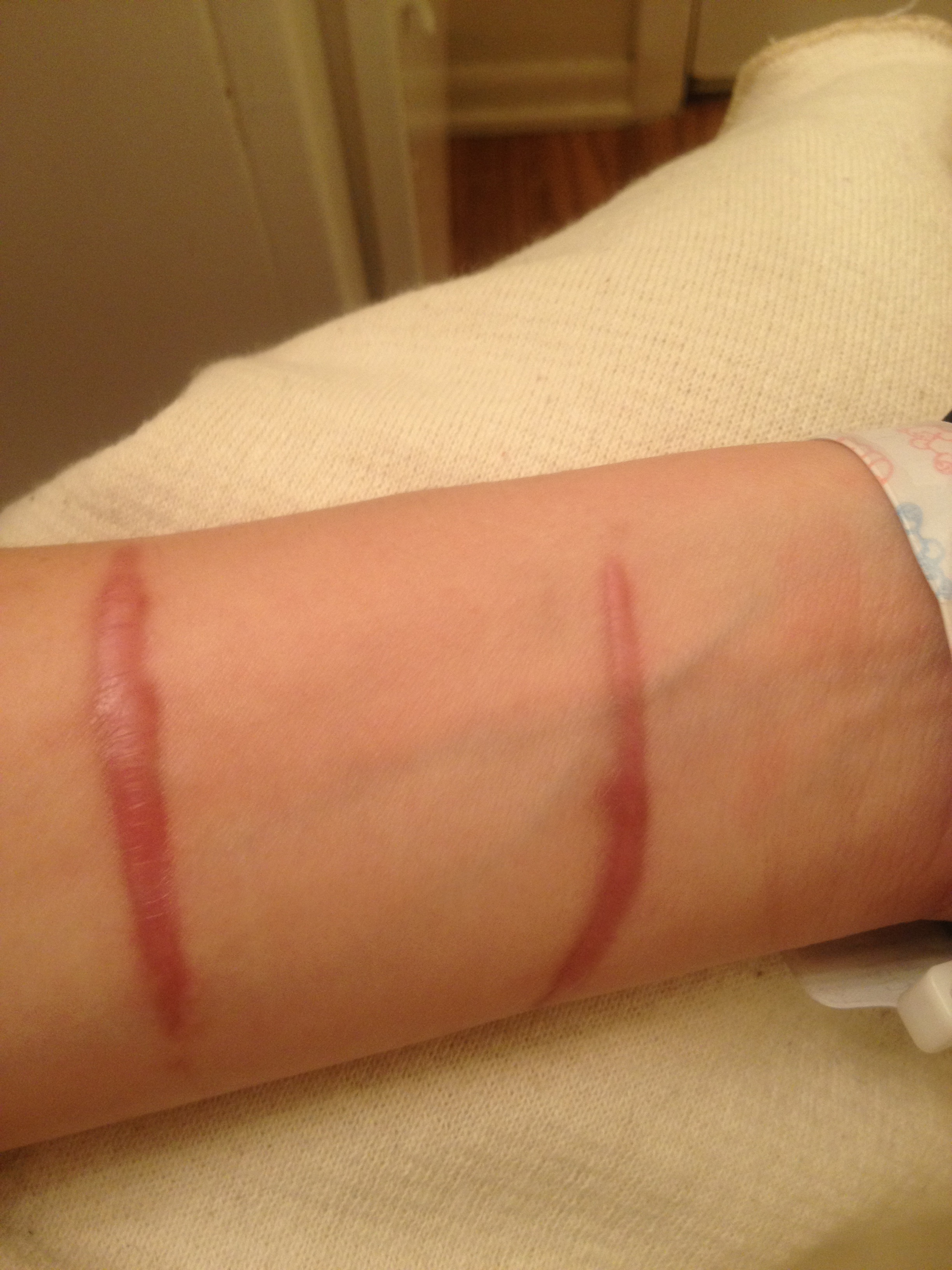
- Hypertrophic scar (4 months after incident)
- Specialty: Dermatology

A hypertrophic scar is a cutaneous condition characterized by deposits of excessive amounts of collagen that create a raised scar, but not to the degree observed with keloids. Like keloids, they form most often at the sites of pimples, body piercings, cuts and burns. They often contain nerves and blood vessels. Hypertrophic scars generally develop after thermal or traumatic injury that involves the deep layers of the dermis and express high levels of TGF-β.

== Cause ==
Mechanical tension on a wound has been identified as a leading cause of hypertrophic scar formation. (Note: Yagmur C, Akaishi S, Ogawa R, Guneren E (August 2010). "Mechanical receptor-related mechanisms in scar management: a review and hypothesis". Plastic and Reconstructive Surgery. 126 (2): 426–434. doi:10.1097/PRS.0b013e3181df715d. PMID 20375759. S2CID 23828914. cited in Acute Burn Care (2012) page 332.)

When a normal wound heals, the body produces new collagen fibers at a rate that balances the breakdown of old collagen. Hypertrophic scars are thick, red to brown in coloration, and may be itchy or painful. They do not extend beyond the boundary of the original wound but may continue to rise or thicken for up to six months. Hypertrophic scars usually heal and fade over one to two years. Hypertrophic scars may cause distress due to their appearance or the intensity of itchiness. They can also restrict movement if located close to a joint.

Some people, such those with Ehlers–Danlos syndrome, may have an inherited tendency to develop hypertrophic scarring.

== Prevention ==
It is not possible to completely prevent hypertrophic scars, so those with a history of them should inform their doctor or surgeon if they need surgery. Pressure garment therapy is a commonly used approach to try to prevent hypertrophic scarring after a burn, but the effectiveness of this approach is unclear.

== Management ==
Early hypertrophic scars should be treated by applying pressure or massage during the first 1.5–3 months. If necessary, silicone therapy should be applied later. Ongoing hypertrophy may be treated with corticosteroid injections. Surgical revision may be considered after 1 year.

=== Silicone gel sheeting ===
Silicone gel sheeting is sometimes used to treat hypertrophic scars. Silicone gel sheets may improve the appearance of scars slightly compared with applying onion extract and may reduce pain compared with no treatment with silicone gel sheets or pressure garments. It is uncertain whether silicone gel sheets are more effective than other treatment methods.

=== Laser therapy ===
Laser therapy is an approach that has been studied for treating hypertrophic scars. There is not enough evidence to determine if laser therapy is more effective than other treatments, or if laser therapy leads to more harm than benefit as compared to no treatment or different treatment.

=== Cryosurgery ===
Cryosurgery, using extreme cold to remove dead tissue, may speed up the healing process of a hypertrophic scar to a flatter, paler appearance.

== See also ==
- List of cutaneous conditions
