= Dermabrasion =

Surgical planing of skin layers

- Specialty: Dermatology
- MeSH: D003869
- MedlinePlus: 002987

Dermabrasion is a type of surgical skin planing, generally with the goal of removing acne scarring and other skin or tissue irregularities, typically performed in a professional medical setting by a dermatologist or plastic surgeon trained specifically in this procedure. Dermabrasion has been practiced for many years (before the advent of lasers) and involves the controlled deeper abrasion (wearing away) of the upper to mid layers of the skin with any variety of strong abrasive devices including a wire brush, diamond wheel or fraise, sterilized sandpaper, salt crystals or other mechanical means.

Dermabrasion procedures are surgical, invasive procedures that typically require a local anaesthetic. Often, they are performed in surgical suites or in professional medical centers. Since the procedure can typically remove the top to deeper layers of the epidermis and extend into the reticular dermis, there is always minor skin bleeding. The procedure carries risks of scarring, skin discoloration, infections and facial herpes virus (cold sore) reactivation. In aggressive dermabrasion cases, there is often tremendous skin bleeding and spray during the procedure that has to be controlled with pressure. Afterward, the skin is normally very red and raw-looking. Depending on the level of skin removal with dermabrasion, it takes an average of 7–30 days for the skin to fully heal (re-epithelialize). Often, the procedure is performed for deeper acne scarring and deep surgical scars. Dermabrasion is currently rarely practiced and there are very few doctors who are trained and still perform this surgery. Dermabrasion has largely been replaced by technologies including lasers, CO_{2} or Erbium:YAG laser. Laser technologies carry the advantage of little to no bleeding and are often less operator dependent than dermabrasion.

The purpose of surgical dermabrasion is to help diminish the appearance of deeper scars and skin imperfections. Often, the goal is to smooth the skin and, in the process, remove small scars (as from acne), uneven skin tone from scars or birthmarks, sun damage, tattoos, age spots, or fine wrinkles.

Dermabrasion is a mechanical surgical skin planing method which has remained popular partially because it may afford an overall lower cost and may provide similar or superior results as newer laser methods for certain skin conditions.

== Microdermabrasion ==
Microdermabrasion is a light cosmetic procedure that uses a mechanical medium for exfoliation to remove the outermost layer of dead skin cells from the epidermis. Most commonly, microdermabrasion uses two parts: an exfoliating material such as crystals or diamond flakes, and a machine-based suction to gently lift up the skin during exfoliation. It is a non-invasive procedure and may be performed in-office by a trained skin care professional. It may also be performed at home using a variety of products which are designed to mechanically exfoliate the skin. Many salon machines and home-use machines use adjustable suction to improve the efficacy of the abrasion tool.

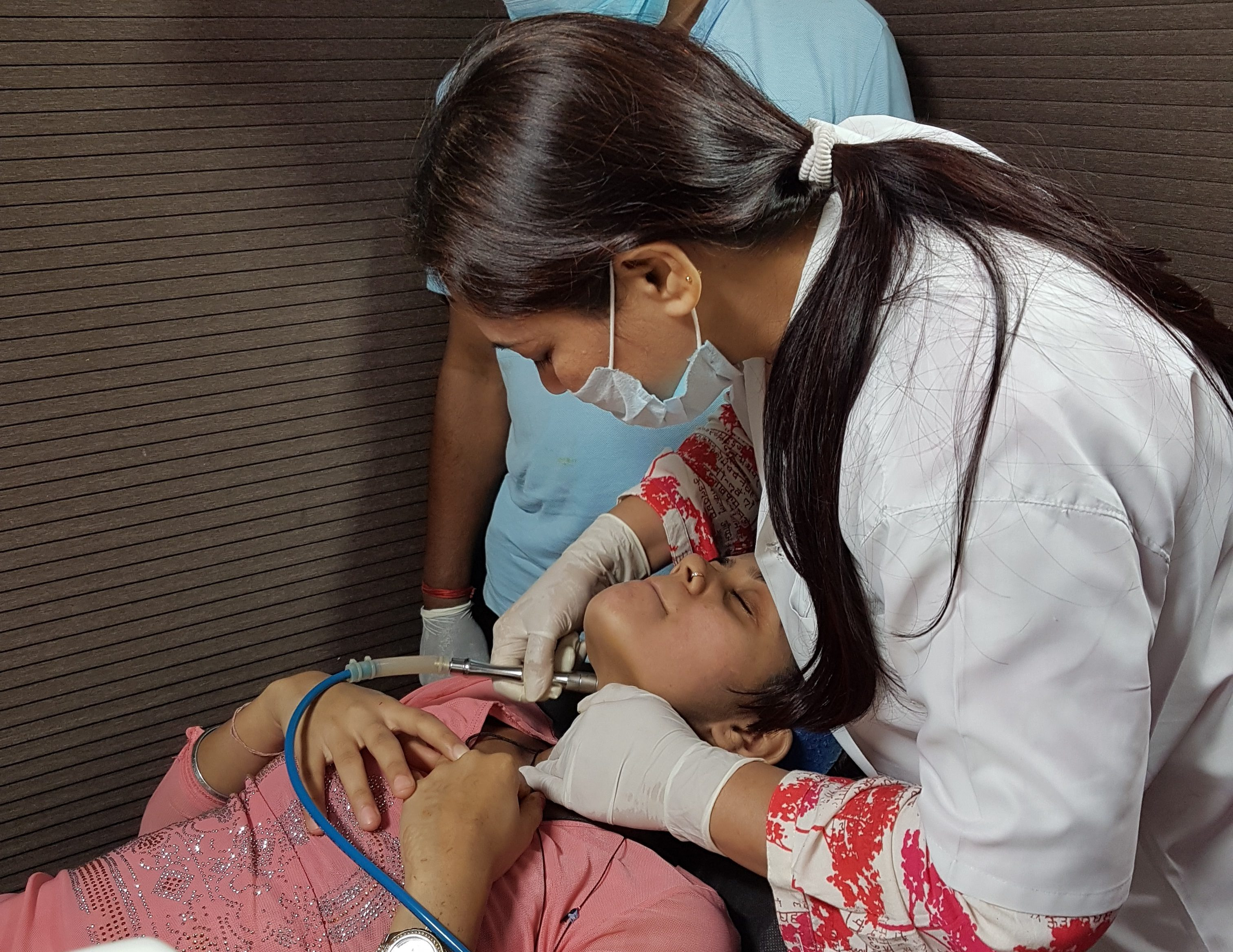
A doctor performing Microdermabrasion cosmetic skin procedure for removal of dead skin, also known as skin polishing.

Microdermabrasion is considered a relatively simple, easy, painless and non-invasive skin rejuvenation procedure. Typically there are no needles or anesthetics required for microdermabrasion. The vacuum pressure and speed are adjusted depending on the sensitivity and tolerance of the skin. Typical microdermabrasion sessions can last anywhere from 5 to 60 minutes. Minimal to no recovery time is required after microdermabrasion and most people immediately return to daily activity after a session. Makeup and non-irritating creams can usually be applied within a few hours or right after microdermabrasion. Since there is an often immediate increased minor skin sensitivity after microdermabrasion, irritating products such as glycolic acids, Alpha Hydroxy Acids, Retinoid products or fragranced creams and lotions are typically avoided right after the procedure.

Traditionally, a "crystal" microdermabrasion system includes a pump, a connecting tube, a hand piece, and a vacuum. While the pump creates a high-pressure stream of inert crystals (aluminum oxide, magnesium oxide, sodium chloride, or sodium bicarbonate) to abrade the skin, the vacuum removes the crystals and exfoliated skin cells. Alternatively, the inert crystals can be replaced by a roughened surface of the tip in the diamond microdermabrasion system.

Unlike the older crystal microdermabrasion system, the diamond microdermabrasion does not produce particles from crystals that may be inhaled into patients' nose or blown into the eyes. Hence, diamond microdermabrasion is regarded as having higher safety for use on areas around the eyes and lips. Generally, the slower the movement of the microdermabrasion handpiece against the skin and the greater the numbers of passes over the skin, the deeper the skin treatment.

One of the safest methods of microdermabrasion involves the use of corundum or aluminum oxide crystals suspended in an antioxidant cream. This version of microdermabrasion is generally the most cost efficient as it involves the use of a small handheld skincare tool instead of expensive equipment used by a salon. This method of microdermabrasion rose to popularity in the early 2000s and is widely available today.

Often called "microderm" for short, microdermabrasion is a procedure to help exfoliate or temporarily remove a few of the top layers of the skin called the stratum corneum. Much like brushing one's teeth, microdermabrasion helps to gently remove skin "plaque" and skin debris. Since human skin typically regenerates at approximately 30-day intervals, skin improvement with microdermabrasion is temporary and needs to be repeated at average intervals of two to four weeks for continued improvement. Multiple treatments in combination with sunscreen, sun avoidance and skin care creams yield best results.

Dermabrasion is generally used to refer to a true surgical procedure that aggressively abrades away the top to mid layers of the skin. The term microdermabrasion generally refers to a non-surgical procedure that abrades less deeply than dermabrasion. Although the mechanism of the two procedures is similar, the difference in the depth of the abrasion results in different recovery times. Dermabrasion recovery time may take as much as several weeks to several months whereas microdermabrasion recovery time may be as little as one to two days. After microdermabrasion, skin will be much more sensitive to sun exposure. It is best to keep out of the sun and wear sunscreen at all times after the procedure.

Microdermabrasion may be performed to help diminish the appearance of superficial hyperpigmentation or photo-damage (sunburn), as well as diminish fine lines, wrinkles, acne and shallow acne scars. A further benefit of microdermabrasion is enhanced skin penetration by skin creams and serums. Removing dead skin (stratum corneum of the epidermis) will aid in the penetration of skin care products and medications by up to 10-50%. The controlled skin exfoliation afforded by microdermabrasion will allow make-up and self-tanning products to go on much more smoothly.

Microdermabrasion treatment carries minimal to very few possible side effects or complications. However, some patients may experience temporary mild dryness, sun sensitivity and rarely temporary bruising or scratches in the area of skin treated.

=== Microdermabrasion units ===
The first microdermabrasion unit was developed in Italy in 1985, using small inert aluminium oxide crystals to abrade the skin. In 1986, other European markets had introduced the technology which was immediately adopted by physicians for mechanical exfoliation. There were 10 microdermabrasion units on the market in Europe by the end of 1992. In 1996, Mattioli Engineering partnered with one of the Italian designed machines and started working towards meeting FDA requirements for the USA. By the end of 1996, the Food and Drug Administration| (FDA) issued the first approval letter for microdermabrasion machines. In January 1997, the first microderm machine was being sold and marketed in the US. The diamond tip was introduced in 1999 and the bristle tip brush was introduced in 2005. The first standard vacuum based microdermabrasion system called Vacubrasion was introduced in 2012 in the US and world markets, and provides diamond tip exfoliation and suction. Vacubrasion's patented air regulator delivery system was designed and underwent extensive testing by US dermatologists and physicians. Its straightforward design revolutionized microdermabrasion to permit use of almost any type of suction source (primarily retail brand vacuums with a 1.25 in (31.8 mm) standard round hose such as Eureka, Stanley vacuums) with a non-disposable, attached electroplated fine diamond abrasive tip. While traditional, older crystal based microdermabrasion and home microdermabrasion systems are sometimes fraught with clogging issues and potential loss of suction, the crystal-free Vacubrasion systems utilize a universal, larger and more powerful suction source that avoids many of these issues.

=== Abrasive material ===
Microdermabrasion has evolved from rocks, stones and shells to crystals, particle-free diamond tips and particle-free bristle tips. Once the desired amount of exfoliation has been reached, some microdermabrasion units will then spray or infuse a skin enhancing solution into the skin. Since microderm essentially manually removes limited layers of the stratum corneum (dead layers of the outer layer of the skin), any serum or topical product applied in any fashion to the skin following microdermabrasion will potentially have a greater opportunity for penetration into the skin.

Microdermabrasion crystals are typically made of a very fine, abrasive material like aluminum oxide. Other inert microderm crystals include magnesium oxide, sodium chloride, and sodium bicarbonate. All ultra-fine white crystals are disposable and should be discarded after each use. The microdermabrasion vacuum removes the crystals and exfoliated skin cells. Inhalation of crystals should be avoided and masks are sometimes worn by the operator doing the treatment. Ocular injury may occur if crystals are inadvertently sprayed in the eye or if crystals remain around the eye and cause a corneal abrasion. There are some possible concerns of inhalation exposure and basic safety precautions should be taken. Patient goggles or eye shields, as well as operator face masks are recommended when treating with crystal based systems. Alternatively, microderm crystals can be safely replaced by the roughened surface of a diamond tip microdermabrasion system. The newer diamond based systems like Vacubrasion utilize a fine diamond dust that is essentially electroplated onto a stainless steel round tip that comes in contact with the skin.

==== Microdermabrasion media ====
- Aluminium oxide crystals: 100 micrometres; aluminium oxide is relatively chemically inert and generally recognized as safe.
- Bristle tips: bristles are pliable, so they move with the skin allowing for aggressive treatments without added irritation.
- Diamond tips: can be natural but usually synthetic for lower costs; erythema (Redness) is partially due to circulation rather than only irritation.
- Liquid (hydradermabrasion): water-based sprays in combination with a rough plastic tip spray liquid against the skin to help gently exfoliate.
- Magnesium oxide
- Organic grains: used to buff and polish; made from trees, plants, agricultural crops, straw, reeds, maize, sunflower or cane sugar.
- Sodium bicarbonate and sodium chloride crystals.
