= Oral myology =

Study of oral muscles

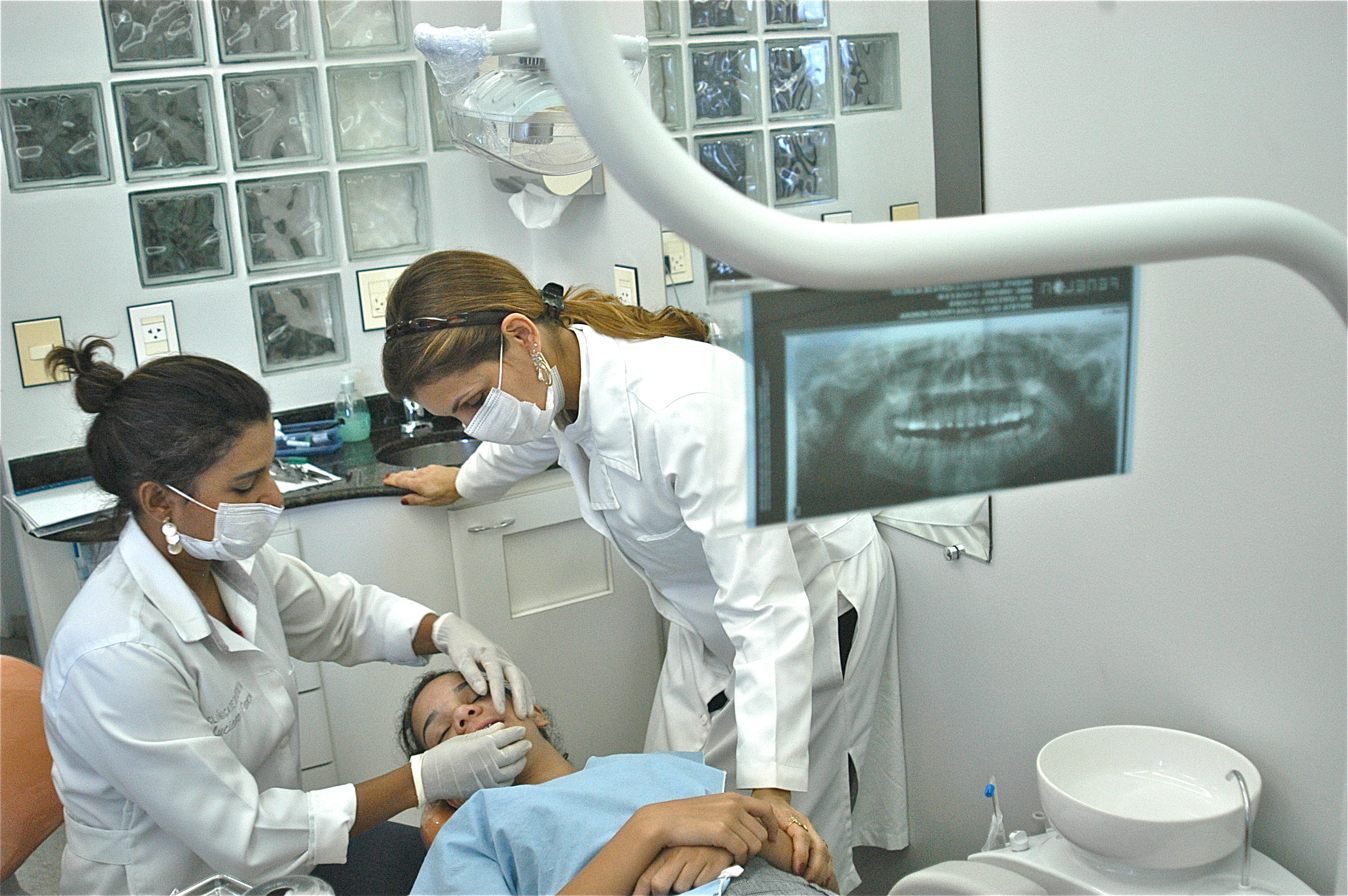
Orthodontics specialist adjusts orthodontic braces.

Oral myology (also known as "orofacial myology") is the field of study that involves the evaluation and treatment (known as "orofacial myofunctional therapy") of the oral and facial musculature, including the muscles of the tongue, lips, cheeks, and jaw.

== Use ==
Orofacial myofunctional therapy treatment is most commonly used to retrain oral rest posture, swallowing patterns in the oral phase, and speech.

=== Tongue thrust and thumb sucking ===
A major focus of the field of oral myology and treatment of orofacial myofunctional disorders includes tongue posture and establishing equilibrium between the tongue, lips and the cheek muscles. Tongue exercise proved to be successful in treating tongue thrust. Tongue exercise alone was reported to be successful in cessation of thumb sucking and treatment of anterior open bite malocclusion. When the tongue rests against the palate it begins to expand the maxilla by applying a slow and consistent force to the lingual (tongue side) surfaces of the teeth. This may aid in the treatment of crooked teeth and under-developed face.

=== Sleep apnea and snoring ===
Oral myology plays also an important role in the management of patients with sleep breathing disorders and snoring where oropharyngeal exercises were found to reduce the severity and primary symptoms of obstructive sleep apnea. Poor positioning of the tongue affects breathing and allows a series of events to occur that can affect the orofacial complex. Patients with sleep apnea and other breathing difficulties usually have decreased tone and mobility in the cheek, tongue, lip, and soft palate, and sensory alterations due to a tendency to engage in mouth breathing rather than nasal breathing. In treatment of sleep apnea, oral myology therapy involves a series of exercises designed to improve tongue position and tongue function for a better control of the extrinsic tongue muscles and place the tongue in a ‘‘proper posture during function and at rest.’’

=== Dysphagia ===
Disruption of normal swallowing, referred to as dysphagia, has a variety of reasons, among which is tongue muscles weakness and fatigue. The tongue is a critical organ in swallowing, providing the driving forces that transport food and liquid through the mouth and pharynx. Fatigue in the tongue muscles may contribute to incomplete food clearance (residue), prolonged time to complete a meal and reduced intake. Tongue exercise to increase the muscle tone is therefore an important part of the oral myology therapy of dysphagia.

=== Speech disorders ===
Dentofacial and functional malocclusions can also affect normal speech. Non-physiologic function of the tongue has been considered an important aetiological factor of malocclusions. The tongue is an important organ contributing to deglutition, speech, growth and development of the jaws, and alignment of the teeth in occlusion. The effect of the tongue on growth of the jaws and development of the occlusion is a result of its pressure on the teeth and other areas during rest and function. The number of tongue movements and the contact point of the tongue with the palate are different in the pronunciation of consonants and words. These can be affected by tongue malfunction such as tongue thrust. Accordingly, treatment of tongue thrust is essential for treatment of speech disorders, and oral myology therapy aiming at tongue muscles training is an important part of speech therapy.

== Intra-oral adhesive pads in oral myology ==
The use of intra-oral adhesive pads as part of oral myology therapy is a new technique to induce and assist in tongue exercise. One study suggests the use of adhesive pads was efficient in treatment of anterior open bite malocclusion and thumb sucking in children.

== See also ==
- Facial toning
