= Plasma needling =

Aesthetic medical procedure

Plasma needling is a minimally invasive aesthetic medical procedure purported to rejuvenate skin, minimize the appearance of hypertrophic and hypotrophic scars and stretchmarks, and reduce pattern hair loss through multimodal physical and biochemical cellular stimulation. It is a combination of classical medical micro-needling by Dermaroller or DermaPen. Both are used in Collagen induction therapy and PRP (platelet-rich plasma). The latter is used in Prolotherapy as well as in the Vampire facelift. The effects on fibroblasts, cells, and micro-needling stem cells are published in scientific publications regarding micro-needling, and the injection of PRP, has also been tested as a combined treatment.
