= Orthobiologics =

Field of medicine involving orthopedic tissue regeneration

Orthobiologics, also known as regenerative orthopedics, is a branch of regenerative medicine that utilizes products derived from biological sources, such as blood, fat, or bone marrow, naturally found in the human body to help injuries heal more quickly and efficiently. Ongoing clinical trials are investigating the applications of biologics in orthopedics.

Orthobiologics may be used in the treatment of musculoskeletal conditions, such as certain forms of arthritis, as well as injuries to tendons, ligaments, bones, muscles, spinal discs, meniscus of the knee, cartilage, or other musculoskeletal tissues. Biologics used in orthopedics can be derived from a patient's own body (autologous) or from a donor (allograft). Autologous cells are favored in Orthobiologics procedures due to their superior compatibility with the patient's body. Genetically identical cells significantly reduce the risk of immune rejection.

== History ==
Orthopedic surgeons first documented the use of bone marrow aspirate to improve bone chips implants into nonunion fractures. The term Orthobiologics was first cited in the 1990s, combining "ortho" (referring to orthopedics) and "biologics" (which refers to treatments derived from biological sources). The field of orthobiologics developed as interest grew in using biologically derived substances. Biologic products gained traction as regenerative medicine and biotechnology advanced, allowing for new applications in orthopedics. By the early 2000s, the term was well-established within the orthopedic and sports medicine community, focusing on minimally invasive treatments that use natural healing agents.

In 2013, researchers at Hospital for Special Surgery published the study "Clinical and MRI outcomes after platelet-rich plasma treatment for knee osteoarthritis" (2013)." The study presented early evidence that the therapy improved function and reduced pain and inflammation.

Advancements in orthobiologics include using platelets, progenitor cells, or mesenchymal stromal cells (MSC), for musculoskeletal conditions affecting cartilage, muscle, tendons, ligaments, spinal disc, and bone. Some commonly used orthobiologics include platelet-rich plasma (PRP), concentrated bone marrow aspirate (cBMA), or adipose-derived therapies such as microfragmented fat tissue (MFAT). Innovations in cartilage regeneration also include techniques such as matrix-induced autologous chondrocyte implantation (MACI) and biomimetic scaffolds. Additionally, growth factors like bone morphogenetic proteins (BMP) are used to enhance bone regeneration. While all the above are approved or cleared for clinical use, other orthobiologics, not yet cleared for use in the clinic but being currently investigated include the use of so-called birth tissues such as umbilical cord cells or amniotic-derived products, as well as other biological products like exosomes. Researchers are also evaluating other approaches such as 3D printing and gene therapy that can offer new treatments for orthopedic injuries and degenerative conditions.

In 2022, researchers from multiple institutions conducted an 11-year review of 474 research articles on orthobiologics. The literature included 132 clinical, 271 nonclinical, and 71 peer-reviewed articles consisting of 244 platelet-rich plasma articles, 146 bone marrow aspirate articles, 72 adipose-derived cells articles, and 12 amniotic cells articles. The review concluded that advancements in the field of orthobiologics requires the establishment of minimum reporting standards and higher-quality studies on the topic.

In 2024, researchers conducted a cohort study of 253 patients with knee osteoarthritis to test the effectiveness of platelet-rich plasma (PRP) injections with varying platelet concentrations. Patients were assigned to receive PRP with either high, medium, or low platelet concentration levels, and their outcomes were measured over time. Results showed a clear link between platelet concentration and treatment success: the low-platelet group had a 15% failure rate, while both medium- and high-platelet groups had only a 3.3% failure rate. All groups, however, experienced clinical improvement during the study period.

== Tissue sources ==
Common tissues and types of cells extracted for orthopedic biologic therapies include:

- Adipose (fat) tissue: adipose-derived stem cells (ADSCs), adipose-derived stromal cells (ASCs), mesenchymal stromal cells (MSCs)
- Bone marrow: bone marrow aspirate concentrate (BMAC), mesenchymal stem cells (MSCs), hematopoietic stem cells
- Blood: platelet-rich plasma (PRP), platelet-poor plasma (PPP), autologous conditioned serum, autologous conditioned plasma
- Peri-natal tissues: Umbilical cord bloods, amniotic membrane, placenta

== Medical uses ==
Orthobiologics are employed in the treatment of acute musculoskeletal injuries and chronic degenerative conditions, including tendonitis and tendinosis, degenerative disc disease, delayed-healing bone fractures, plantar fasciitis, hip labral tears, cartilage injuries, muscle strains, meniscus tears, ligament sprains and tears, and osteoarthritis.

Their therapeutic role is based on the ability to stimulate healing in musculoskeletal tissues. Most act by releasing anti-inflammatory and immune-modulating factors that enhance the local tissue environment and promote repair.

Orthobiologics may be administered as stand-alone treatments or as adjuncts to surgical procedures.

=== Injectable ===
==== Platelet-rich plasma ====
Platelet-rich plasma (PRP) therapy concentrates platelets and growth factors, and they are used to decrease healing time in injured tissues. The therapy is a treatment modality for symptoms of osteoarthritis, tendon and ligament injuries, cartilage repair, and post-surgical recovery.

The therapy is used to decrease healing time for ligament sprains and tears alongside traditional treatments. Clinicians currently use PRP therapy to augment surgical repair of tendons, including rotator cuff tendon, Achilles tendon, and hip gluteal tendon. PRP is also used to treat chronic conditions such as tennis elbow and rotator cuff tendonitis.

Studies show PRP therapy can aid in managing symptoms in knee osteoarthritis patients by regulating inflammatory pathways.

PRP therapy is used together with surgical interventions to further improve post-surgical recovery and tissue healing after orthopedic surgical procedures. It has been shown to reduce inflammation, lead to faster recoveries, and improve post-surgery healing.

==== Bone marrow aspirate ====
Concentrated bone marrow aspirate (cBMA) injection is an autologous biologic treatment. Bone marrow contains a population of connective tissue progenitor cells. The patient's bone marrow is extracted, then the cells and growth factors are concentrated in a centrifuge. The concentrate is injected into a damaged area for tissue regeneration.

==== Adipose tissue ====
Micro fragmented adipose tissue (MFAT) is an autologous biologic technique that uses fat cells to promote healing for joint injuries and certain conditions like osteoarthritis.

=== Surgical ===
Orthobiologics are used to improve surgical outcomes by using biologics to stimulate healing in musculoskeletal tissues. They are used to stimulate healing during or after surgical procedures for soft tissue reconstruction, tendon and ligament repair, and bone grafts.

==== Cartilage repair ====
Autologous chondrocyte implantation (ACI) is a surgical procedure used for cartilage repair in the knee joint. Healthy cartilage cells are harvested from the patient, cultured in a laboratory, then implanted into the damaged joint. Similar to ACI, matrix-associated autologous chondrocyte implantation (MACI) iterates on the technique.

MACI combines cultured cells and biomimetic scaffolds to improve integration of the newly-formed cartilage tissue. Clinicians use natural scaffold materials such as collagen, hyaluronic acid, chitosan, and alginate, as well as synthetic scaffold materials such as polylactic acid, polyglycolic acid, and polycaprolactone. Often, natural and synthetic materials are combined in hybrid scaffolds.

==== Bone repair ====
The use of orthobiologics in in-bone healing involves synthetic bone grafts and bone morphogenetic proteins (BMPs). BMPs are a group of growth factors known as cytokines. BMPs are often used with synthetic bone grafts. The synthetic bone grafts can be made from calcium phosphate, hydroxyapatite, and bioactive glass to imitate the natural bone matrix. These materials mimic the natural bone matrix and support bone cell proliferation.

== Regulation ==
In the United States, the Food and Drug Administration (FDA) regulates the use of orthobiologics. In addition, the Federal Trade Commission regulates all marketing and advertising claims about orthobiologics.

In the European Union, the use of orthobiologics is regulated by the European Medicines Agency (EMA) and by the National Competent Authorities of the individual EU member states.

Elsewhere, regulations vary by individual country.

== Challenges ==
Orthobiologics faces challenges including regulatory hurdles, clinical evidence to support efficacy, industry standardization and detailed classification, and high costs. Since orthobiologics is a developing area of medicine, many insurance providers consider it to be experimental and will not cover them, requiring patients to pay out of pocket.

== See also ==
Regenerative medicine
