= Autologous blood therapy =

Therapy using a patient's own blood

Autologous blood therapy, also known as autologous blood injection or autohemotherapy, comprises certain types of hemotherapy using a person's own blood (auto- + hemo- + therapy). There are several kinds, belonging to traditional medicine, alternative medicine, and some newer kind of medicine under investigation. The original, unscientific form is "the immediate intramuscular or subcutaneous reinjection of freshly drawn autologous blood". It was used in the early 20th century, when some physicians believed that it had efficacy and a logical mechanism of action; it was abandoned as advancing science made clear that it lacked those.

The other forms involve some change to the blood before it is reinjected, typically oxygenation, ozonation (ozonated autohemotherapy), ultraviolet light exposure, or centrifugation. Forms include platelet-rich plasma (PRP), and autologous conditioned serum (ACS).

It is possible that ozonated or UV autohemotherapy may have real efficacy and effectiveness in autoimmune diseases, if they are immunomodulatory in some way (such as by interfering with the deranged autoantibodies), but this mechanism of action, if it exists, is not yet well understood; it is also logical that whatever molecular changes the ozone and UV bring about are unlikely to act specifically on just the desired target molecules, meaning that risks are involved.

Although autologous blood donation and plasmapheresis are conceptually analogous, they are differentiated from autologous blood therapy in the autohemotherapy sense of that term, having thoroughly scientific bases.

== History ==
Autohemotherapy use in dermatology was popular in the early 1900s but was abandoned by conventional dermatologists due to a lack of supporting evidence of efficacy. A resurgence of interest in the 2000s has led to several investigations evaluating the use of autohemotherapy as a treatment for specific dermatological conditions such as hives (urticaria) and eczema. A review of these studies concludes that, though safe, autohemotherapy is only somewhat more effective than injection of saline solution.

== Scientific research ==
In 2022, autohemotherapy was studied for its effect on ME/CFS, in which 220 patients were treated with oxygen-ozone autohemotherapy for X weeks, at least two 30min long sessions per week. Significant improvements in ME/CFS were noted at statistically significant p-value < 0.0001. When treated with O2-O3-AHT fatigue symptoms within the first one-two weeks ameliorated from a score value of 7 (meaning the worst) to 1 (meaning the best, i.e., completely absent symptoms) in almost half of the oxygen-ozone treated patients (43.5%). However, researchers did not determine the mechanism of action resulting in patient improvement. The study did not include a control group, making it impossible to know if the treatment had any effect greater than a placebo. No randomized control trial, considered the standard for medical research, has shown ozone autohemotherapy to be effective.

== "Vampire facials" ==
One fringe dermatologic application of autohemotherapy, colloquially called a "vampire facial", came to public attention in 2013 when an Instagram posting by celebrity Kim Kardashian West portrayed her "blood-soaked face" during the administration of the procedure. Kardashian West later stated that she regretted undergoing the painful procedure. A vampire facial procedure involves a combination of microneedling followed by topical application of platelet-rich plasma derived from the centrifugation of the subject's own blood into various autologous blood products. Proponents claim that autologous platelet-rich plasma delivered subcutaneously to the skin of the face can improve its health by stimulating skin cell growth and collagen though the treatment is considered to lie outside of mainstream medicine because claimed benefits are unsupported by scientific evidence from clinical studies. Side effects of the treatment may include redness, swelling, bruising, tenderness, tingling, numbness, lumpiness, and/or a feeling of pressure or fullness at the injection sites which, providers claim, people recover from within two days with outlying reports from patients whose recovery took a week or more with scabbing and other problems.

More serious safety concerns have been cited for these treatments when performed in non-medical settings by people untrained in infection control. The New Mexico Department of Health issued a statement that at least one such business offering vampire facials "could potentially spread blood-borne infections such as HIV, hepatitis B and hepatitis C to clients.” This was subsequently confirmed by the CDC following a number of HIV infections first reported in 2024.

In contrast, so-called "vampire filler" is autologous platelets used as dermal filler in the platelet-rich fibrin matrix method of cosmetic surgery; it is generally not described as autohemotherapy and the FDA-approved machines for it are approved for use by only licensed surgeons.

== See also ==
- Ozone therapy
- Discolysis
- Collagen induction therapy
