= Tatiana Sampaio =

Brazilian biologist

Tatiana Coelho de Sampaio
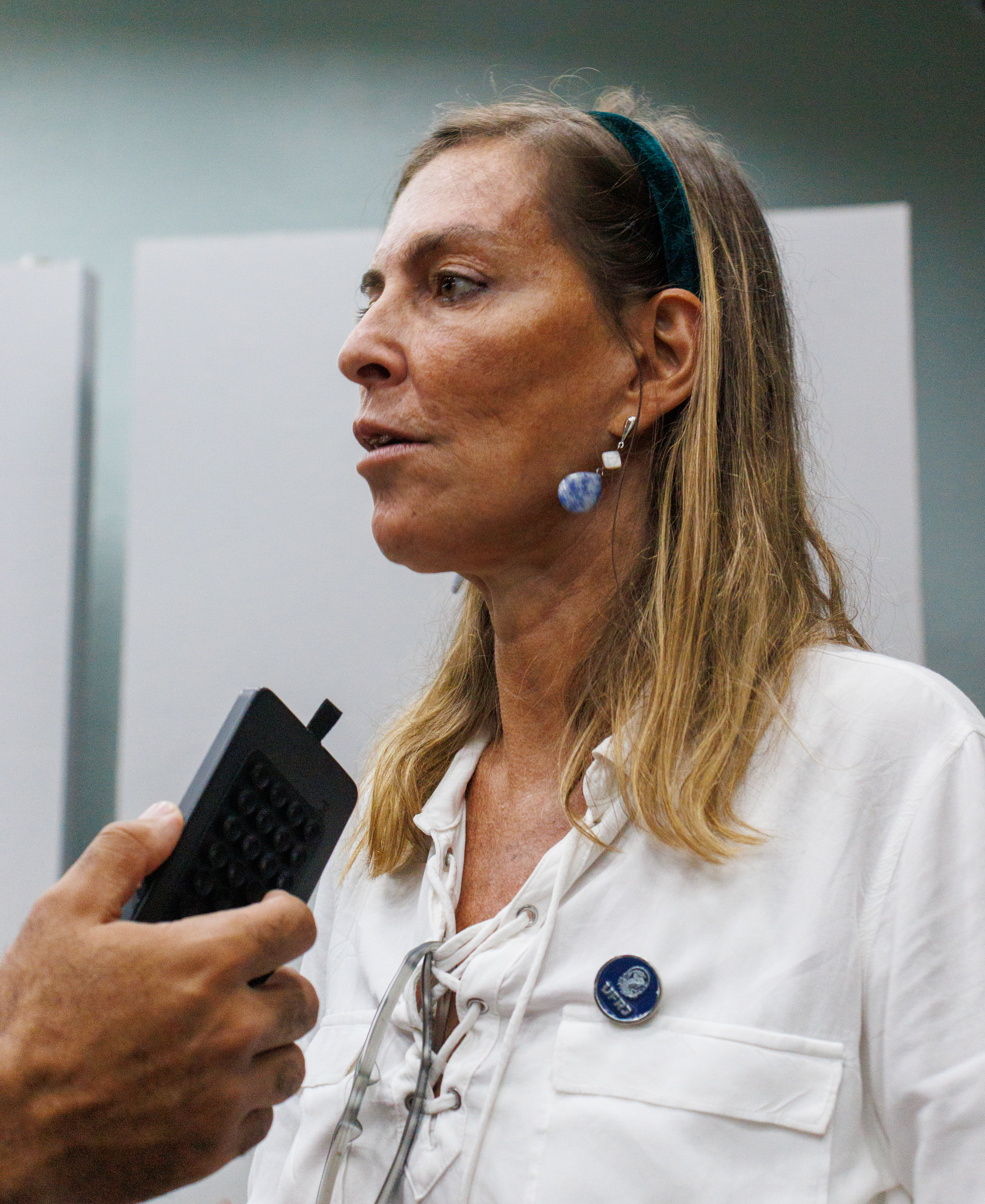
- Education: Federal University of Rio de Janeiro
- Occupation: Biologist
- Known for: Development of polylaminin
- Scientific career
- Fields: Biology; Regenerative biology; Cell biology
- Workplaces: Federal University of Rio de Janeiro

Tatiana Lobo Coelho de Sampaio is a Brazilian biologist and professor at the Federal University of Rio de Janeiro (UFRJ) who developed an innovative therapeutic approach potentially capable of reversing spinal cord injury. A researcher recognized in the fields of regenerative biology and cell biology, she is responsible for the development of polylaminin, a polymerized form of the extracellular matrix protein laminin that is being investigated as a therapeutic agent for neural regeneration. Coelho de Sampaio serves as a university professor and head of laboratory at UFRJ, where she coordinates research focused on the recovery of nervous system tissues.

== Education ==
Coelho de Sampaio holds a degree in Biology, with academic training focused on cell biology and the molecular biology of the extracellular matrix. She completed graduate studies, including a master's degree and a doctorate, conducting research centered on the role of extracellular matrix proteins in development, tissue organization, and regenerative processes.

Her scientific training laid the foundation for a research line dedicated to laminins, glycoproteins of the extracellular matrix that are crucial for cell adhesion, migration, differentiation, and survival, especially in the central nervous system.

== Academic career ==
Since the 2000s, Coelho de Sampaio has worked as a lecturer and researcher at the Federal University of Rio de Janeiro (UFRJ), where she leads the Laboratory of Extracellular Matrix Biology. In this capacity, she supervises undergraduate research students, master's and doctoral candidates, and postdoctoral researchers, while collaborating with national and international research groups.

Her academic activity includes publishing peer-reviewed scientific articles, presenting at scientific conferences, serving on examination committees, and securing research funding from public agencies and foundations.

== Research ==
Her main research line focuses on the extracellular matrix and, in particular, on laminins, structural proteins that organize tissues and mediate communication between cells and their microenvironment.

Her studies indicate that certain organizational forms of laminin possess biological properties distinct from traditionally studied forms, especially regarding the induction of axonal growth and modulation of the inflammatory environment after central nervous system injury.

=== Discovery of polylaminin ===
From these investigations, the group led by Coelho de Sampaio described the formation of a polymerized laminin structure, named polylaminin. This structure shows biomimetic features similar to those present during embryonic development, a period characterized by greater regenerative capacity in the nervous system.

Preclinical studies in animal models indicated that the application of polylaminin to injured areas of the spinal cord can:

- promote axonal regeneration;
- reduce local inflammatory processes;
- stimulate reorganization of the extracellular microenvironment;
- contribute to the partial recovery of motor functions in experimental models.

These results led to intellectual property protection for the technology and initiated technology transfer processes aimed at future clinical application.

== Clinical trials and translational efforts ==
Polylaminin research advanced to regulatory stages and was registered in the Brazilian Clinical Trials Registry (ReBEC) for initial human studies, intended to evaluate safety, feasibility, and preliminary signs of efficacy in patients with acute spinal cord injury.

The progress of this research has attracted media attention, scientific institutions, and public agencies, and it has been cited among the most promising Brazilian studies in neural regeneration and health-related biology.

== See also ==
- Regenerative biology
- Neural regeneration
- Spinal cord injury
- Extracellular matrix
