= Prolotherapy =

Experimental back pain therapy

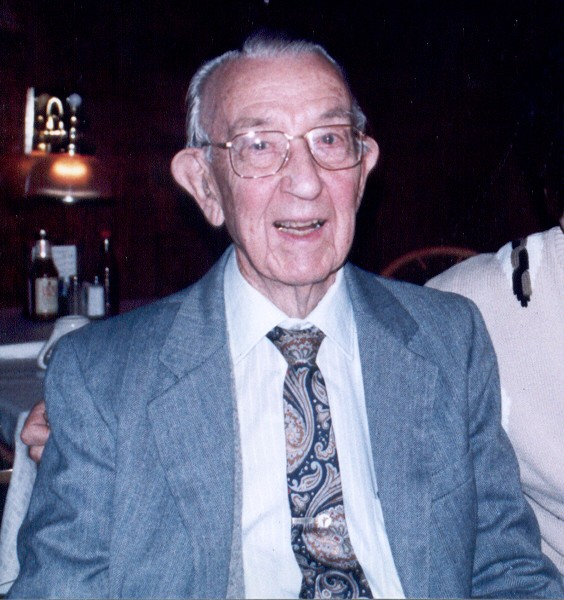
Gustav Hemwall (1908-1998) circa 1990-1995

Prolotherapy, also called proliferation therapy, is an injection-based unproven treatment used in chronic musculoskeletal conditions.

== Medical uses ==
A 2015 review found no evidence that prolotherapy is safe or effective for Achilles tendinopathy, plantar fasciosis, and Osgood–Schlatter disease. The quality of the studies was also poor. Another 2015 review assigned a strength of recommendation level A for Achilles tendinopathy and knee osteoarthritis and level B for lateral epicondylosis, Osgood–Schlatter disease, and plantar fasciosis. Level A recommendations are based on consistent and good-quality patient-oriented evidence while level B are based on inconsistent or limited-quality patient-oriented evidence.

=== Low back pain ===
A 2007 Cochrane review of prolotherapy in adults with chronic low-back pain found unclear evidence of effect. A 2009 review concluded the same for subacute low back pain. A 2015 review found consistent evidence that it does not help in low back pain. There was tentative evidence of benefit when used with other low back pain treatments. Evidence of benefit remains tentative (level B) for dextrose prolotherapy in low back or sacroiliac pain.

=== Tendinitis ===
A 2009 systematic review of the efficacy in the treatment of lateral epicondylitis concluded that these therapies may benefit people with lateral epicondylitis, but the evidence was limited. A 2010 review concluded moderate evidence exists to support the use of prolotherapy injections in the management of pain in lateral epicondylitis, and that prolotherapy was no more effective than eccentric exercise in the treatment of Achilles tendinopathy. A 2016 review found a trend towards benefit in 2016 for lateral epicondylitis. A 2017 review found tentative evidence in Achilles tendinopathy.

In 2012, a systematic review studying various injection therapies found that prolotherapy and hyaluronic acid injection therapies were more effective than placebo when treating lateral epicondylitis. Of the studies evaluated, one of ten glucocorticoid trials, one of five trials for autologous blood injection or platelet-rich plasma, one trial of polidocanol, and one trial of prolotherapy met the criteria for low risk of bias. The authors noted that few of the reviewed trials met the criteria for low risk of bias.

=== Knee osteoarthritis ===
Tentative evidence of prolotherapy benefit was reported in a 2011 review. One 2017 review found evidence of benefit from low-quality studies. A 2017 review described the evidence as moderate for knee osteoarthritis. A 2016 review found benefit but there was a moderate degree of variability between trials and risk of bias. In 2019, the American College of Rheumatology recommended against prolotherapy for knee osteoarthritis.

== Contraindications ==
Contraindications for patients to receive prolotherapy injections may include:

- Local abscess
- Bleeding disorders
- Patient on anticoagulant medication
- Known allergy to prolotherapy agent
- Acute infections such as cellulitis
- Septic arthritis

Relative contraindications include:

- Acute gouty arthritis
- Acute fracture

== Side effects ==
Patients receiving prolotherapy injections have reported generally mild side effects, including mild pain and irritation at the injection site (often within 72 hours of the injection), numbness at the injection site, or mild bleeding. Pain from prolotherapy injections is temporary and is often treated with acetaminophen or, in rare cases, opioid medications. NSAIDs are not usually recommended due to their counter action to prolotherapy-induced inflammation, but are occasionally used in patients with pain refractory to other methods of pain control. Theoretical adverse events of prolotherapy injection include lightheadedness, allergic reactions to the agent used, bruising, infection, or nerve damage. Allergic reactions to sodium morrhuate are rare. Rare cases of back pain, neck pain, spinal cord irritation, pneumothorax, and disc injury have been reported at a rate comparable to that of other spinal injection procedures.

== Technique ==
Prolotherapy involves the injection of an irritant solution into a joint space, weakened ligament, or tendon insertion to relieve pain. Most commonly, hyperosmolar dextrose (a sugar) is the solution used; glycerine, lidocaine (a commonly used local anesthetic), phenol, and sodium morrhuate (a derivative of cod liver oil extract) are other commonly used agents. The injection is administered at joints, ligaments, or tendons where they connect to bone.

Prolotherapy treatment sessions are generally given every two to six weeks for several months in a series ranging from three to six or more treatments. Many patients receive treatment at less frequent intervals until treatments are rarely required, if at all.

== Terminology and mechanism ==
The term originated with George S. Hackett, MD, in 1956 in a publication titled "The rehabilitation of an incompetent structure by the generation of new cellular tissue". He applied the term prolotherapy from the words "proli'" (Latin), meaning offspring, and "proliferate", meaning to produce new cells in rapid succession. Although the erroneous term "sclerotherapy" was utilized by some in the past to describe this treatment, it is now clear that prolotherapy does not cause scarring. The mechanism of prolotherapy requires further clarification. It is expected to involve a number of mechanisms.

== Criticism ==
Some major medical insurance policies view prolotherapy as an investigational or experimental therapy with an inconclusive evidence base. Consequently, they currently do not provide coverage for prolotherapy procedures. Medicare reviewers in 1999 determined at that time that practitioners had not provided "any scientific evidence on which to base a [different] coverage decision," and so retained Medicare's current coverage policy to not cover prolotherapy injections for chronic low back pain, but expressed willingness to reconsider if presented with results of "further studies on the benefits of prolotherapy."

== History ==
The concept of creating irritation or injury to stimulate healing has been recorded as early as Roman times when hot needles were poked into the shoulders of injured gladiators.

In 1840, French surgeon Alfred-Armand-Louis-Marie Velpeau published a paper detailing how he had injected an iodine solution into a hernia in order to create beneficial inflammation. American surgeon Joseph Pancoast later wrote that he had been performing this procedure (using either iodine or cantharides) since 1836. Another early American practitioner of this method was George Heaton.

After World War 1, sclerotherapy came to be a common treatment for malformations of blood vessels and the lymphatic system. This involved injecting a therapeutic liquid to shrink them.

By the late 1920s, this method was used to treat hernias. By the late 1930s, it was also used to treat ligamentous laxity. In the 1950s, George S. Hackett, a general surgeon in the United States, began performing injections of irritant solutions in an effort to repair joints and hernias.

In 1955, Gustav Anders Hemwall became acquainted with George Hackett at an American Medical Association meeting and started practicing the technique.

Hackett coined the term "prolotherapy" for the practice, a very early appearance being in his 1956 book Ligament and Tendon Relaxation (Skeletal Disability) Treated by Prolotherapy (Fibro-Osseus Proliferation).
