= Regenerative medicine =

Medical field involved in regenerating tissues

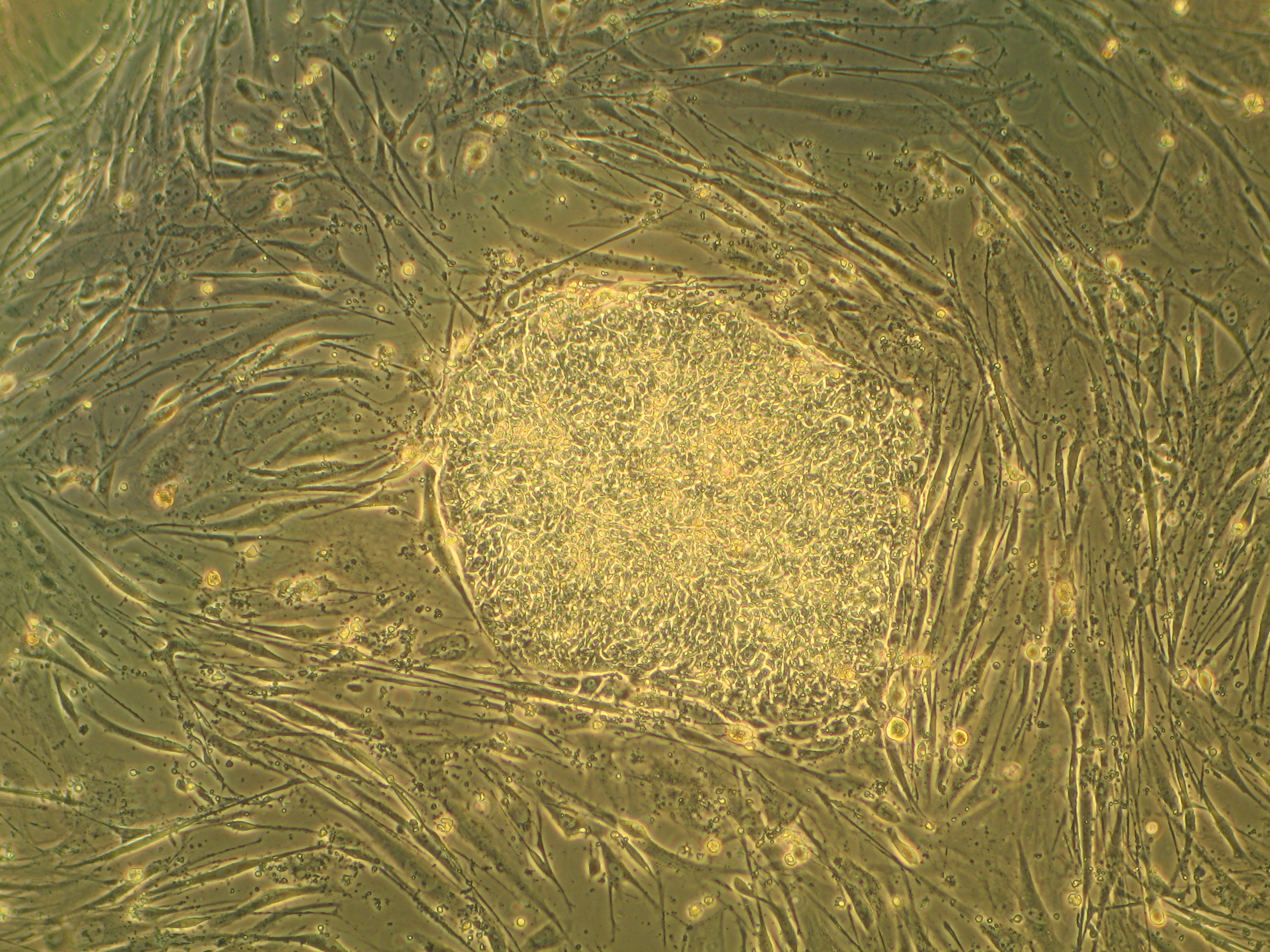
A colony of human embryonic stem cells

Regenerative medicine deals with the "process of replacing, engineering or regenerating human or animal cells, tissues or organs to restore or establish normal function". This field holds the promise of engineering damaged tissues and organs by stimulating the body's own repair mechanisms to functionally heal previously irreparable tissues or organs.

Regenerative medicine also includes the possibility of growing tissues and organs in the laboratory and implanting them when the body cannot heal itself. When the cell source for a regenerated organ is derived from the patient's own tissue or cells, the challenge of organ transplant rejection via immunological mismatch is circumvented. This approach could alleviate the problem of the shortage of organs available for donation.

Some of the biomedical approaches within the field of regenerative medicine may involve the use of stem cells. Examples include the injection of stem cells or progenitor cells obtained through directed differentiation (cell therapies); the induction of regeneration by biologically active molecules administered alone or as a secretion by infused cells (immunomodulation therapy); and transplantation of in vitro grown organs and tissues (tissue engineering).

== History ==
The ancient Greeks postulated whether parts of the body could be regenerated in the 700s BC. Skin grafting, invented in the late 19th century, can be thought of as the earliest major attempt to recreate bodily tissue to restore structure and function. Advances in transplanting body parts in the 20th century further pushed the theory that body parts could regenerate and grow new cells. These advances led to tissue engineering, and from this field, the study of regenerative medicine expanded and began to take hold. This began with cellular therapy, which led to the stem cell research that is widely being conducted today.

The first cell therapies were intended to slow the aging process. This began in the 1930s with Paul Niehans, a Swiss doctor who was known to have treated famous historical figures such as Pope Pius XII, Charlie Chaplin, and king Ibn Saud of Saudi Arabia. Niehans would inject cells of young animals (usually lambs or calves) into his patients in an attempt to rejuvenate them. In 1956, a more sophisticated process was created to treat leukemia by inserting bone marrow from a healthy person into a patient with leukemia. This process worked mostly due to both the donor and receiver in this case being identical twins. Nowadays, bone marrow can be taken from people who are similar enough to the patient who needs the cells to prevent rejection.

The term "regenerative medicine" was first used in a 1992 article on hospital administration by Leland Kaiser. Kaiser's paper closes with a series of short paragraphs on future technologies that will impact hospitals. One paragraph had "Regenerative Medicine" as a bold print title and stated, "A new branch of medicine will develop that attempts to change the course of chronic disease and in many instances will regenerate tired and failing organ systems."

The term was brought into the popular culture in 1999 by William A. Haseltine when he coined the term during a conference on Lake Como, to describe interventions that restore to normal function that which is damaged by disease, injured by trauma, or worn by time. Haseltine was briefed on the project to isolate human embryonic stem cells and embryonic germ cells at Geron Corporation in collaboration with researchers at the University of Wisconsin–Madison and Johns Hopkins School of Medicine. He recognized that these cells' unique ability to differentiate into all the cell types of the human body (pluripotency) had the potential to develop into a new kind of regenerative therapy. Explaining the new class of therapies that such cells could enable, he used the term "regenerative medicine" in the way that it is used today: "an approach to therapy that ... employs human genes, proteins and cells to re-grow, restore or provide mechanical replacements for tissues that have been injured by trauma, damaged by disease or worn by time" and "offers the prospect of curing diseases that cannot be treated effectively today, including those related to aging".

Later, Haseltine would go on to explain that regenerative medicine acknowledges the reality that most people, regardless of which illness they have or which treatment they require, simply want to be restored to normal health. Designed to be applied broadly, the original definition includes cell and stem cell therapies, gene therapy, tissue engineering, genomic medicine, personalized medicine, biomechanical prosthetics, recombinant proteins, and antibody treatments. It also includes more familiar chemical pharmacopeia—in short, any intervention that restores a person to normal health. In addition to functioning as shorthand for a wide range of technologies and treatments, the term "regenerative medicine" is also patient friendly. It solves the problem that confusing or intimidating language discourages patients.

The term regenerative medicine is increasingly conflated with research on stem cell therapies. Some academic programs and departments retain the original broader definition while others use it to describe work on stem cell research.

From 1995 to 1998 Michael D. West, PhD, organized and managed the research between Geron Corporation and its academic collaborators James Thomson at the University of Wisconsin–Madison and John Gearhart of Johns Hopkins University that led to the first isolation of human embryonic stem and human embryonic germ cells, respectively.

In March 2000, Haseltine, Antony Atala, M.D., Michael D. West, Ph.D., and other leading researchers founded E-Biomed: The Journal of Regenerative Medicine. The peer-reviewed journal facilitated discourse around regenerative medicine by publishing innovative research on stem cell therapies, gene therapies, tissue engineering, and biomechanical prosthetics. The Society for Regenerative Medicine, later renamed the Regenerative Medicine and Stem Cell Biology Society, served a similar purpose, creating a community of like-minded experts from around the world.

In June 2008, at the Hospital Clínic de Barcelona, Professor Paolo Macchiarini and his team, of the University of Barcelona, performed the first tissue engineered trachea (wind pipe) transplantation. Adult stem cells were extracted from the patient's bone marrow, grown into a large population, and matured into cartilage cells, or chondrocytes, using an adaptive method originally devised for treating osteoarthritis. The team then seeded the newly grown chondrocytes, as well as epithelial cells, into a decellularised (free of donor cells) tracheal segment that was donated from a 51-year-old transplant donor who had died of cerebral hemorrhage. After four days of seeding, the graft was used to replace the patient's left main bronchus. After one month, a biopsy elicited local bleeding, indicating that the blood vessels had already grown back successfully.

In 2009, the SENS Foundation was launched, with its stated aim as "the application of regenerative medicine – defined to include the repair of living cells and extracellular material in situ – to the diseases and disabilities of ageing". In 2012, Professor Paolo Macchiarini and his team improved upon the 2008 implant by transplanting a laboratory-made trachea seeded with the patient's own cells.

On September 12, 2014, surgeons at the Institute of Biomedical Research and Innovation Hospital in Kobe, Japan, transplanted a 1.3 by 3.0 millimeter sheet of retinal pigment epithelium cells, which were differentiated from iPS cells through directed differentiation, into an eye of an elderly woman, who suffers from age-related macular degeneration.

In 2016, Paolo Macchiarini was fired from Karolinska University in Sweden due to falsified test results and lies. The TV-show Experimenten aired on Swedish Television and detailed all the lies and falsified results.

== Global Research Infrastructure ==
Widespread interest and funding for research on regenerative medicine has prompted institutions in the United States and around the world to establish departments and research institutes that specialize in regenerative medicine including: The Department of Rehabilitation and Regenerative Medicine at Columbia University, the Institute for Stem Cell Biology and Regenerative Medicine at Stanford University, the Center for Regenerative and Nanomedicine at Northwestern University, the Wake Forest Institute for Regenerative Medicine, and the British Heart Foundation Centers of Regenerative Medicine at the University of Oxford. In China, institutes dedicated to regenerative medicine are run by the Chinese Academy of Sciences, Tsinghua University, and the Chinese University of Hong Kong, among others.

== Research ==
Current research in regenerative medicine spans a continuous spectrum from fundamental cell biology to clinical translational engineering, focusing on deciphering and manipulating the signaling pathways that govern tissue morphogenesis, cellular differentiation, and scarless wound healing. Rather than merely managing chronic symptoms, active laboratory investigations aim to understand why adult mammalian tissues lose the regenerative capacities inherent in lower vertebrates and human embryonic states. Research strategies are broadly categorized into three interdependent vectors: cell-based therapies, which isolate and direct stem cell fates; biomaterial design, which engineers bioactive scaffolds to mimic the native extracellular matrix; and the delivery of localized biochemical cues, such as growth factors and gene-editing complexes, to orchestrate endogenous tissue repair. A major bottleneck in ongoing research is solving the scalability of functional vascularization, as complex engineered tissues cannot survive past the limits of oxygen diffusion without an integrated capillary network.

=== Organoids and regenerative medicine ===
Organoids are three-dimensional cellular structures derived from adult stem cells or pluripotent stem cells. Cultured in vitro under appropriate conditions, these cells can self-organize and reproduce certain structural and functional characteristics of a tissue or an organ. However, organoids are not complete organs: they are simplified models that allow researchers to study certain aspects of the organization and functioning of human tissues.

In regenerative medicine, organoids are being studied as a complementary approach to tissue engineering. They can be used to analyze the mechanisms of tissue development, model certain diseases, and test drugs on human cells. Organoids have been developed for the intestine, liver, kidney, retina, brain, and lung. When derived from a patient's cells, they can also be used in personalized medicine approaches, for example to compare responses to different treatments.

One of the applications being investigated is the use of organoids or organoid-derived cells to promote the repair of damaged tissues. Preclinical studies are exploring, for example, the transplantation of intestinal, hepatic, renal, or retinal organoids. The objective is for the transplanted cells to survive, integrate into the recipient tissue, and contribute to restoring certain functions. However, this strategy remains largely at the preclinical research stage and should not be confused with organ transplantation already established in clinical practice.

Several technical limitations still hinder the therapeutic use of organoids. Their size and maturation may be limited by the absence of a functional network of blood vessels capable of providing a sufficient supply of oxygen and nutrients. Vascularization is therefore an important challenge in obtaining larger tissues that more closely resemble human organs. Batch-to-batch variability, cellular heterogeneity, protocol reproducibility, long-term stability, and the standardization of culture methods also represent difficulties for their clinical use.

Current research therefore combines organoid culture with various bioengineering approaches, such as biomaterials, microfluidic systems, and methods that promote vascularization and tissue maturation. These developments aim to improve the reproducibility and physiological relevance of the models, while assessing their safety before any potential therapeutic application.

=== Targeted Tissues and Organs ===
==== Cardiovascular tissues ====
Cardiovascular regenerative medicine focuses on repairing damaged myocardial tissue, heart valves, and peripheral blood vessels, primarily targeting ischemic heart disease and congenital heart defects. Because adult mammalian cardiomyocytes possess highly restricted proliferative capacity, therapeutic strategies utilize engineered cardiac patches, cell-seeded hydrogels, and decellularized extracellular matrix (ECM) components to stimulate localized myocardial repair after a myocardial infarction. Clinical and pre-clinical research focuses heavily on using induced pluripotent stem cell-derived cardiomyocytes (hiPSC-CMs) and vascular endothelial cells embedded within porous, biomimetic polymeric scaffolds to ensure functional electrical coupling and host tissue integration. Additionally, tissue-engineered vascular grafts (TEVGs) are investigated as synthetic or bio-resorbable alternatives for coronary artery bypass surgery, where scaffold porosity is precisely tuned to allow host cell infiltration, smooth muscle cell remodeling, and functional neovascularization without inducing thrombosis.

==== Pulmonary tissues ====
Lung tissue engineering focuses on developing functional respiratory structures to treat end-stage pulmonary diseases, such as chronic obstructive pulmonary disease (COPD), pulmonary fibrosis, and acute respiratory distress syndrome (ARDS). Due to the complex, highly vascularized three-dimensional architecture of the lung, which comprises over forty distinct cell types and a delicate alveolar-capillary basement membrane, whole-organ biofabrication typically relies on decellularized donor lung scaffolds. This process strips away immunogenic cellular material while preserving the native extracellular matrix geometry and mechanical compliance required for ventilation. Research strategies prioritize the multi-lineage recellularization of these scaffolds using patient-specific induced pluripotent stem cells (iPSCs) differentiated into alveolar epithelial cells (type I and II) and microvascular endothelial cells. Additionally, biomimetic microfluidic platforms, or "lung-on-a-chip" models, are utilized to study cellular shear stress and gas-exchange dynamics, serving as precursors to transplantable bioartificial lung devices.

==== Musculoskeletal and bone tissues ====
Musculoskeletal applications represent a commercially mature sector of tissue engineering, focusing on the repair of critical-sized bone defects, articular cartilage lesions, and volumetric muscle loss. For orthopedic bone regeneration, therapeutic approaches utilize osteoconductive and osteoinductive scaffolds composed of bioceramics (such as hydroxyapatite and beta-tricalcium phosphate), biodegradable polymers, or composite hydrogels. These matrices serve as physical frameworks that recruit endogenous mesenchymal stem cells (MSCs) and promote osteogenesis. A critical challenge in bone tissue engineering is achieving adequate neovascularization within the core of large scaffolds to prevent core necrosis before host capillary ingrowth occurs. Consequently, modern biomaterial designs often implement multi-scale porosity, integrating smaller voids for nutrient diffusion with macro-channels greater than 100 micrometers, to facilitate deep cellular infiltration, matrix mineralization, and functional host tissue integration.

==== Neuroregeneration ====
Regenerative strategies within the central nervous system (CNS) and peripheral nervous system (PNS) address severe impairments caused by spinal cord injuries, ischemic strokes, and neurodegenerative disorders such as Parkinson's disease. The therapeutic microenvironment of the adult brain and spinal cord is highly inhibitory to axon growth due to the formation of glial scars and chondroitin sulfate proteoglycans. Neuroregeneration research utilizes injectable hydrogels, shear-thinning biomaterials, and electrospun guidance conduits to physically bridge lesion cavities. These scaffolds are frequently loaded with neural stem cells (NSCs), neurotrophic growth factors, or enzyme-releasing agents to neutralize inhibitory molecular cues, support survival of transplanted dopaminergic or motor neurons, and provide a permissive physical framework for directed axonal elongation and synaptogenesis.

==== Skin and chronic wounds ====
Dermal regeneration involves the development of bioengineered skin substitutes and advanced wound dressings to treat deep third-degree burns, diabetic foot ulcers, and extensive chronic wounds. Unlike traditional occlusive dressings, regenerative skin scaffolds provide a temporary, porous extracellular matrix analog that coordinates cellular ingress, granulation tissue formation, and re-epithelialization. Commercially available matrices utilize decellularized human or bovine dermal matrices, synthetic biodegradable polymers (such as polycaprolactone), and naturally derived marine biomaterials, including acellular fish skin graphics rich in omega-3 fatty acids. These matrices are designed to modulate the localized inflammatory response, suppress bacterial colonization, and recruit host fibroblasts and keratinocytes to restore functional, vascularized skin tissue while minimizing scar formation.

==== In dentistry ====
A diagram of a human tooth. Stem cells are located in the pulp in the center.

Regenerative medicine has been studied by dentists to find ways that damaged teeth can be repaired and restored to obtain natural structure and function. Dental tissues are often damaged due to tooth decay, and are often deemed to be irreplaceable except by synthetic or metal dental fillings or crowns, which requires further damage to be done to the teeth by drilling into them to prevent the loss of an entire tooth.

Researchers from King's College London have created a drug called Tideglusib that claims to have the ability to regrow dentin, the second layer of the tooth beneath the enamel which encases and protects the pulp (often referred to as the nerve).

Animal studies conducted on mice in Japan in 2007 show great possibilities in regenerating an entire tooth. Some mice had a tooth extracted and the cells from bioengineered tooth germs were implanted into them and allowed to grow. The result were perfectly functioning and healthy teeth, complete with all three layers, as well as roots. These teeth also had the necessary ligaments to stay rooted in its socket and allow for natural shifting. They contrast with traditional dental implants, which are restricted to one spot as they are drilled into the jawbone.

A person's baby teeth are known to contain stem cells that can be used for regeneration of the dental pulp after a root canal treatment or injury. These cells can also be used to repair damage from periodontitis, an advanced form of gum disease that causes bone loss and severe gum recession. Research is still being done to see if these stem cells are viable enough to grow into completely new teeth. Some parents even opt to keep their children's baby teeth in special storage with the thought that, when older, the children could use the stem cells within them to treat a condition. Clinical studies conducted have reported usage of patients own dental pulp stem cells, aiding faster healing of orthodontic bone defects when transplanted using polymer scaffold carriers.

=== Extracellular matrix ===
Extracellular matrix materials are commercially available and are used in reconstructive surgery, treatment of chronic wounds, and some orthopedic surgeries; as of January 2017 clinical studies were under way to use them in heart surgery to try to repair damaged heart tissue.

The use of fish skin with its natural constituent of omega 3, has been developed by an Icelandic company Kereceis. Omega 3 is a natural anti-inflammatory, and the fish skin material acts as a scaffold for cell regeneration. In 2016 their product Omega3 Wound was approved by the FDA for the treatment of chronic wounds and burns. In 2021 the FDA gave approval for Omega3 Surgibind to be used in surgical applications including plastic surgery.

=== Cord blood ===
Though uses of cord blood beyond blood and immunological disorders is speculative, some research has been done in other areas. Any such potential beyond blood and immunological uses is limited by the fact that cord cells are hematopoietic stem cells (which can differentiate only into blood cells), and not pluripotent stem cells (such as embryonic stem cells, which can differentiate into any type of tissue). Cord blood has been studied as a treatment for diabetes. However, apart from blood disorders, the use of cord blood for other diseases is not a routine clinical modality and remains a major challenge for the stem cell community.

Along with cord blood, Wharton's jelly and the cord lining have been explored as sources for mesenchymal stem cells (MSC), and as of 2015 had been studied in vitro, in animal models, and in early stage clinical trials for cardiovascular diseases, as well as neurological deficits, liver diseases, immune system diseases, diabetes, lung injury, kidney injury, and leukemia.

=== Bioelectricity ===
The potential use of developmental bioelectricity in regenerative medicine is under active investigation, with particular interest in future organ and limb regeneration guided by bioelectric stimulation. Developmental bioelectricity refers to endogenous ion flows and voltage gradients across cell membranes (V_{mem}) in excitable (able to create an action potential) and non-excitable tissues that provide instructive cues for growth. These bioelectric states, set by ion channels and pumps, are propagated through gap-junction coupling and together with chemical gradients and physical forces they form long-range patterning circuits. Through voltage-sensitive signalling pathways, changes in V_{mem} modulate gene expression and cell behaviours (proliferation, migration, differentiation), thereby shaping tissue growth and polarity.

Experiments in vertebrate and invertebrate models indicate that bioelectric cues can steer regeneration. In Xenopus tadpoles, activating a proton pump (V-ATPase) that moves hydrogen ions out of cells is necessary for tail regrowth and can restore regeneration during a normally refractory stage; in adult Zebrafish, inhibiting the same pump impairs fin regrowth. In Planarians, brief electrical perturbations can cause tail pieces to form heads (including two-headed animals) or to regenerate heads resembling other species. In adult frogs, a 24-hour treatment with a drug-delivering ‘BioDome’ device initiated long-term hindlimb regrowth with multi-tissue repair and functional recovery.

Proposed techniques combine pharmacological control of ion channels and gap junctions, optogenetic actuators to write V_{mem} patterns with light, and devices that condition the injury microenvironment or apply controlled direct-current fields. Proposed tools include voltage-sensitive dyes, microelectrodes, and wearable or implantable stimulators. Some researchers and commentators note that, despite encouraging animal studies, evidence for large-scale appendage or organ regrowth in mammals remains limited, and achieving it will require standardized outcome measures, reproducible protocols across models, and safe, precise methods to control tissue electrical states in the body.

== See also ==
- Artificial organ
- Biomedicine
- Cloning
- Induced pluripotent stem cell
- Life extension
- LIN28
- Neuroregeneration
- Orthobiologics
- Osteoarthritis#Research
- Polyphyodont
- Regeneration (biology)
- Regeneration in humans
- Regenerative biology
- Regenerative endodontics
- Rejuvenation (aging)
- RepliCel, Canadian regenerative medicine company
- SPIONs
- Stem cell treatments
- TERMIS
- Tooth regeneration
