= Platelet swirling =

- Purpose: testing the quality of platelet-rich plasma

Platelet swirling is a noninvasive method for testing the quality of platelet-rich plasma (PRP). Platelet swirling is caused by light diffraction due to the alignment of normal disc-shaped platelets. These discs align light that is diffracted, creating a cloud- or swirl-like appearance.

Results of a platelet swirling test are recorded as positive or extensive swirl, moderate or intermediate swirl, and absent or negative swirl.
