= RepliCel =

RepliCel Life Sciences Inc.
- Founder: Rolf Hoffmann; Kevin McElwee
- Headquarters: Vancouver, British Columbia, Canada
- Key people: David Hall (CEO)
- Number of employees: 15 FTE (2015)
- Website: www.replicel.com

RepliCel Life Sciences is a Canadian regenerative medicine company based in Vancouver, British Columbia. The company focuses on development of cell therapies using a patient's own cells (autologous cell therapy). The company has treatment development activities targeting chronic tendon injuries which have failed to heal properly, and hair restoration. The company's expertise lies in isolation and exploitation of different cell populations found in the human hair follicle.

The company's business model is focused on establishing proof-of-concept for treatments leading to acquisition by a larger company. An alternative business model has been reported which does not involve acquisition but rather partnership where technologies and methods are licensed to a partner which will commercialize them.
