= Regenerative biology =

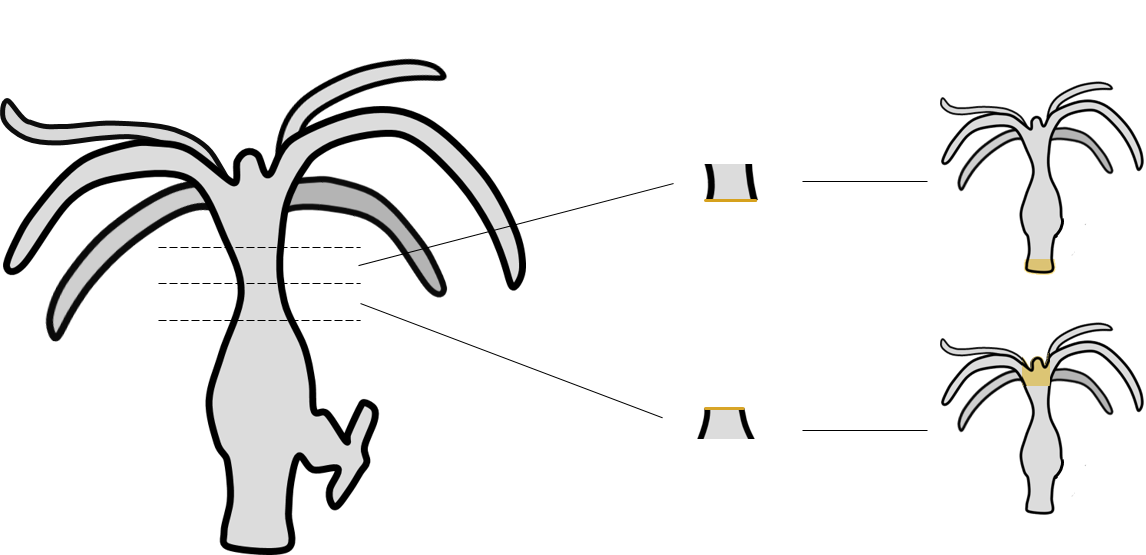
Regeneration in Hydra.

Regenerative biology is a branch of biology that studies the cellular and molecular mechanisms by which organisms replace or reconstitute cells, tissues, or body parts lost due to injury or cell death. This article focuses on the biological aspects: cellular principles, signaling pathways, animal models, and evolutionary hypotheses explaining the differences between highly regenerative organisms and those with limited regenerative capacity.

== Definition and general principles ==
Regeneration can involve different strategies:

1. Blastema-mediated regeneration (Epimorphosis): The formation of a proliferative mass of progenitor cells (a blastema) that reconstructs the amputated organ or limb.
2. Compensatory regeneration: The proliferation of differentiated cells to restore functional mass and tissue size without the formation of a blastema (e.g., mammalian liver).
3. Morphallaxis: The direct reorganization of existing tissues to repattern the organism, with little to no cellular proliferation.

Key processes include wound response activation, cell fate reprogramming or transition, communication between the stem cell niche and the extracellular matrix (ECM), and positional control.

== Cellular mechanisms ==
- Stem cells and progenitors: In models such as planarians, pluripotent populations (called neoblasts) produce all cell types necessary for regeneration. In regenerative vertebrates (e.g., salamanders), many tissues contribute to the blastema via partial dedifferentiation or the recruitment of local lineage-restricted progenitors.
- Positional signaling: Genes encoding positional information (e.g., anterior-posterior axis genes) are expressed in indicator tissues (such as muscle in planarians) and guide progenitors on which structures to reconstruct.
- Organizers and signaling centers: The formation of a center that secretes molecular signals (such as Wnt, FGF, BMP, Hedgehog) coordinates the polarity and patterning of the blastema.

== Recurrent molecular pathways ==
Comparative studies show the reuse of embryonic development pathways during regeneration:

- Wnt/β-catenin: Frequently associated with posterior pole specification and body axis formation across many models (planarians, cnidarians, vertebrates).
- FGF/ERK: Related to cell proliferation and blastema formation in appendages (limbs) and organs.
- BMP/TGF-β: Plays a fundamental role in dorsoventral patterning and the modulation of bone and tissue morphogenesis.
- Notch, Hedgehog, Hippo (Yap/Taz): Modulate proliferation, cell fate, and the architecture of the regenerating tissue.

Interactions between these pathways and the context (species, developmental stage, wound microenvironment) determine the success or limitation of the regenerative process.

== Animal models ==
- Hydra (Cnidaria): Capable of whole-body regeneration from fragments; central role of the Wnt pathway and "head" and "foot" organizers in re-establishing the oral–aboral axis. An important model for studying self-assembly and axial signaling in basal animals.
- Planarians (Platyhelminthes): High regenerative capacity mediated by pluripotent neoblasts and a "positional map" based on the regional expression of constitutive genes (Positional Control Genes or PCGs). A key model for studying positional memory.
- Salamanders / Axolotl (Urodela): Limb regeneration via blastema formation; the primary vertebrate example of cellular reprogramming and maintenance of positional memory. Modern studies use single-cell RNA sequencing (scRNA-seq) to trace lineages.
- Zebrafish (Danio rerio): Fin and heart regeneration; useful for dissociating fibrotic scarring from functional regeneration (studies on signals that allow cardiomyocytes to re-enter the cell cycle).

== Modern techniques and experimental approaches ==
Recent approaches that have advanced the field include:

- Single-cell sequencing (scRNA-seq): To identify transient cell states during regeneration.
- In vivo lineage tracing: Using transgenic lines and molecular barcoding.
- Genetic manipulation: Using RNAi and CRISPR/Cas9 to test gene function.
- Comparative genomics: To identify conserved or divergent gene regulatory networks (GRNs) across species.

== Clinical applications of regenerative biology ==
Translational research seeks to apply regenerative principles to human therapies, including tissue engineering, biomaterials, and therapies based on extracellular factors (such as extracellular vesicles).

A notable example of translational research involves polylaminin (a polymeric form of the protein laminin), investigated in the context of neuroregeneration. Studies led by researchers such as biologist Tatiana Coelho de Sampaio (UFRJ) indicate that this biomaterial may modulate the neural lesion environment.

- Preclinical studies: In animal models, polylaminin has been shown to favor axonal growth and improve functional parameters following spinal cord injury.
- Clinical trials: A pilot study is registered in the Brazilian Clinical Trials Registry (ReBEC) for acute spinal cord injury, indicating efforts to evaluate safety in humans.

== Evolutionary perspective ==
Phylogenetic comparisons indicate that regenerative ability may be an ancestral trait in metazoans, having been lost or modified throughout evolution. Changes in the regulation of pathways like Wnt/β-catenin and trade-offs with the immune system or reproduction may explain interspecific variations. The loss of regeneration in mammals is often attributed to regulatory differences (e.g., enhancer silencing) rather than the absence of regenerative genes.

== See also ==
- Regeneration (biology)
- Stem cell
- Developmental biology
- Regenerative medicine
