= Gustav Anders Hemwall =

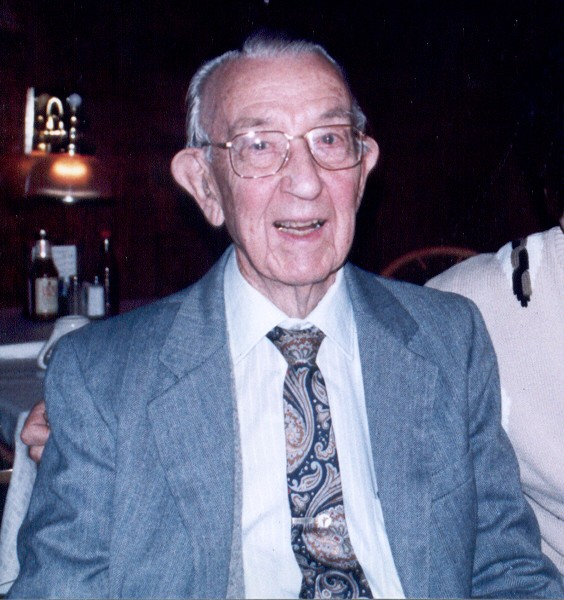
- Hemwall circa 1990–1995
- Born: October 24, 1908; Chicago, Illinois, US
- Died: November 22, 1998 (aged 90); Madison, Wisconsin, US
- Occupation: Physician
- Known for: Prolotherapy
- Spouse: Helen M. Moore (m. 1933–1998)
- Children: 4

Gustav Anders Hemwall (October 24, 1908 – November 22, 1998) was a physician at West Suburban Hospital in Oak Park, Illinois, and pioneer in prolotherapy.

== Biography ==
He was born on October 24, 1908, in Chicago, Illinois, to the Swedish immigrants Anders Hemwall I (1877–1956) and Sigrid S. Lawson (1877–1957). His father was a tailor. His siblings include Anders Hemwall II (1904), who died as an infant; Ruth Elizabeth Hemwall (1905–1993), who married Charles Peter Tiedje I (1912–1980); and Helen Edith Hemwall (1913–1997), who never married. Gustav married Helen M. Moore in 1933.

In 1955, at an American Medical Association meeting he learned of a new treatment for chronic lower back pain by George S. Hackett called prolotherapy. Hemwall went to Hackett's office in Canton, Ohio, and was trained in the technique.

Hemwall founded the Hackett Foundation in 1969 to promote prolotherapy and train physicians in the procedure.

He died in 1998 of a stroke at St. Mary's Hospital in Madison, Wisconsin, where he had been attending a medical conference. He was buried in Woodlawn Cemetery in the Chicago area.

== Publications ==
- Neuropathic Pain: A New Theory for Chronic Pain of Intrinsic Origin, Annals RCPSC, 1989
