= Hemotherapy =

Treatment of disease using blood or blood products

Hemotherapy (/hiːməˈθɛrəpi/ HEE-mə-THERR-ə-pee) or hemotherapeutics (/hiːməθɛrəˈpjuːtɪks/ HEE-mə-THERR-ə-PEW-tiks) is the treatment of disease by the use of blood or blood products from blood donation (by others or for oneself).

It includes various types, such as:

- Blood transfusion
- Packed red blood cells transfusion
- Fresh frozen plasma transfusion
- Plasmapheresis of various kinds, including plasma exchange
- Autohemotherapy, with autologous blood that is usually modified in some way
