= Discolysis =

Treatment for a herniated disc

Discolysis, also called chemonucleolysis or nucleolysis, is a treatment for a herniated disc that seeks to alleviate associated neurological symptoms through enzymatic or chemical destruction or softening of the nucleus pulposis. The procedure was first reported by Lyman W. Smith in 1964, and used chymopapain. Discolysis using chymopapain is no longer practiced because of the risk of anaphylaxis and of transverse myelitis.

Discolysis has also been used to describe a form of ozone therapy where an oxygen-ozone solution is injected into the intervertebral disc. This method is not well-accepted in part due to a lack of standardization of technique, training and equipment. In the United States, the procedure lacks FDA approval. The authors of a 2018 systematic review noted that only a small number of poor-quality studies on the effects of ozone discolysis in the low back were available, and while they reported efficacy, potentially serious complications were underreported. The authors concluded that ozone discolysis required more study with "adequate and consistent methodologies".
