= Ozone therapy =

Unproven alternative medicine

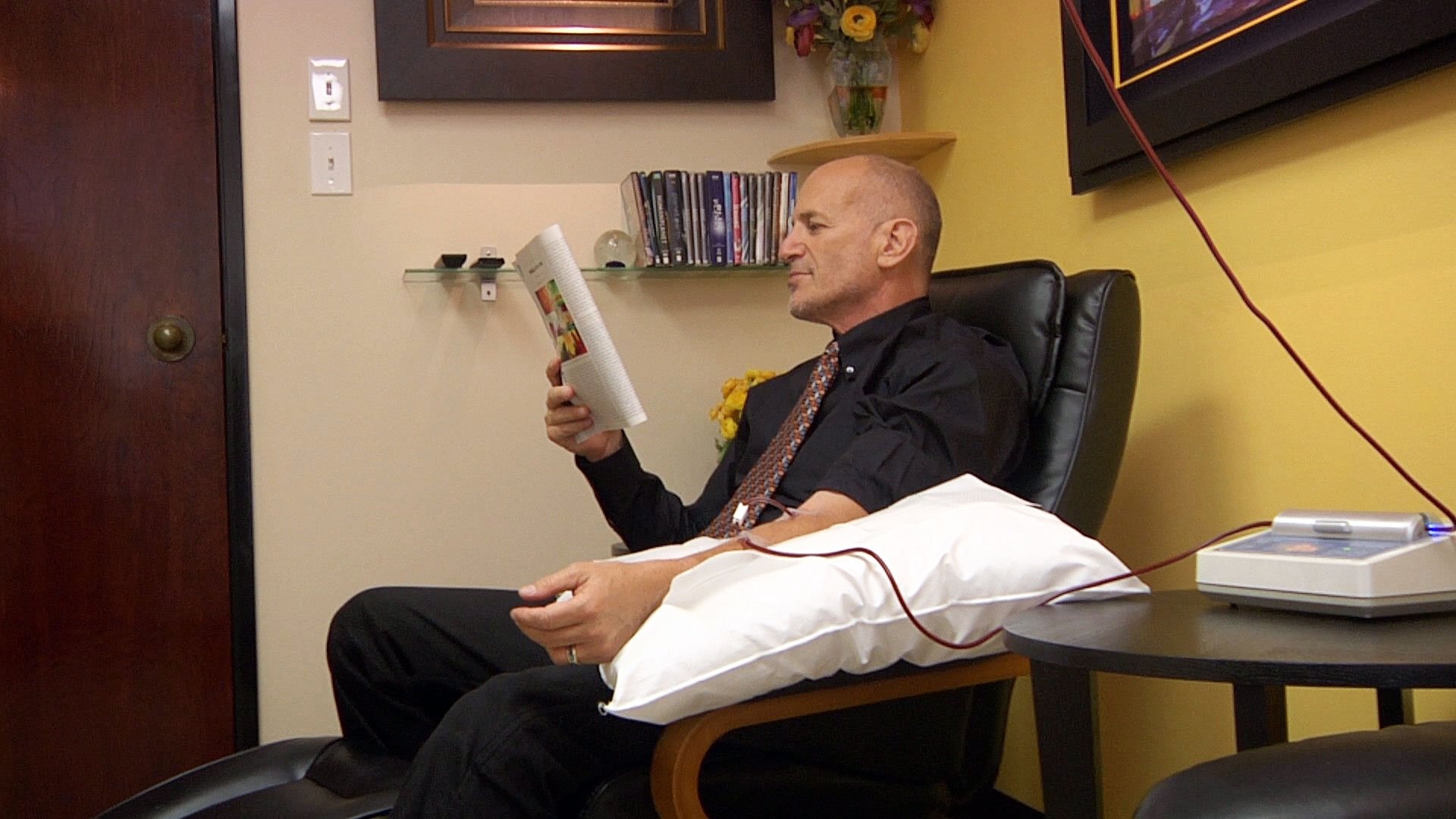
A man undergoes autohemotherapy, where blood is drawn, exposed to ozone, and reinjected

Ozone therapy is an alternative medical treatment that introduces ozone or ozonides to the body. The United States Food and Drug Administration (FDA) prohibits all medical uses of ozone "in any medical condition for which there is no proof of safety and effectiveness", stating "ozone is a toxic gas with no known useful medical application in specific, adjunctive, or preventive therapy. For ozone to be germicidal, it must be present in a concentration far greater than that which can be safely tolerated by man and animals."

Ozone therapy has been sold as an unproven treatment for various illnesses, including cancer, a practice which has been characterized as "pure quackery". The therapy can cause serious adverse effects, including death.

== Proposed uses ==
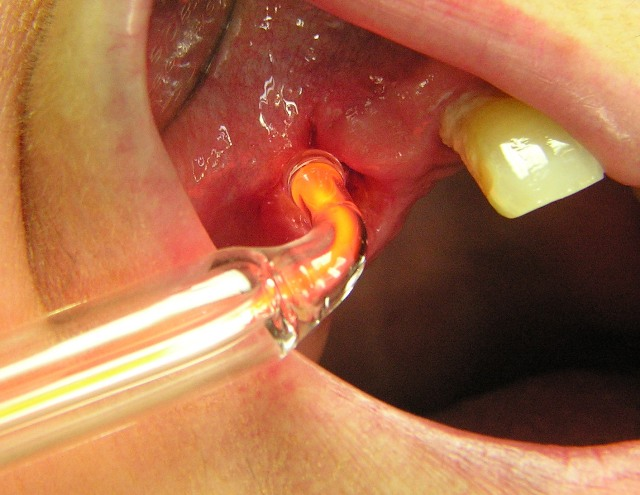
Ozone therapy as a dental procedure

Ozone therapy consists of the introduction of ozone into the body via various methods, usually involving its mixture with various gases and liquids before injection, with potential routes including the vagina, rectum, into a muscle, under the skin, or directly into a vein. Ozone can also be introduced via autohemotherapy, in which blood is drawn from the patient, exposed to ozone, and re-injected into the patient.

This therapy has been proposed as a primary or adjunct therapy for various diseases, including osteoarthritis, herniated disk, chronic wounds, hepatitis B and C, herpes zoster, human papillomavirus infection, HIV-AIDS, multiple sclerosis, cancer, heart disease, Alzheimer's dementia, and Lyme disease, though supportive evidence for some of these applications is limited. The American Cancer Society warned in 2010 that evidence for the efficacy of ozone therapy against cancer is inconclusive, and the therapy may be dangerous. For treatment of HIV/AIDS, although ozone deactivates the viral particles in vitro, well-designed studies have shown there is no benefit for living patients.

The United States Food and Drug Administration initially stated in 1976, and reiterated its position in 2006, that when inhaled, ozone is a toxic gas that has no demonstrated safe medical application, though their position statements primarily deal with its potential for causing inflammation and pulmonary edema in the lungs. They also emphasize that for ozone to be effective as a germicide, it must be present at concentrations far greater than can be safely tolerated by humans or other animals. More recent reviews have highlighted that different routes of administration may result in different therapeutic and side-effect profiles.

Some reviews have suggested ozone as a potential treatment for herniated discs and diabetic neuropathy. There is some controversy about its use by athletes to increase performance despite numerous adverse side effects within the pulmonary and/or skeletal muscle systems. Although its use is not disallowed in and of itself, it can be mixed with banned substances for administration prior to injection.

== Safety ==
Ozone therapy has potentially serious adverse effects, and as of 2012 at least five deaths had been reported due to the therapy's use on people with cancer. From 1975 to 1983 in Germany, research revealed six deaths, four cases of visual disturbance, three cases of paraplegias, four gas embolisms in the pulmonary circuit, two myocardial infarction, four pulmonary embolisms, two cases of apoplexy paralysis, and two cases of cardiac arrhythmia following ozone therapy. More commonly, pulmonary edema is the most prevalent adverse effect of ozone treatment. In the muscular system, many cases of tendon rupture, osteoarthritis, myositis, synovitis, joint infections, and muscle tears have been documented as results of ozone therapy. In the integumentary system, benign skin discoloration is most common. These all occurred following direct injection of O_{2}/O_{3} gas: a method now regarded as malpractice by most ozone practitioners. In each case, the clinical picture corresponded either to gas embolism, or allergic shock. The fact that one case of apparent allergic shock followed the injection of a minute quantity of gas raises the unknown possibility that other methods of administration might also carry the risk of allergic shock.

Much of the concern related to ozone therapy revolves around the safety of blood ozonation. When inhaled by mammals in high levels, ozone reacts with compounds in tissues lining the lungs and triggers a cascade of pathological effects, including pulmonary edema, however, ozone therapy does not usually involve inhalation of ozone gas. It has been argued that while peroxides (a product of ozone) are naturally generated inside phagocyte cells to kill bacteria, outside the cell they can damage tissue. Proponents suggest that its effects are tissue-dependent, though the subject is still debated.

Other serious incidents reported include transmission of hepatitis C. Ozone-based treatments can be associated with central nervous system toxicity, termed Ozone Induced Encephalopathy (OIE).

== Regulation and ethics ==
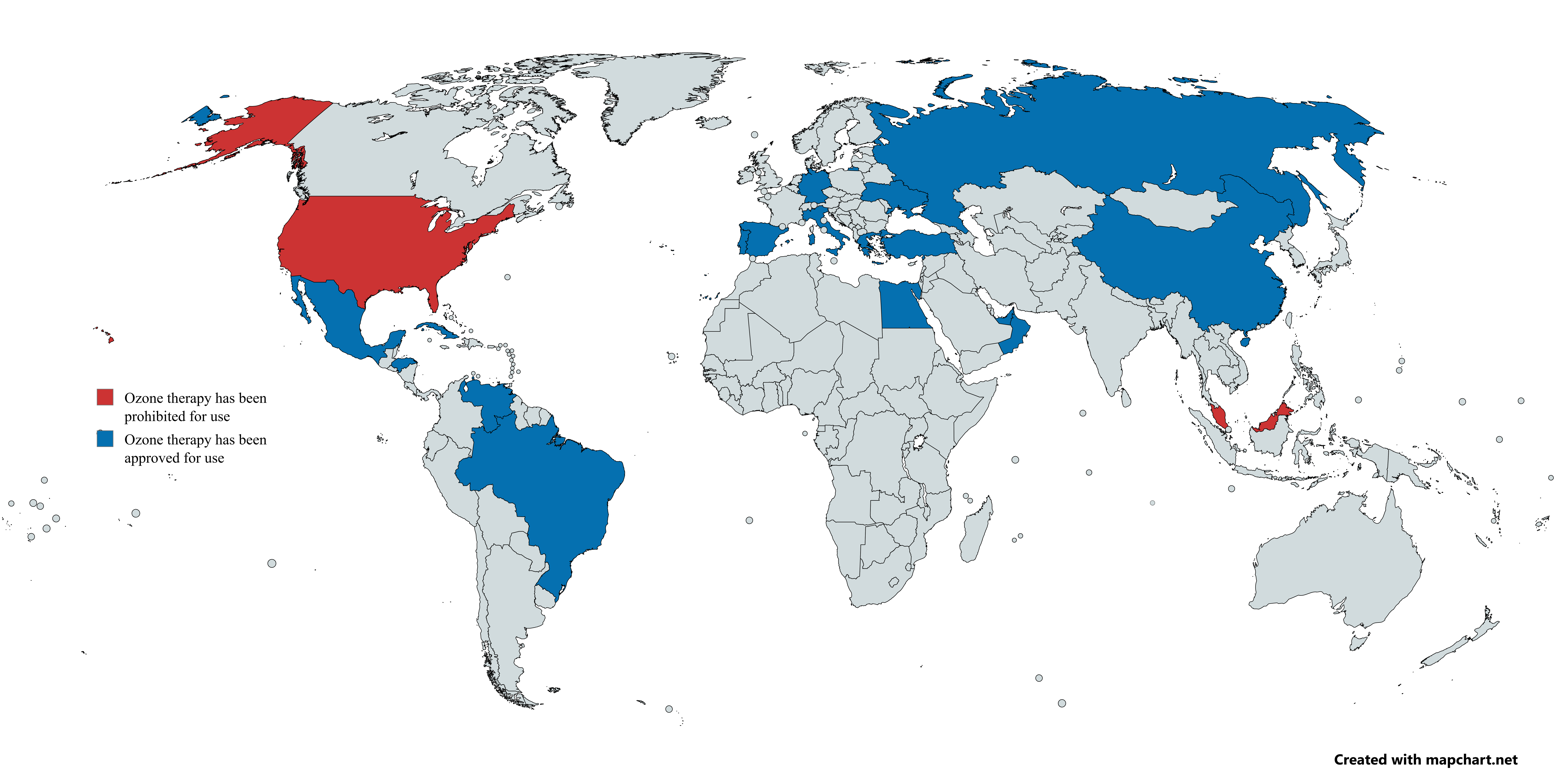
Countries regulating the use of ozone therapy

The FDA prohibits the medical use of ozone "in any medical condition for which there is no proof of safety and effectiveness", stating that "ozone is a toxic gas with no known useful medical application in specific, adjunctive, or preventive therapy. For ozone to be germicidal, it must be present in a concentration far greater than that which can be safely tolerated by man and animals."

Beginning in 1991 the FDA has prosecuted and sent to jail several people presenting themselves as medical doctors and selling ozone therapy products as a medical cure or operating medical clinics using ozone therapy for healing human illness. Arrests following similar activity have been made in other countries as well, including Uganda and Thailand.

Ozone therapy is sold as an expensive alternative cancer treatment in Germany. David Gorski has described the practice as "pure quackery". Proponents of the therapy falsely claim it is a recognized therapy there, but the German medical establishment has not approved ozone therapy.

In 2009, a panel of experts consulted by Forbes recommended that ozone therapy be included on a "list of the most egregious, dangerous, aggressively marketed health scams."

In Turkey, the Regulation on Traditional and Complementary Medicine Practices, published in the Official Gazette No. 29158 dated October 27, 2014, provided a legal basis for these practices; the Regulation also stipulates that "no claims may be made that such practices will eliminate a disease or provide a cure on their own."

Ozone therapy was banned in Malaysia in 2017. The Malaysian Health Ministry determined that the treatment could cause serious harm and had no scientific support as a treatment for any condition.

On 7 August 2023, the Brazilian government legalized ozone therapy as a complementary therapy, ignoring a request for veto due to lack of scientific evidence made in an open letter from the Brazilian National Academy of Medicine.

== History ==
In 1856, just 16 years after its discovery, ozone was first used in a healthcare setting to disinfect operating rooms and sterilize surgical instruments. By the end of the 19th century the use of ozone to disinfect drinking water of bacteria and viruses was well established in mainland Europe.

In 1892 The Lancet published an article describing the administration of ozone for treatment of tuberculosis. During World War I, ozone was tested at Queen Alexandra Military Hospital in London as a possible disinfectant for wounds. The gas was applied directly to wounds for as long as 15 minutes. This resulted in damage to both bacterial cells and human tissue. Other sanitizing techniques, such as irrigation with antiseptics, were preferable.

The psychoanalyst Wilhelm Reich was a proponent of ozone therapy, which was supposed to enhance an imaginary life force he called orgone. Reich developed a device utilizing ozonides in his work on bioenergetic analysis.

== See also ==
- Ozone health effects
- Air ioniser
- Gerson therapy - which can involve the use of ozone solutions for enemas
- List of unproven and disproven cancer treatments
