= Autologous conditioned serum =

Treatment method using patient's own blood serum

Autologous conditioned serum, also known as Orthokine and Regenokine, is an experimental procedure in which a person's own blood is extracted, manipulated, and then reintroduced with claimed benefit in osteoarthritis. There is limited evidence on safety and effectiveness as of 2017. It is not included in medical guidelines as of 2017. It is a type of autologous blood therapy.

== Medical use ==
There is limited evidence on safety and effectiveness as of 2017. There is tentative evidence in osteoarthritis. Its use has not been recommended or considered by the Osteoarthritis Research Society International.

== Process ==
The process removes about 2 US fluid ounces (59 ml) of blood from a patient's arm, which is then incubated at a slightly raised temperature. The liquid is then placed in a centrifuge until its constituent parts are separated. That serum is injected into the patient's affected area.

== History ==
Autologous conditioned serum is a patented method developed by molecular biologist Julio Reinecke and Peter Wehling, a spinal surgeon in Düsseldorf, Germany. Orthokine was first approved for use in Germany in 2003. Orthokine differs from a similar procedure with platelet-rich plasma (PRP), where platelets are targeted instead of the interleukin antagonist. Also, PRP does not require the blood to be heated as Orthokine does.

As of August 2012, about 60,000 patients worldwide have received the treatment. Americans have traveled to Germany for the treatment, which has not been approved by the U.S. Food and Drug Administration (FDA). Freddie Fu, a professor of orthopedic surgery at the University of Pittsburgh, said more high-quality independent trials proving the procedure's effectiveness are needed before the FDA approves. National Basketball Association player Kobe Bryant traveled to Germany to have the procedure performed. Some basketball fans refer to the procedure as the "Kobe Procedure".

The procedure costs €6,000 (about $7,400) as of July 2012 and is not covered by health insurance.
