= Platelet-poor plasma =

Blood plasma with a very low number of platelets

Platelet-Poor Plasma (PPP) is blood plasma with very low number of platelets (< 10 X 10^{3}/μL). Traditionally, PPP was recommended for use in platelet aggregation studies to both adjust the platelet-rich plasma concentration, and to serve as a control. PPP may have elevated levels of fibrinogen, which has the ability to form a fibrin-rich clot once activated. Wound healing requires cell migration and attachment, which is facilitated by this fibrin clot.

== Current uses ==
Fibrin sealants have found use in many clinical situations such as blood management, orthopaedic surgery, and cosmetic surgery.

== Preparation of platelet poor plasma ==
1. Within 1 hour of blood collection, centrifuge capped citrate (blue top) tube for 15 minutes
2. Using a plastic transfer pipet, remove the top 3/4 of plasma and place it in a plastic centrifuge tube with cap.
3. Centrifuge the plasma (in the plastic centrifuge tube) for another 15 minutes.
4. Using a plastic transfer pipet, remove the top 3/4 into a plastic tube. Do not disturb the plasma in the bottom of the spun tube, where any residual platelets will be.
5. Aliquots with visible red cells or hemolysis (pink plasma) are not acceptable.
6. Freeze plasma immediately. Samples for most laboratory assays should be frozen within 4 hours of collection.

== Future possibilities ==
As a byproduct of PRP preparation, PPP may also find use in tissue engineering applications as an autologous degradable scaffold. This plasma portion is frequently discarded when used with PRP treatments.
