= Collagen induction therapy =

Cosmetic procedure

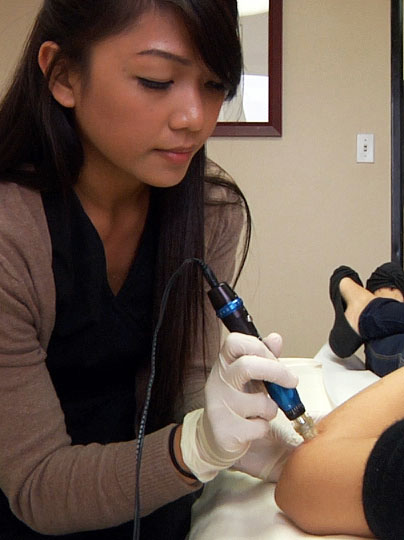
- Nurse performing collagen induction therapy for scar reduction using a microneedle stamping device

Collagen induction therapy (CIT), also known as microneedling, dermarolling, or skin needling, is a cosmetic procedure that involves repeatedly puncturing the skin with tiny, sterile needles (microneedling the skin). It is important to distinguish CIT from other contexts in which microneedling devices are used on the skin (e.g., transdermal drug delivery, vaccination).

It is a technique for which research is ongoing, but has been used for a number of skin problems including scarring and acne. Some studies have also shown that when combined with minoxidil treatment, microneedling is able to treat hair loss more effectively than minoxidil treatment alone.

== Combination with vampire facials ==
Platelet-rich plasma (PRP) can be combined with collagen induction therapy treatment in a form of dermatologic autologous blood therapy. PRP is derived from the patient's own blood and may contain growth factors that increase collagen production. It can be applied topically to the entire treatment area during and after collagen induction therapy treatments or injected intradermally to scars. Efficacy of the combined treatments remains in question pending scientific studies.

More serious safety concerns have been cited for these treatments, popularly known as vampire facials, when performed in non-medical settings by people untrained in infection control. The New Mexico Department of Health issued a statement that at least one such business offering vampire facials "could potentially spread blood-borne infections such as HIV, hepatitis B and hepatitis C to clients".

In April 2024, the CDC announced that three women who had been patients at the Albuquerque, New Mexico, VIP Spa had been diagnosed with HIV after getting "vampire facials" there. Another almost 200 former clients and their sexual partners were also tested but were found to not have HIV. No mention was made of any testing for other possible blood-borne infections.
