= Polylaminin =

Stabilized form of laminin

Polylaminin or polyLM, is a stabilized form of laminin, a family of natural proteins, which is being studied for use in treating spinal cord injuries in animals and humans. In early human trials, a patient with a fractured neck vertebra after a car accident had a full recovery after a year, and a chronic quadriplegic patient regained arm movement. The Brazilian Academy of Neurology, Brazilian Academy of Sciences, and the Brazilian Society for the Progress of Science advise caution before clinical tests are completed.
