= Platelet-rich fibrin matrix =

The "platelet-rich fibrin matrix" (PRFM) method is a cosmetic surgery procedure involving plasma needling. It is a way of extracting platelets from the patient's own blood and using them as a dermal filler – that is, as a substance injected under the skin of the face to try to fill out wrinkles.

PRFM is an outpatient procedures that, as of March 2011, costs about $900 to $1,500 in the U.S. and takes less than half an hour. Blood is drawn from the patient's arm and spun in a centrifuge to separate out the platelets, which are then injected back under the patient's facial skin. It can also be combined in a specific way with other fillers. A procedure using this combination has been marketed as the "Vampire facelift".

PRFM has been available on the U.S. market since 2009. It was developed and is marketed by the Aesthetic Factors corporation. A platelet extraction centrifuge was cleared by the U.S. Food and Drug Administration (FDA) in 2002. As of March 2011, platelets extracted in this centrifuge have not been cleared or approved by the FDA for facial rejuvenation. Nonetheless, Selphyl has been described as an "FDA approved dermal filler" in YouTube videos and trade publications.

The efficacy of PRFM is contested. As of March 2011, according to a New York Times report, it is attested by several plastic surgeons who use it but remains unproven by research. Phil Haeck, the president of the American Society of Plastic Surgeons, dismissed the procedure as "creepy", "a gimmick" and as "antiquated as bloodletting". It is marketed as Selphyl, TruPRP, Emcyte, Regen, and Pure Spin.
