= Platelet-rich plasma =

Blood product used in transfusion medicine

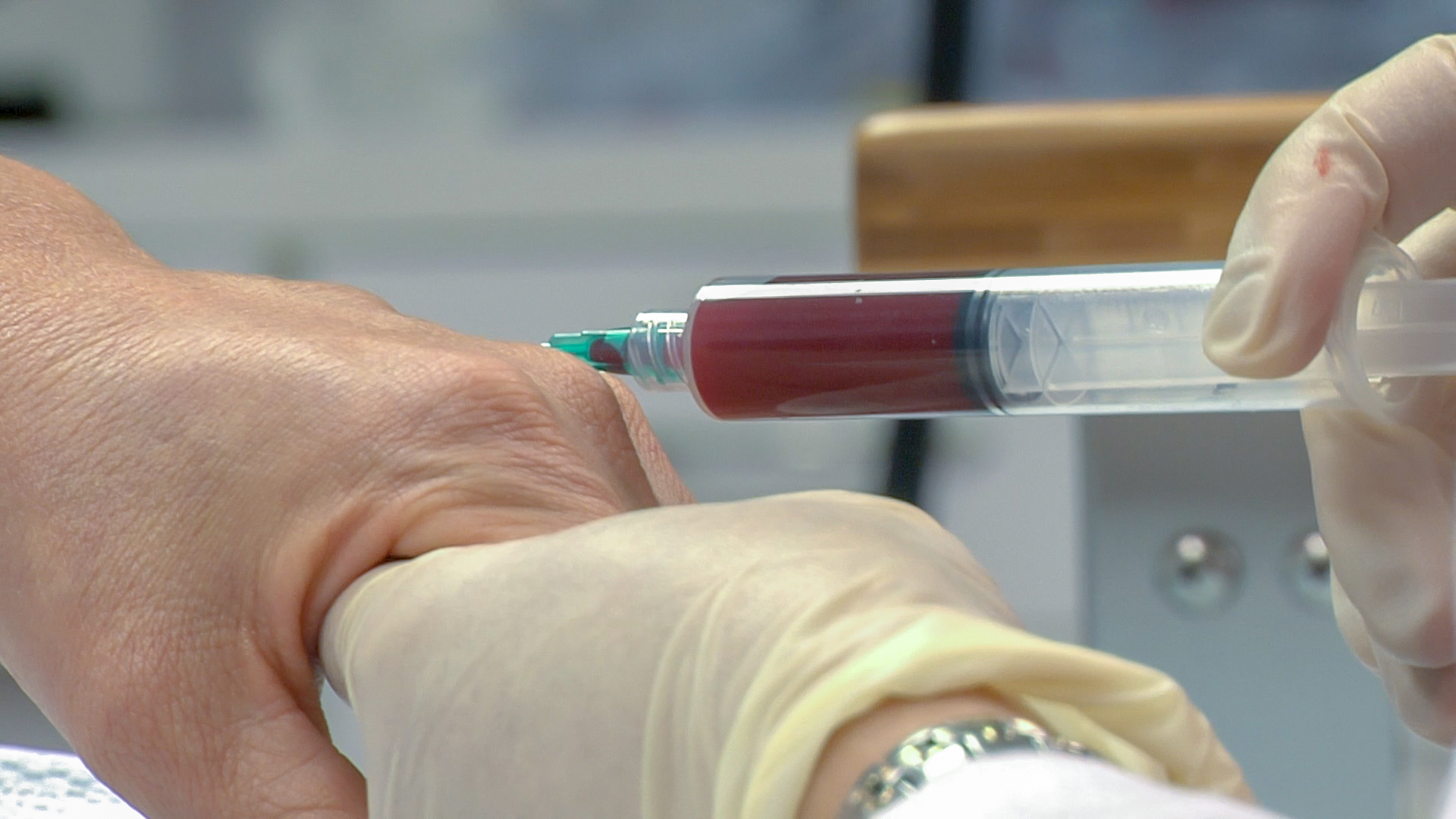
- Platelet-rich plasma injection into the hand
- MeSH: D053657

Platelet-rich plasma (PRP), also known as autologous conditioned plasma, is a concentrate of plasma protein derived from whole blood, centrifuged to remove red blood cells but retaining platelets. Though promoted for treating various medical conditions, evidence of its benefits was mixed as of 2020, showing effectiveness in certain conditions and ineffectiveness in others.

As a concentrated source of blood plasma and autologous conditioned plasma, PRP contains multiple growth factors and other cytokines that can stimulate the healing of soft tissues and joints. Indications for its use include sports medicine and orthopaedics (such as acute muscle strains, tendinopathy, tendinosis, muscle-fascial injuries, and osteoarthritis) dermatology (for androgenic alopecia, wound healing, and skin rejuvenation), and even proctology (for fistula en ano).

Various preparation protocols exist, with the underlying principle of concentrating platelets to 3–5 times physiological levels, then injecting this concentrate into the tissue where healing is desired. Beyond clinical practice, PRP has been utilized in various tissue engineering applications involving bone, cartilage, skin, and soft tissue repair. It serves as a source for the delivery of growth factors and/or cells within tissue-engineered constructs, often in combination with biomaterials.

== Medical use ==
Evidence for benefit of PRP is mixed, with some evidence for use in certain conditions and against use in other conditions. It has been investigated for chronic tendinitis, osteoarthritis, in oral surgery, and in plastic surgery.

=== Elbow tendinitis ===
There is no good evidence that PRP or autologous whole blood injections improves elbow tendon healing.

=== Rotator cuff disease ===
A 2022 review and meta-analysis showed improved patient-rated outcomes in patients with partial rotator cuff tears. At 8 weeks post injection, they found PRP to be effective. A 2021 prospective study examined the effectiveness of PRP for partial thickness rotator cuff tears. Patients were given 2 separate PRP injections and followed for 2 years. The study noted: "No adverse events were seen in any patient. Based on global rating scores positive results were seen in 77.9 % of patients at 6 months, 71.6 % at 1 year, and 68.8 % of patients at 2 years". They found PRP most effective in more damaged tendons. A 2021 meta-analysis found that PRP was effective for partial rotator cuff tears but the effects were no longer evident at 1 year.

PRP has been shown to be superior to cortisone injections in several studies. This is especially evident in the longer term.

A 2019 review found it not to be useful in rotator cuff disease. A 2018 review found that it may be useful. A 2009 review found few randomized controlled trials that adequately evaluated the safety and efficacy of PRP treatments and concluded that PRP was "a promising, but not proven, treatment option for joint, tendon, ligament, and muscle injuries".

=== Osteoarthritis ===
Tentative evidence supports the use of PRP in osteoarthritis of the knee. A 2019 meta-analysis found that PRP might be more effective in reducing pain and improving function than hyaluronic acid in knee arthritis. This therapeutic effect is not only considered to be dependent on the concentration of growth factors but also on the presence of plasma clotting factors which can help to regulate inflammation and joint tissue regeneration.

=== Meniscus injury ===
A 2022 review found that in people with meniscus tears, PRP treatment reduced the failure rate of meniscus repair surgery and reduced postoperative pain. However, the review did not find consistent evidence that PRP improved knee function.

=== Other musculoskeletal ===
A 2014 Cochrane review of musculoskeletal injuries found very weak evidence for a decrease in pain in the short term, and no difference in function in the short, medium or long term. It has not been shown to be useful for bone healing. A 2016 review of bone graft augmentation found only one study reporting a difference in bone augmentation, while four studies found no difference. As compared to other conservative treatments for non-surgical orthopedic illnesses (e.g. steroid injection for plantar fasciitis), evidence does not support the use of PRP as a conservative treatment. A 2018 review found that evidence was lacking for Achilles tendinopathy. A 2019 meta-analysis found that, for most outcomes in Achilles tendinopathy, PRP treatment did not differ from placebo treatment. A 2019 study conducted an umbrella review that "considered studies that included populations with differing levels of physical activity, including studies on the sporting population (professional and/or recreational athletes) and studies didn't explicitly mention involving a sporting population." This inquiry reported only poor quality evidence that PRP offers any clinical benefits for treatment in acute muscle, tendon, and ligament injuries in any population.

=== Hair loss ===
Studies have reported that PRP is beneficial for alopecia areata and androgenetic alopecia and can be used as an alternative to minoxidil or finasteride. A review reported it to improve hair density and thickness in both genders. A minimum of 3 treatments, once a month for 3 months are recommended, and afterwards a 3-6 month period of continual appointments for maintenance. Factors that determine efficacy include number of sessions, double versus single centrifugation, age, gender, and the injection site.

=== Assisted reproduction ===
PRP can be inoculated into the uterine cavity, to improve endometrial receptivity in cases of refractory endometrium. Studies have reported that intrauterine inoculation of PRP before embryo transfer can thicken the endometrium and improve reproductive prognosis. PRP has been studied for the management of Asherman's Syndrome.

PRP can be inoculated experimentally into the ovary to promote ovarian tissue regeneration. The main applications would be in cases of diminished ovarian reserve or premature ovarian failure.

A 2023 retrospective observational study reported PRP's effectiveness in rejuvenating ovarian fertility and viability in terms of "the influence of intraovarian injection of autologous PRP on the levels of E2". and pregnancy outcome in women treated with PRP who had a history of infertility, hormonal abnormalities, an absence of menstrual cycle, and premature ovarian failure in a single centre."

A 2024 review showed that PRP is beneficial when used as intraovarian injections for women with decreased fertility. PRP used for fertility trouble increases AFC, number of cleavage embryos, and improves cancellation rate in women with poor ovarian reserve. However, "Although there was an improvement of baseline hormones (anti-Müllerian hormone, follicle-stimulating hormone, and estradiol) after intraovarian injection of PRP, this improvement failed to reach statistical significance (except the improvement of serum AMH analyzed in quasi-experimental studies)."

=== Venous ulcers ===
Venous ulcers are persistent ankle or lower leg wounds that become open. A 2024 meta-analysis reported a positive effect on the size of ulcers as well as complete healing time for venous ulcers compared to standard treatments. A study combining a PRP therapy with conventional venous ulcer treatments reported improved quality of life and healing time. "In terms of safety, the recurrence rate in the PRP group was significantly lower than that in the control group, while the rates of infection and irritative dermatitis showed no significant difference from the control group."

=== Diabetic foot ulcers ===
A 2024 meta-analysis reported that the growth factors present in PRP are vital in the healing of diabetic foot ulcers; specifically in their closure. The treatments were reported to significantly increase the healing rate in comparison to conventional treatments.

=== Aesthetic medicine ===
Platelet-rich plasma therapy is a minimally invasive procedure that may be used in aesthetic medicine to treat skin conditions such as the removal of wrinkles, the reduction of lines, and improvement of blemishes, and hair loss. Concentrated PRP solution is injected into the treatment area to target damaged cells and tissues. The growth factors and proteins in PRP aid in rejuvenating the skin, and improving the condition of the scalp stimulating hair growth.

== Adverse effects ==
Adverse effects have been reported to be low in most trials. A review reported weak evidence of harm, occurring at comparable, low rates in treated and untreated people.

== Composition ==
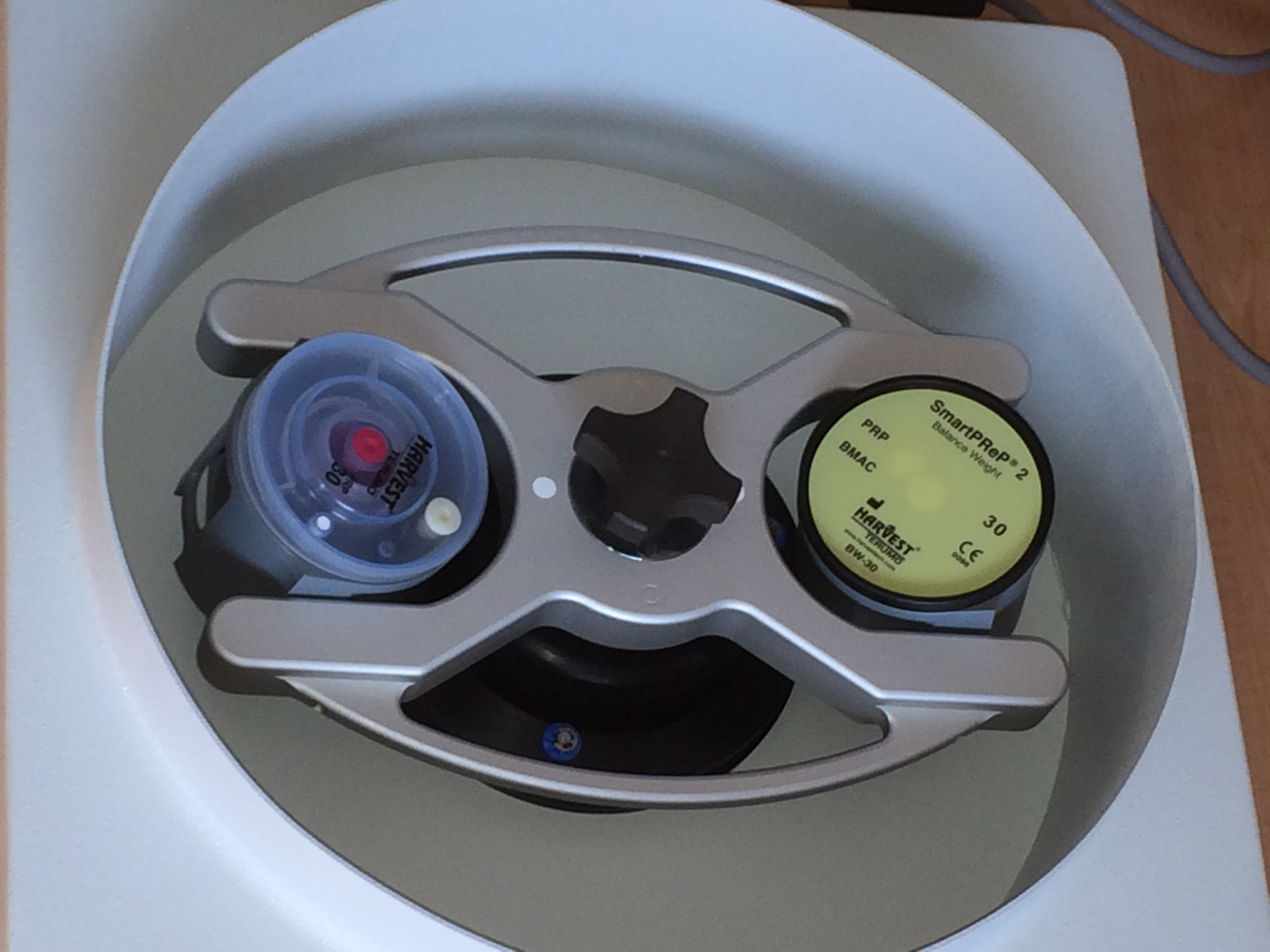
Whole blood placed in centrifuge prior to two-stage centrifugation

The three general categories of preparation of PRP based on leukocyte and fibrin content are leukocyte-rich PRP, leukocyte reduced PRP, and leukocyte platelet-rich fibrin.

The efficacy of certain growth factors in healing various injuries and the concentrations of these growth factors found within PRP are the theoretical basis for the use of PRP in tissue repair. Though not required for the process, platelets can be activated by the addition of thrombin or calcium chloride, which induce the release of the factors from alpha granules. The addition of thrombin or calcium chloride is not required as natural thrombin activates the cells upon injection. The growth factors and other cytokines present in PRP include:

- platelet-derived growth factor
- transforming growth factor beta
- fibroblast growth factor
- insulin-like growth factor 1
- insulin-like growth factor 2
- vascular endothelial growth factor A
- vascular endothelial growth factor C
- epidermal growth factor
- interleukin 8
- keratinocyte growth factor
- connective tissue growth factor
- hepatocyte growth factor
- stromal cell-derived factor 1
- endostatin

== Manufacturing ==
PRP is prepared by taking blood from the person, and then putting it through centrifugation designed to separate PRP from platelet-poor plasma and red blood cells. This is usually done in the clinic, using commercially available kits and equipment. The resulting substance varies from person to person and from facility to facility.

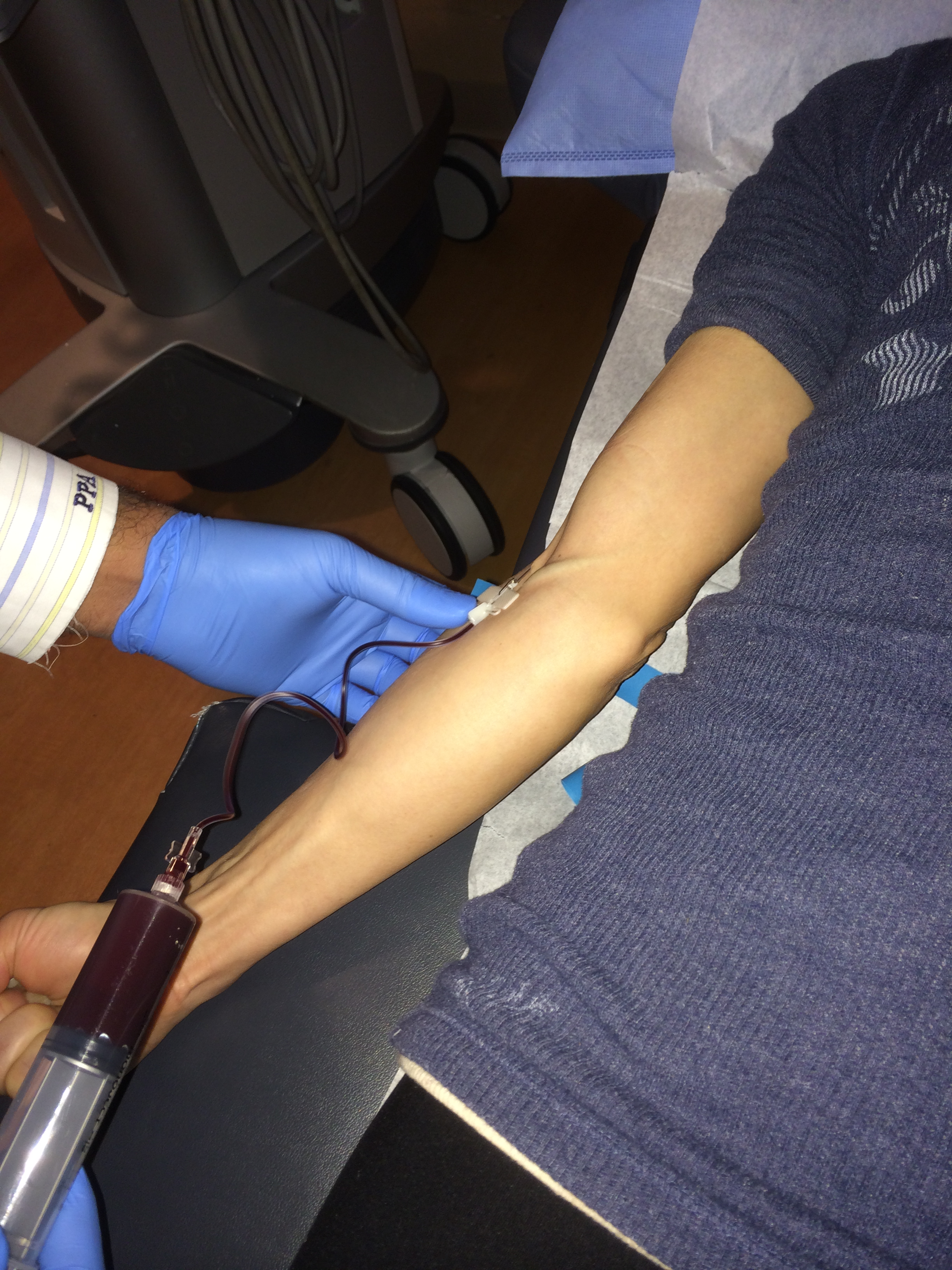
Blood drawn from patient

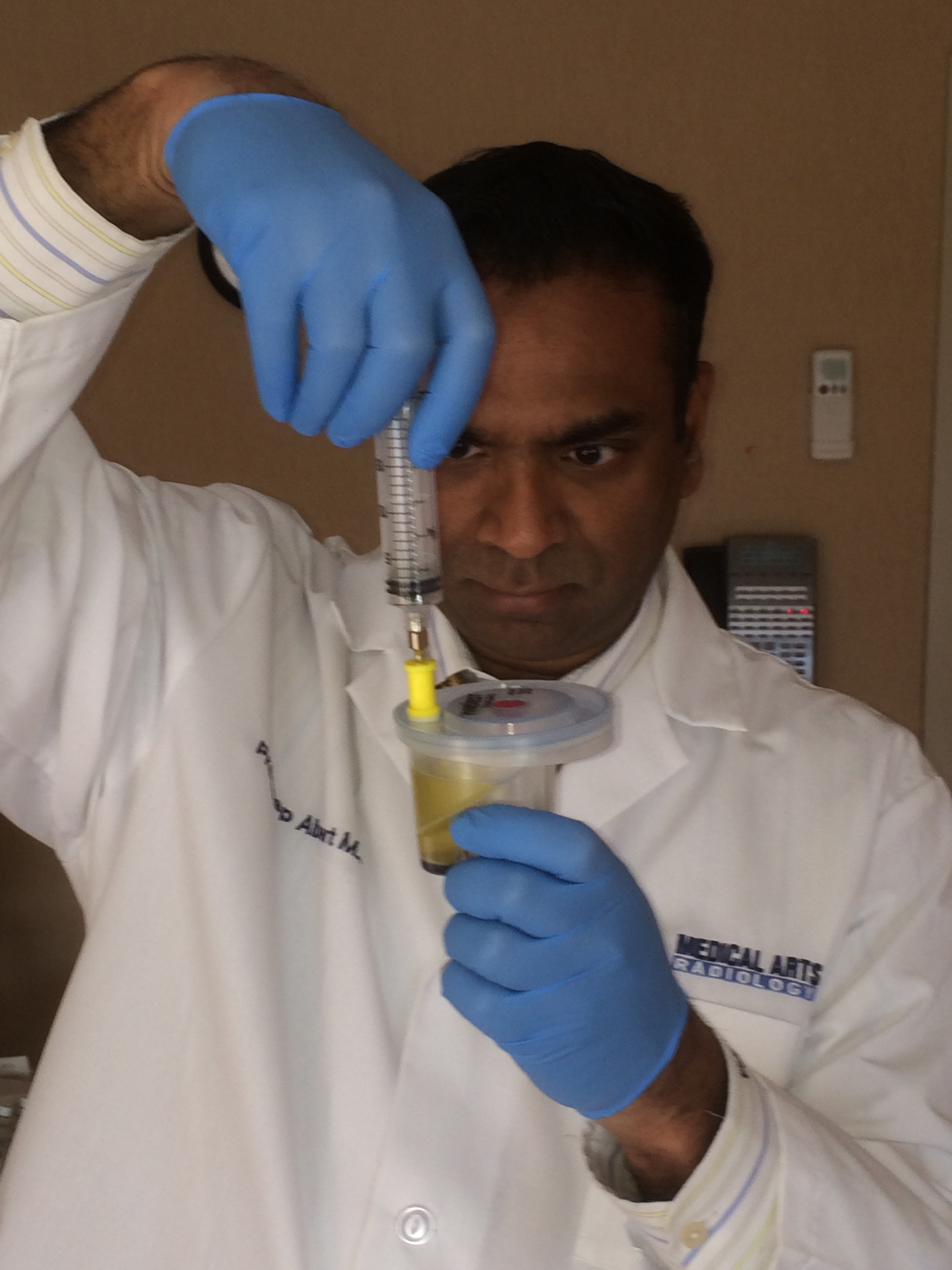
Removal of PRP after double centrifugation

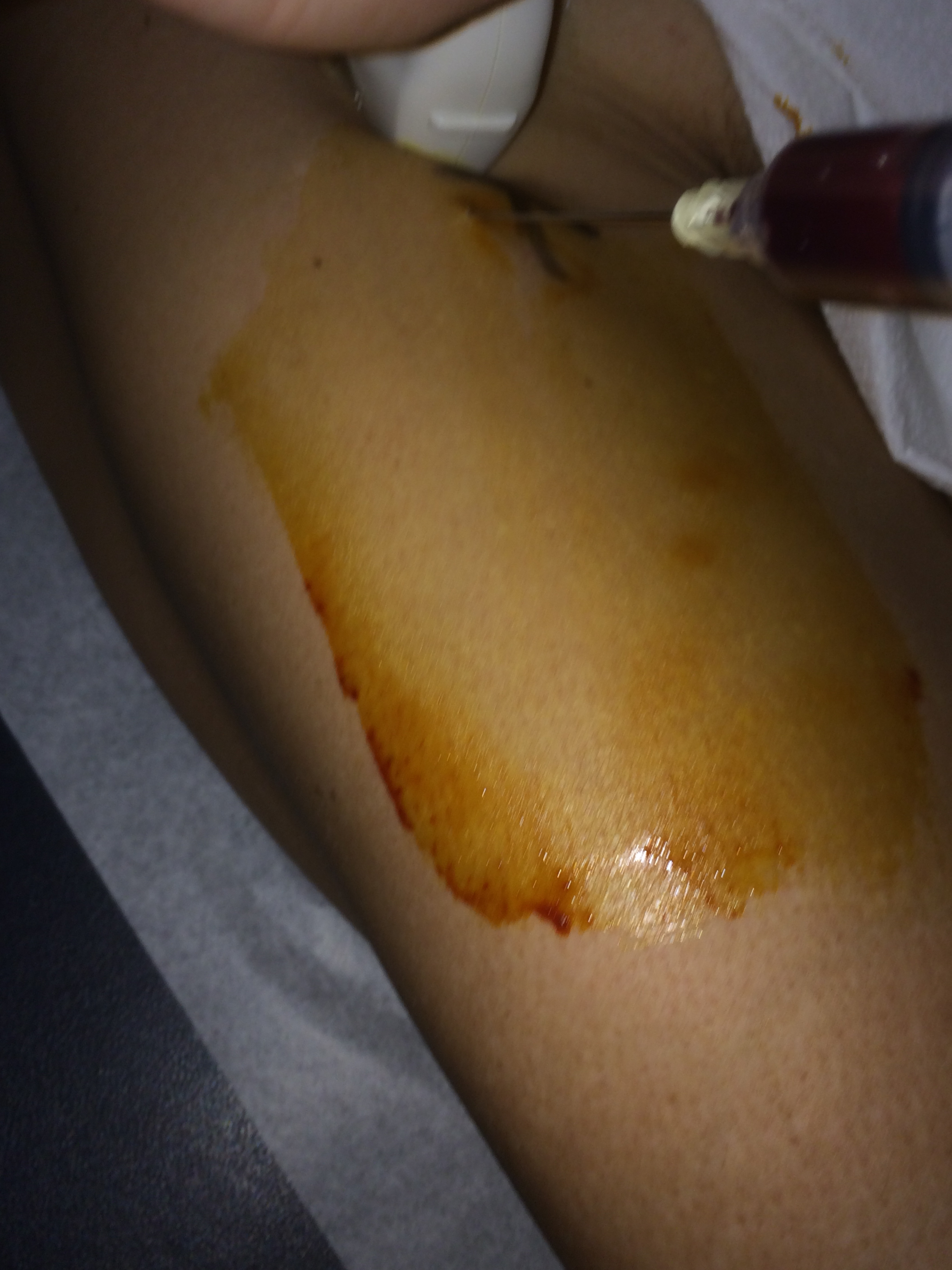
PRP is Injected into area of injury via ultrasound guidance

== Regulatory status ==
PRP is not regulated by the FDA because, like certain other human tissue and blood products, it is exempted from the traditional regulatory pathways; any use of PRP in a clinical setting is therefore considered "off label". The medical devices used to prepare PRP, however, are subject to FDA clearance.

== Society and culture ==
PRP has received attention in media as a result of its use by athletes.

In the 2010s, cosmetic procedures marketed under the name of "vampire facials" grew in popularity, fueled by celebrity endorsement. These facials generally center on PRP treatment, and usually involve microneedling.

In April 2024, the CDC announced that three women who had been patients at the Albuquerque, New Mexico, VIP Spa had been diagnosed with HIV after getting such facials; another almost 200 former clients and their sexual partners tested negative. Investigations by New Mexico and federal health officials revealed that the woman performing the procedures was operating out of an unlicensed medical spa, practicing without a medical license, and reusing blood-contaminated equipment intended for single-patient use without sterilization between patients.

PRP has been injected into the vagina, in a procedure called "O-shot" or "orgasm shot", with claims to improve orgasms. No evidence supports such claims.

=== Doping ===
PRP treatments may violate anti-doping rules. As of 2010, it was not clear whether PRP could have a systemic impact on circulating cytokine levels, affecting doping tests and whether PRP treatments had systemic anabolic effects or affect performance. In January 2011, the World Anti-Doping Agency removed intramuscular injections of PRP from its prohibitions after determining that there is a "lack of any current evidence concerning the use of these methods for purposes of performance enhancement".

== History ==
In the early 1940s clinicians used extracts of growth factors and cytokines for healing. The term 'platelet-rich plasma' was first used in 1954 by Kingsley and in the 1960s the first PRP blood banks were established, becoming popular by the 1970s. In the 1970s PRP was used in hematology, originally for transfusions to treat thrombocytopenia. Ten years later it was used for maxillofacial surgeries. PRP was first used in Italy in 1987 in an open heart surgery procedure. In 2006 PRP was starting to be considered of potential use for both androgenic alopecia and alopecia areata.

== See also ==
- Autologous blood injection
- Autologous conditioned serum
- Hypoxia preconditioned plasma
- Platelet-rich fibrin matrix
- Platelet swirling
